= Transmission tower =

Structure used to support an overhead power line

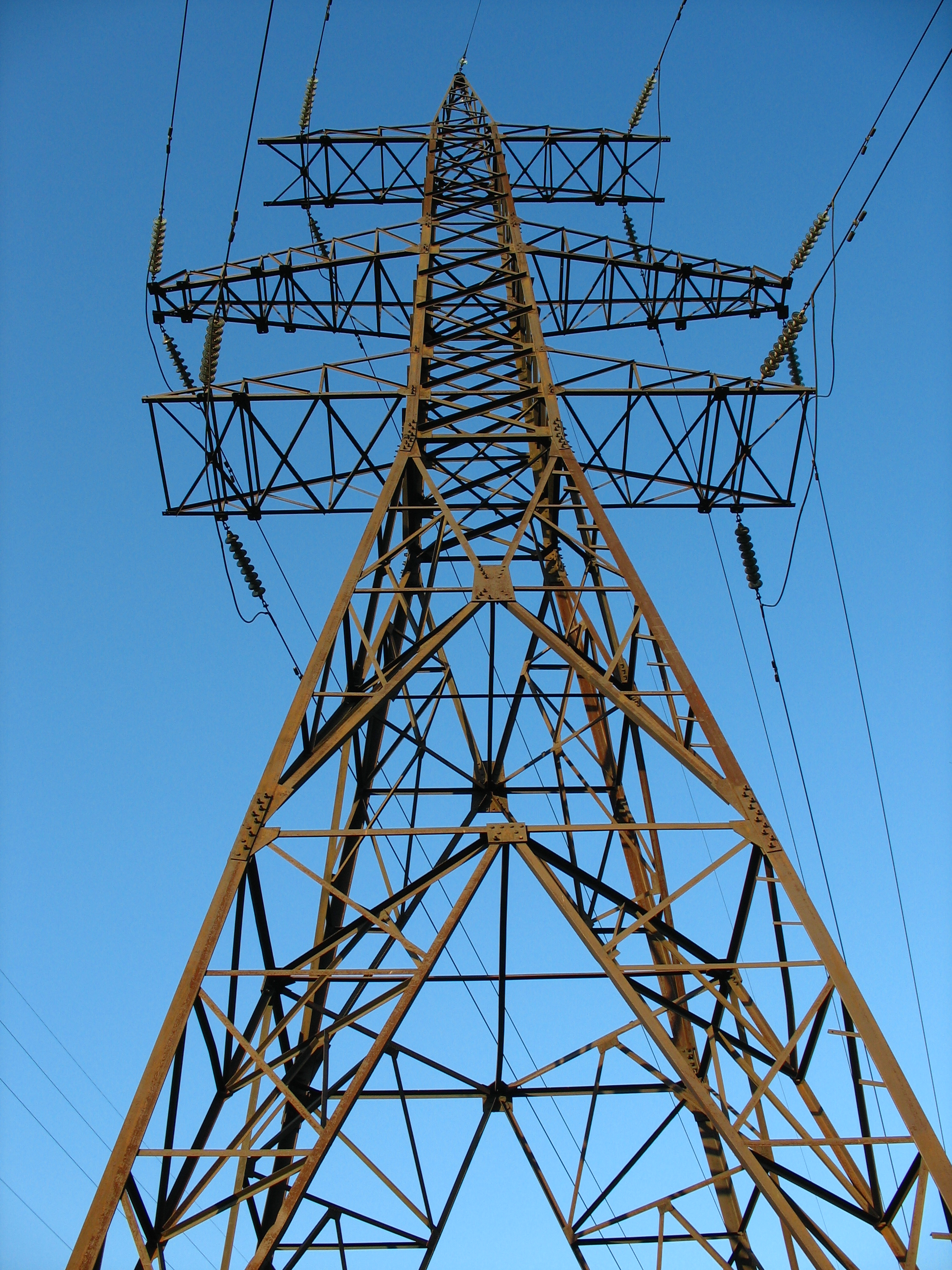
- Transmission tower in Dnipro, Ukraine
- Component type: Structure, lattice tower and overhead power line
- First produced: 20th century

A transmission tower (also known as an electricity pylon, hydro tower, or pylon) is a tall structure used to support an overhead power line. It is usually a lattice or tubular tower made of steel. In electrical grids, transmission towers carry high-voltage transmission lines that transport electric power from generating stations to electrical substations; while utility poles are used to support lower-voltage, electricity contactor relays, three-phase electric power distribution switches, sub-station, sub-transmission lines or distribution lines that transport electricity from substations to electricity installed capacity to end customers.

There are four categories of transmission towers: (i) the suspension tower, (ii) the dead-end tower, (iii) the termination tower, and (iv) the transposition tower. The heights of transmission towers typically range from 15 to 55 m (49 to 180 ft), although when longer spans are needed, such as for crossing water, taller towers are sometimes used.

== Terminology ==
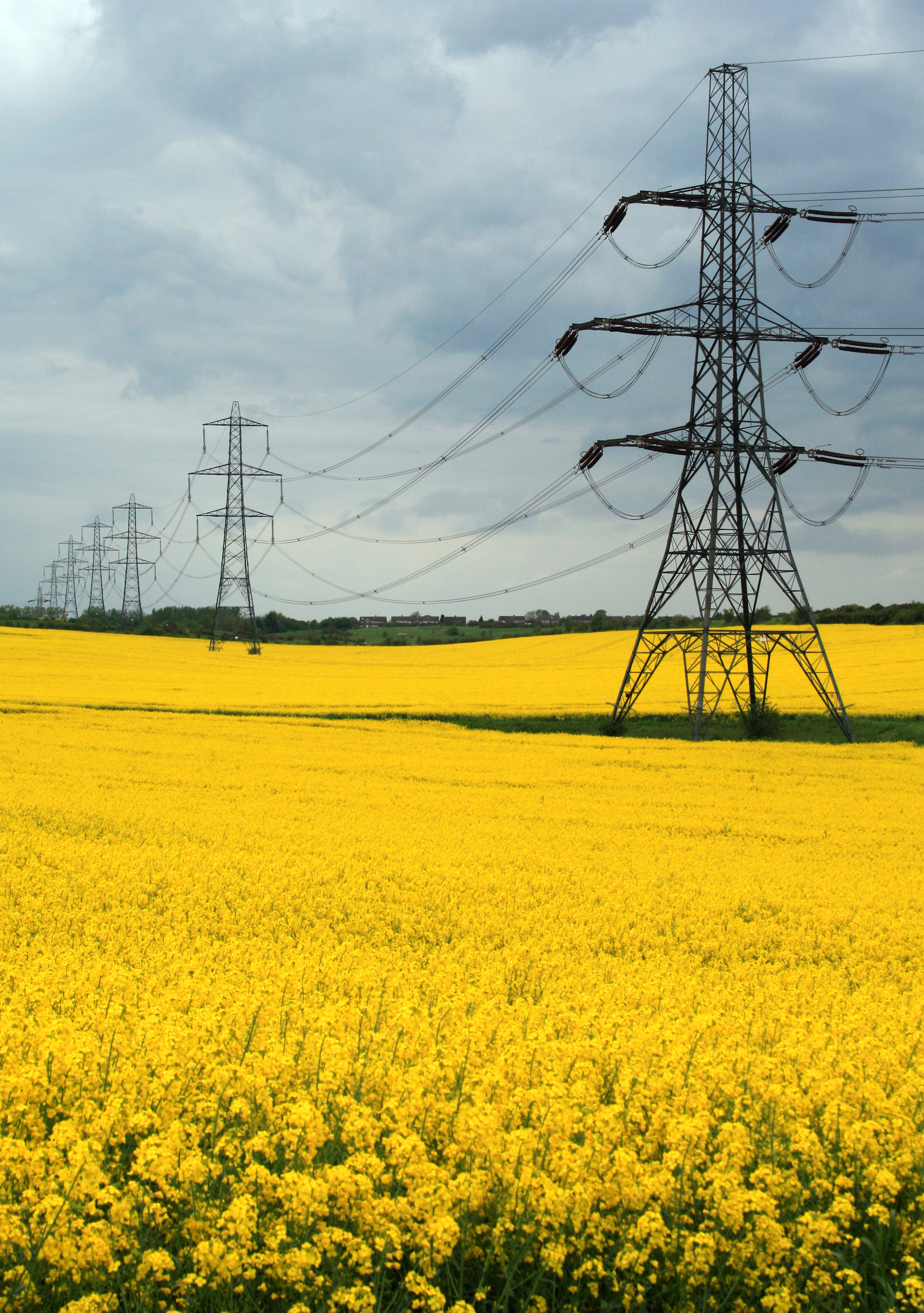
Pylon in Shorne, Kent, England

Transmission tower is the term for the structure used in the industry in the United States and some other English-speaking countries. In Europe and the U.K., the terms electricity pylon and pylon derive from the basic shape of the structure, an obelisk with a tapered top. In Canada, the term hydro tower is used, because hydroelectricity is the primary source of electricity for the country.

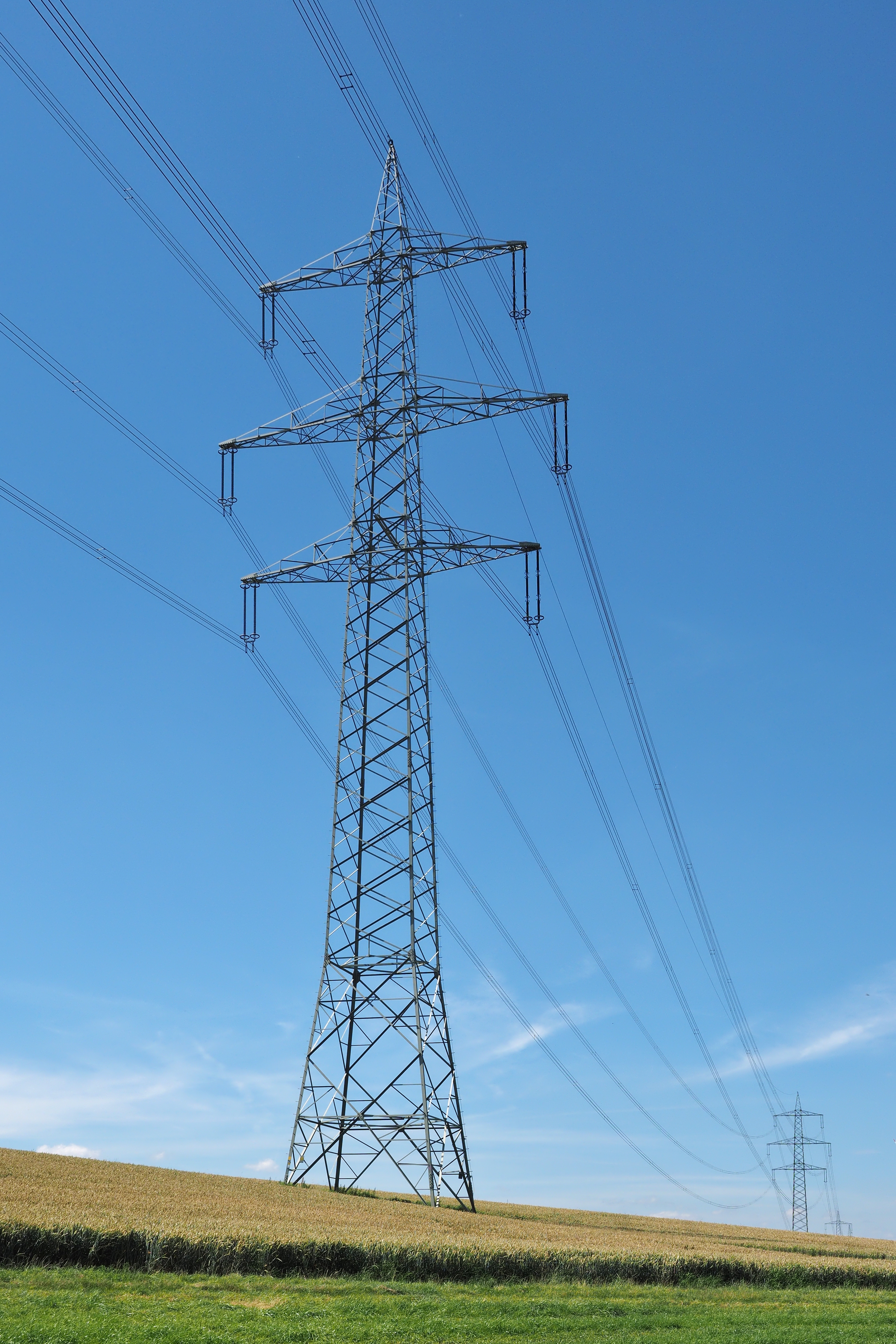
A Barrel pylon on the Hessen Ost line, shown in focus. More can be seen on the bottom right

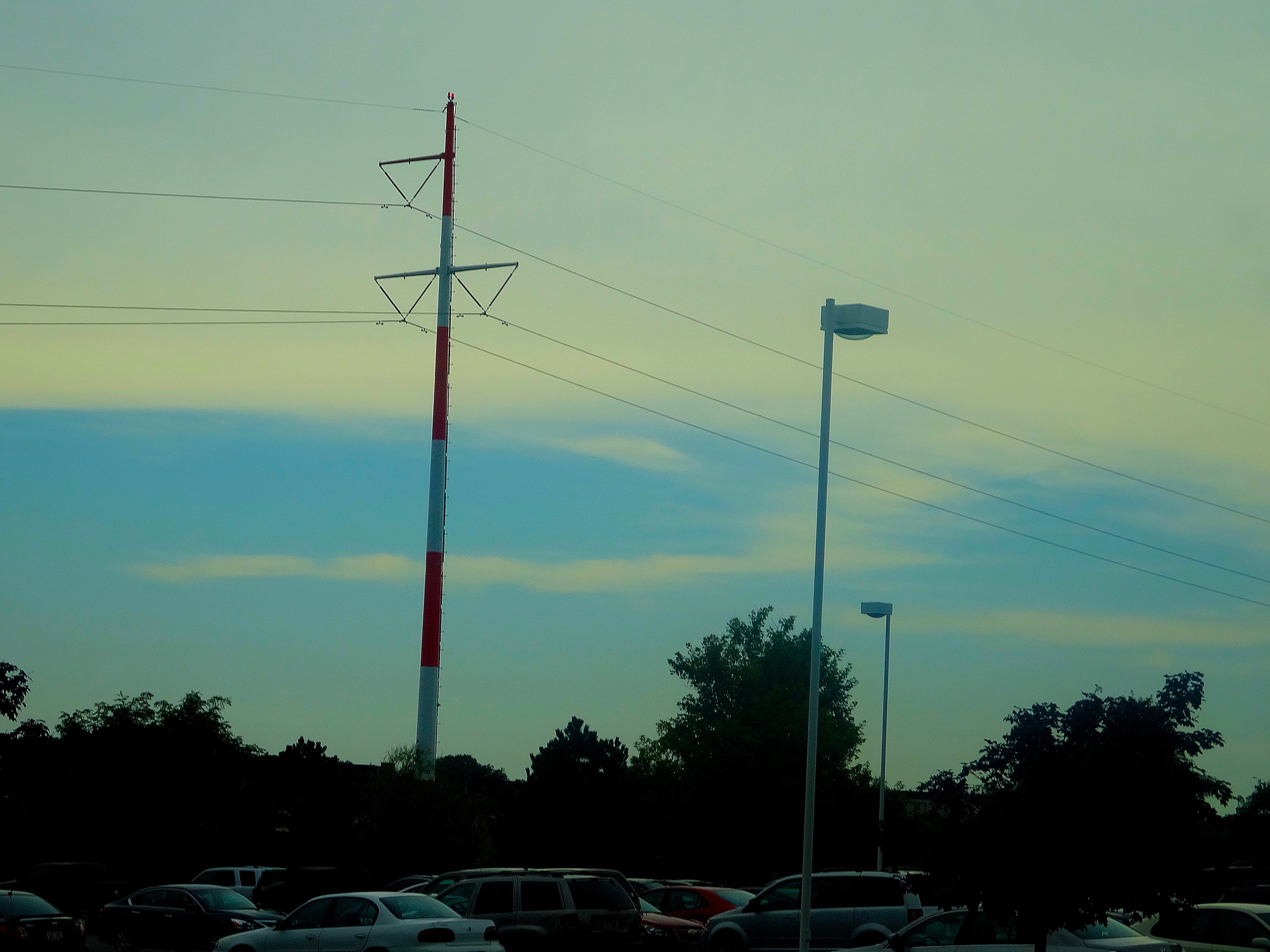
Red and White transmission tower in Madison, Wisconsin

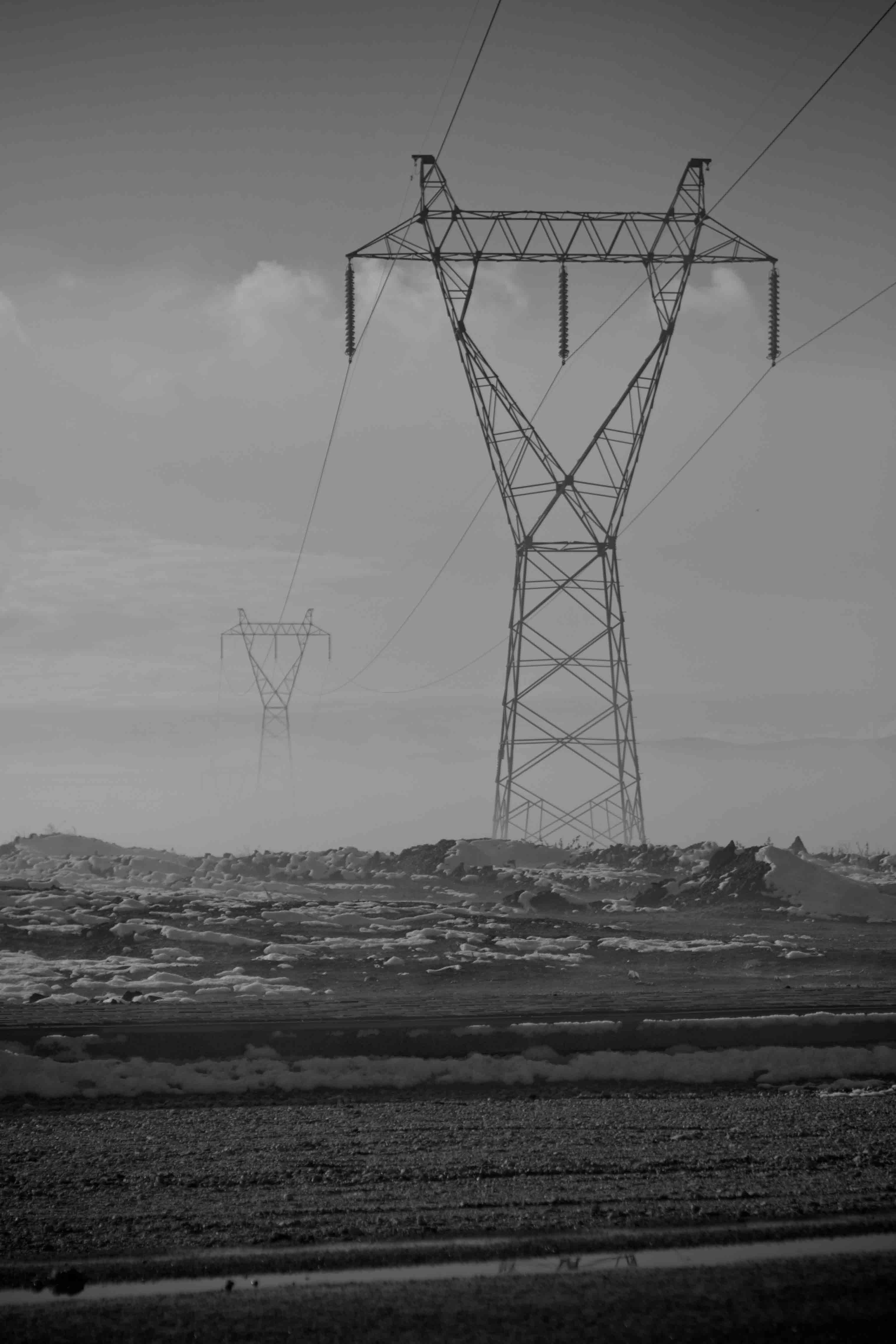
The Deltamast was a triangular shaped electricity pylon

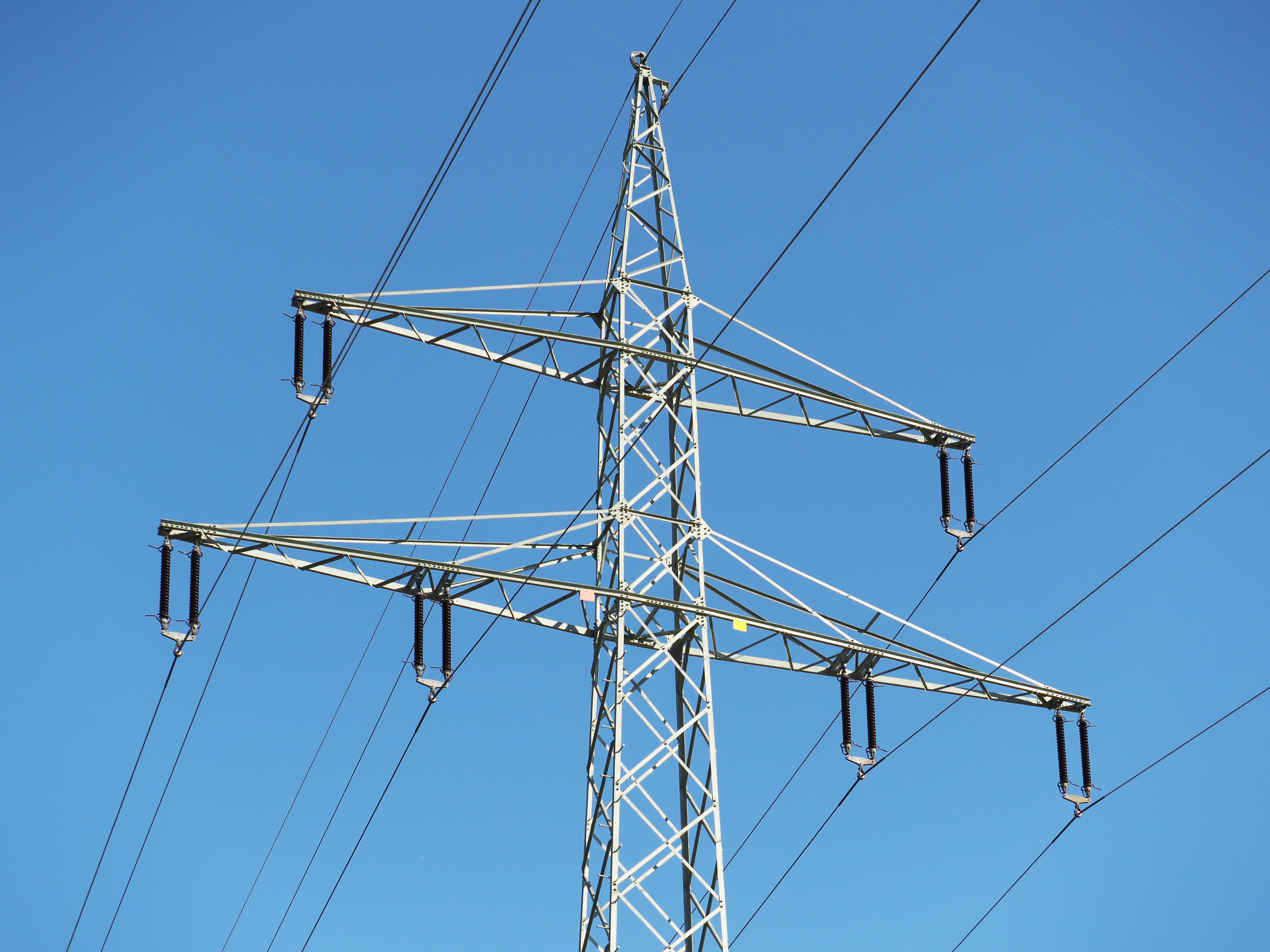
Top part of a "Donaumast" a two row pylon in Pfahlbronn

== History ==
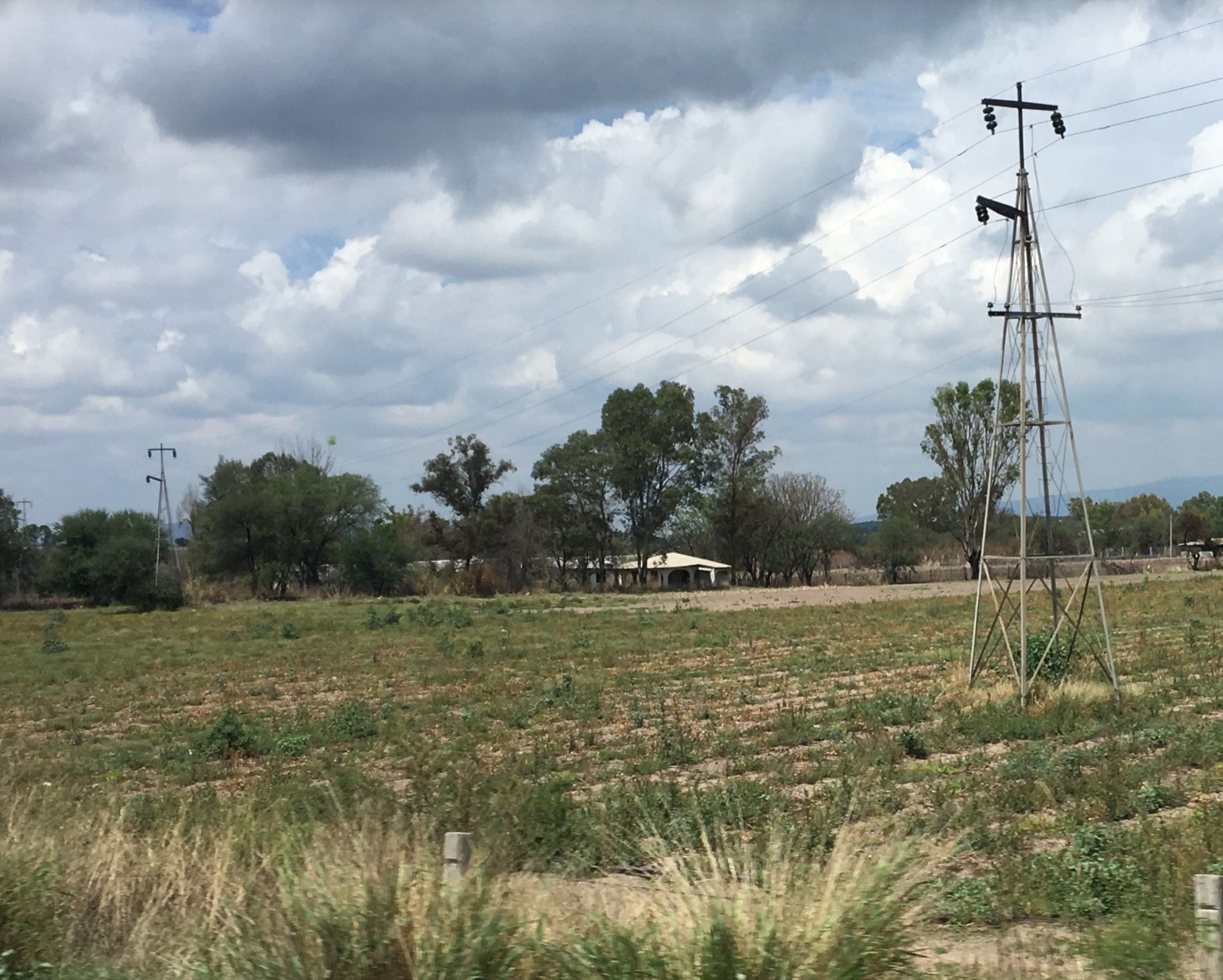
Towers of former power line Zamora - Guanajuato in 2017

The first sketch for a transmission tower was made by the Pittsburgh Bridge Company in 1894 for a two-circuit three-phase AC power line from Niagara to Buffalo. They chose to place the power line on wooden poles. In 1901, two large towers for the Carquinez Strait Powerline Crossing were erected. The oldest power line entirely placed on steel towers was between Zamora de Hidalgo and Guanajuato in 1903. Despite the age, some towers from this power line are still in service as of 2025, serving for medium-voltage distribution. Another power line on steel towers existed in 1904 in Italy.

== High voltage AC transmission towers ==
Three-phase electric power systems are used for high voltage (66- or 69-kV and above) and extra-high voltage (110- or 115-kV and above; most often 138- or 230-kV and above in contemporary systems) AC transmission lines. In some European countries, e.g. Germany, Spain or Czech Republic, smaller lattice towers are used for medium voltage (above 10 kV) transmission lines as well. The towers must be designed to carry three (or multiples of three) conductors. The towers are usually steel lattices or trusses (wooden structures are used in Australia, Canada, Germany, and Scandinavia in some cases) and the insulators are either glass or porcelain discs or composite insulators using silicone rubber or EPDM rubber material assembled in strings or long rods whose lengths are dependent on the line voltage and environmental conditions.

Typically, one or two ground wires, also called "guard" wires, are placed on top to intercept lightning and harmlessly divert it to the ground.

Towers for high- and extra-high voltage are usually designed to carry two or more electric circuits. If a line is constructed using towers designed to carry several circuits, it is not necessary to install all the circuits at the time of construction. For economic reasons, some transmission lines are designed for three (or four) circuits, but only two (or three) circuits are initially installed.

Some high voltage circuits are often erected on the same tower as 110 kV lines. Paralleling circuits of 380 kV, 220 kV and 110 kV-lines on the same towers is common. Sometimes, especially with 110 kV circuits, a parallel circuit carries traction lines for railway electrification.

== High voltage DC transmission towers ==
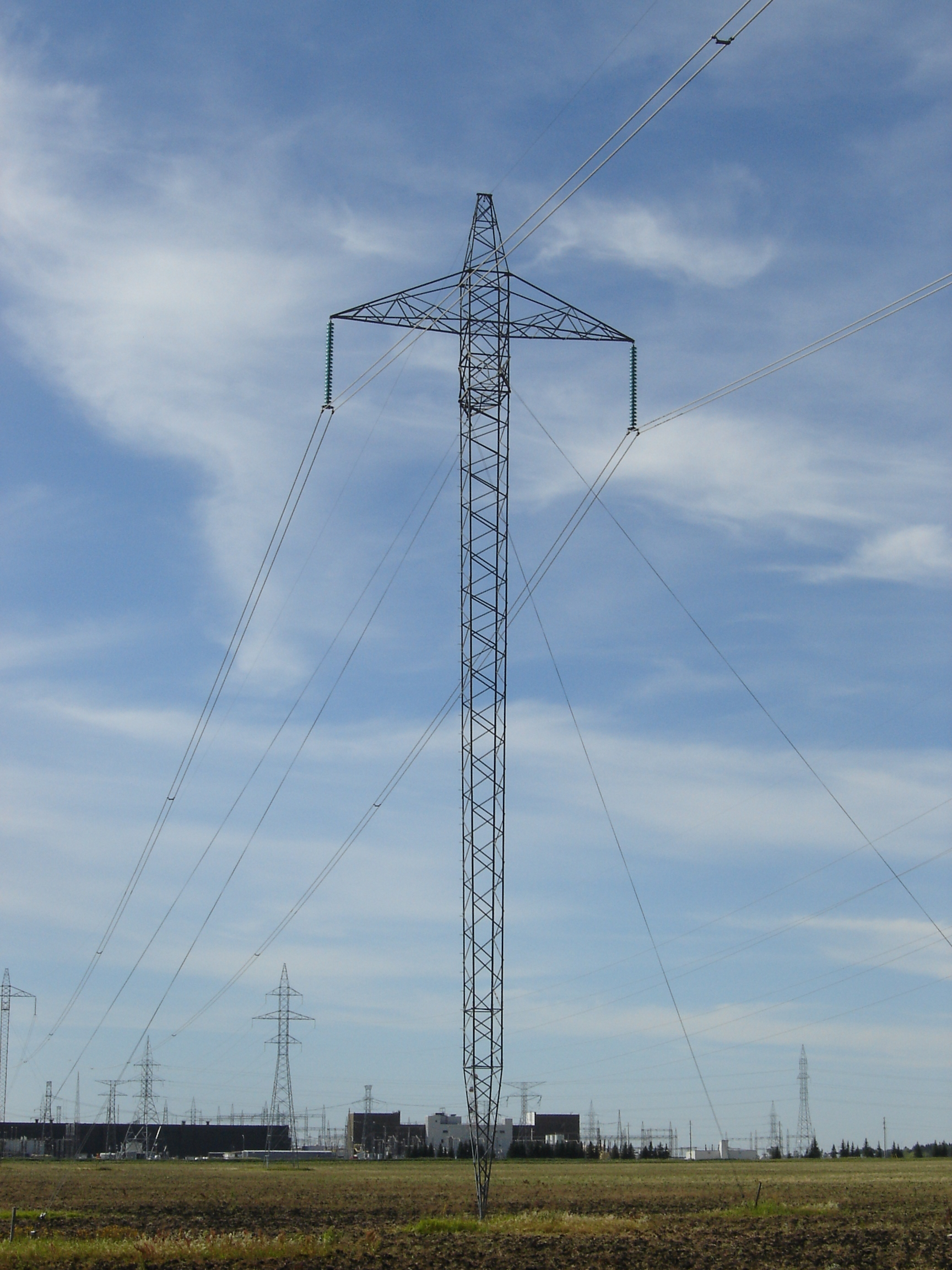
HVDC distance tower near the Nelson River Bipole

High-voltage direct current (HVDC) transmission lines are either monopolar or bipolar systems. With bipolar systems, a conductor arrangement with one conductor on each side of the tower is used. On some schemes, the ground conductor is used as electrode line or ground return. In this case, it had to be installed with insulators equipped with surge arresters on the pylons in order to prevent electrochemical corrosion of the pylons. For single-pole HVDC transmission with ground return, towers with only one conductor can be used. In many cases, however, the towers are designed for later conversion to a two-pole system. In these cases, often conductors on both sides of the tower are installed for mechanical reasons. Until the second pole is needed, it is either used as electrode line or joined in parallel with the pole in use. In the latter case, the line from the converter station to the earthing (grounding) electrode is built as underground cable, as overhead line on a separate right of way or by using the ground conductors.

Electrode line towers are used in some HVDC schemes to carry the power line from the converter station to the grounding electrode. They are similar to structures used for lines with voltages of 10–30 kV, but normally carry only one or two conductors.

AC transmission towers may be converted to full or mixed HVDC use, to increase power transmission levels at a lower cost than building a new transmission line.

== Railway traction line towers ==
Towers used for single-phase AC railway traction lines are similar in construction to those towers used for 110 kV three-phase lines. Steel tube or concrete poles are also often used for these lines. However, railway traction current systems are two-pole AC systems, so traction lines are designed for two conductors (or multiples of two, usually four, eight, or twelve). These are usually arranged on one level, whereby each circuit occupies one half of the cross arm. For four traction circuits, the arrangement of the conductors is in two levels and for six electric circuits, the arrangement of the conductors is in three levels.

== Hybrid lines ==
It is possible that on electricity pylons AC circuits of different frequency and phase-count, or AC and DC circuits are installed.

Before the realization of the Ultranet HVDC line, which uses in most parts towers equipped with AC circuits and the DC circuit of Ultranet, towers carrying AC and DC circuits were very rare. There existed only two short sections with such installation: one was the terminal of HVDC Volgograd-Donbass on Volga Hydroelectric Power Station, the other were two towers south of Stenkullen, which carried one circuit of HVDC Konti-Skan and one circuit of the three-phase AC line Stenkullen-Holmbakullen.

Towers carrying AC circuits and DC electrode lines are a bit more common:

- The pylons of a section of the AC-powerline between Adalph Static Inverter Plant and Brookston carry also the electrode line of HVDC Square Butte from Adalph Static Inverter Plant to a point situated at 46.924659 N 92.697275 W as one ground conductor.
- The electrode line of HVDC CU at the converter station at Coal Creek Station uses on a short section the towers of two AC lines as support.
- The metallic return of HVDC Vancouver Island is partly installed on poles that carry also AC-circuits. The longest section where the metallic return is installed on pylons that carry also AC circuits is on the Canadian mainland between 49.040333N 123.07579 W and 49.060995 N 123.044664 W with a length of 4.59 kilometres.
- The overhead section of the two conductors of the electrode line of Pacific DC Intertie from Sylmar Converter Station to the grounding electrode in the Pacific Ocean near Will Rogers State Beach is also installed on pylons for 230 kV AC as ground conductor. It runs from Sylmar East Converter Station via Rinaldi Receiving Station, Receiving Station J (Northridge) and Receiving Station U (Tarzana) to Southern California Edison Malibu Substation, where the overhead line section ends, which serves also as ground conductor.
  Between Sylmar East Converter Station and Rinaldi Receiving Station and between Receiving Station J (Northridge) and Southern California Edison Malibu Substation both electrode line conductors share the same pylon [https:/ /maps.app.goo.gl/ouAGLV8hvqksfjWQ6], [https:/ /maps.app.goo.gl/FJ9rz5Q62QqGmwNz6] , while between Rinaldi Receiving Station and Receiving Station J (Northridge) each conductor replaces one ground conductor of two parallel power lines each equipped with two ground conductors [https:/ /maps.app.goo.gl/zkGvDbmb8ogw1Y6Y6].

Two parallel running powerlines each carrying circuits of the public grid and circuits of the railway company near Kornwestheim, Germany

Much more common are electricity pylons that carry as well circuits of the public AC grid and circuits of the AC grid of the national railway company. Such towers may exist in countries where the national railway company uses AC with a frequency which is different from the AC grid of the public grid. Especially in Switzerland and Germany such lines are not rare.

== Tower designs ==
Transmission towers must withstand various external forces, including wind, ice, and seismic activity, while supporting the weight of heavy conductors.

=== Shape ===
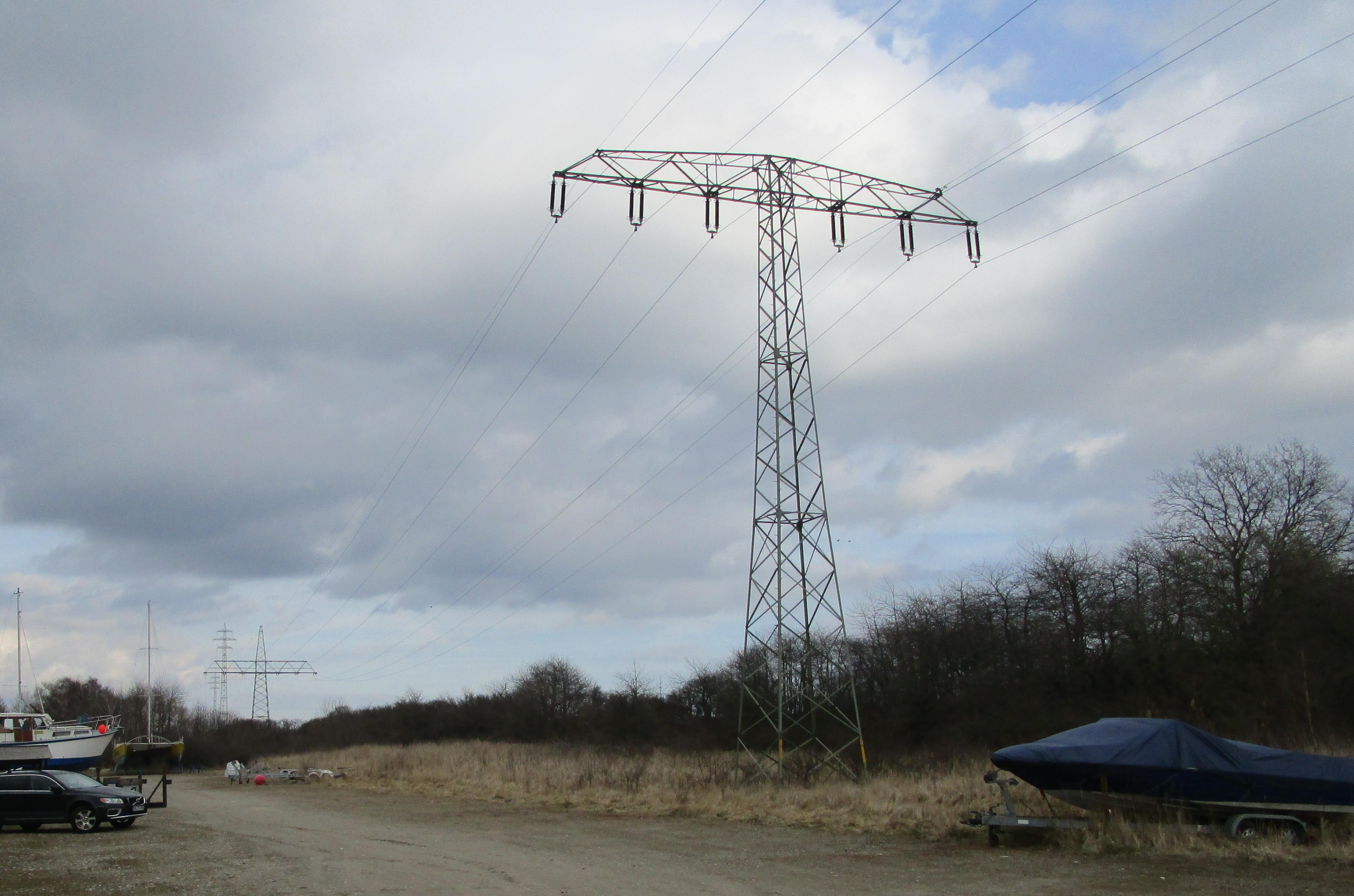
Typical T-shaped 110 kV tower from the former GDR

Different shapes of transmission towers are typical for different countries. The shape also depends on voltage and number of circuits.

==== One circuit ====
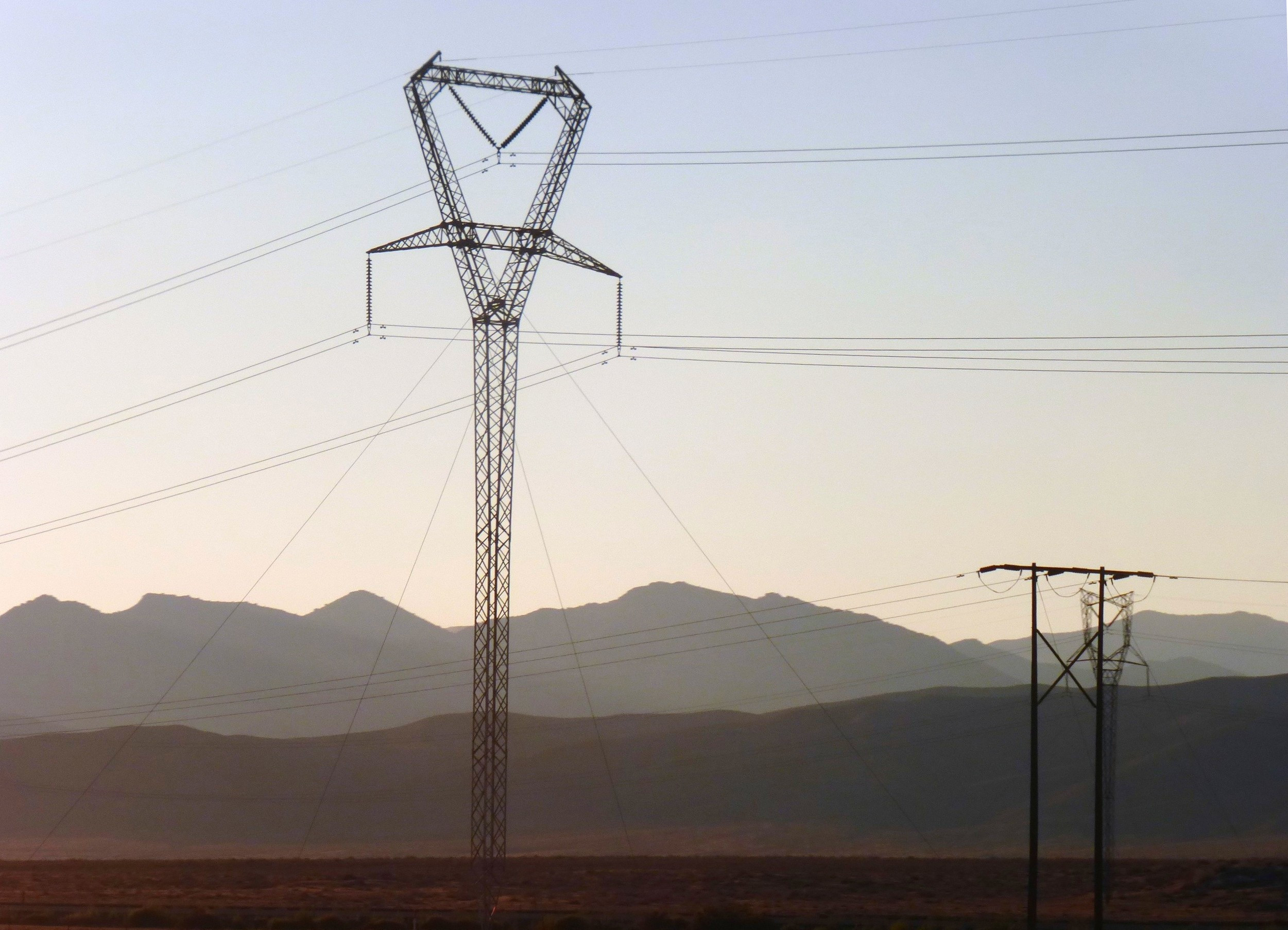
Guyed "Delta" transmission tower (a combination of guyed "V" and "Y") in Nevada

Delta pylons are the most common design for single circuit lines, because of their stability. They have a V-shaped body with a horizontal arm on the top, which forms an inverted delta. Larger Delta towers usually use two guard cables.

Portal pylons are widely used in the US, Ireland, Scandinavia and Canada. They stand on two legs with one cross arm, which gives them an H-shape. Up to 110 kV, they were often made from wood, but higher voltage lines use steel pylons.

Smaller single circuit pylons may have two small cross arms on one side and one on the other.

==== Two circuits ====
One level pylons only have one cross arm carrying 3 cables on each side. Sometimes they have an additional cross arm for the protection cables. They are frequently used close to airports due to their reduced height.

Danube pylons, or Donaumasten, got their name from a line built in 1927 next to the Danube river. They are the most common design in central European countries like Germany or Poland. They have two cross arms, the upper arm carries one and the lower arm carries two cables on each side. Sometimes they have an additional cross arm for the protection cables.

Ton-shaped towers are the most common design, they have 3 horizontal levels with one cable very close to the pylon on each side tower. In the United Kingdom the second level is often (but not always) wider than the other ones while in the United States all cross arms have the same width.

===== T-pylons =====
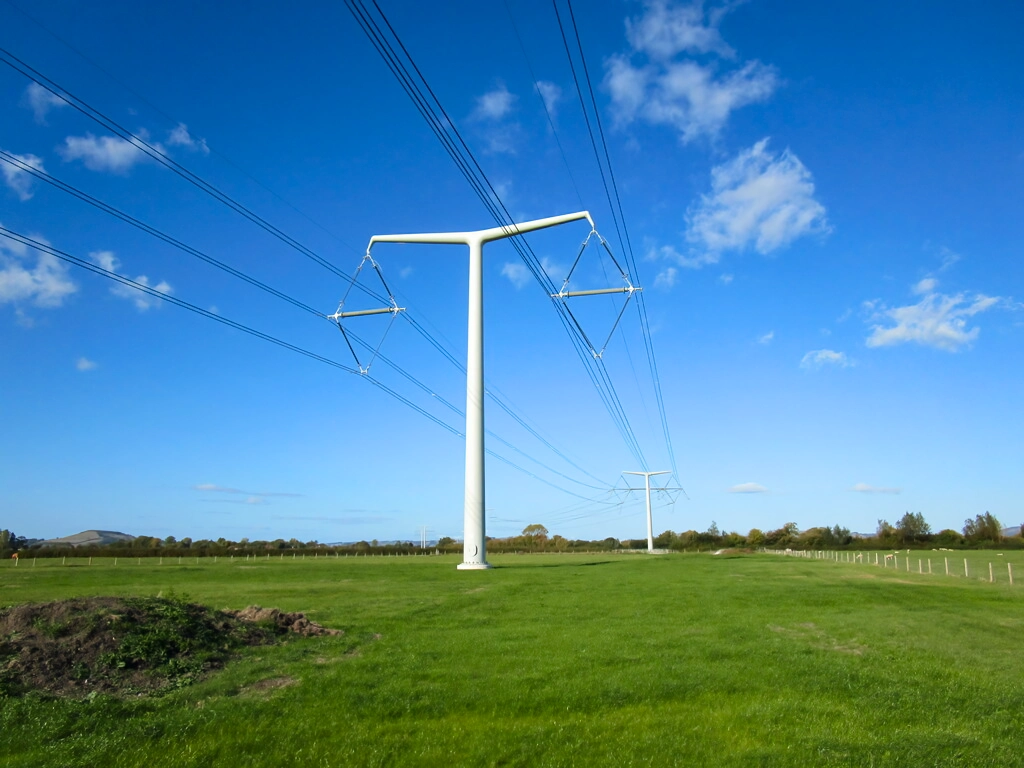
T-pylons in Somerset, England

In 2021 the first T-pylon, a new tubular T-shaped design, was installed in United Kingdom for a new power line to Hinkley Point C nuclear power station, carrying two high voltage 400 kV power lines. The design features electricity cables strung below a cross-arm atop a single pole which reduces the visual impact on the environment compared to lattice pylons. These 36 T-pylons were the first major UK redesign since 1927, designed by Danish company Bystrup, winner of a 2011 competition from more than 250 entries held by the Royal Institute of British Architects and Her Majesty's Government.

===== Y-pylons =====
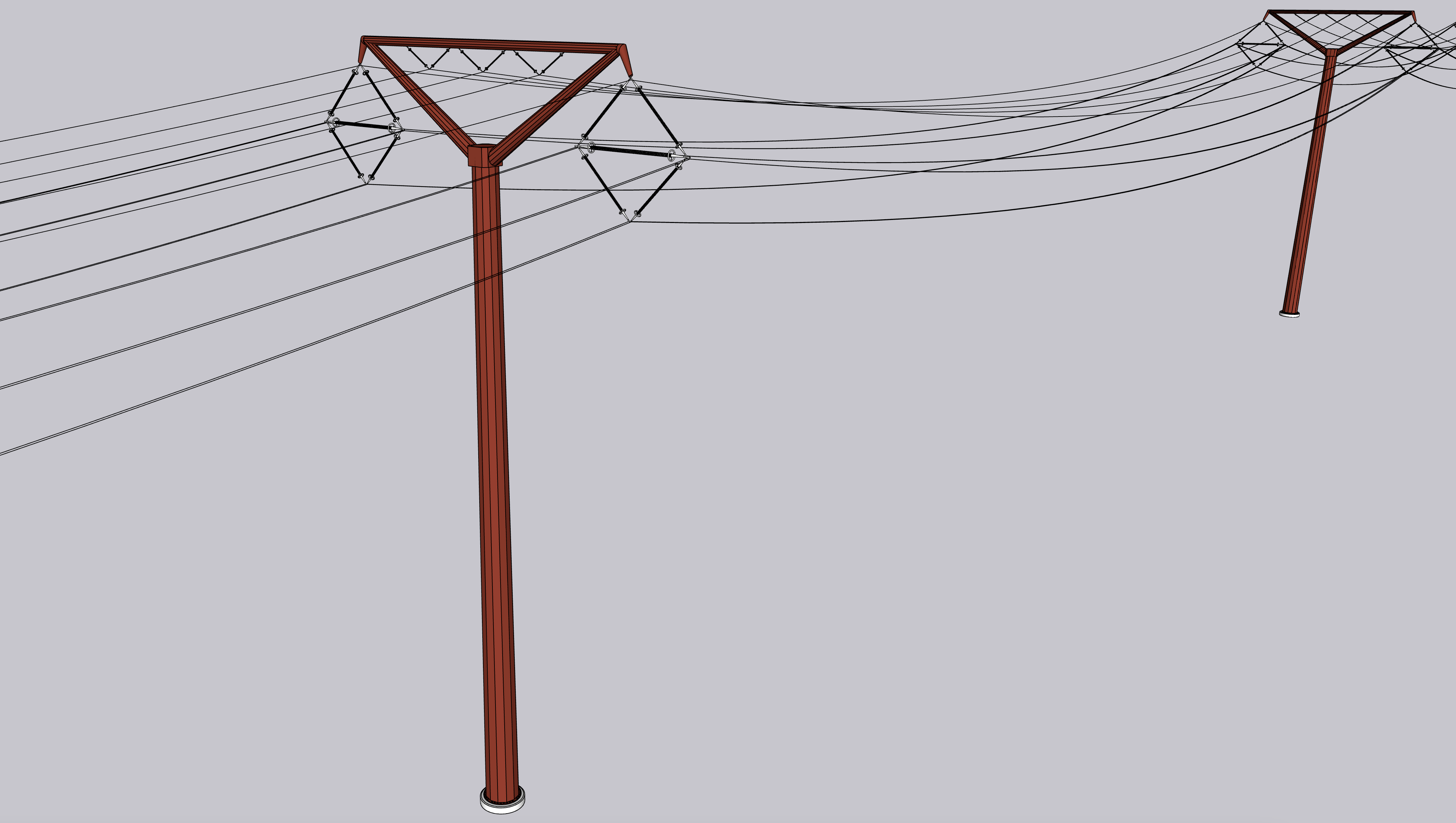
Y-pylon with support beam

Y-pylons are a newer concept for electrical transmission towers. They usually have a guy-wire or support beam to help support the "Y" shape in the tower.

==== Four circuits ====
Christmas-tree-shaped towers for 4 or even 6 circuits are common in Germany and have 3 cross arms where the highest arm has each one cable, the second has two cables and the third has three cables on each side. The cables on the third arm usually carry circuits for lower high voltage.

==== Branch pylons ====
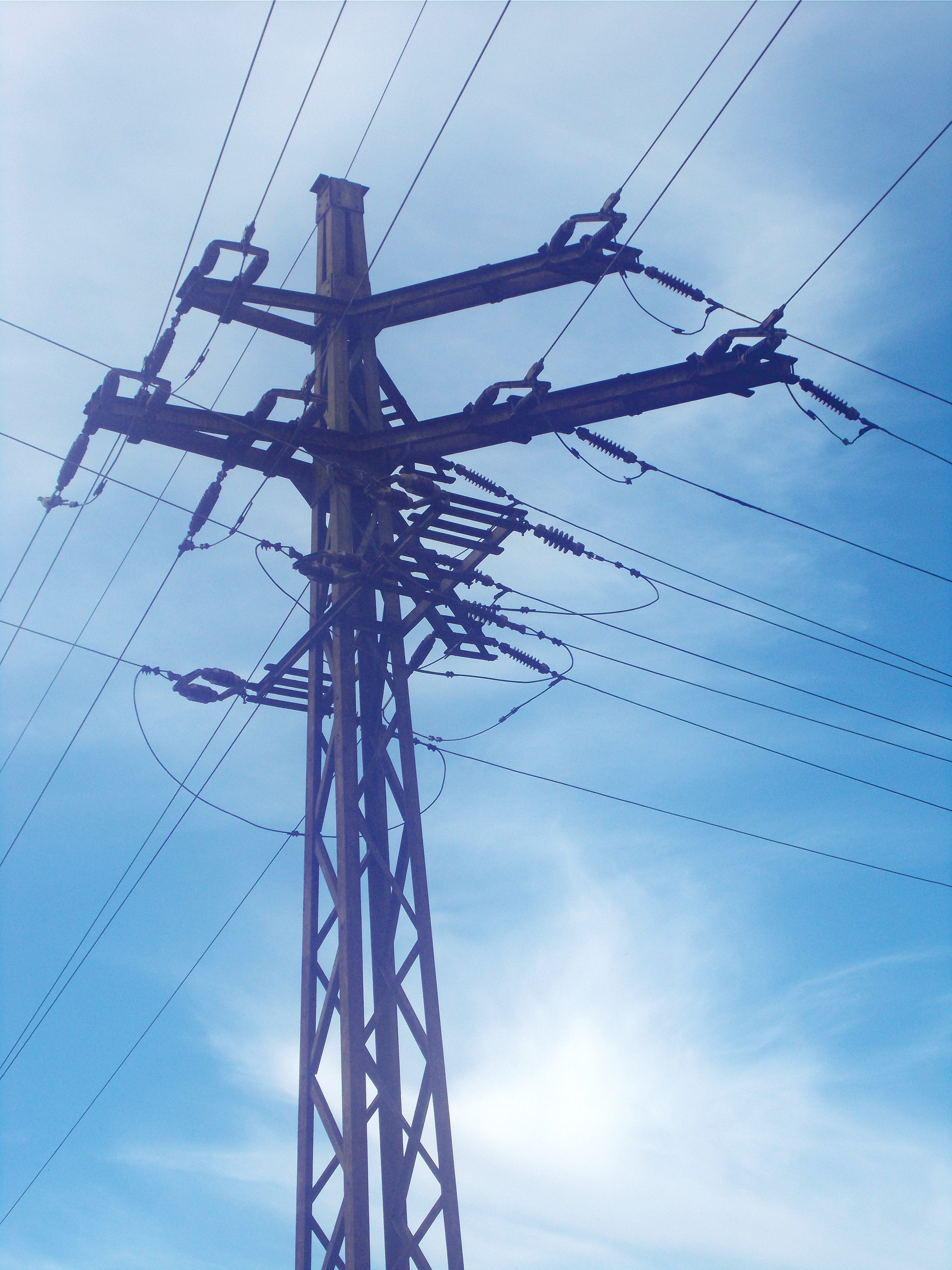
Branch pylon with a triangular shape

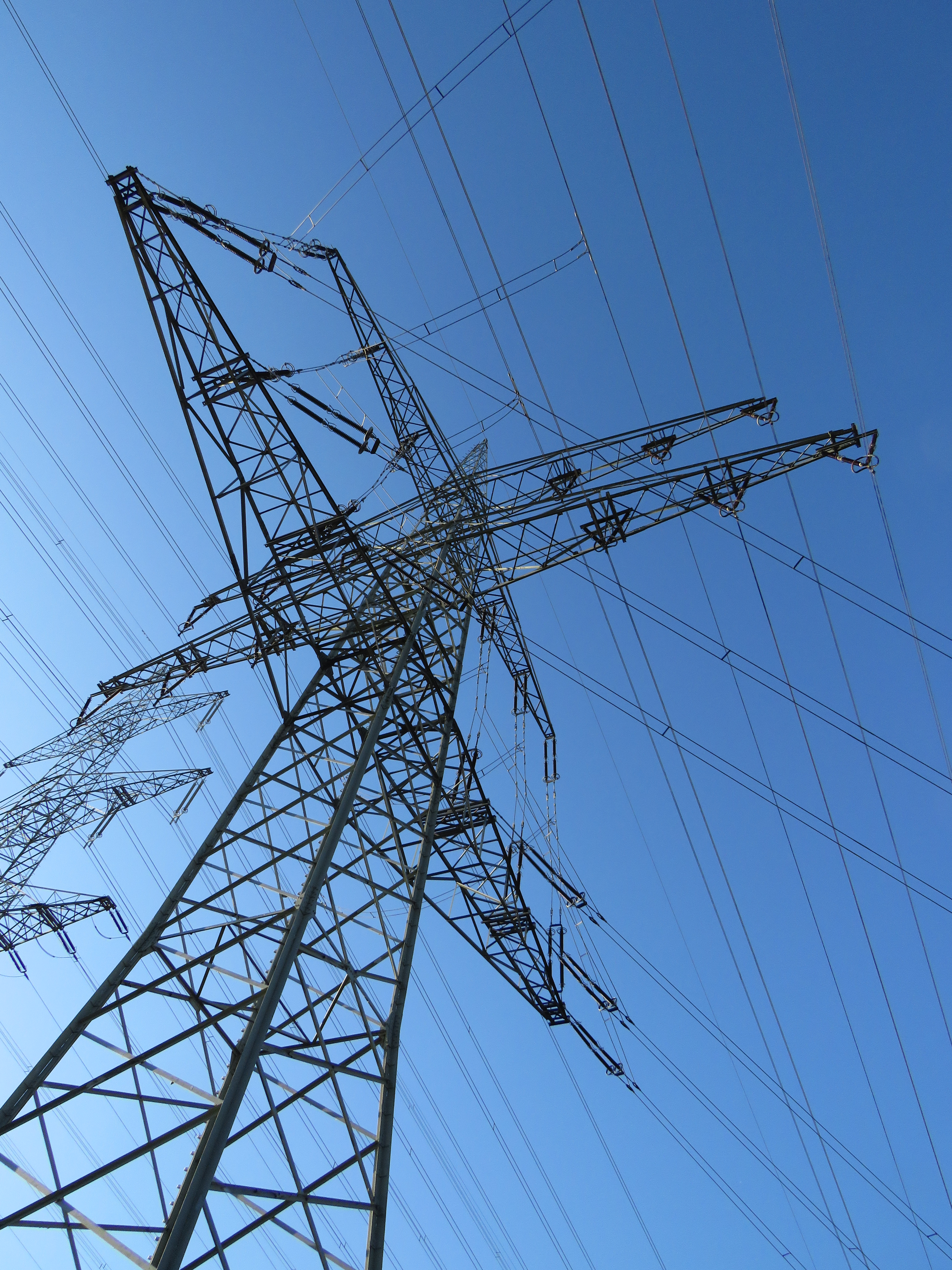
A 220-kV-Anlage branch pylon at Dörnigheim substation

Special designed pylons are necessary to introduce branching lines, e.g. to connect nearby substations.

=== Support structures ===
Towers may be self-supporting and capable of resisting all forces due to conductor loads, unbalanced conductors, wind and ice in any direction. Such towers often have approximately square bases and usually four points of contact with the ground.

A semi-flexible tower is designed so that it can use overhead grounding wires to transfer mechanical load to adjacent structures, if a phase conductor breaks and the structure is subject to unbalanced loads. This type is useful at extra-high voltages, where phase conductors are bundled (two or more wires per phase). It is unlikely for all of them to break at once, barring a catastrophic crash or storm.

A guyed mast has a very small footprint and relies on guy wires in tension to support the structure and any unbalanced tension load from the conductors. A guyed tower can be made in a V shape, which saves weight and cost.

=== Materials ===
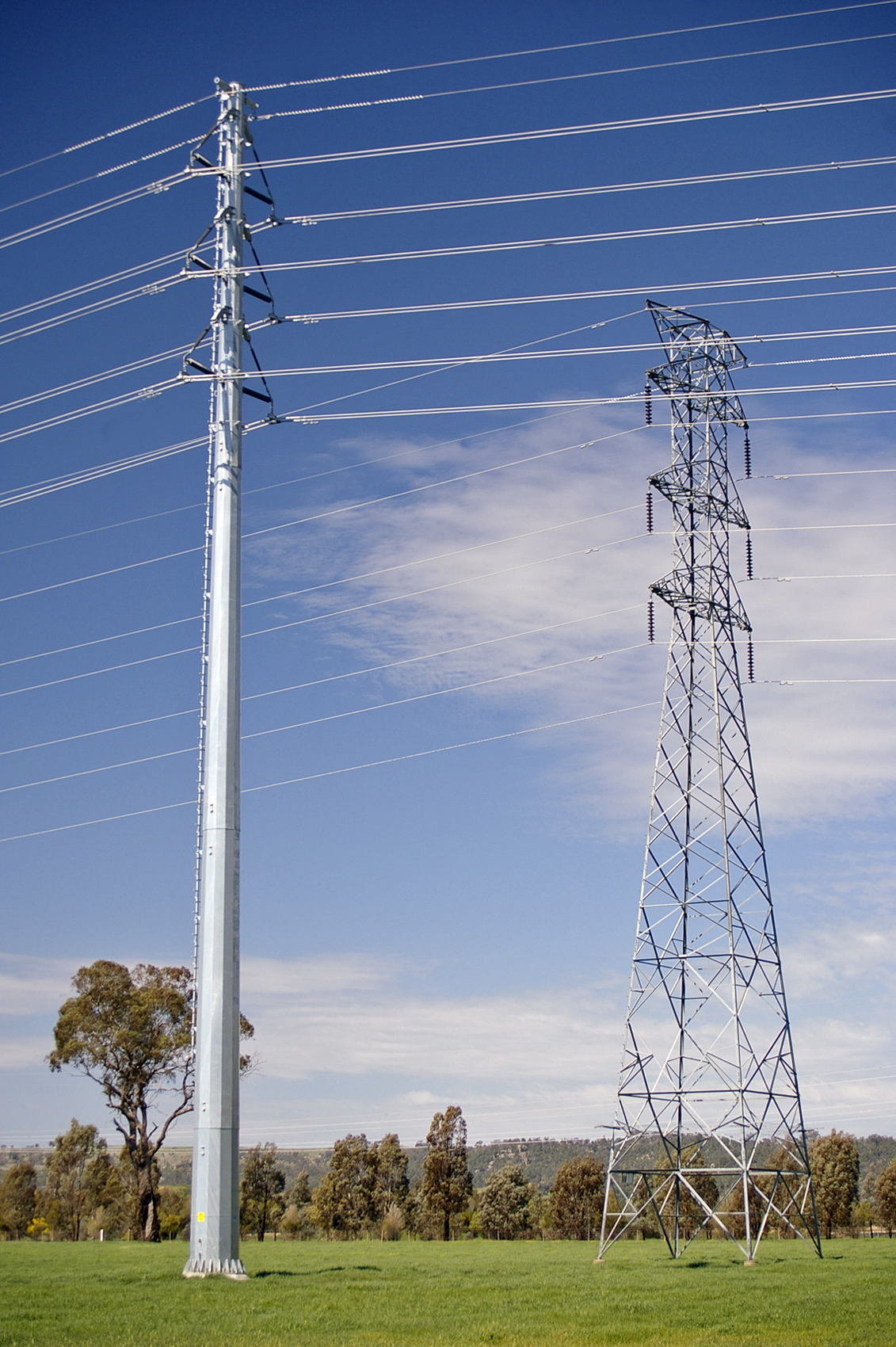
Steel tube tower next to older lattice tower near Wagga Wagga, Australia

==== Tubular steel ====
Poles made of tubular steel generally are assembled at the factory and placed on the right-of-way afterward. Because of its durability and ease of manufacturing and installation, many utilities in recent years prefer the use of monopolar steel or concrete towers over lattice steel for new power lines and tower replacements.

In Germany, steel tube pylons are also established predominantly for medium voltage lines, in addition, for high voltage transmission lines or two electric circuits for operating voltages by up to 110 kV. Steel tube pylons are also frequently used for 380 kV lines in France, and for 500 kV lines in the United States.

==== Lattice ====
A lattice tower is a framework construction made of steel or aluminium sections. Lattice towers are used for power lines of all voltages, and are the most common type for high-voltage transmission lines. Lattice towers are usually made of galvanized steel. Aluminium is used for reduced weight, such as in mountainous areas where structures are placed by helicopter. Aluminium is also used in environments that would be corrosive to steel. The extra material cost of aluminium towers will be offset by lower installation cost. Design of aluminium lattice towers is similar to that for steel, but must take into account aluminium's lower Young's modulus.

A lattice tower is usually assembled at the location where it is to be erected. This makes very tall towers possible, up to 100 m (328 ft) (and in special cases even higher, as in the Elbe crossing 1 and Elbe crossing 2). Assembly of lattice steel towers can be done using a crane. Lattice steel towers are generally made of angle-profiled steel beams (L-beam or T-beams). For very tall towers, trusses are often used.

==== Wood ====
Wood is limited in use in high-voltage transmission. Because of the limited height of available trees, the maximum height of wooden pylons is limited to approximately 30 m (98 ft). Wood is rarely used for lattice framework. Instead, they are used to build multi-pole structures, such as H-frame and K-frame structures. The voltages they carry are also limited, such as in other regions, where wood structures only carry voltages up to approximately 30 kV.

In countries such as Canada or the United States, wooden towers carry voltages up to 345 kV; these can be less costly than steel structures and take advantage of the surge voltage insulating properties of wood. As of 2012, 345 kV lines on wood towers are still in use in the US and some are still being constructed on this technology. Wood can also be used for temporary structures while constructing a permanent replacement.

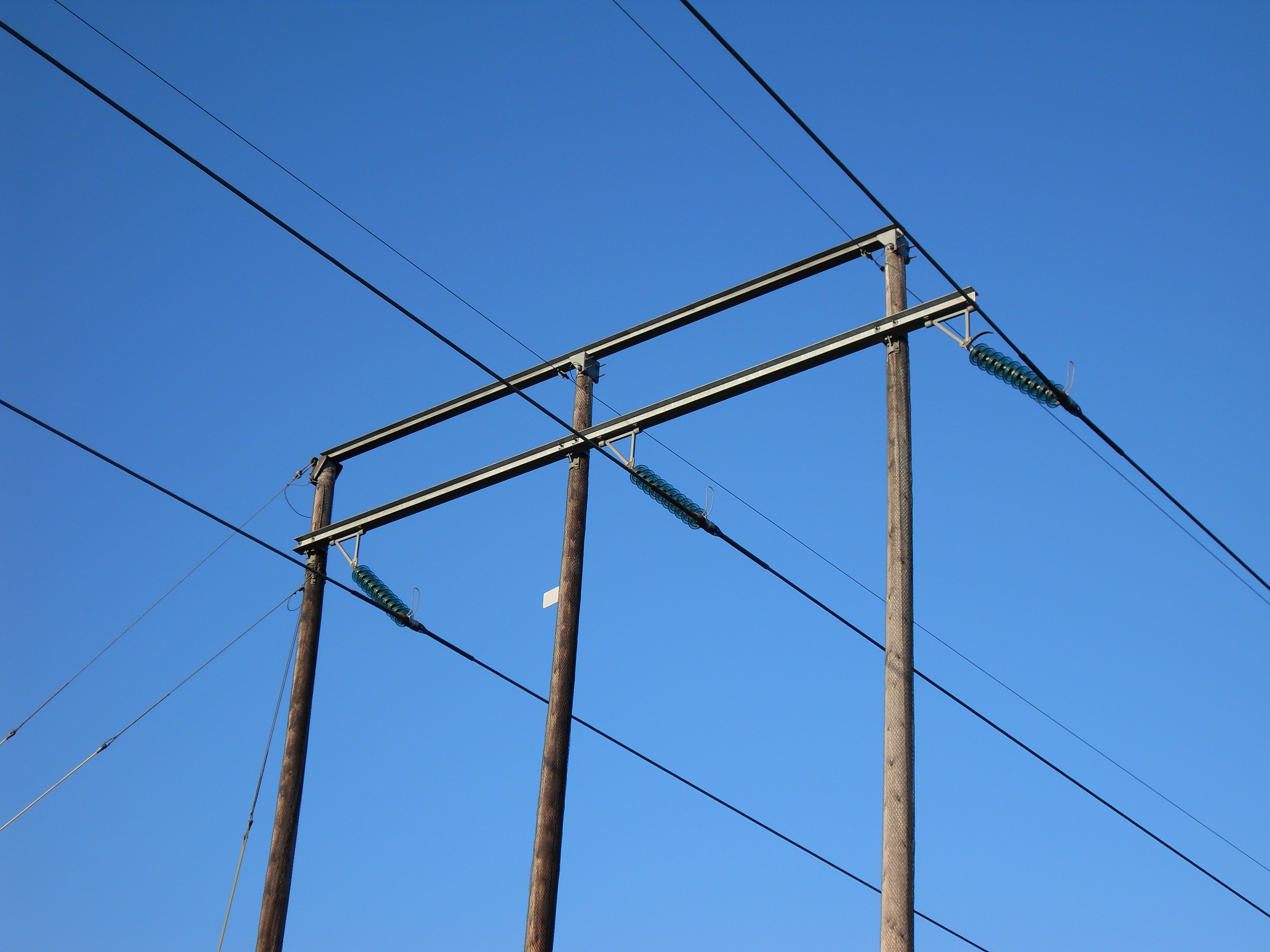
A 3-Frame Wood Pylon in Sweden

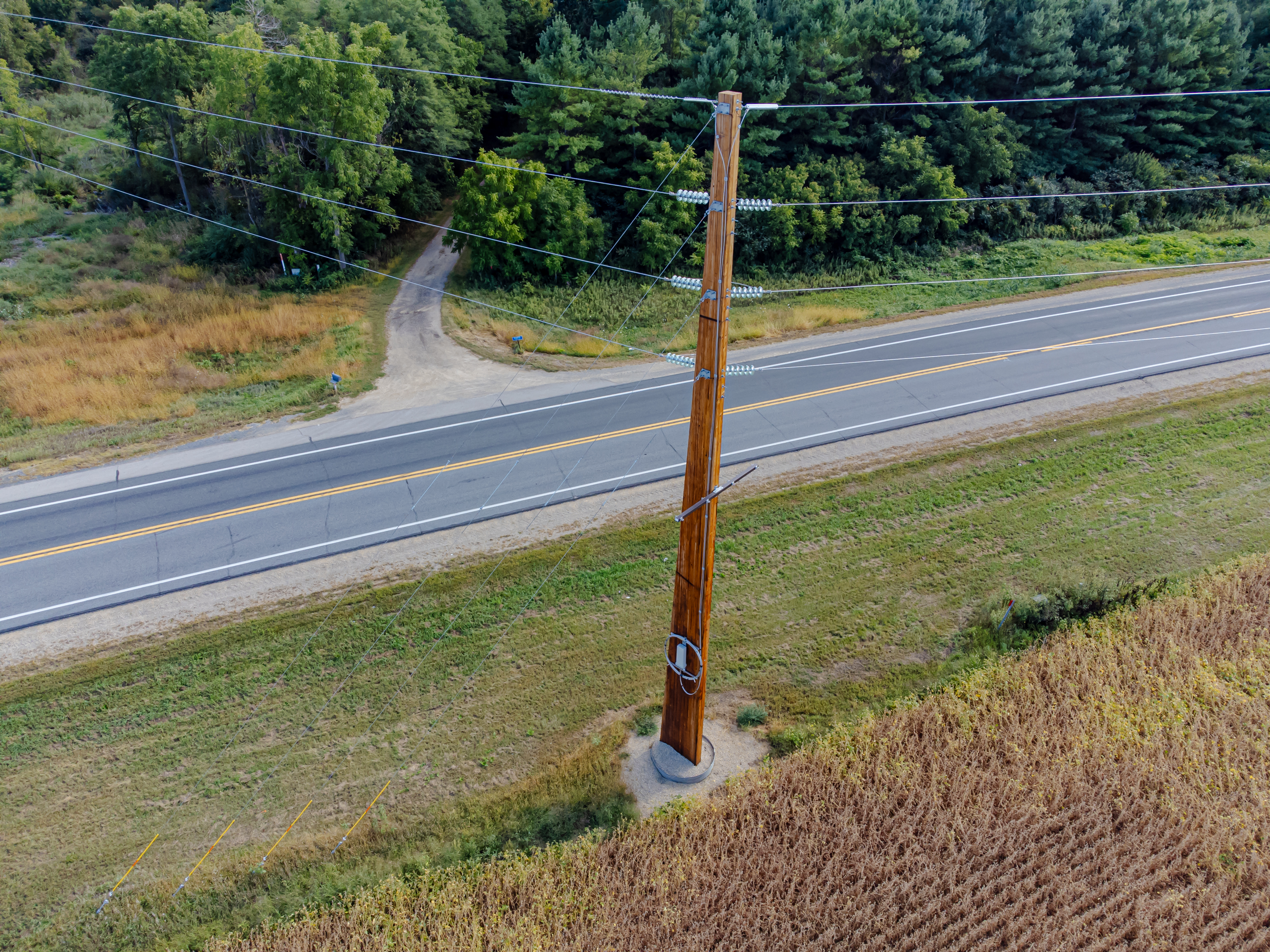
Wood beam transmission tower

==== Concrete ====
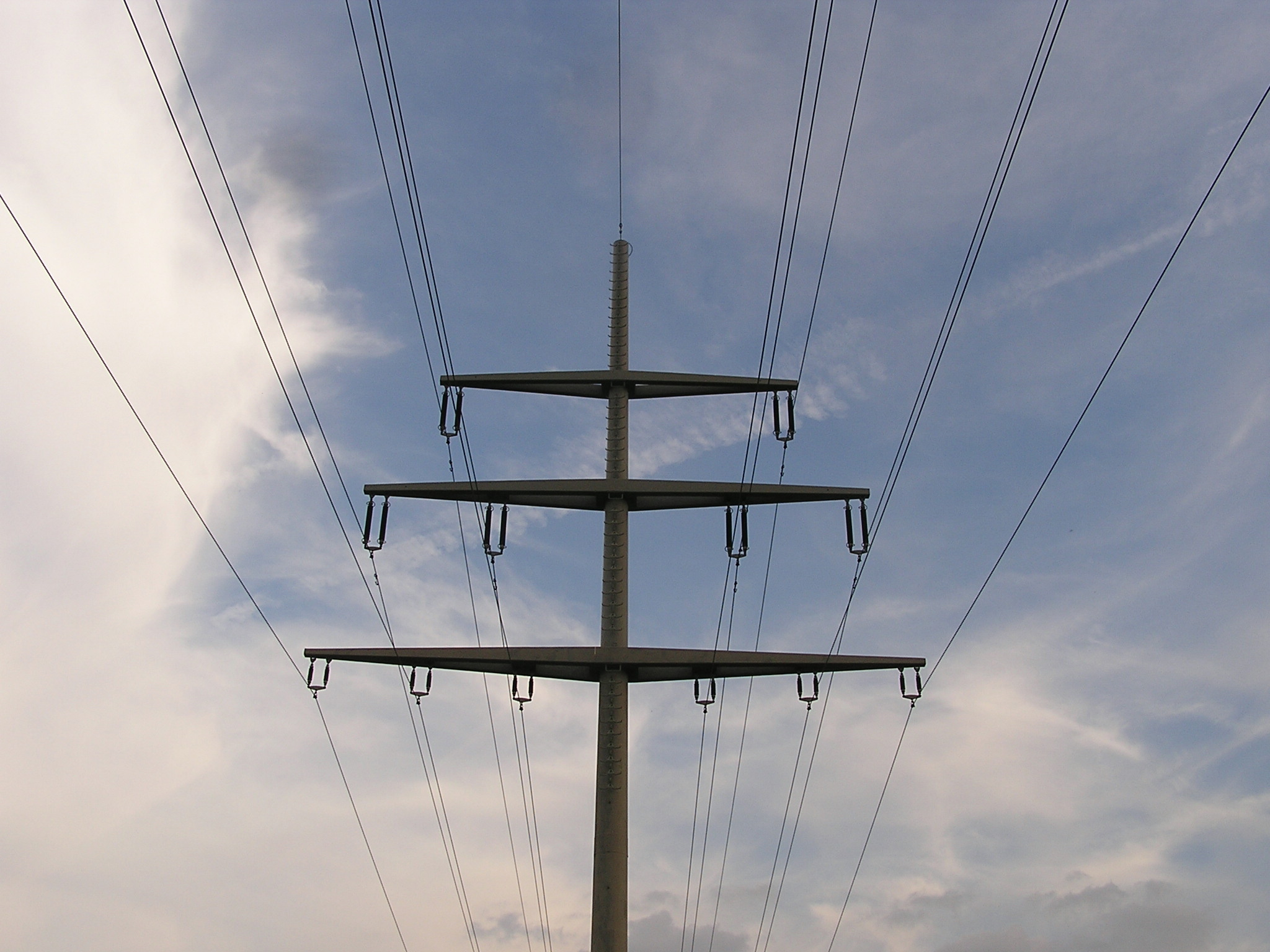
A reinforced concrete pole in Germany

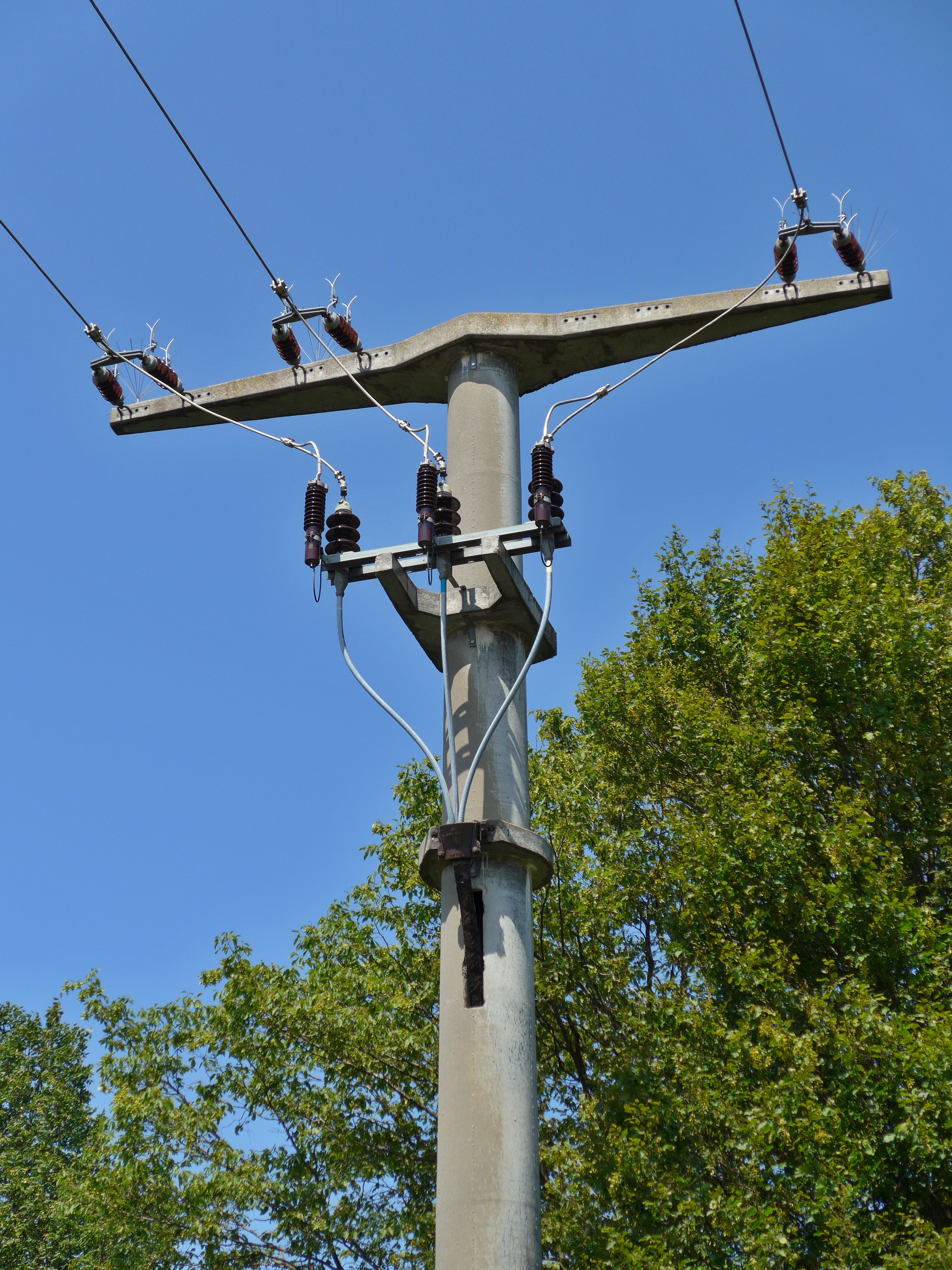
20 Kv Ending concrete pylon

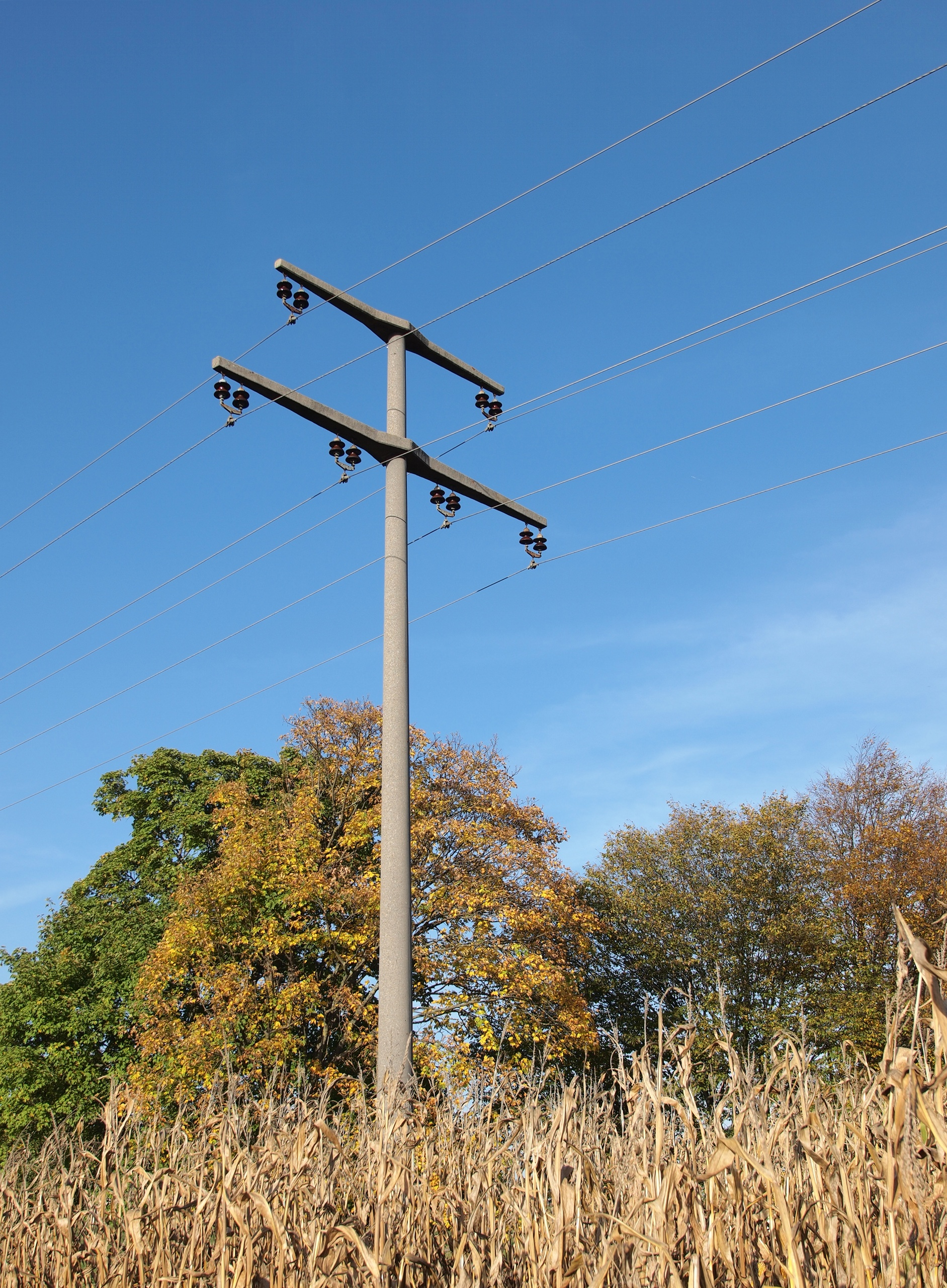

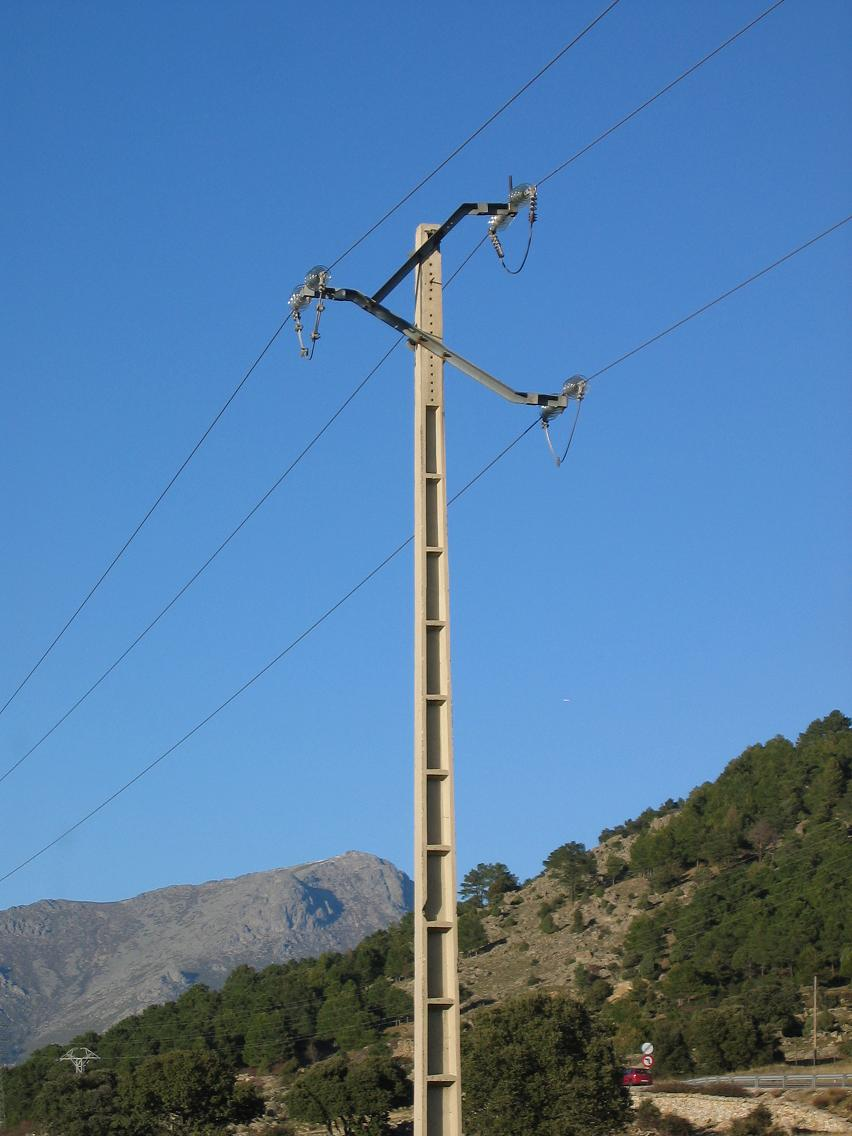
Concrete Pylons

Concrete pylons are used in Germany normally only for lines with operating voltages below 30 kV. In exceptional cases, concrete pylons are used also for 110 kV lines, as well as for the public grid or for the railway traction current grid. Concrete poles for medium-voltage are also used in Canada and the United States.

In Switzerland, concrete pylons with heights of up to 59.5 metres (world's tallest pylon of prefabricated concrete at Littau) are used for 380 kV overhead lines. In Argentina and some other South American countries, many overhead power lines, except the ultra-high voltage grid, were placed on tubular concrete pylons. Also in former soviet countries, concrete pylons are common, though with crossarms made of steel.

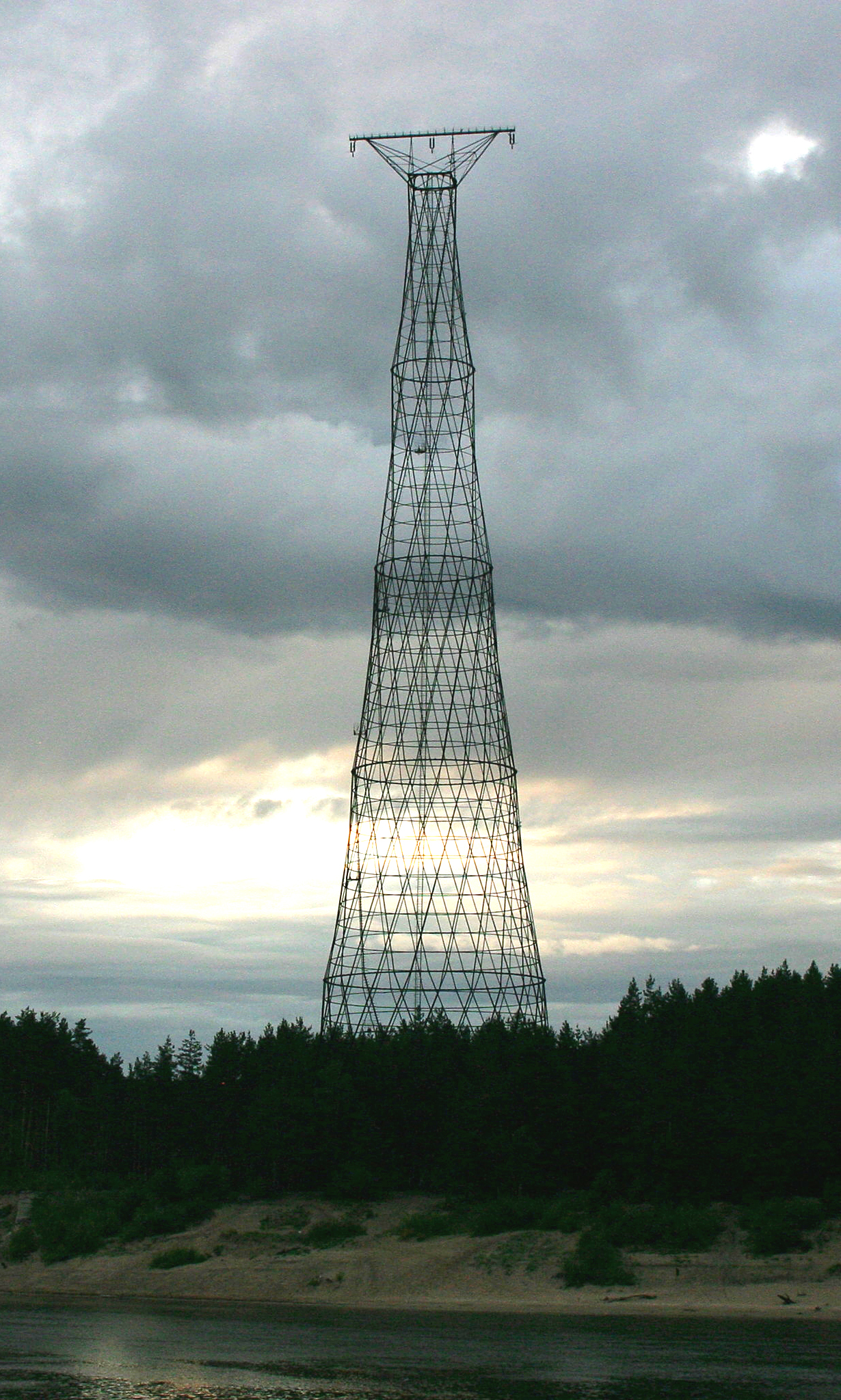
The 220 kV Hyperboloid Structure on the Oka River

Concrete pylons, which are not prefabricated, are also used for constructions taller than 60 metres. One example is a 61.3 m (201 ft) tall pylon of a 380 kV powerline near Reuter West Power Plant in Berlin. In China some pylons for lines crossing rivers were built of concrete. The tallest of these pylons belong to the Yangtze Powerline crossing at Nanjing with a height of 257 m (843 ft).

=== Special ===
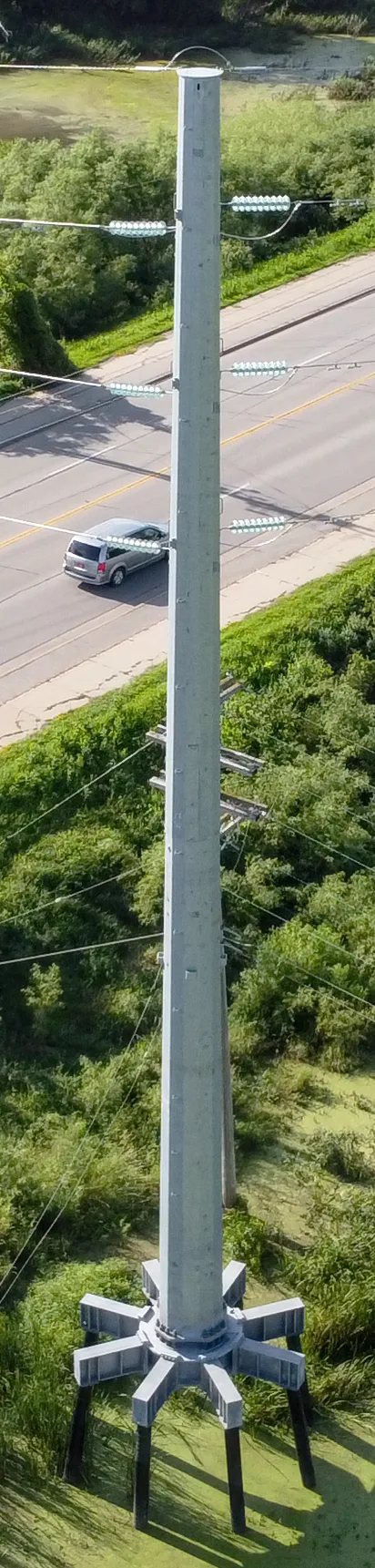
Electric utility pole on piles in the water

Sometimes (in particular on steel lattice towers for the highest voltage levels) transmitting plants are installed, and antennas mounted on the top above or below the overhead ground wire. Usually these installations are for mobile phone services or the operating radio of the power supply firm, but occasionally also for other radio services, like directional radio. Thus transmitting antennas for low-power FM radio and television transmitters were already installed on pylons. On the Elbe Crossing 1 tower, there is a radar facility belonging to the Hamburg water and navigation office.

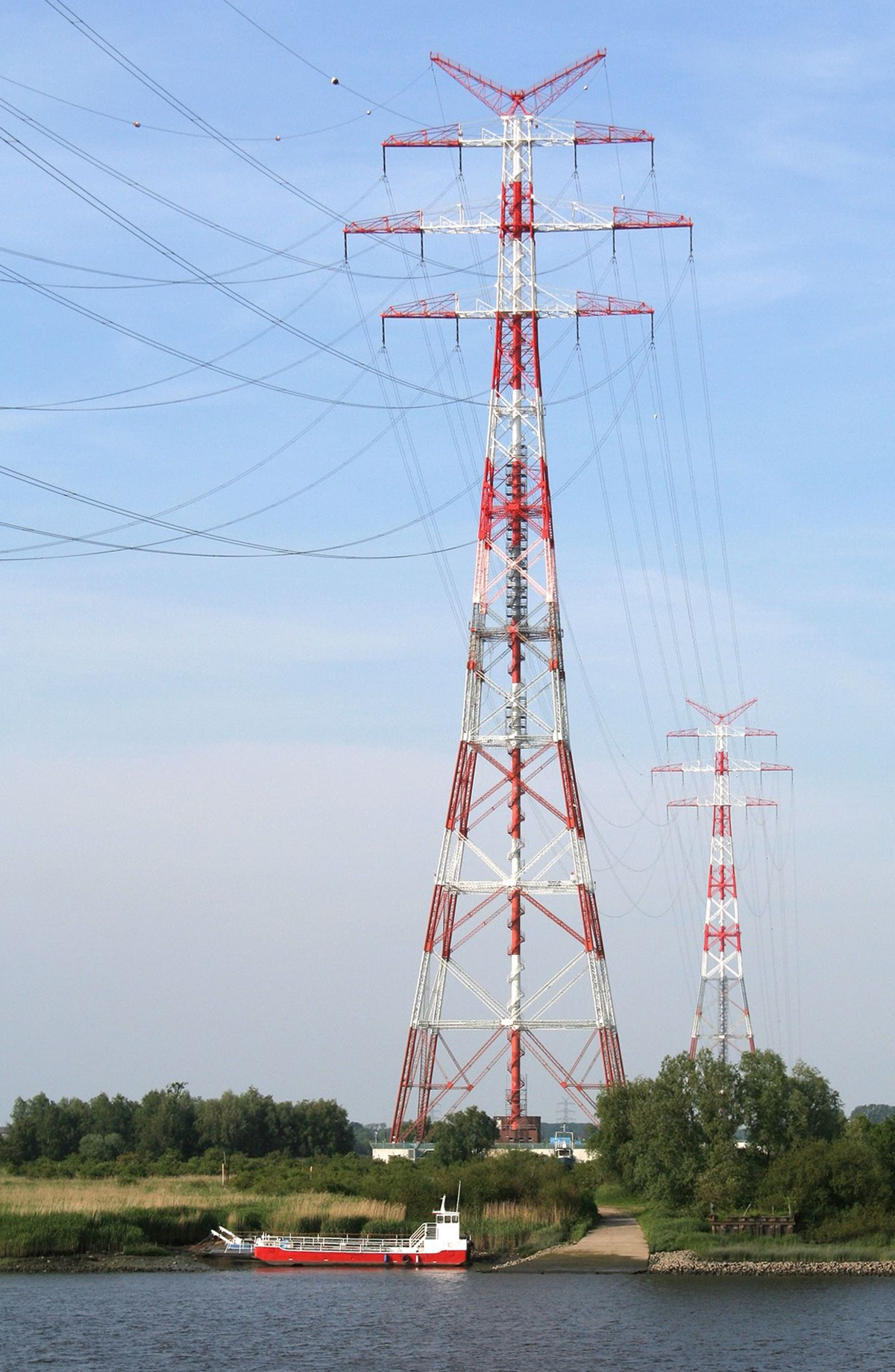
Elbe Crossing 2 in Germany

For crossing broad valleys, a large distance between the conductors must be maintained to avoid short-circuits caused by conductor cables colliding during storms. To achieve this, sometimes a separate mast or tower is used for each conductor. For crossing wide rivers and straits with flat coastlines, very tall towers must be built due to the necessity of a large height clearance for navigation. Such towers and the conductors they carry must be equipped with flight safety lamps and reflectors.

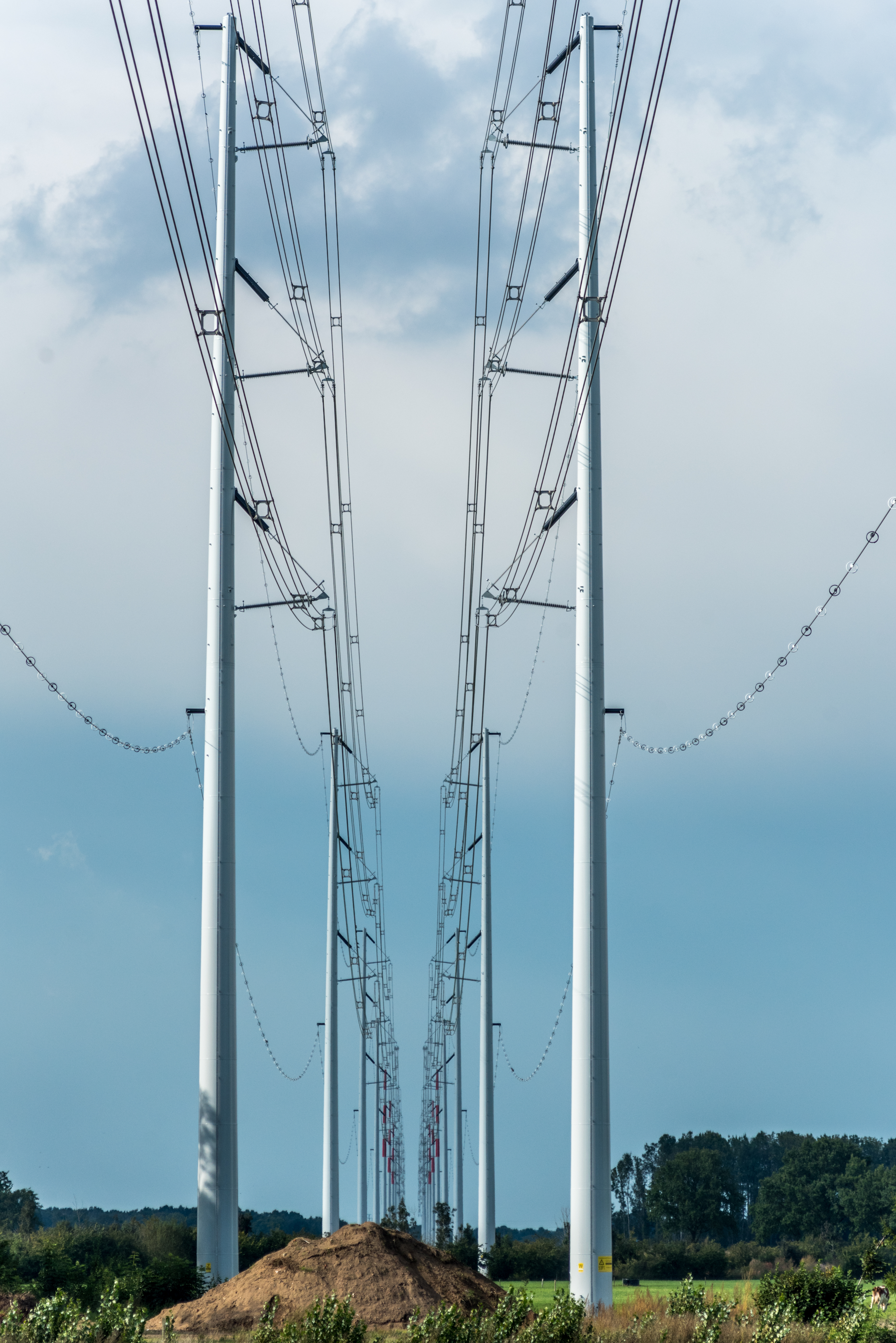
Wintrack Pylons in the Netherlands

Two well-known wide river crossings are the Elbe Crossing 1 and Elbe Crossing 2. The latter has the tallest overhead line masts in Europe, at 227 m (745 ft) tall. In Spain, the overhead line crossing pylons in the Spanish bay of Cádiz have a particularly interesting construction. The main crossing towers are 158 m (518 ft) tall with one crossarm atop a frustum framework construction. The longest overhead line spans are the crossing of the Norwegian Sognefjord Span (4,597 m (15,082 ft) between two masts) and the Ameralik Span in Greenland (5,376 m (17,638 ft)). In Germany, the overhead line of the EnBW AG crossing of the Eyachtal has the longest span in the country at 1,444 m (4,738 ft).

In order to drop overhead lines into steep, deep valleys, inclined towers are occasionally used. These are utilized at the Hoover Dam, located in the United States, to descend the cliff walls of the Black Canyon of the Colorado. In Switzerland, a pylon inclined around 20 degrees to the vertical is located near Sargans, St. Gallens. Highly sloping masts are used on two 380 kV pylons in Switzerland, the top 32 meters of one of them being bent by 18 degrees to the vertical.

Power station chimneys are sometimes equipped with crossbars for fixing conductors of the outgoing lines. Because of possible problems with corrosion by flue gases, such constructions are very rare.

However, there are also roof-mounted support structures for high-voltage. Some thermal power plants in Poland like Połaniec Power Station and in the former Soviet Union like Lukoml Power Station use portal pylons on the roof of the power station building for the high voltage line from the machine transformer to the switchyard. Also other industrial buildings may have a rooftop powerline support structure.

Beside this, it is also possible that the lower parts of an electricity pylon stand in a building. A structure of this type is Tower 9108 of a 110 kV high-voltage traction power line in Fulda.

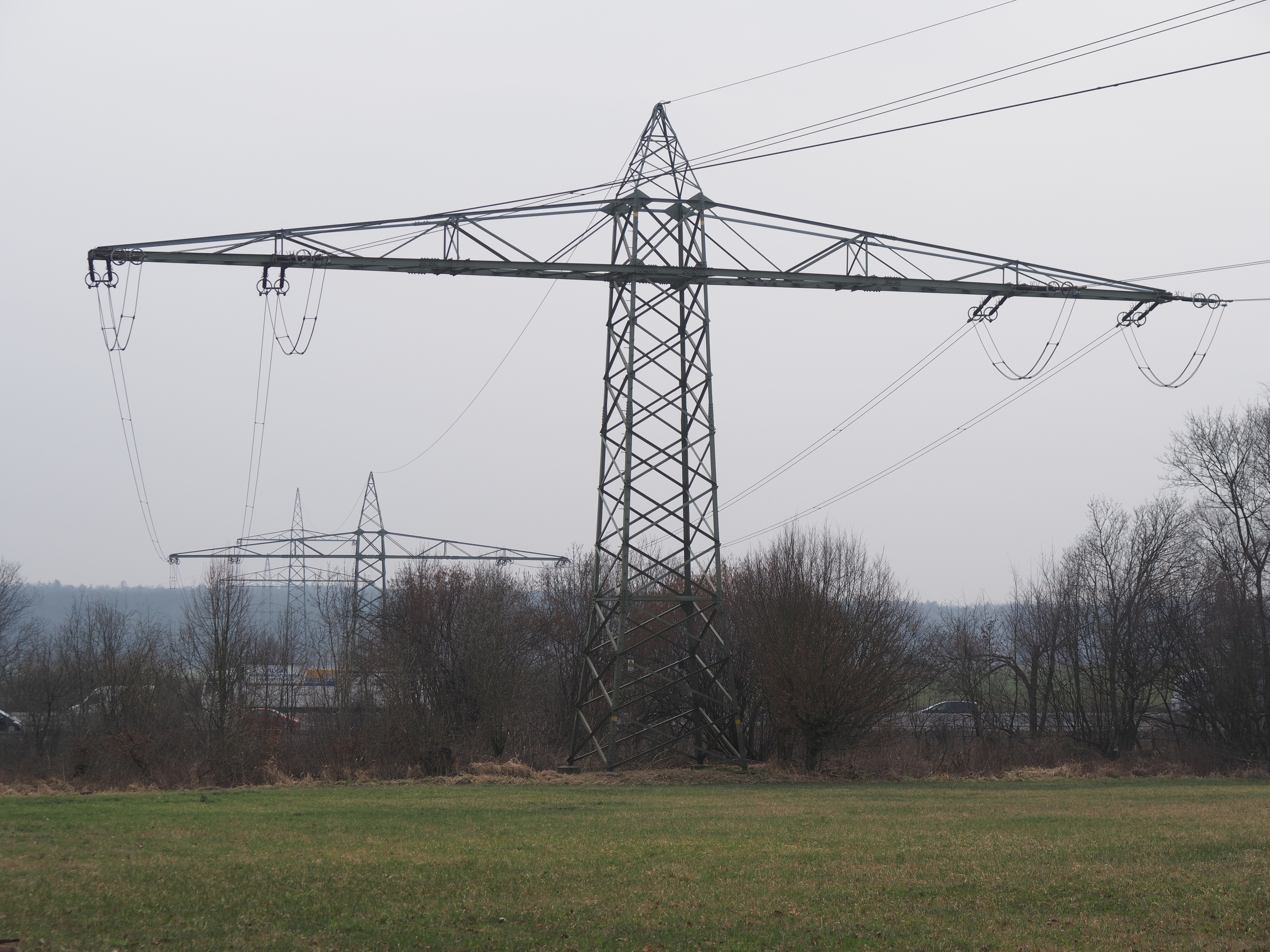
The wide pylon on the North South Line in Germany

== Assembly ==
Before transmission towers are even erected, prototype towers are tested at tower testing stations. There are a variety of ways they can then be assembled and erected:

- They can be assembled horizontally on the ground and erected by push-pull cable. This method is rarely used because of the large assembly area needed.
- They can be assembled vertically (in their final upright position). Very tall towers, such as the Yangtze River Crossing, were assembled in this way.
- A jin-pole crane can be used to assemble lattice towers. This is also used for utility poles.
- Helicopters can serve as aerial cranes for their assembly in areas with limited accessibility. Towers can also be assembled elsewhere and flown to their place on the transmission right-of-way. Helicopters may also be used for transporting disassembled towers for scrapping.

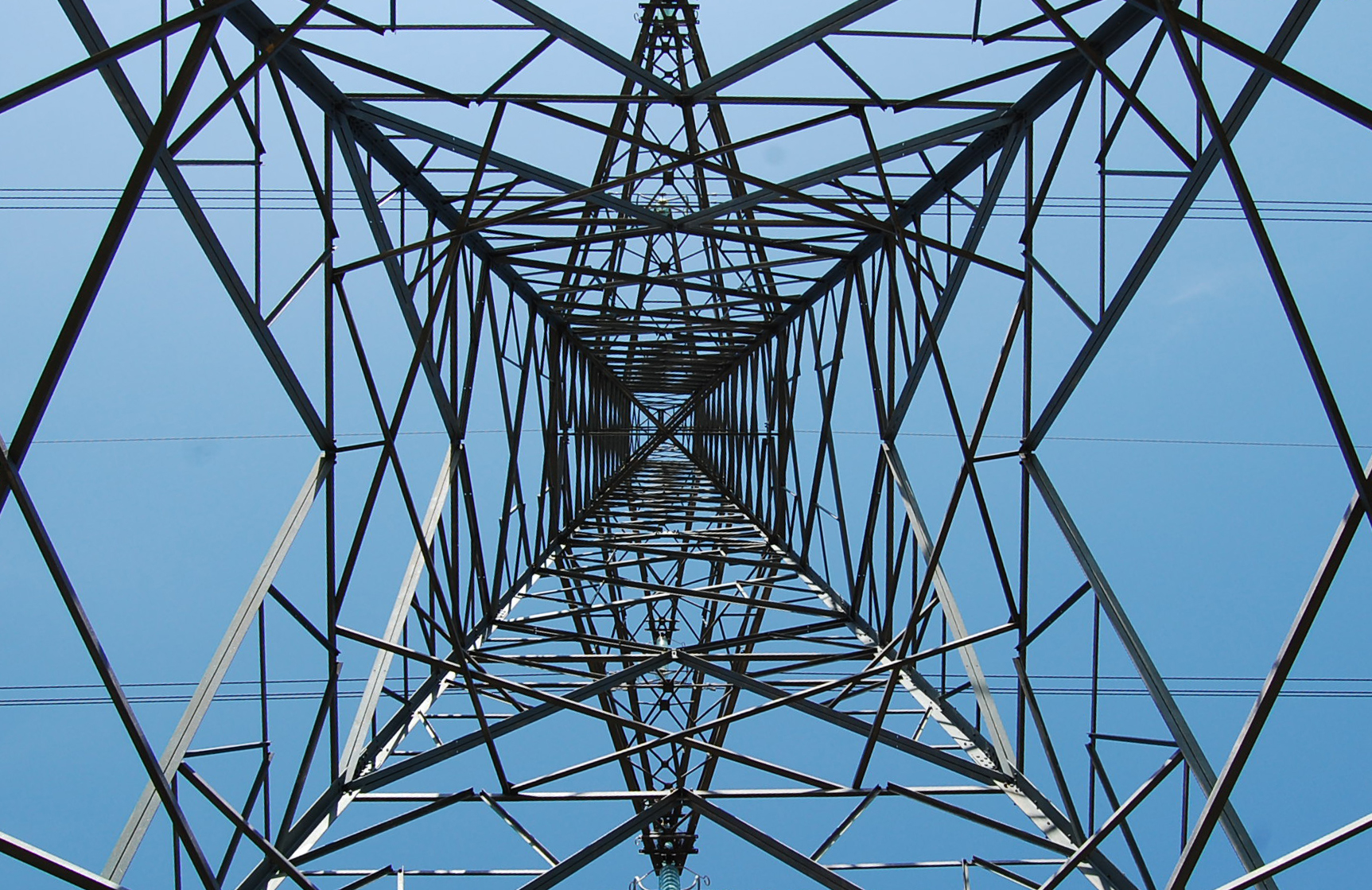
Ground View of a Transmission Tower

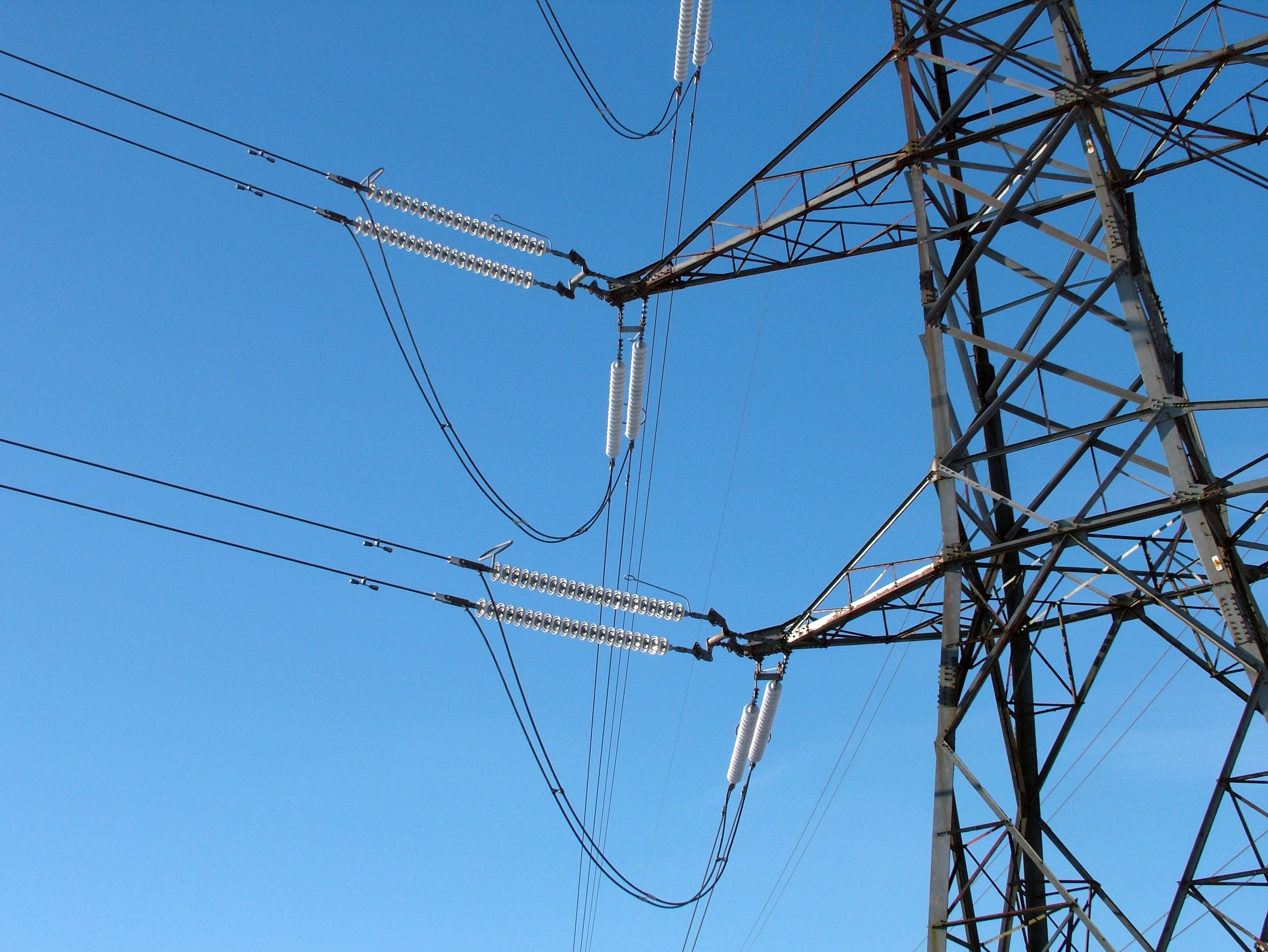
Details of the tower

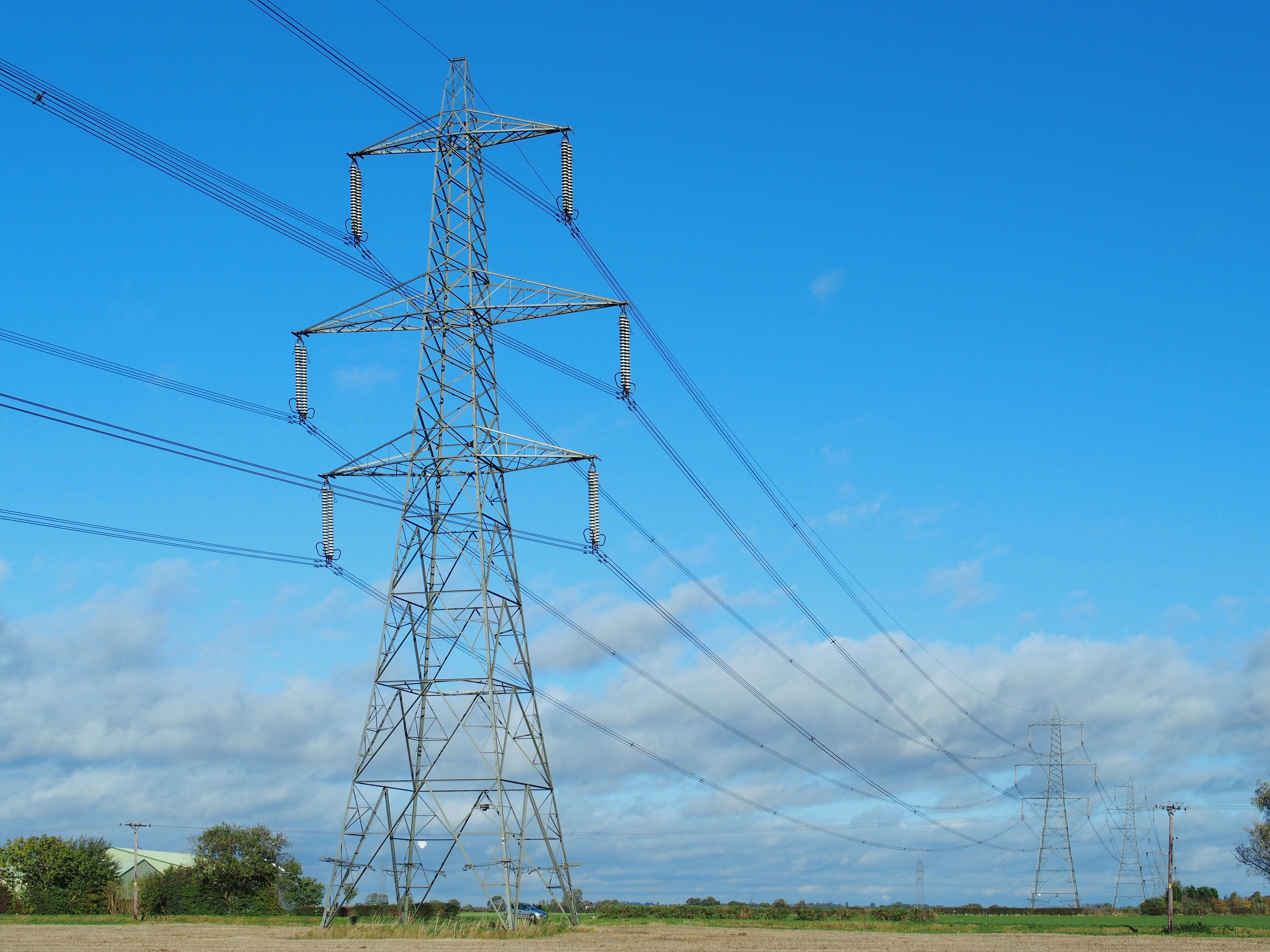
The Barrel Pylon, A British Transmission tower in the UK

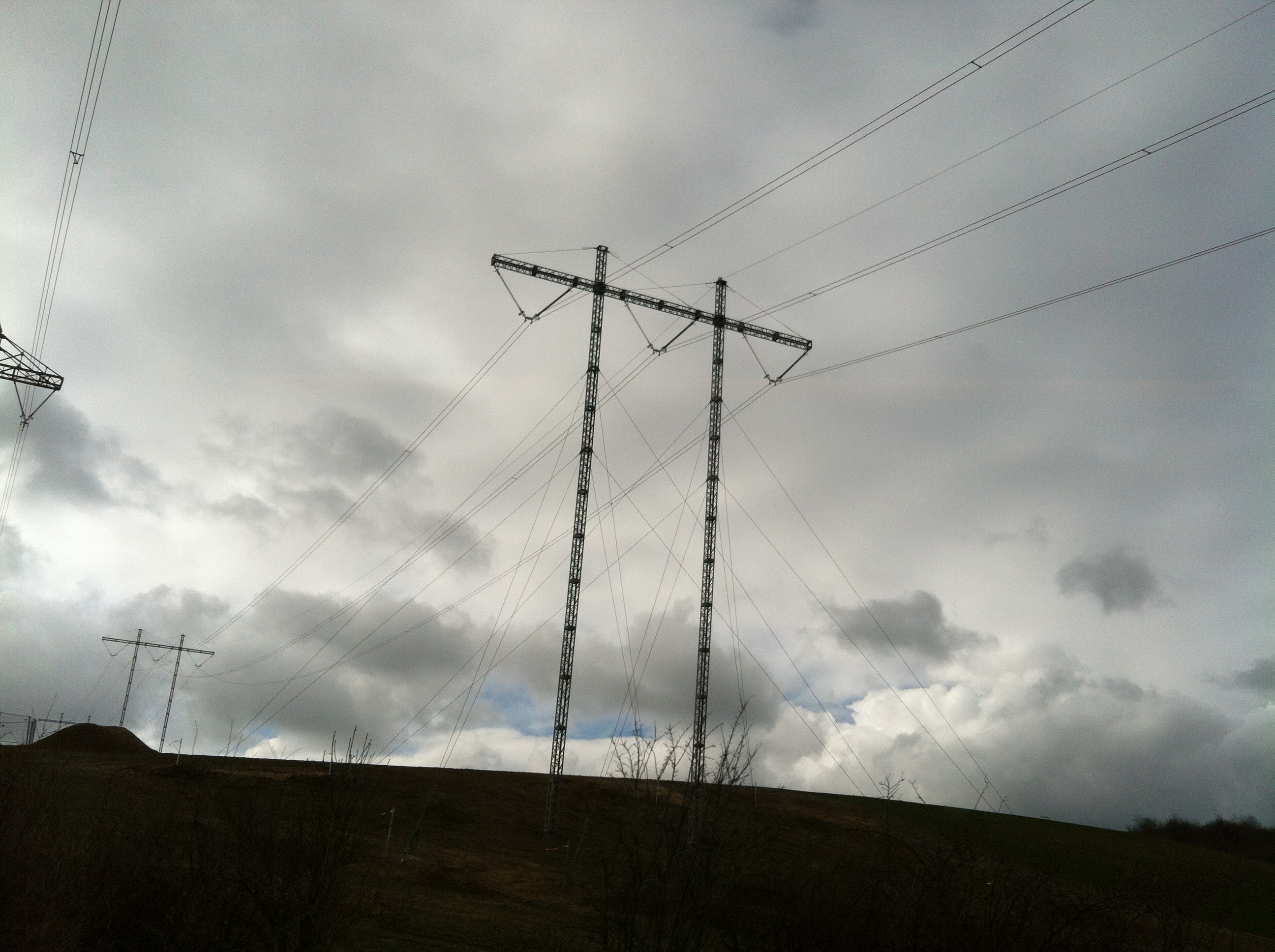
A Portal Pylon

== Markers ==
The International Civil Aviation Organization issues recommendations on markers for towers and the conductors suspended between them. Certain jurisdictions will make these recommendations mandatory, for example that certain power lines must have overhead wire markers placed at intervals, and that warning lights be placed on any sufficiently high towers, this is particularly true of transmission towers which are in close vicinity to airports.

Electricity pylons often have an identification tag marked with the name of the line (either the terminal points of the line or the internal designation of the power company) and the tower number. This makes identifying the location of a fault to the power company that owns the tower easier.

Transmission towers, much like other steel lattice towers including broadcasting or cellphone towers, are marked with signs that discourage public access due to the danger of the high voltage. Often this is accomplished with a sign warning of the high voltage. At other times, the entire access point to the transmission corridor is marked with a sign. Signs warning of the high voltage may also state the name of the company that built the structures and acquired and designated lands where the transmission structures stand and line segments or right of way.

== Tower functions ==
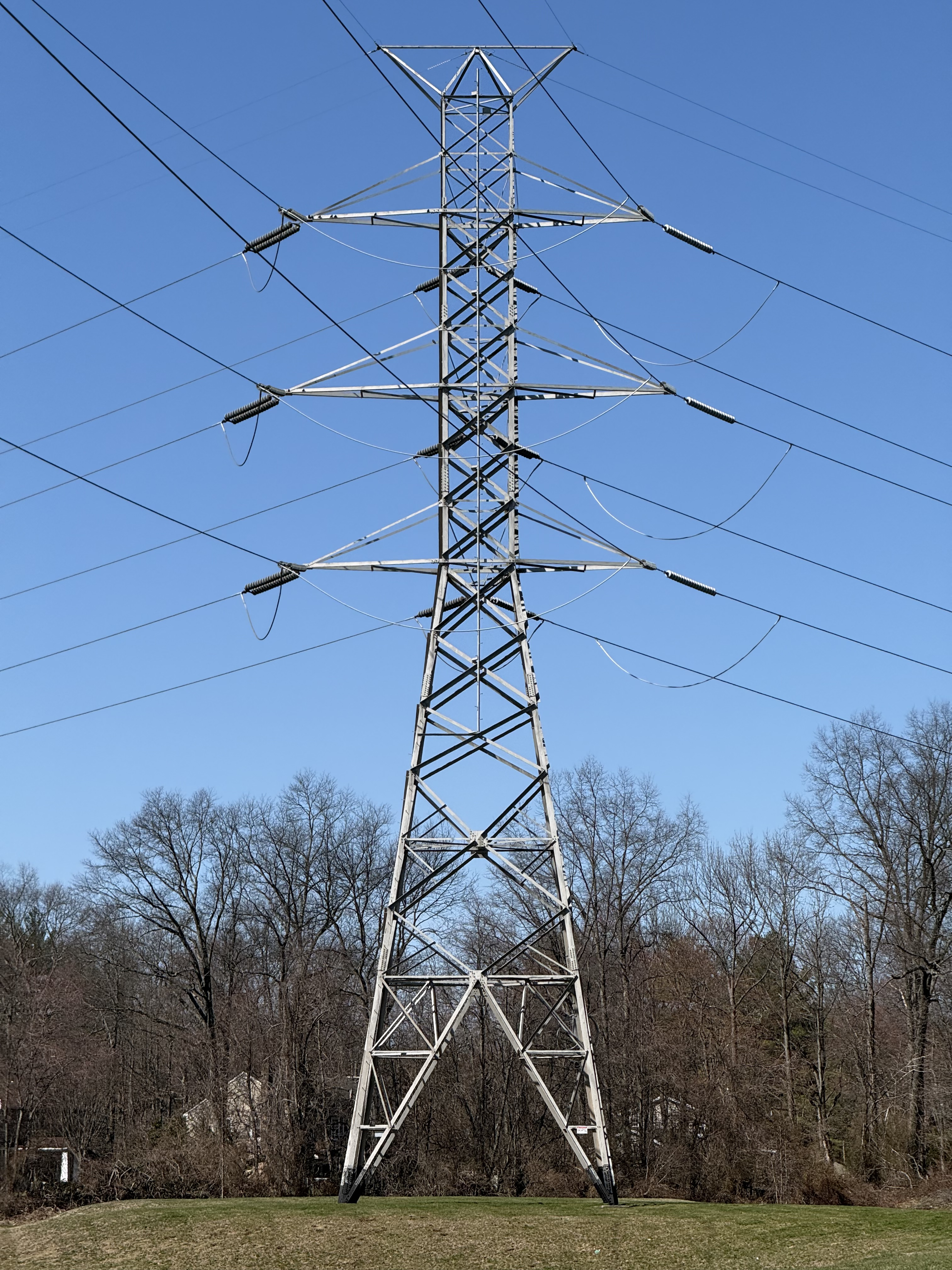
A line junction tower in New Jersey

Tower structures can be classified by the way in which they support the line conductors. Suspension structures support the conductor vertically using suspension insulators. Strain structures resist net tension in the conductors and the conductors attach to the structure through strain insulators. Dead-end structures support the full weight of the conductor and also all the tension in it, and also use strain insulators.

Structures are classified as tangent suspension, angle suspension, tangent strain, angle strain, tangent dead-end and angle dead-end. Where the conductors are in a straight line, a tangent tower is used. Angle towers are used where a line must change direction.

=== Cross arms and conductor arrangement ===
Generally three conductors are required per AC 3-phase circuit, although single-phase and DC circuits are also carried on towers. Conductors may be arranged in one plane, or by use of several cross-arms may be arranged in a roughly symmetrical, triangulated pattern to balance the impedances of all three phases. If more than one circuit is required to be carried and the width of the line right-of-way does not permit multiple towers to be used, two or three circuits can be carried on the same tower using several levels of cross-arms. Often multiple circuits are the same voltage, but mixed voltages can be found on some structures.

== Other features ==
=== Insulators ===
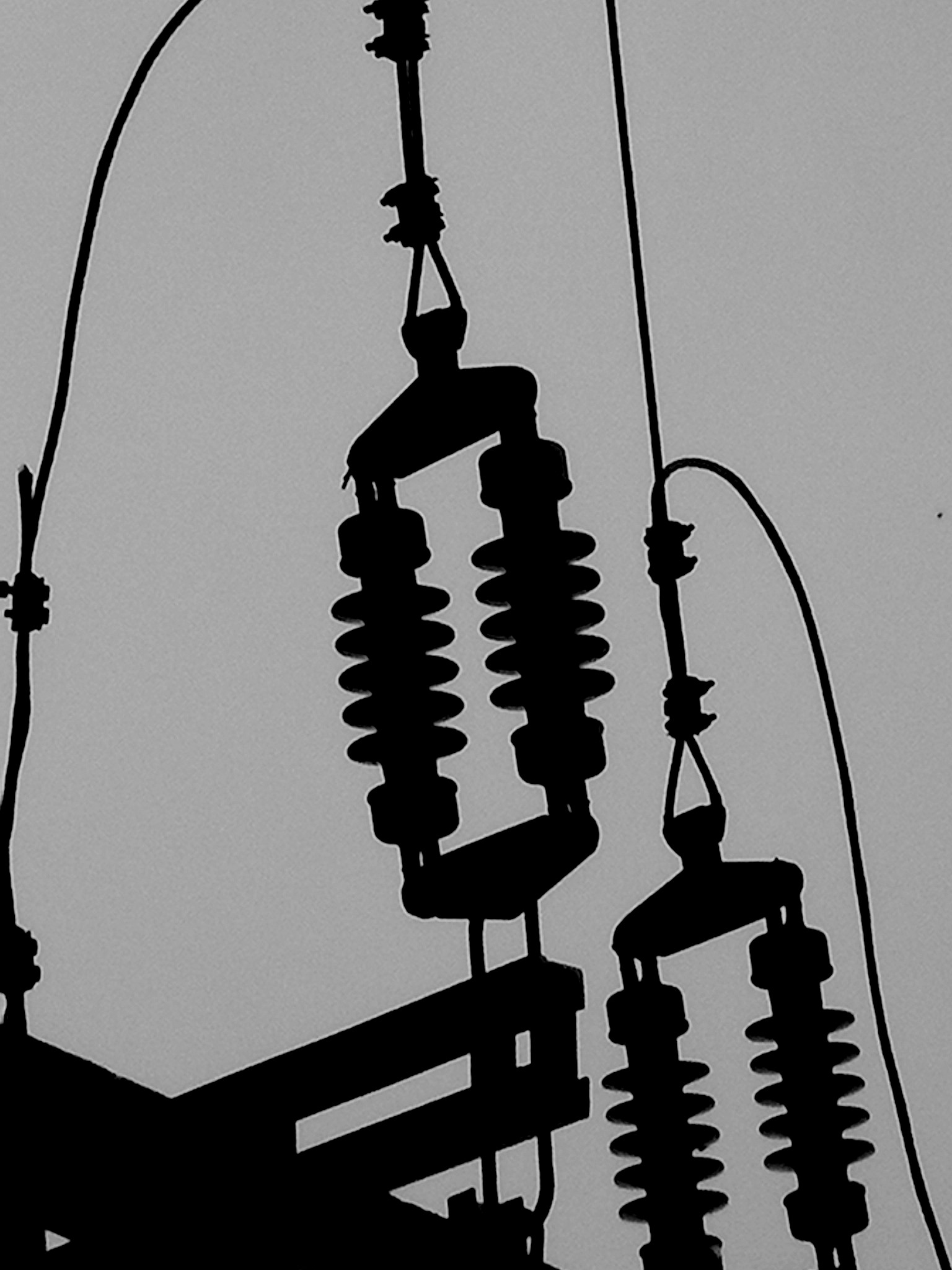
High Insulators are used to gain electricity

Insulators electrically isolate the live side of the transmission cables from the tower structure and earth. They are either glass or porcelain discs or composite insulators using silicone rubber or EPDM rubber material. They are assembled in strings or long rods whose lengths are dependent on the line voltage and environmental conditions. By using disks, the shortest surface electrical path between the ends is maximised, which reduces the chance of a leakage in moist conditions.

=== Stockbridge dampers ===
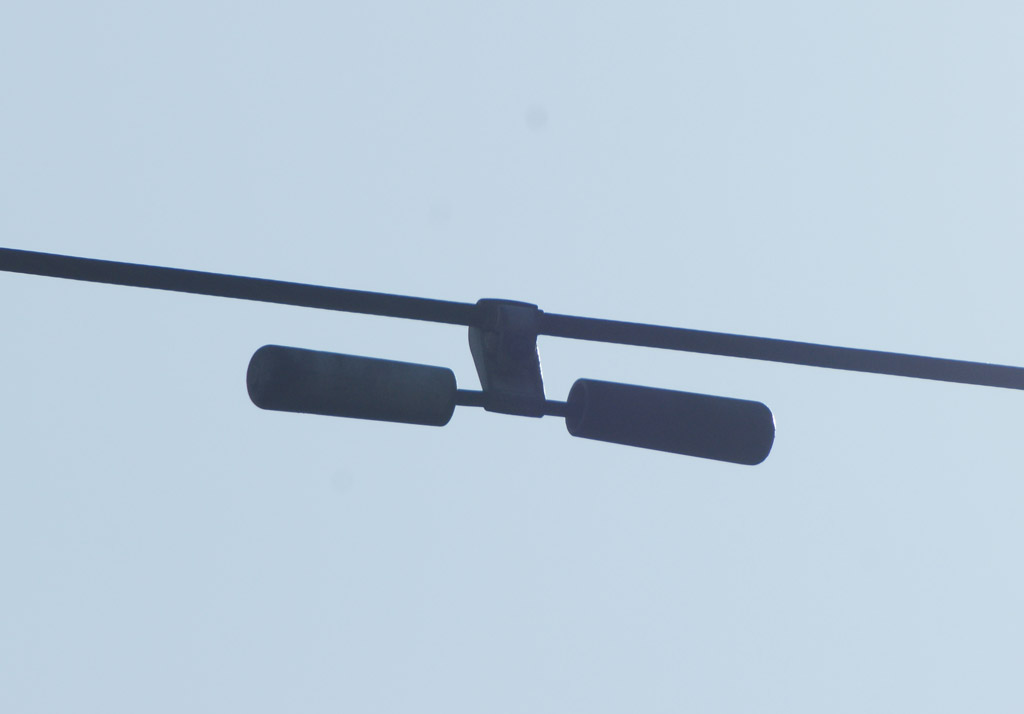
Stockbridge damper bolted to line close to the point of attachment to the tower. It prevents mechanical vibration building up in the line from the wind

Stockbridge dampers are added to the transmission lines a meter or two from the tower. They consist of a short length of cable clamped in place parallel to the line itself and weighted at each end. The size and dimensions are carefully designed to damp any buildup of mechanical oscillation of the lines that could be induced by mechanical vibrations most likely caused by wind. Without them, it is possible for a standing wave to become established that grows in magnitude and destroys the line or the tower.

=== Arcing horns ===
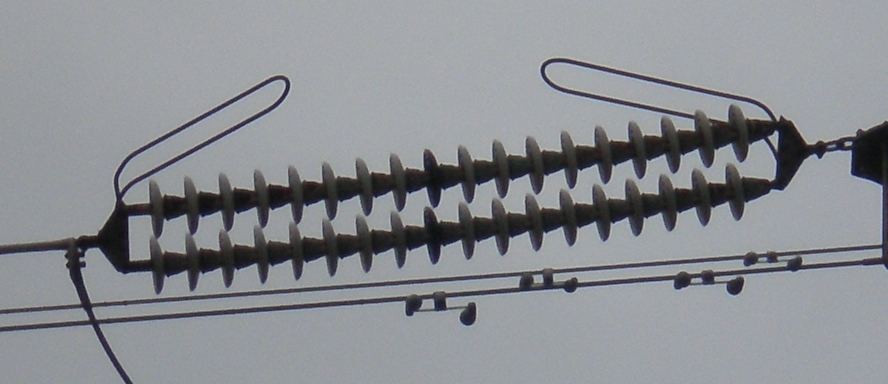
Arcing horns

Arcing horns are sometimes added to the ends of the insulators in areas where voltage surges may occur. These may be caused by either lightning strikes or in switching operations. They protect power line insulators from damage due to arcing. They can be seen as rounded metal pipework at either end of the insulator and provide a path to earth in extreme circumstances without damaging the insulator.

=== Physical security ===
Towers have a level of physical security to prevent members of the public or climbing animals from ascending them. This may take the form of a security fence or climbing baffles added to the supporting legs. Some countries require that lattice steel towers be equipped with a barbed wire barrier approximately 3 m (9.8 ft) above ground in order to deter unauthorized climbing. Such barriers can often be found on towers close to roads or other areas with easy public access, even where there is not a legal requirement. In the United Kingdom, all such towers are fitted with barbed wire.

=== Conductor bundles ===
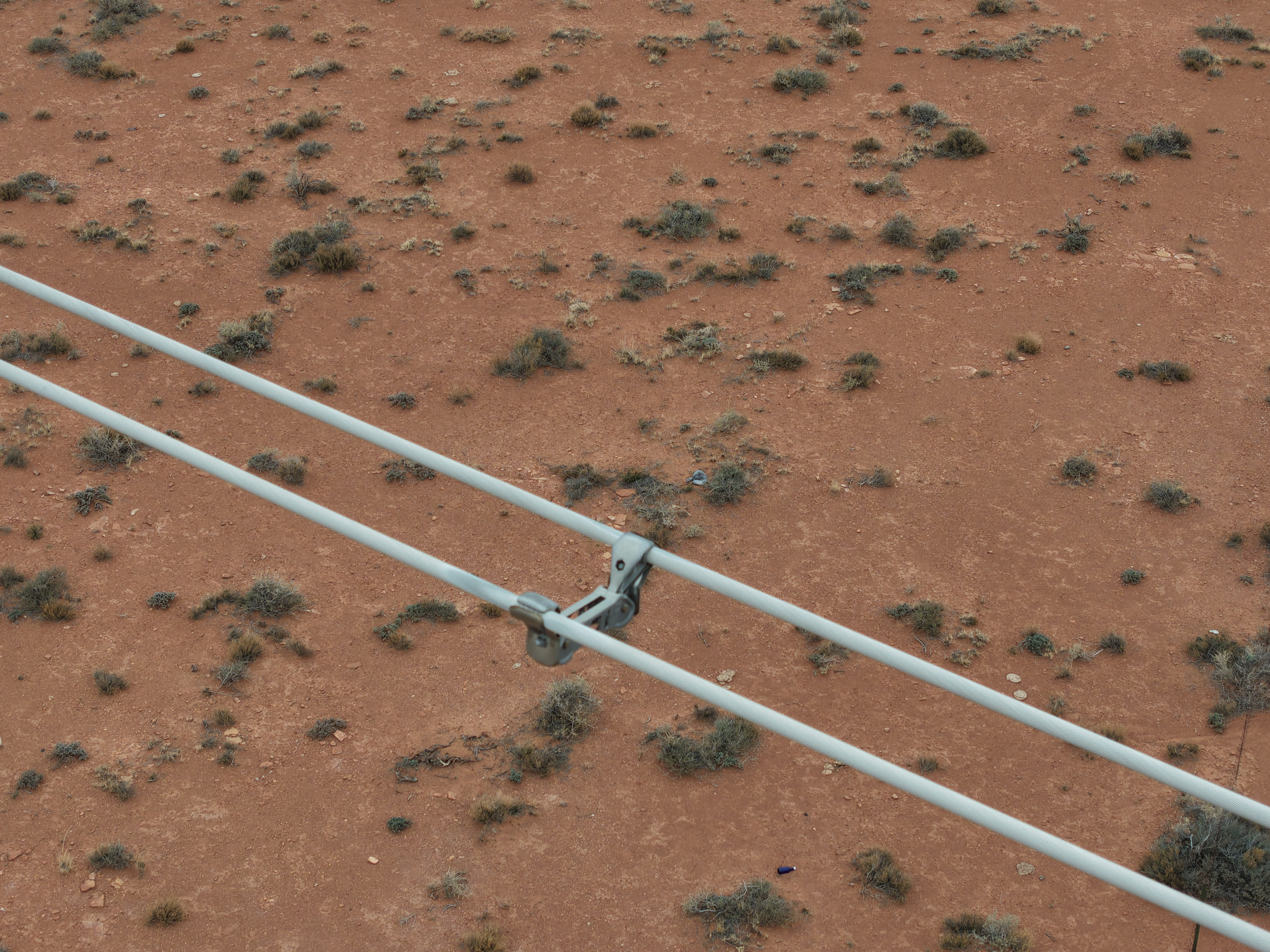
Twin conductor bundle on a 500kV power line

In cases where the line capacity exceeds the ability for one wire to sufficiently carry the current, multiple conductors can be "bundled" together. This provides several benefits for the line. Bundling conductors increases the effective radius of the phase wire, decreasing the lines inductance and increasing its capacitance. This boosts the transmission line's overall power transfer capacity. Bundling multiple conductors also improve the lines performance by preventing corona discharge and associated losses. Bundles can come in common numbers with up to 6 or 8 conductors on ultra-high voltage lines.

=== Other features ===
Some electricity pylons, especially for voltages above 100 kV, carry transmission antennas. In most cases these are cellphone antennas and antennas for radio relay links adjoined with them, but it is also possible that antennas of radio relay systems of power companies or antenna for small broadcasting transmitters in the VHF-/UHF-range are installed. The northern tower of Elbekreuzung 1 carries at a height of 30 metres a radar station for monitoring ship traffic on the Elbe river on its structure. The Tower 93 of Facility 4101, a strainer at Hürth south of Cologne, Germany carried from 1977 to 2010 a public observation deck, which was accessible by a staircase.

== Notable electricity transmission towers ==
The following electricity transmission towers are notable due to their enormous height, unusual design, unusual construction site or their use in artworks. Bold type denotes structure which was at one time the tallest transmission tower(s) in the world.

Tower	Year	Country	Town	Pinnacle	Remarks
Bog Fox	2020	Estonia	Risti	45	Design pylon
Clown-shaped pylons	?	Hungary	Újhartyán	-	-
Goal-post shaped towers	?	USA	Cantion, Ohio	-	
The Mickey Pylon	?	USA	Orlando, Florida	-	Mickey Mouse shaped transmission tower on the side of Interstate 4, near Walt Disney World
Jintang-Cezi Overhead Powerline Link	2018–2019	China	Jintang Island	**380 m**	2656 metres long span between Jintang and Cezi island
Zhoushan Island Overhead Powerline Tie	2009–2010	China	Damao Island	**370 m**	Built by State Grid
Jiangyin Yangtze River Crossing	2003	China	Jiangyin	**346.5 m**	
Amazonas Crossing of Tucuruí transmission line	2013	Brazil	near Almeirim	295 m	Tallest electricity pylons in South America
Yangtze River power line crossing of Shanghai-Huainan Powerline	2013	China	Gaogouzhen	269.75 m	
Nanjing Yangtze River Crossing	1992	China	Nanjing	**257 m**	Tallest reinforced concrete pylons in the world
Pylons of Pearl River Crossing	1987	China	Pearl River	253 m + 240 m	
Orinoco River Crossing	1990	Venezuela	Caroní	240 m	
Hooghly River Crossing		India	Diamond Harbour	236 m	
Pylons of Messina	1957	Italy	Messina	232 m (**224 m** without basement)	Not used as pylons any more
HVDC Yangtze River Crossing Wuhu	2003	China	Wuhu	229 m	Tallest electricity pylons used for HVDC
Elbe Crossing 2	1976–1978	Germany	Stade	**227 m**	Tallest electricity pylons still in use in Europe
Chushi Powerline Crossing	1962	Japan	Takehara	**226 m**	Tallest electricity pylons in Japan
Daqi Channel Crossing	1997	Japan	Takehara	223 m	
Overhead line crossing Suez Canal	1998	Egypt		221 m	
Huainan Luohe Powerline Crossing	1989	China	Huainan	202.5 m	Pylons of reinforced concrete
Yangzi River Crossing of HVDC Xianjiaba – Shanghai	2009	China	???	202 m	
Balakovo 500 kV Wolga Crossing, Tower East	1983–1984	Russia	Balakovo	197 m	Tallest electricity pylon in Russia and ex-USSR
LingBei Channel Crossing	1993	Japan	Reihoku	195 m	
Doel Schelde Powerline Crossing 2	2019	Belgium	Antwerp	192 m	Second crossing of Schelde River
400 kV Thames Crossing	1965	UK	West Thurrock	190 m	
Elbe Crossing 1	1958–1962	Germany	Stade	189 m	
Antwerp Deurganck dok crossing	2000	Belgium	Antwerp	178 m	Crossing of a container quay
Tracy Saint Lawrence River Powerline Crossing	?	Canada	Tracy	176 m	Tallest electricity pylon in Canada
Línea de Transmisión Carapongo – Carabayllo	2011	Peru	Lima	170.5 m	Crossing of Rimac River in a 1055 metres long span
Doel Schelde Powerline Crossing 1	1974	Belgium	Antwerp	170 m	Group of 2 towers with 1 pylon situated in the middle of Schelde River
Sunshine Mississippi Powerline Crossing	1967	United States	St. Gabriel, Louisiana	164.6 m	Tallest electricity pylons in the United States
Lekkerkerk Crossing 1	1970	Netherlands	Lekkerkerk	163 m	Tallest crossing in the Netherlands
Bosporus overhead line crossing III	1999	Turkey	Istanbul	160 m	
Balakovo 500 kV Wolga Crossing, Tower West	1983–1984	Russia	Balakovo	159 m	
Pylons of Cadiz	1957–1960	Spain	Cadiz	158 m	
Maracaibo Bay Powerline Crossing	?	Venezuela	Maracaibo	150 m	Towers on caissons
Meredosia-Ipava Illinois River Crossing	2017	United States	Beardstown	149.35 m	
Aust Severn Powerline Crossing	1959	UK	Aust	148.75 m	
132 kV Thames Crossing	1932	UK	West Thurrock	**148.4 m**	Demolished in 1987
Karmsundet Powerline Crossing	?	Norway	Karmsundet	143.5 m	
Limfjorden Overhead powerline crossing 2	?	Denmark	Raerup	141.7 m	
Saint Lawrence River HVDC Quebec-New England Overhead Powerline Crossing	1989	Canada	Deschambault-Grondines	140 m	Dismantled in 1992
Pylons of Voerde	1926	Germany	Voerde	**138 m**	
Köhlbrand Powerline Crossing	?	Germany	Hamburg	138 m	
Bremen-Farge Weser Powerline Crossing	?	Germany	Bremen	135 m	
Pylons of Ghesm Crossing	1984	Iran	Strait of Ghesm	130 m	One pylon standing on a caisson in the sea
Shukhov tower on the Oka River	1929	Russia	Dzerzhinsk	128 m	Hyperboloid structure, 2 towers, one of them demolished
Tarchomin pylon of Tarchomin-Łomianki Vistula Powerline Crossing	?	Poland	Tarchomin	127 m	
Skolwin pylon of Skolwin-Inoujscie Odra Powerline Crossing	?	Poland	Skolwin	126 m	
Enerhodar Dnipro Powerline Crossing 2	1977	Ukraine	Enerhodar	126 m	
Inoujscie pylon of Skolwin-Inoujscie Odra Powerline Crossing	?	Poland	Inoujscie	125 m	
Bosporus overhead line crossing II	1983	Turkey	Istanbul	124 m	
Tista River Crossing	1985	India	Jalpaiguri	120 m	Pile foundation
Duisburg-Wanheim Powerline Rhine Crossing	?	Germany	Duisburg	122 m	
Łomianki pylon of Tarchomin-Łomianki Vistula Powerline Crossing	?	Poland	Łomianki	121 m	
Little Belt Overhead powerline crossing 2	?	Denmark	Middelfart	125.3 m / 119.2 m	
Little Belt Overhead powerline crossing 2	?	Denmark	Middelfart	119.5 m / 113.1 m	
Pylons of Duisburg-Rheinhausen	1926	Germany	Duisburg-Rheinhausen	118.8 m	
Bullenhausen Elbe Powerline Crossing	?	Germany	Bullenhausen	117 m	
Lubaniew-Bobrowniki Vistula Powerline Crossing	?	Poland	Lubaniew/Bobrowniki	117 m	
Świerże Górne-Rybaków Vistula Powerline Crossing	?	Poland	Świerże Górne/Rybaków	116 m	
Ostrówek-Tursko Vistula Powerline Crossing	?	Poland	Ostrówek/Tursko	115 m	
Bosporus overhead line crossing I	1957	Turkey	Istanbul	113 m	
Riga Hydroelectric Power Plant Crossing Pylon	1974	Latvia	Salaspils	112 m	
Bremen-Industriehafen Weser Powerline Crossing	?	Germany	Bremen	111 m	Two parallel running powerlines, one used for a single phase AC powerline of Deutsche Bahn AG
Probostwo Dolne pylon of Nowy Bógpomóz-Probostwo Dolne Vistula Powerline Crossing	?	Poland	Nowy Bógpomóz/Probostwo Dolne	111 m	
Ameren UE Tower	2009	United States	St. Louis, Missouri	111 m	Radio tower with crossbars for powerline conductors
Daugava Powerline Crossing	1975	Latvia	Riga	110 m	
380 kV Ems Overhead Powerline Crossing	?	Germany	Mark (south of Weener)	110 m	
Nowy Bógpomóz pylon of Nowy Bógpomóz-Probostwo Dolne Vistula Powerline Crossing	?	Poland	Nowy Bógpomóz	109 m	
Regów Golab Vistula Powerline Crossing	?	Poland	Regów/Golab	108 m	
Orsoy Rhine Crossing	?	Germany	Orsoy	105 m	
Kerinchi Pylon	1999	Malaysia	Kerinchi	103 m	Tallest strainer pylon in the world, not part of a powerline crossing of a waterway
Limfjorden Overhead powerline crossing 1	?	Denmark	Raerup	101.2 m	
Enerhodar Dnipro Powerline Crossing 2	1977	Ukraine	Enerhodar	100 m	Pylons standing on caissons
Reisholz Rhine Powerline Crossing	1917	Germany	Düsseldorf	?	Under the legs of the pylon on the east shore of Rhine there runs the rail to nearby Holthausen substation
Sone River Crossing	1983	India	Sone Bhadra (Uttar Pradesh)	96 m	Pylons standing on well foundation
Ghazi pond crossing Tarbela Dam	2017	Pakistan	Tarbela Dam	89.5m	SPT type tower. First of its type in Pakistan.
Al Batinah expressway road & rail crossing at Sohar 220 kV Double circuit OETC line	2018	Oman	Sohar	89 m	Tallest transmission line tower in Sultanate of Oman
Strelasund Powerline Crossing	?	Germany	Sundhagen	85 m	Pylons standing on caissons
Pylon in the artificial lake of Santa Maria	1959	Switzerland	Lake of Santa Maria	75 m	Pylon in an artificial lake
Facility 4101, Tower 93	1975	Germany	Hürth	74.84 m	Carried until 2010 an observation deck
Zaporizhzhia Pylon Triple	?	Ukraine	Zaporizhzhia	74.5 m	Two triple pylons used for a powerline crossing from Khortytsia Island to the east shore of Dneipr
Aggersund Crossing of Cross-Skagerrak	1977	Denmark	Aggersund	70 m	Tallest pylons used for HVDC-transmission in Europe
Eyachtal Span	1992	Germany	Höfen	70 m	Longest span of Germany (1444 metres)
Leaning pylon of Mingjian	?	Taiwan	Mingjian	?	Earthquake memorial
Carquinez Strait Powerline Crossing	1901	United States	Benicia	**68 m** + 20 m	World's first powerline crossing of a larger waterway
Tower 1 of Powerline Reuter-West - Reuter	1987	Germany	Berlin	61.3 m	Chimney-like strainer, however not useable as smokestack, design was chosen in order to fit better into the surrounding industrial area
Pylon 310 of powerline Innertkirchen-Littau-Mettlen	1990	Switzerland	Littau	59.5 m	Tallest pylon of prefabricated concrete
Huddersfield Narrow Canal Pylon	1967	UK	Stalybridge, Greater Manchester	54.6 m	Pylon standing over a waterway shipable by small boats
Anlage 7610, Mast 74	1980	Germany	Wittighausen	51.2 m	Pylon standing over a paved way
Anlage 2610, Mast 69	?	Germany	Bochum	47 m	Pylon of 220 kV powerline decorated with balls in Ruhr-Park mall
Colossus of Eislingen	1980	Germany	Eislingen/Fils	47 m	Pylon standing over a small river
Pylon 24 of powerline Watari-Kashiwabara	?	Japan	Uchihara, Ibaraki	45 m	Pylon standing over a public road with two lanes
Designer high-voltage pylon Bog Fox	2020	Estonia	Risti, Lääne County	45 m	The first high-voltage designer pylon in Estonia
Sookurg	2022	Estonia	Tartu-Tiksoja, Tähtvere County	44 m	Designer pylon
Sookureke	2023	Estonia	Jõhvi–Tartu–Valga, Mustvee County	40 m	Designer pylon
Mickey Pylon	1996	US	Celebration, Florida	32 m	Mickey Mouse shaped pylon
Source	2004	France	Amnéville les Thermes	34 m / 28 m	4 pylons forming an artwork
Tower 9108	1983	Germany	Fulda	20.4 m	Base situated in a storage building, looks like roof-mounted
Western Tower of Overhead Line of Ostrich Lake Ferry	1915	Germany	Strausberg	9.7 m	Carries together with its counterpart on the other bank of Ostrich Lake the longest span (length: 370 metres) of an overhead wire for feeding electric power to a vehicle
Eastern Tower of Overhead Line of Ostrich Lake Ferry	2006	Germany	Strausberg	9.6 m	Carries together with its counterpart on the other bank of Ostrich Lake the longest span (length: 370 metres) of an overhead wire for feeding electric power to a vehicle
Birds Landing Overhead Lattice Transmission Towers	2025	USA	Rio Vista, California	172m	Part of 230kV high voltage transmission line, Towers span 4000 ft across Sacramento River. These are the tallest lattice transmission Towers in North America.

== See also ==
- Architectural engineering
- List of high voltage underground and submarine cables
- List of spans
- Live-line working
- Stobie pole
- Structural engineering
- Traction current pylon
- Utility pole
