= Bombardier Transportation =

Former Canadian rolling stock and rail transport manufacturer

- Type: Division
- Industry: Manufacturing
- Founded: 1974; 52 years ago
- Defunct: 29 January 2021; 5 years ago
- Fate: Acquired by Alstom
- Headquarters: NA: Toronto, Canada; EU: Berlin, Germany
- Area served: Worldwide
- Products: Locomotives; Passenger railroad cars; Trams; People movers; Signalling systems
- Revenue: US$12.2 billion (2025)
- Number of employees: 36,029 employees (2025)
- Parent: Bombardier Inc.

Bombardier Transportation was a Canadian rolling stock and rail transport manufacturer, with headquarters in Toronto and Berlin. It was one of the world's largest companies in the rail vehicle and equipment manufacturing and servicing industry, prior to being acquired by Alstom in 2021. Bombardier Transportation had many regional offices, production and development facilities worldwide. It produced a wide range of products including passenger rail vehicles, locomotives, bogies, propulsion and controls. In February 2020, the company had 36,000 employees, and 63 manufacturing and engineering locations around the world. Formerly a division of Bombardier Inc., the company was acquired by French manufacturer Alstom on 29 January 2021.

== History ==
=== 20th century ===
==== 1970s: Formation and first orders ====
Canadian company Bombardier Inc. entered the rail market in 1970 when it purchased Lohner-Rotax of Austria. While Lohner built trams, Bombardier was more interested in its Rotax business, which built engines for its Ski-Doo snowmobiles. But Bombardier held onto the rolling stock business, and in 1974 secured an order from Société de transport de Montréal (STM) to build metro trains for the Montreal Metro. The core of the transportation group was formed when Bombardier purchased the Montreal Locomotive Works (MLW) in 1975. The purchase of MLW gave Bombardier a rail focused manufacturing facility, that had an established history of building locomotives, freight railcars, and passenger railcars.

==== 1980s: Expansion to the US and Europe ====
With the purchase of the MLW, Bombardier acquired the LRC (Light, Rapid, Comfortable) tilting train design which it heavily marketed to both Amtrak and Canada's Via Rail, however, the program was only modestly successful with Bombardier selling about 100 LRC coaches to Via. In 1987, Bombardier bought the assets of two major US railcar manufacturers, Budd and Pullman-Standard. With these new assets, and no desire to remain in the business of building freight locomotives or freight cars, Bombardier sold off MLW to General Electric in 1988.

In the late 1980s Bombardier Transportation gained a manufacturing presence in Europe with the acquisition of a 45% share in BN Constructions Ferroviaires et Métalliques (whose principal facility was in Bruges, Belgium) in 1986. This was followed by the acquisition of the second-largest French railway manufacturer ANF Industrie with its main plant in Crespin in 1989. Bombardier Transportation had become by that time the leading North American producer of rail equipment which had sold 825 subway cars to New York City in the 1970s and 1980s.

==== 1990s: Expansion to Mexico, Germany and the UK ====
Back home in Canada, 1991 brought a big expansion for Bombardier. The company was able to acquire the Urban Transportation Development Corporation (UTDC) from the Government of Ontario after its parent company Lavalin went bankrupt. In addition to the core UTDC assets, Bombardier also received the rail manufacturing division of Hawker Siddeley Canada which had been purchased by Lavalin and merged into UTDC. The Hawker Siddeley assets included a manufacturing plant in Thunder Bay, Ontario.

That same year in Europe, the company established its Bombardier Eurorail division consisting of ANF, BN, BWS (the former assets of Lohner), and the English bodyshell maker Prorail, which it had purchased in 1990. The company also owned the North-American rights to the French TGV through an agreement with GEC Alsthom. In 1992, the company acquired Mexico's largest railway rolling-stock manufacturer, Concarril, from the Mexican government.

The late 1990s also saw a major expansion in European operations. The company purchased Waggonfabrik Talbot (whose factory was in Aachen, Germany) in 1995 and Deutsche Waggonbau (DW) in 1998, which added factories in Bautzen and Görlitz, Germany along with a plant in Villeneuve, Switzerland which DW had purchased the prior year from Ateliers de Constructions Mécaniques de Vevey.

=== 21st century ===
==== 2000s: Western world's largest rail-equipment manufacturer ====
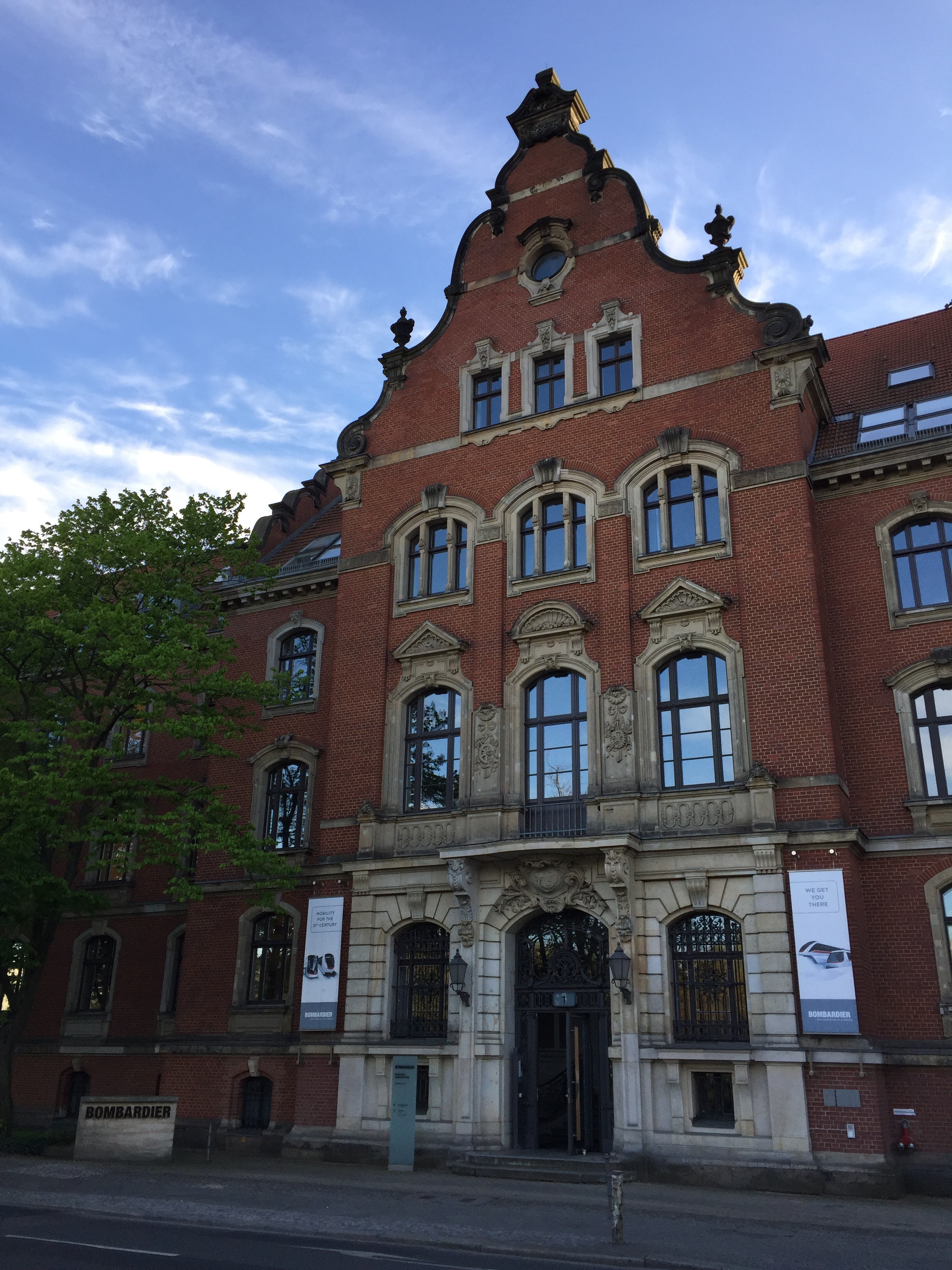
Bombardier's former Berlin headquarters

The company's biggest acquisition came just after the turn of the century when it purchased Adtranz from DaimlerChrysler. Adtranz was a sprawling multi-national company twice the size of Bombardier at the time, which had only become profitable in the months before the merger. The combination would make Bombardier the largest rail-equipment manufacturer.

DaimlerChrysler agreed in August 2000 to sell Adtranz for US$711 million (equivalent to US$1.329 billion in 2025), a price considered to be low by industry analysts. (Note: The price would be subject to the acquired company entering profitability in the following year – if not the sale price would be reduced.) The sale was cleared by the European Union in April 2001 on the condition that Bombardier would license or sell the Adtranz regional train and tram products to Stadler Rail in the German market, due to the large market share of Bombardier and Adtranz in the country. The deal would make Stadler a viable independent company providing competition to Bombardier. The takeover came into legal effect on 1 May 2001, with a final price of US$725 million. After the purchase, Bombardier Transportation moved its head office to Europe, while keeping a few plants in the US and Canada for the smaller North American market.

However, the merger was not smooth. Within weeks Bombardier said that it was misled about the financial situation of Adtranz, and the combination of the two companies took years to resolve. One of the major issues was the sprawling footprint of the two companies in Europe. Even after closing some locations, in the early days after the merger Bombardier planned to operate 27 manufacturing sites across 14 countries. The number of sites meant that some would see the scope of their work decreased.

In 2004, amid overcapacity in the European passenger train industry, Bombardier announced eight sites would close. Later that year in September, DaimlerChrysler agreed to refund Bombardier US$209 million, making the final sale price for Adtranz just $516 million.

==== 2010s: Global operations and decline ====
The transportation division's financial woes continued into the 2010s, reflecting a broader trend within the company. Bombardier's aviation division racked up billions of dollars in debt developing the CSeries airliner and the Global 7000 business jet.

Between 2012 and 2015, the company announced the closure of several plants including the former Waggonfabrik Talbot plant in Germany, and a factory in Australia, and a facility in Hungary was nationalized.

In the same period, Bombardier agreed to several potentially lucrative, but risky contracts to build R179 cars for the New York City Subway, the Fleet of the Future for San Francisco's Bay Area Rapid Transit, Flexity streetcars for Toronto, Aventra EMUs for the London Overground and Twindexx EMUs for Switzerland's SBB. Each of these contracts was valued between $600 million and $1.8 billion, but each called for highly specialized, one-of-kind equipment, and many also included late-delivery penalties. Deliveries of each would be delayed, beset by software issues, and reliability problems once trains were placed in service.

Under increasingly dire financial pressure, Bombardier Inc. announced in May 2015 that it planned to split or spin-off Bombardier Transportation as a separate publicly traded company, while retaining control as the majority owner. The sale would generate money needed to continue the financing of the troubled CSeries jet, and Transportation division managers said the independence would allow them to better compete with a growing Chinese presence in the European market. An IPO was planned for late 2015.

However, before the IPO could be floated, the Caisse de dépôt et placement du Québec (CDPQ) stepped in and agreed to give Bombardier a US$1.5 billion infusion of cash. In exchange CDPQ, a crown corporation which manages pension and insurance plans, would receive a 30% stake in the company. The deal was structured as a bond/equity hybrid, with shares returned to CDPQ dependent on the financial performance of the company.

Over the next few years, Bombardier worked to correct issues with the cars it agreed to build in the earlier half of the decade, and simplify production through more selective bidding, greater standardization and centralized procurement. It also planned to layoff thousands of workers in Germany. However, the penalties the company was hit with for late deliveries wiped out many of the divisions profits. By 2018, Bombardier slipped to become the 3rd largest rail-equipment manufacturer in the Western World and fourth globally, eclipsed by CRRC, Siemens and Alstom.

Between mid-2018 and late-2019, Bombardier started selling off many of its commercial aviation assets, notably selling the CSeries to Airbus. This left the company as a manufacturer of rail vehicles and business jets.

==== 2021: Sale to Alstom ====
In February 2020, Alstom agreed to buy the Bombardier Transportation division and signed a memorandum of understanding to do so, for between €5.8 billion and €6.2 billion. The deal required approval by Alstom shareholders at a meeting held in October 2020, as well as approval by European regulators. Bombardier's major shareholder, Caisse de dépôt et placement du Québec, had already agreed to the sale. In July 2020, the European Commission approved the sale. Bombardier Inc. announced on 1 December 2020 that the transaction would be closed on 29 January 2021 for €4.4 billion.

== Products and services ==
=== Rapid transit rolling stock ===
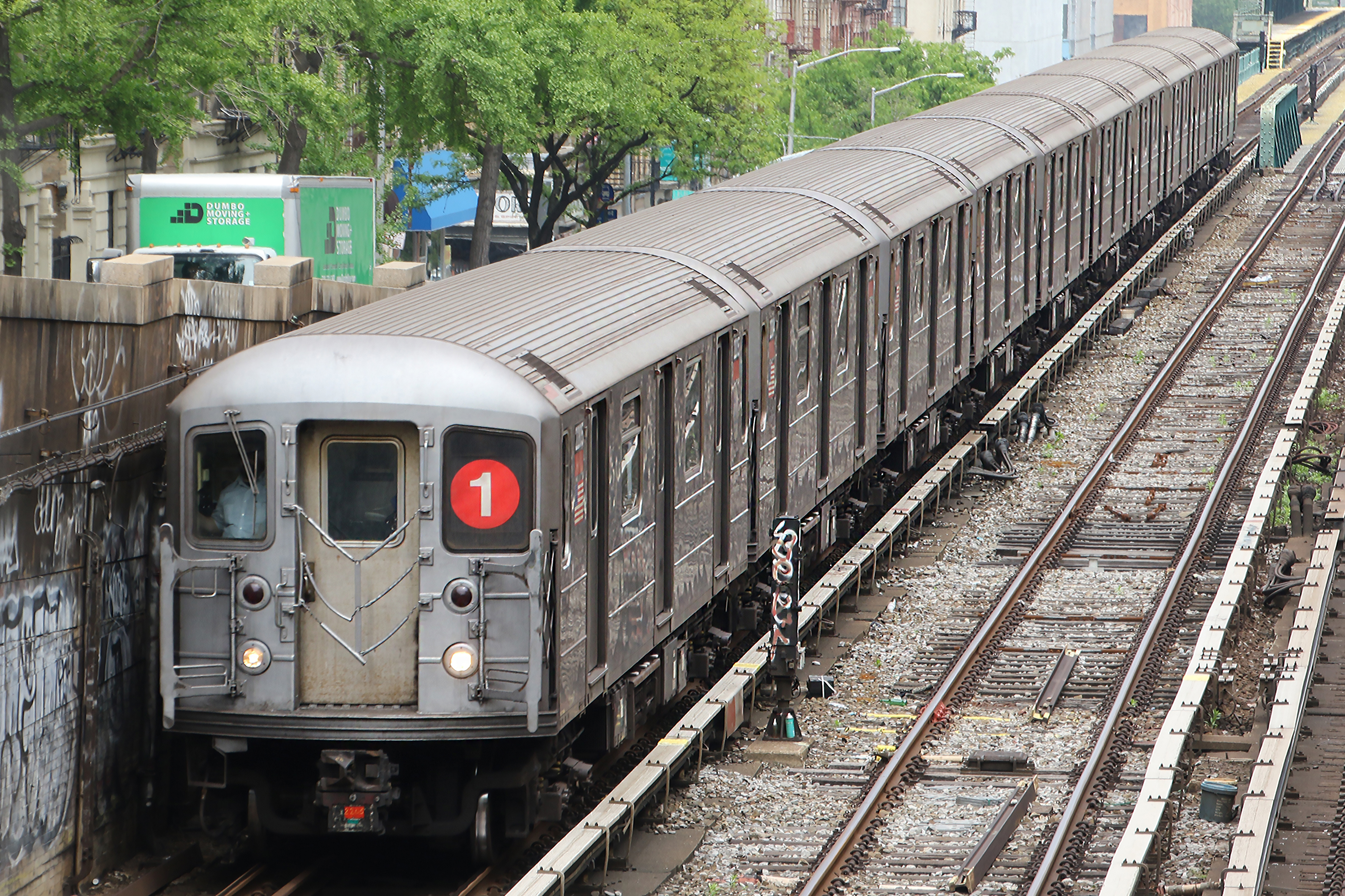
New York City Subway R62A car

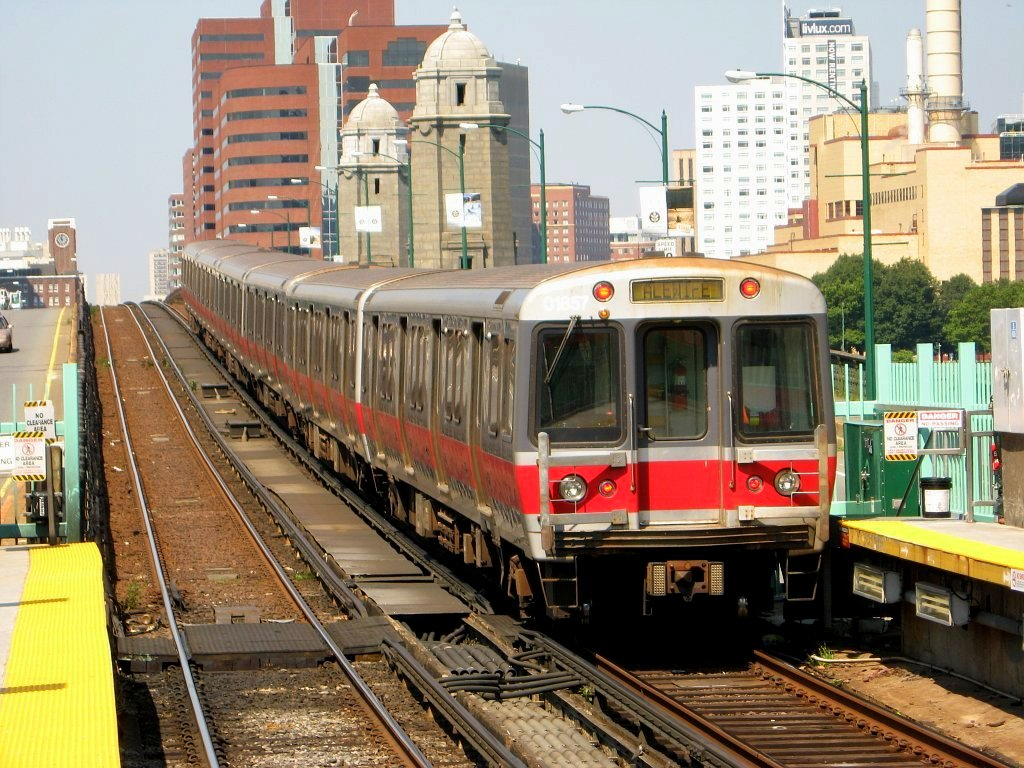
MBTA Red Line train (Boston Subway)

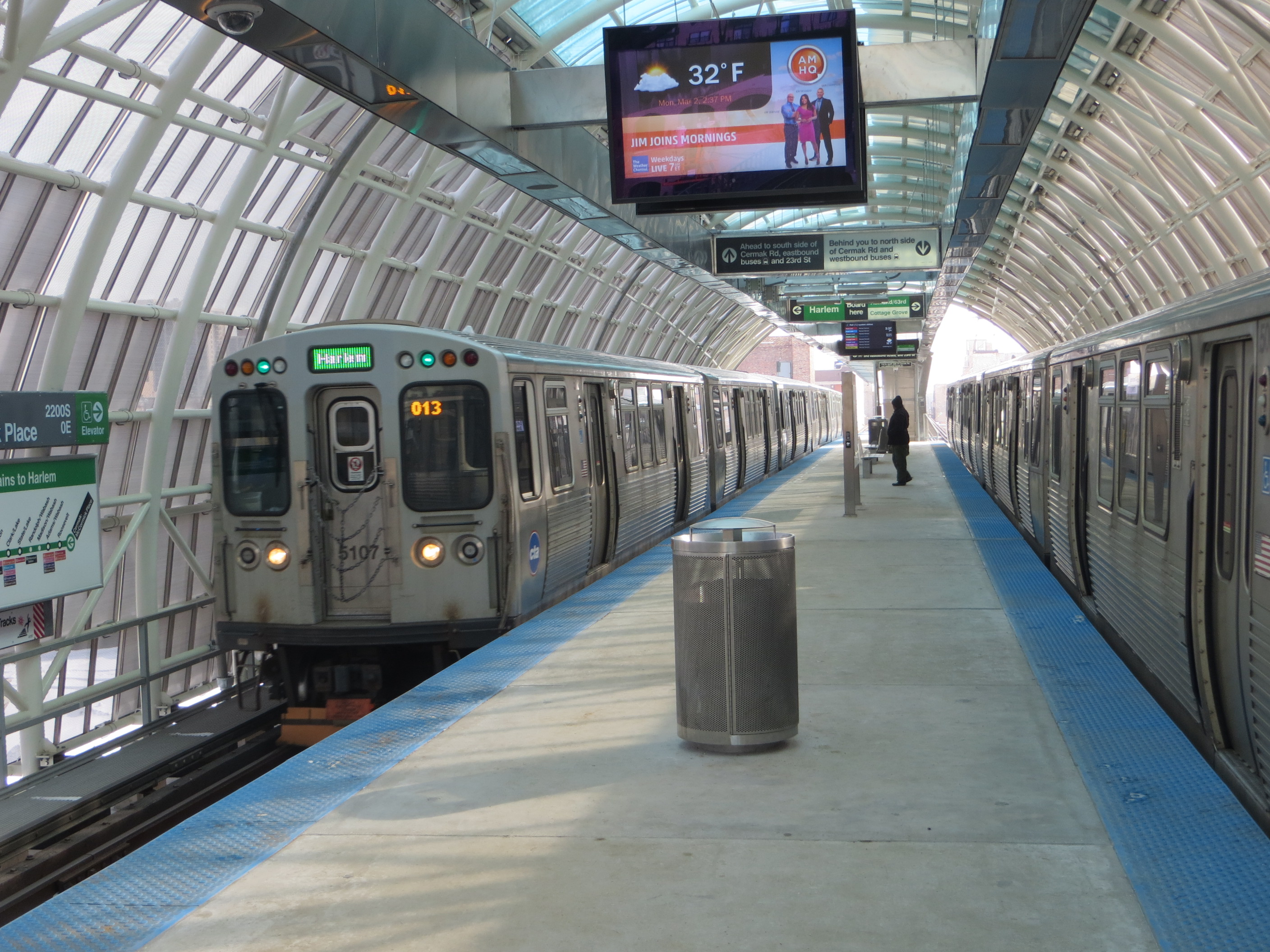
CTA 5000 in Chicago

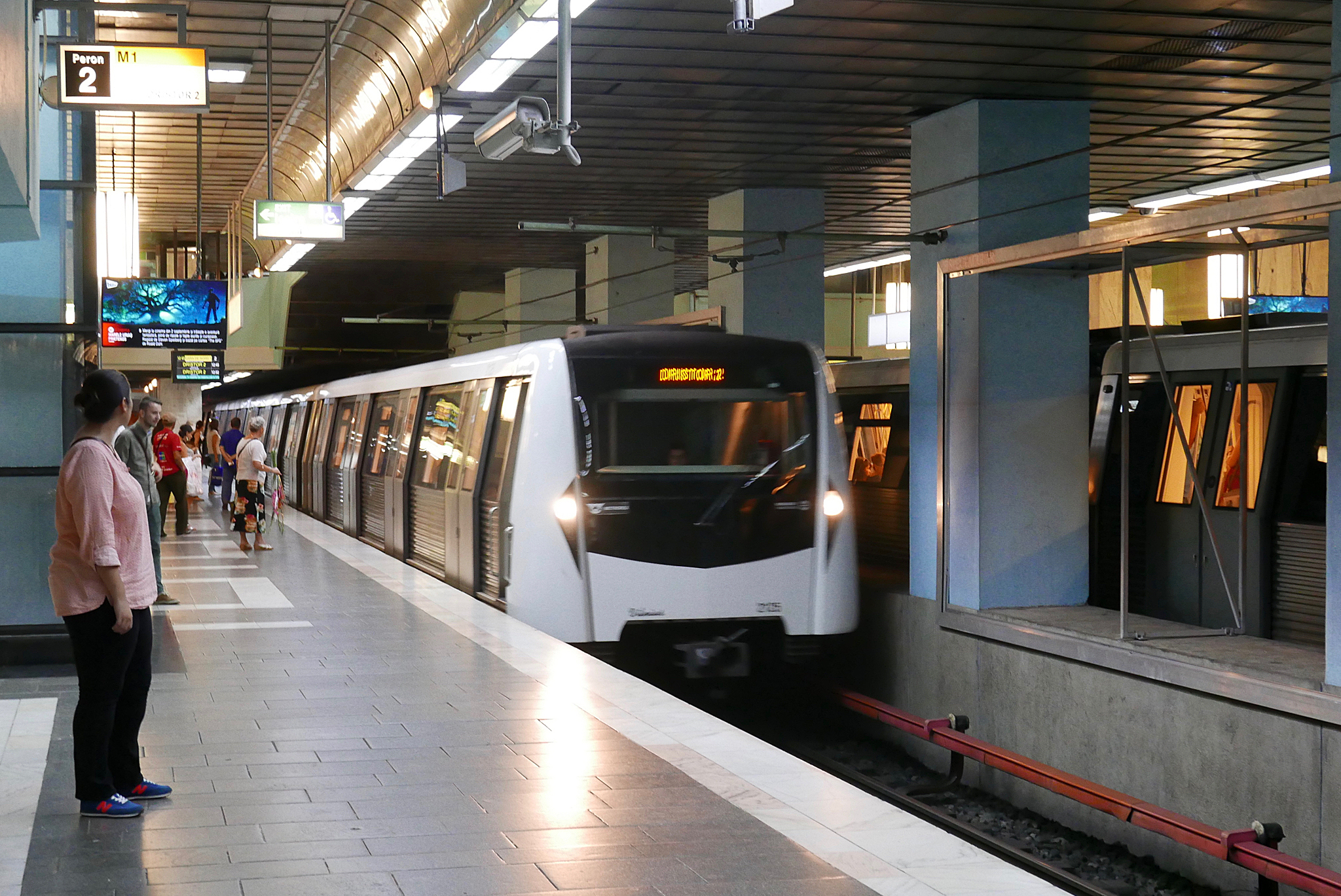
Bucharest Metro second-generation trainset

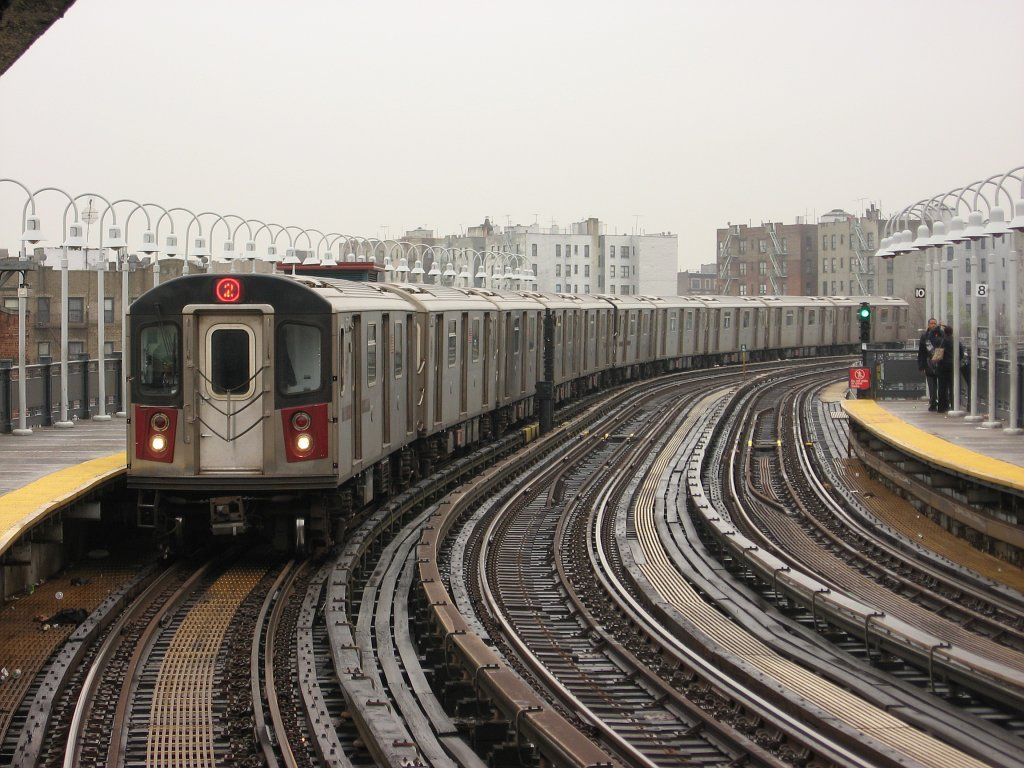
New York City Subway R142 car

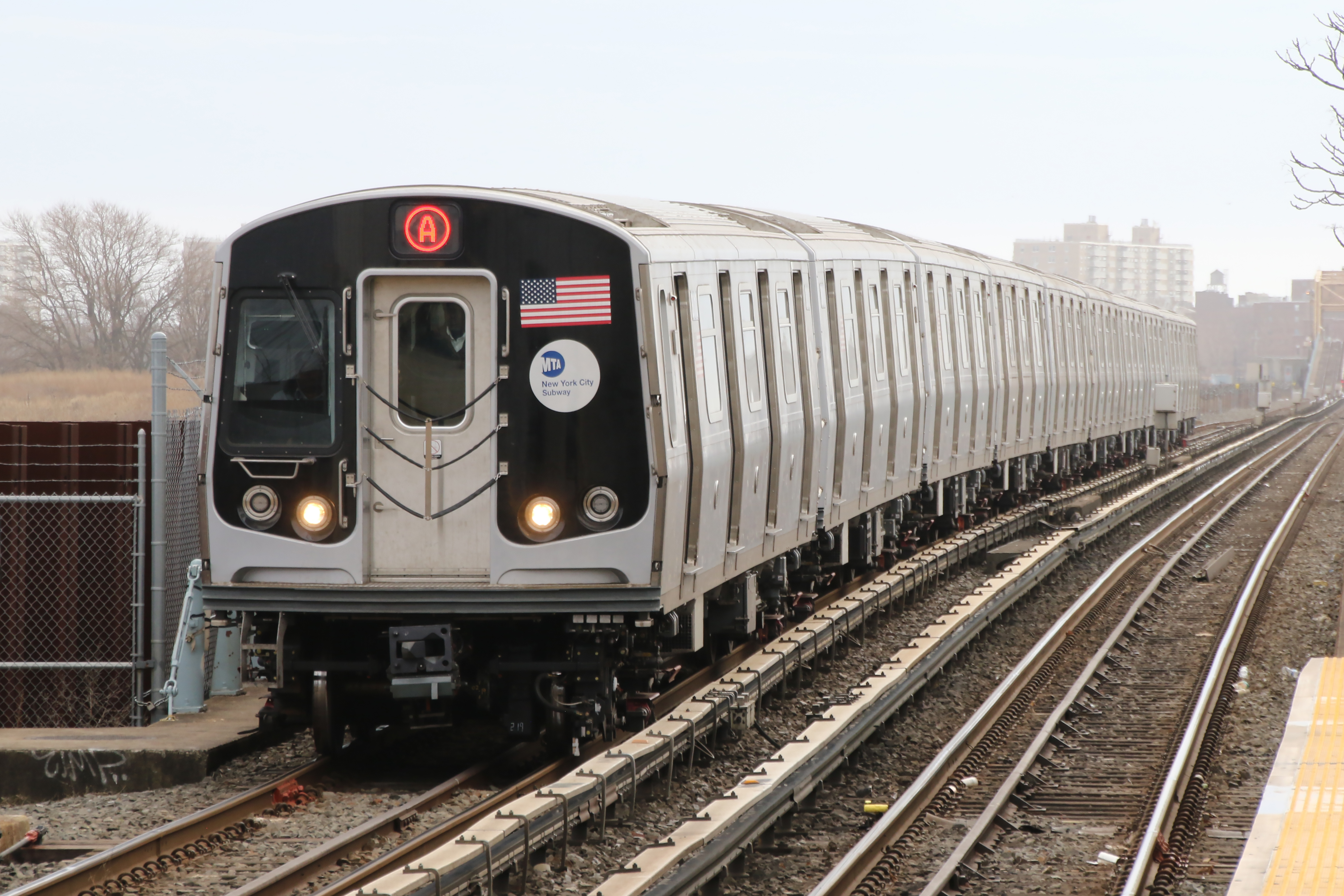
New York City Subway R179 car

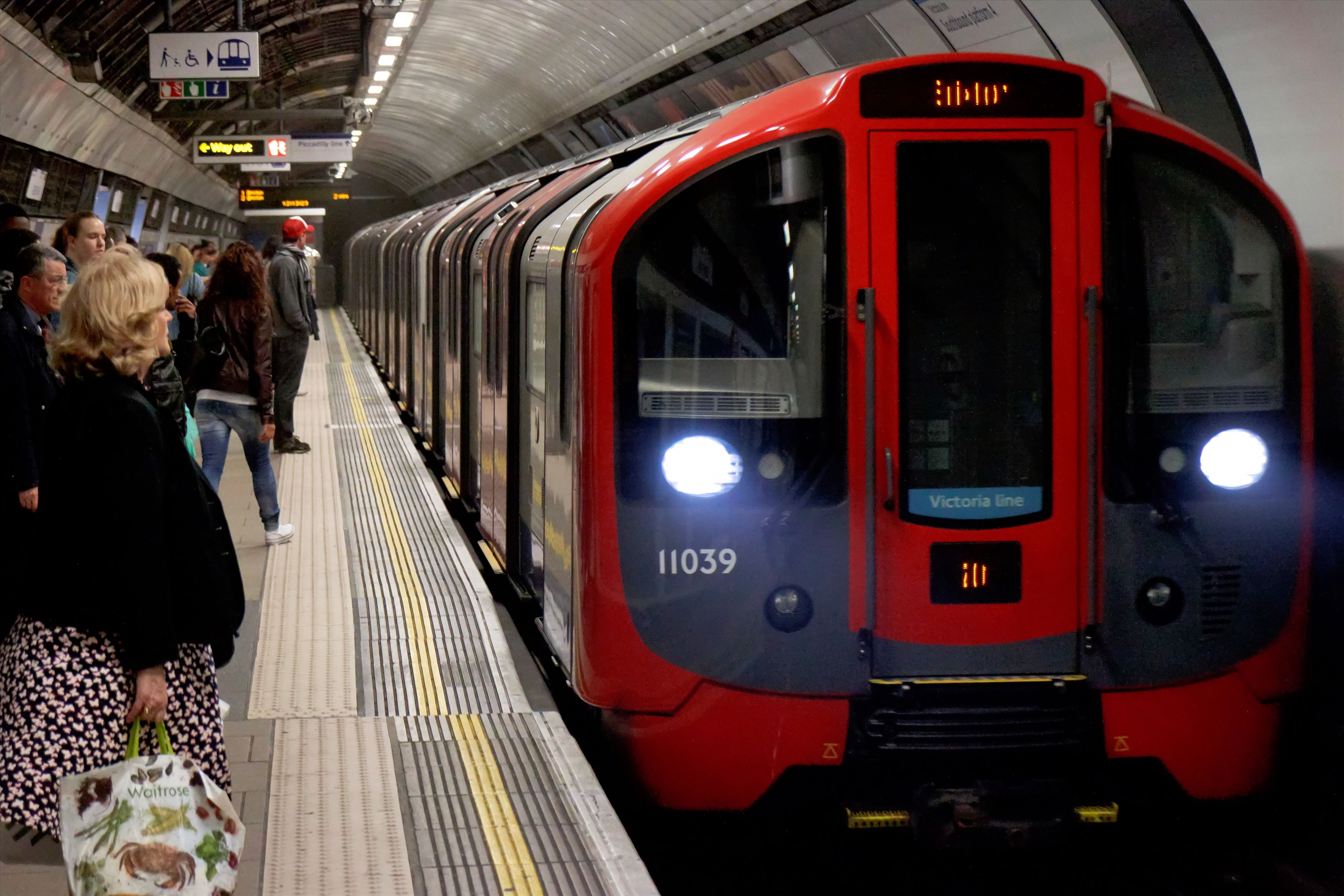
London Underground 2009 Stock

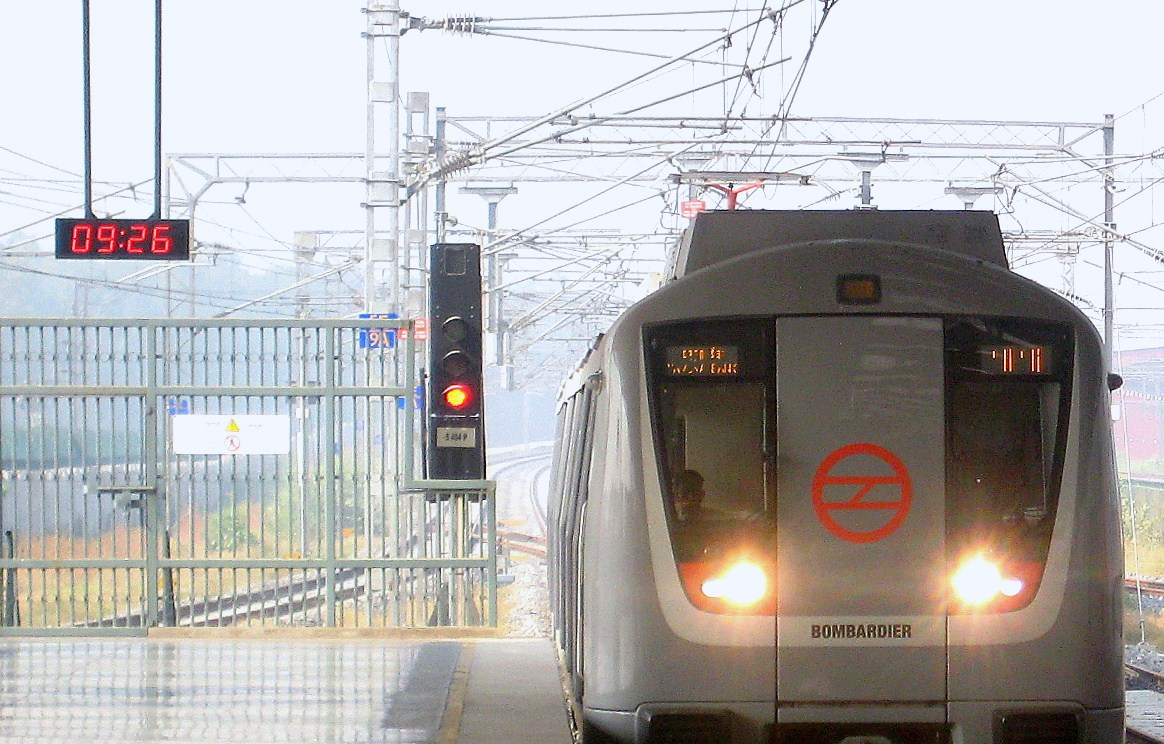
Delhi Metro Broad-gauge train

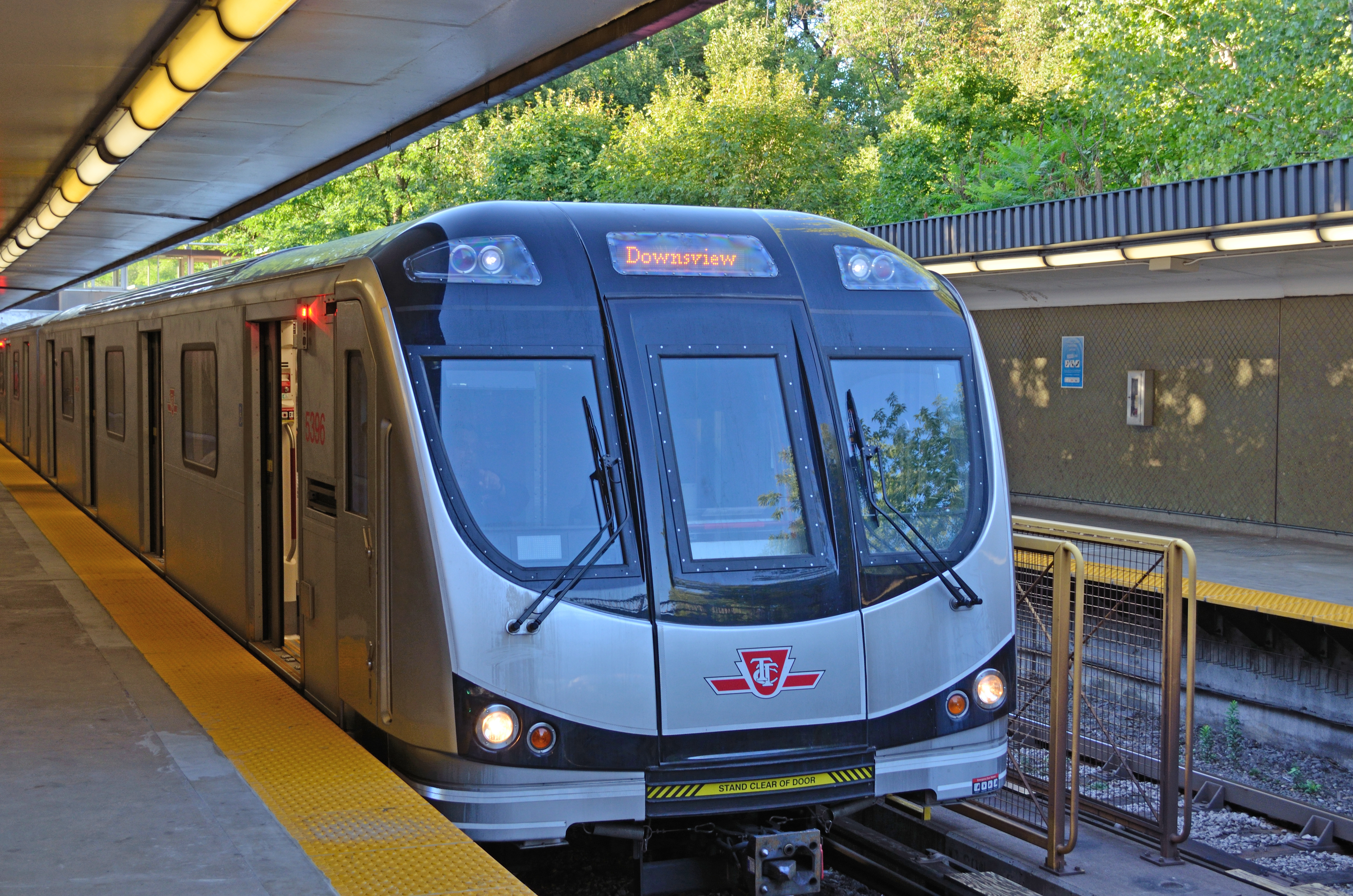
Toronto Rocket subway car

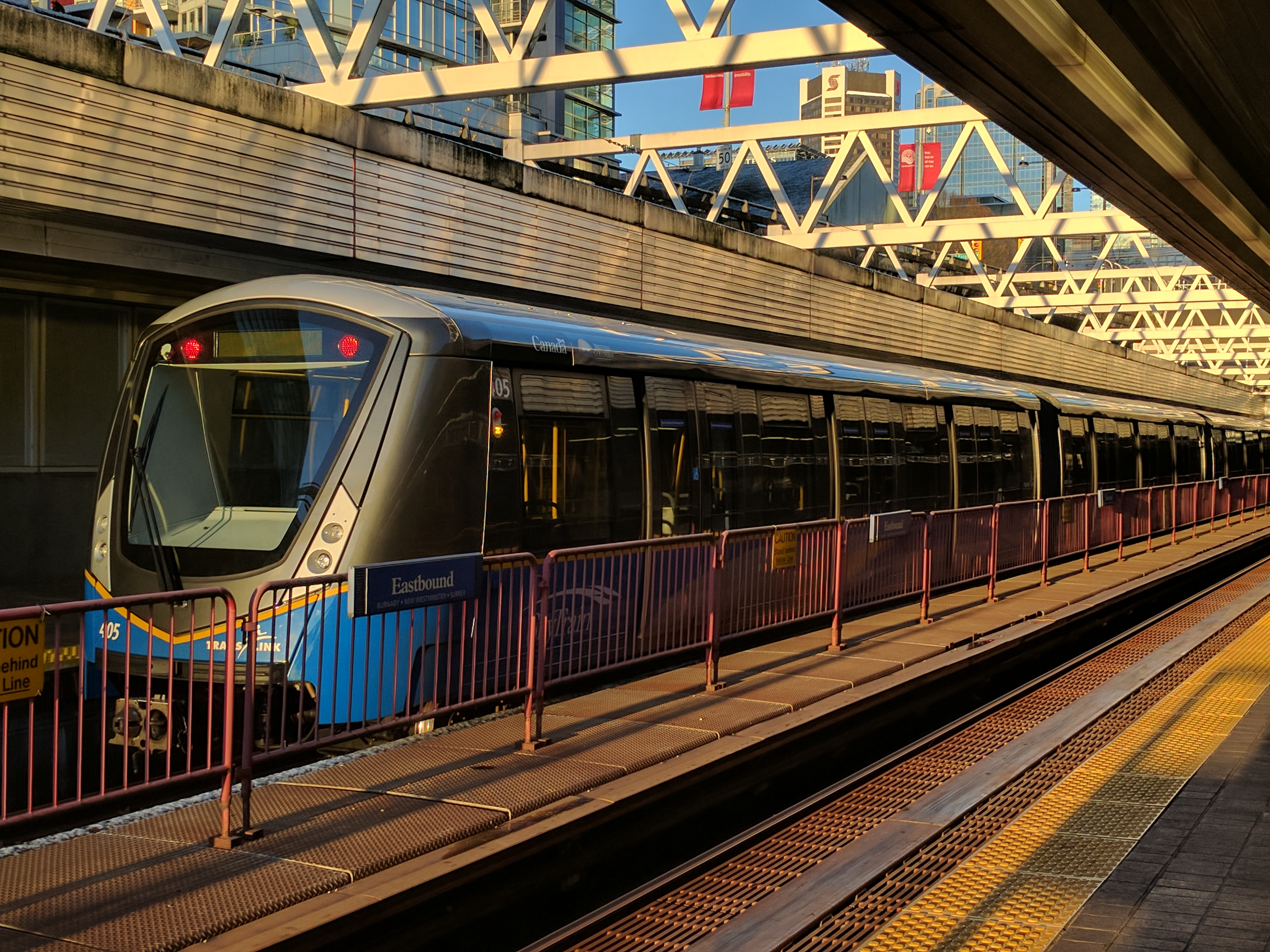
Bombardier Innovia Metro 300 car for the Vancouver Skytrain

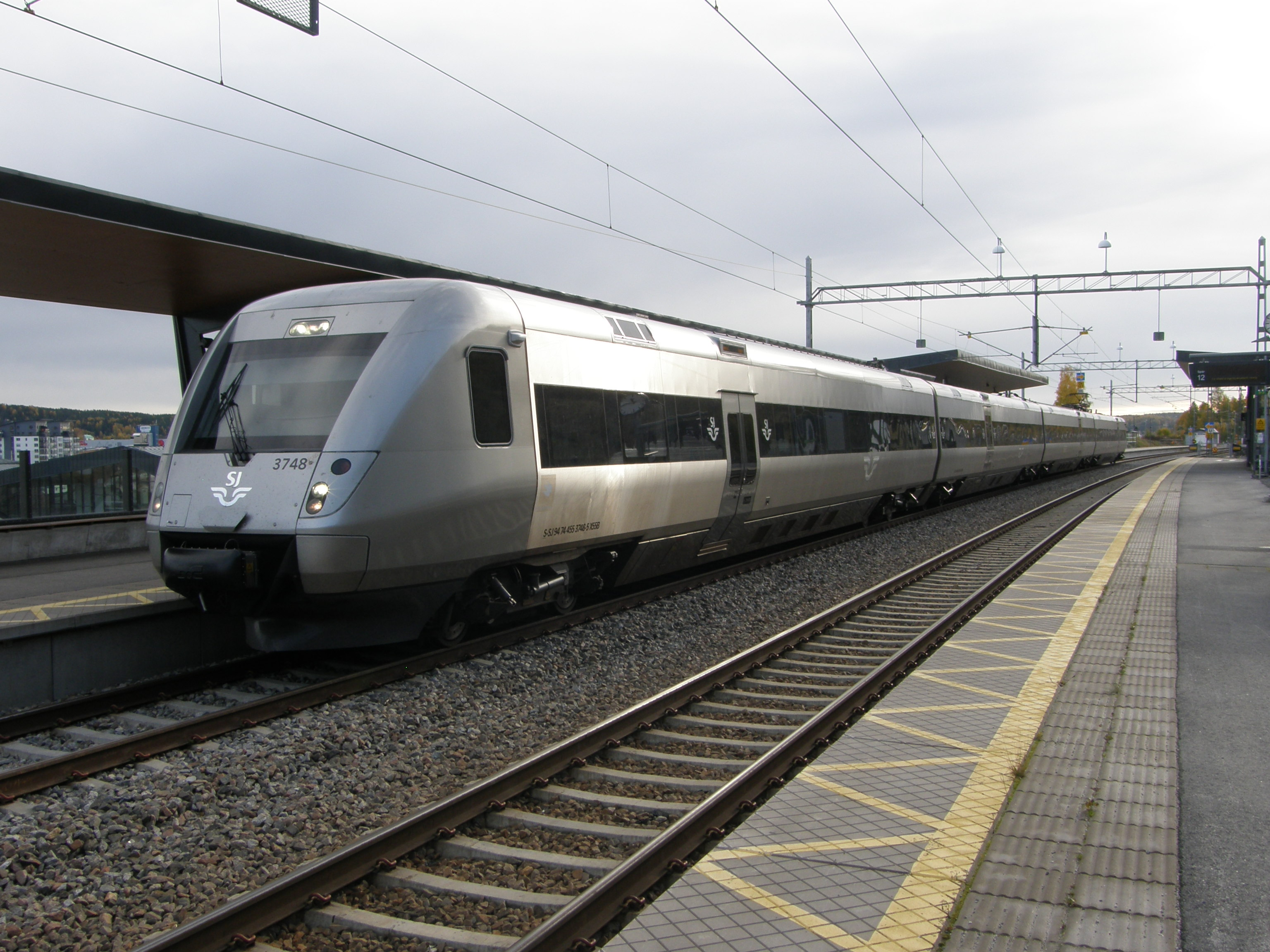
Regina (SJ 3000/X55) train at Örnsköldsvik Central Station

Bombardier's standard metro vehicles were the mid-sized fully automated and driverless Innovia Metro with the option for linear induction motor propulsion or a conventional rotary motor, and the high-capacity customizable Movia platform, which is powered by conventional motors and can also be fully automated. In addition, Bombardier produced many custom models not based on either model.

- AirTrain JFK: Innovia ART 200 (ART Mark II)
- Ankara Metro: Modified H-6
- BART: Fleet of the Future (type D and E cars)
- Beijing Subway: QKZ5 cars for the Airport Express line
- Berlin U-Bahn: H & HK train stocks
- Boston MBTA: "#3 Red Line" cars (01800 series)
- Bucharest Metro: Movia 346 for lines 1, 2 and 3
- Chicago "L": 5000 series
- Delhi Metro: Broad-gauge Movia trainsets
- Detroit People Mover: Innovia ART 100 (ART Mark I)
- Docklands Light Railway: B90, B92, B2K and B07 stock
- Helsinki Metro: M200
- Hong Kong MTR: A-stock
- Elizabeth line, London: Aventra Class 345
- London Underground: 2009 stock (Victoria line), S stock (subsurface routes)
- London Overground: British Rail Class 378 in 2009 and British Rail Class 710 in 2019
- Montreal Metro: MR-73, MPM-10
- Mexico City Metro: NC-82 (first Canadian rolling stock based on Mexican NM79 Series) NM-02 (co-built with CAF) and Bombardier participated in the refurbish and rehabilitation program for Alstom original MP68 rolling stock)
- New York City Subway: R62A, R110B, R142, and R179
- Rapid KL: Innovia ART 200 and 300 (ART Mark II and Mark III) cars for the Kelana Jaya Line
- Rotterdam Metro: Series 5300, series 5400, series 5500 (R stock / RSG3), and 5600 series (R stock / SG3)
- Shanghai Metro: Movia 456 (AC04)
- Singapore MRT: Movia C951 for Downtown MRT line in 2013. Movia R151 for North South and East West lines.
- Stockholm Metro: The new C30 stock cars, introduced in 2020.
- Taipei Metro: The extension line of Muzha Line system, which entered official operation on 4 July 2009. Innovia APM 256.
- Toronto subway: S series (produced by the Urban Transportation Development Corporation), T series, and Toronto Rocket (based on Movia)
- Vancouver SkyTrain: Innovia ART Mark I, ART Mark II and Innovia Metro 300 (ART Mark III)

=== Monorails ===
The company's main product was the Innovia Monorail. (Note: Bombardier Transportation acquired Universal Mobility Incorporated's UM III technologies in 1989. UMI produced nine monorail systems from 1969 to 1984, which are included in the list above.)

- Cairo Monorail – Two lines, 42 km (26 mi) October City to suburban Giza and 54 km (34 mi) Nasr City to New Cairo, Egypt (under construction, due to open in 2024)
- Cal Expo monorail 1968
- Carowinds Monorail 1973 – system closed in 1994 and sold to Vidafel Mayan Palace Resort in Acapulco, Mexico but still not in use
- Hersheypark monorail 1968; now as BlueCross monorail and acquired additional cars from Six Flags Magic Mountain
- Jacksonville Skyway monorail 1997; system built by Bombardier
- King Abdullah Financial District in Riyadh, Saudi Arabia: 3.6 km (2.2 mi) Bombardier Innovia Monorail 300 (under construction)
- King's Dominion 1975; dismantled in the 1990s when the Safari Village attraction was closed and sold to Jungle Jim's International Market
- Kings Island Action Zone monorail 1974; system removed in 1994
- Las Vegas Monorail 1995 – The Mark VI monorail still in operation today
- Line 15 (Silver) 2014 – São Paulo, Brazil: 24 km (15 mi) line INNOVIA Monorail 300
- Minnesota Zoo's Northern Trail monorail 1979
- Six Flags Magic Mountain Metro 1971; closed 2001 with cars sold to Hersheypark and system dismantled in 2011
- Tampa International Airport monorail 1991; system built by Bombardier
- Walt Disney World Resort 1989 – The Mark VI monorail still in operation today
- Miami MetroZoo 1984; system and cars acquired from 1984 Louisiana World Exposition
- Bukit Panjang LRT Line 2000; the Singapore Bukit Panjang LRT system with Innovia trains

=== Trams and light rail vehicles ===
- Flexity family
  - Flexity Outlook
    - Flexity Outlook (Toronto streetcar)
    - Flexity Outlook Cityrunner
    - Flexity Outlook Eurotram (also sold as the Socimi Eurotram)
  - Flexity Classic
  - Flexity Freedom
  - Flexity Swift
  - Flexity Link (tram-train)
  - Flexity Berlin
  - Flexity 2
  - Flexity Melbourne
  - Flexity Wien
- Incentro
- Cobra
- Max Light Rail Type 1 LRV in Portland, Oregon (1984–1986)
- Variotram (unit used on Helsinki tram network only; the Variotram brand has since been sold to Stadler Rail)

=== Locomotives ===
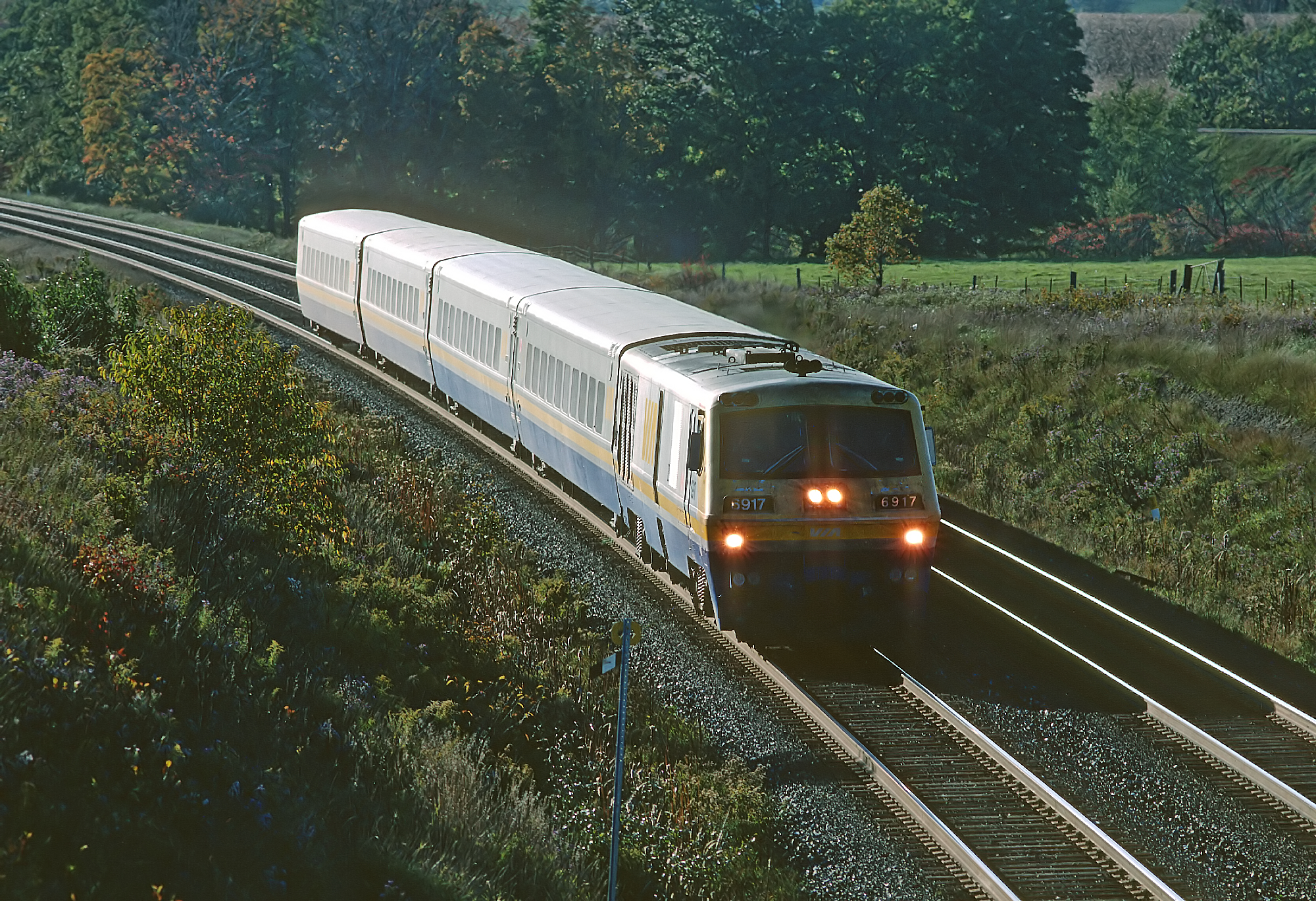
LRC trainset

Bombardier's locomotives were mostly linked to their acquisition of Adtranz and Montreal Locomotive Works, as well as joint venture with Alstom.

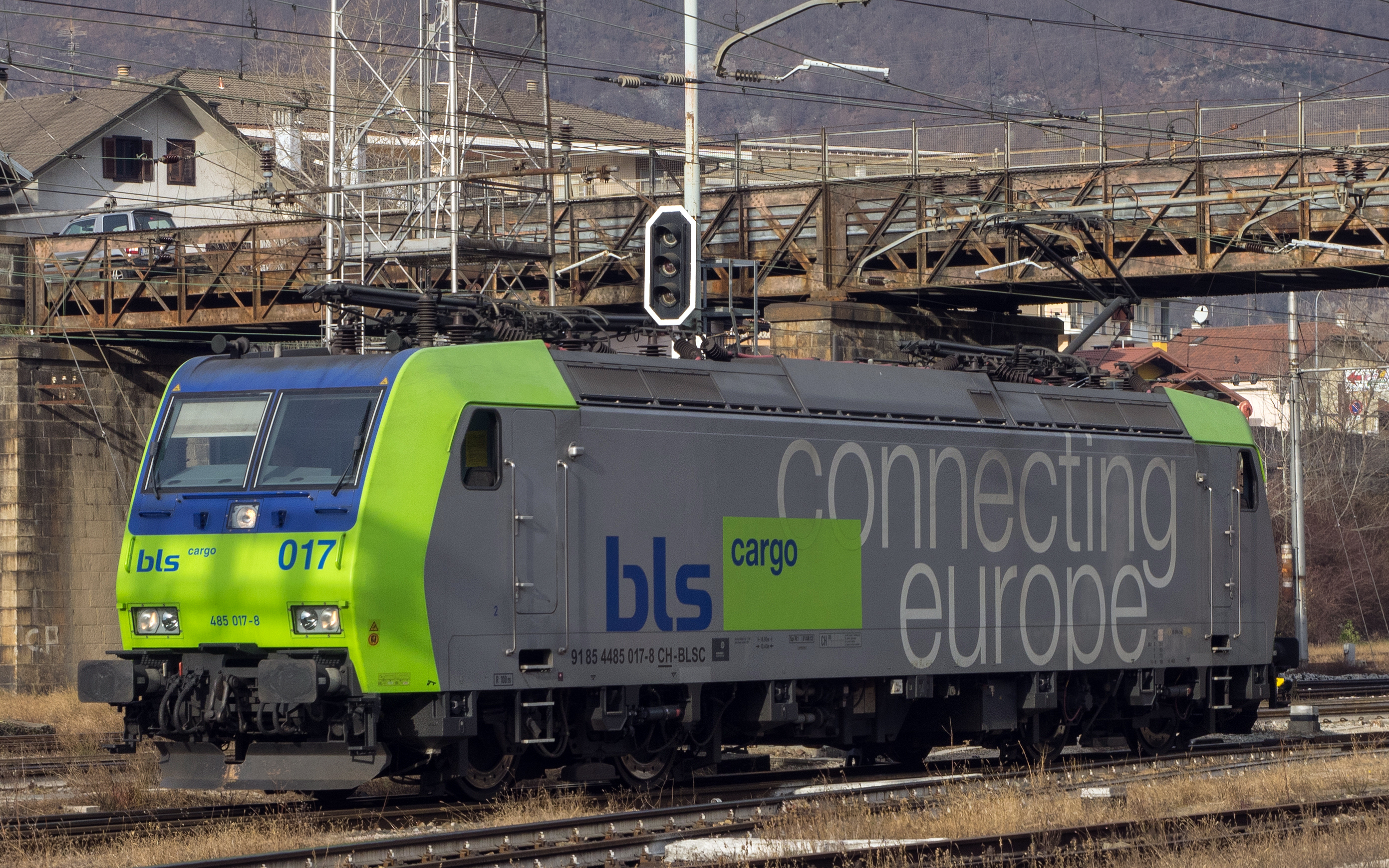
TRAXX electric locomotive

- ALP-46 – electric locomotive
- ALP-45DP – dual-mode locomotive
- EP10 – electric locomotive
- LRC – diesel locomotive
- Bombardier–Alstom HHP-8 – electric locomotive
- Iore – electric locomotive
- TRAXX – electric and diesel-electric locomotives
- FS Class E.464 – electric locomotive

Other than the LRC, all other locomotives were based on European designs.

=== Passenger cars ===
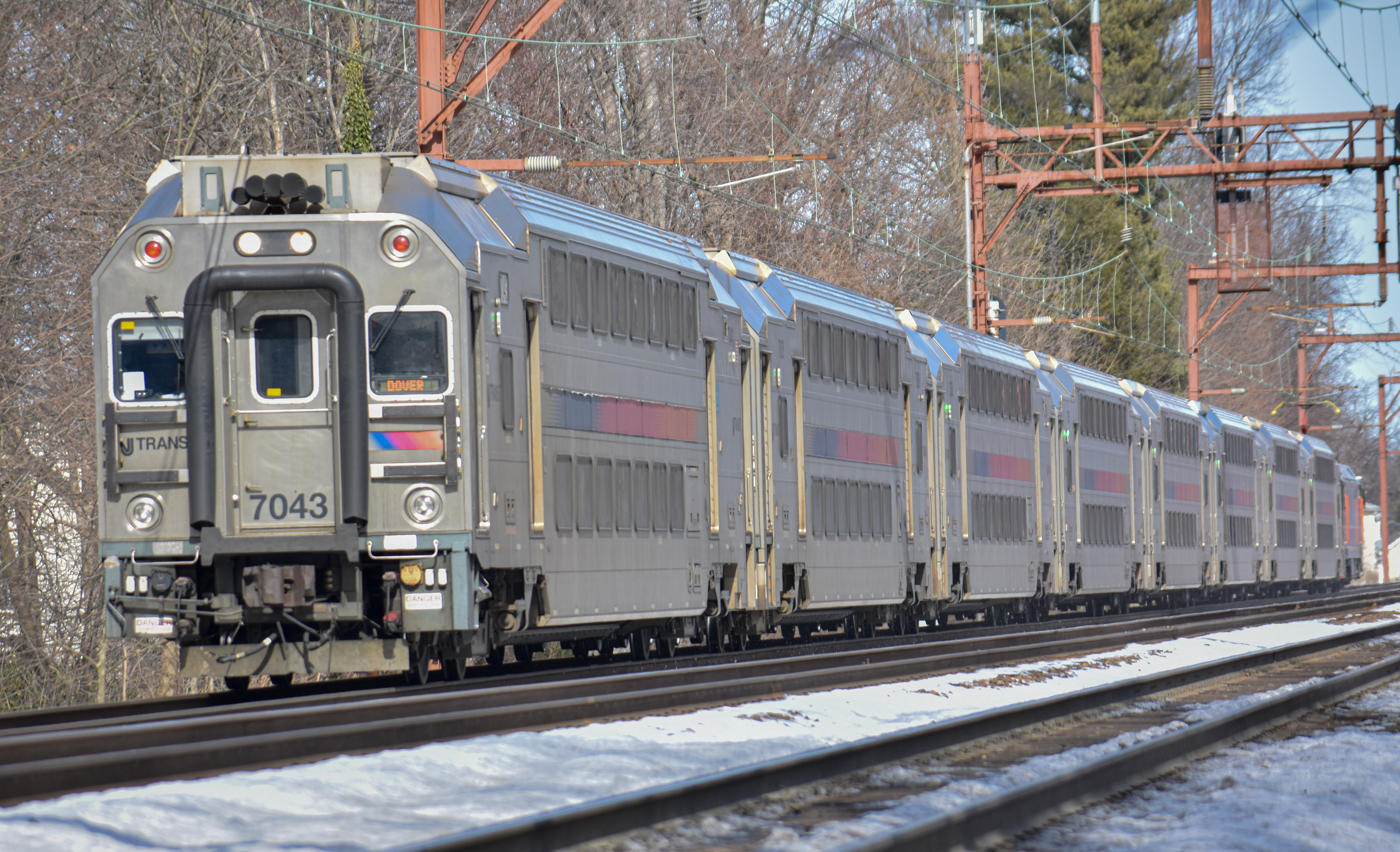
Multi-Level car

- BiLevel Coach – commuter rail
- MultiLevel Coach – commuter rail
- Double-deck Coach now renamed Twindexx
- Comet coaches – commuter rail
- Horizon coaches – intercity rail
- Shoreliner coaches – commuter rail
- LRC coaches
- Superliner II – intercity rail

=== Regular-speed multiple-unit trains ===
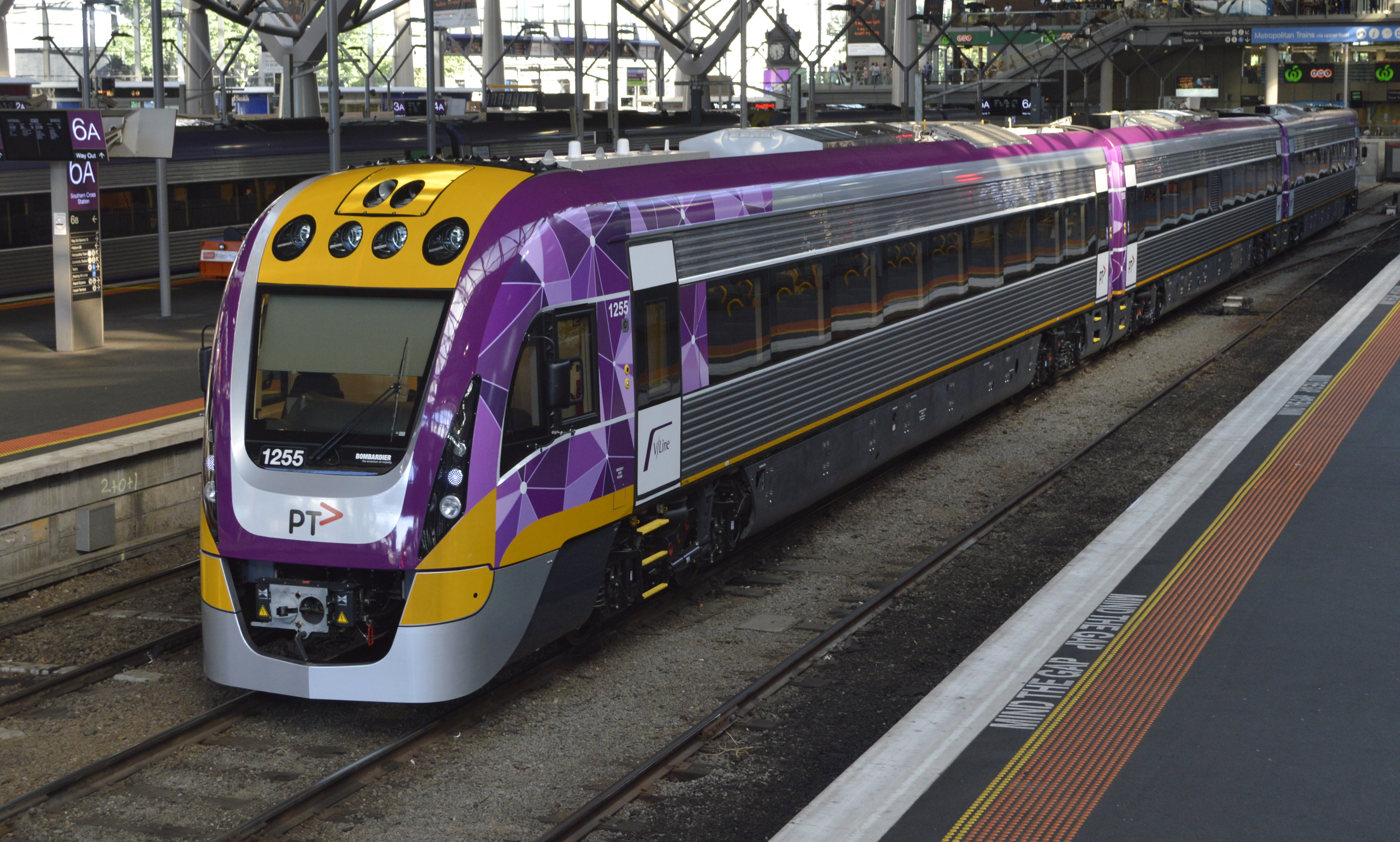
V/Line VLocity at Southern Cross Station in Melbourne, Australia

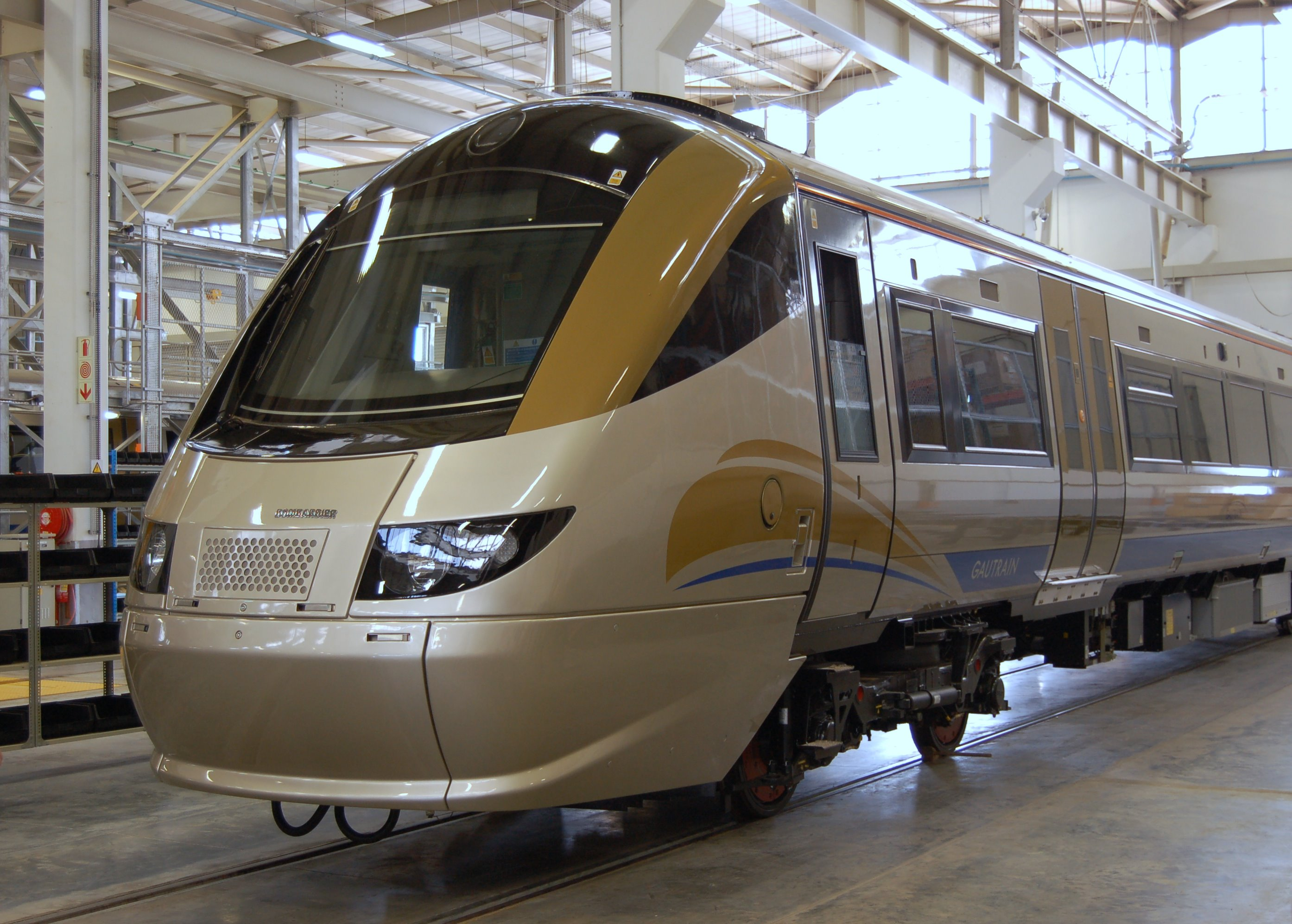
Gautrain Bombardier Electrostar

- Aventra – EMU, successor for the Electrostar
- Adelaide Metro 4000 class
- AGC (Autorail à grande capacité) – Dual mode or electric MU regional train
- Electrostar – EMU, (see also British Rail Classes 357, 375, 376, 377, 378, 379 and 387)
- Highliner – Double deck EMU commuter trains for Metra
- IC3 – EMU or DMU
- CP2000 (Portuguese Railways Class 3400)
- M7 – EMU commuter train for the Long Island Rail Road and Metro-North Railroad
- MR-90 – EMU commuter train for the Réseau de transport métropolitain Deux-Montagnes line.
- Itino – DMU regional train (originally developed by Adtranz)
- New Generation Rollingstock EMU's for Brisbane and South East Queensland
- RegioSwinger – tilting DMU
- Talent – DMU or EMU regional train
- Talent 2 – EMU regional train
- Talent 3 – EMU regional train. Production transferred to CAF in 2021.
- Turbostar – DMU counterpart to the Electrostar, (see also British Rail Classes 168, 170, 171 and 172)
- VLocity DMU trains for V/Line
- Spacium "Le Francilien" – EMU commuter train for the Transilien H, K, J, L and P lines
- Sprinter Lighttrain – 4 car EMU regional rail trainset for Nederlandse Spoorwegen
- Omneo – EMU for French operator SNCF
- Twindexx – EMU variation of the former German double-deck coach cars

=== High-speed trains ===
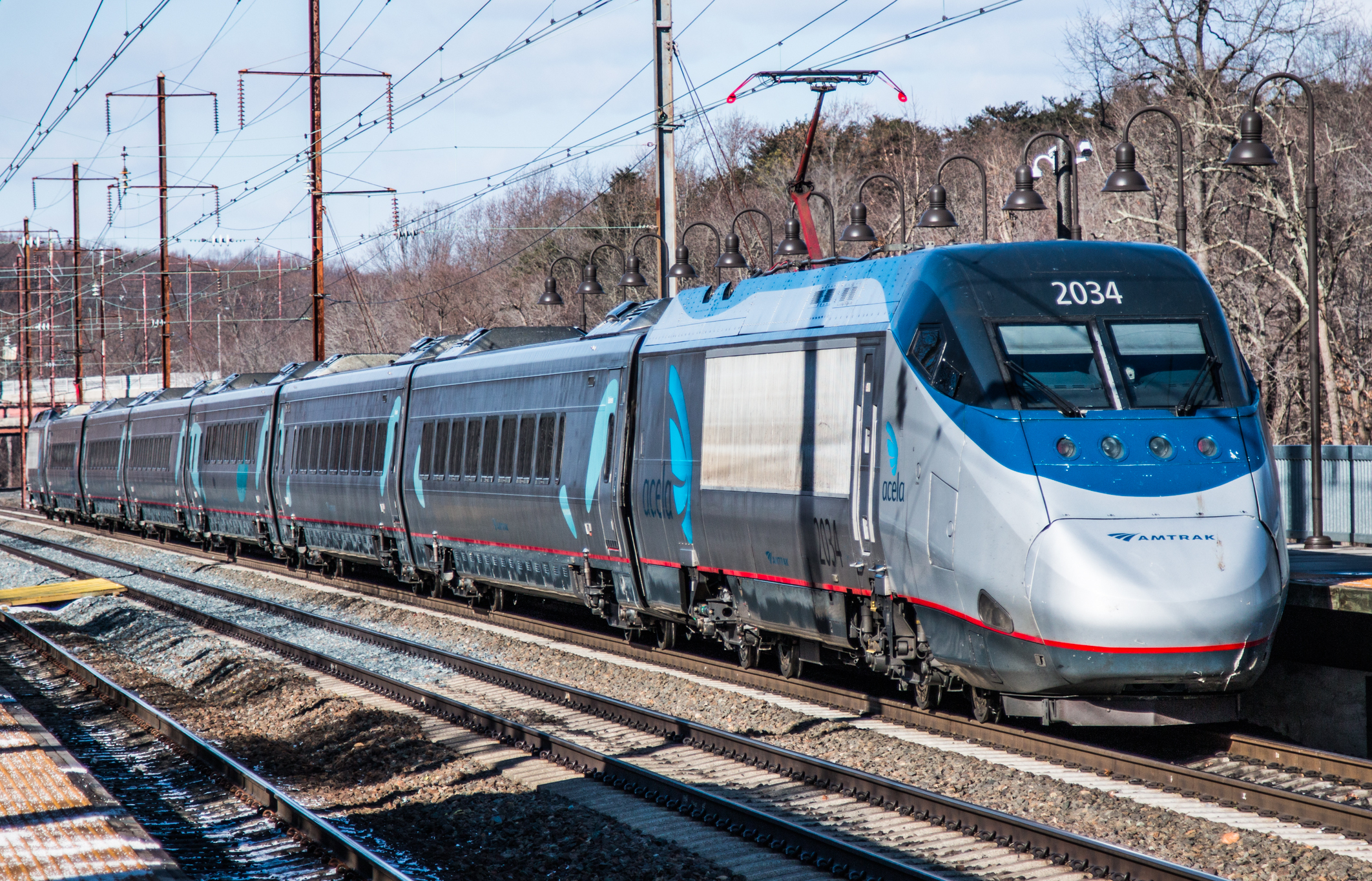
Acela train

- Acela (former leader of a project in which Alstom is a participant)
- Intercity Express (participant in a Siemens-led project)
- JetTrain (experimental)
- Regina
- Voyager, Super Voyager and Meridian diesel-electric multiple units
- Zefiro, trainsets built for the Chinese market, which have a maximum speed of 380 km/h (240 mph) Transferred to Hitachi Rail in 2021.
- AVE S-102 (Talgo-350) and Alvia S-130 (Talgo 250) with Talgo.

=== People movers ===
- Guided Light Transit (GLT)
- Bombardier Innovia

Bombardier also supplied propulsion units, train-control systems, bogies, and other parts, and maintained train fleets.

== Services ==
In addition to manufacturing a wide variety of passenger rail vehicles and locomotives, Bombardier Transportation provided services for commuter train providers.

- Maintenance: Bombardier Transportation had several maintenance contracts for the servicing of commuter trains. This includes fuelling, storage, train washing and upkeep. Some of its key clients were GO Transit, MARC Train, Réseau de transport métropolitain, and Metrolink.
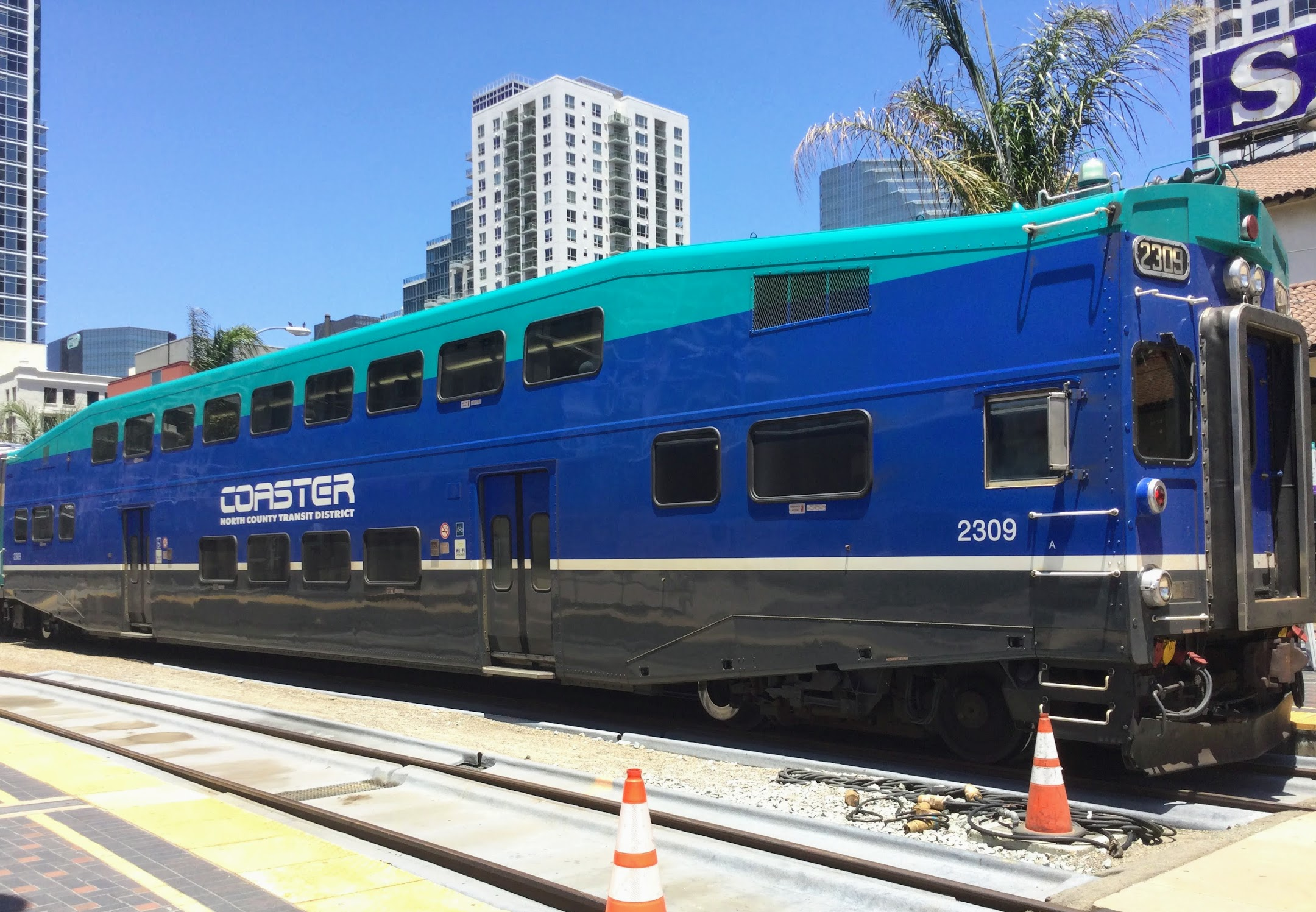
  NCTD Coaster Phase II livery Bombardier BiLevel Coach cab car at the San Diego Santa Fe Depot.
- Train operation: Bombardier Transportation operated a number of commuter and light rail systems under contract with various transit agencies. It was the operator for six of the seven GO Transit commuter train lines in Ontario from 2008 to 2015. As of February 2015, It operated all GO Transit rail train lines. In 2015, it also began the operation of the Union Pearson Express airport link in Toronto. Other systems operated by Bombardier include SunRail in central Florida, MARC Train's Brunswick and Camden Lines in Washington and Maryland, the Sprinter and Coaster lines in the San Diego area, and the River Line in New Jersey. The company also operated a number of airport people-mover systems, typically systems it built, such as the AirTrain JFK and AirTrain Newark in New York City under contract with the Port Authority of New York & New Jersey.
- From 2012/2013, the Savli factory (India) is also planned to assemble Electro-Motive Diesel products for Asian customers.
- In November 2016, Bombardier Transportation signed an eight-year contract worth of $331 million to supply operating and maintaining services with Réseau de transport métropolitain's six commuter rail lines in Montreal.

== Facilities ==
Bombardier Transportation had production facilities or product development sites in:

- Africa:
  - South Africa: Traction converter equipment factory at Isando, opened 2016.
- Asia:
  - China: Joint ventures with native companies Bombardier Sifang (Qingdao) Transportation Ltd, CRRC Changchun Railway Vehicles, CRRC Puzhen Bombardier Transportation Systems Limited, Bombardier NUG Propulsion and Signaling Systems, Shentong Bombardier (Shanghai) Rail Transit Vehicle Maintenance Company. Together these joint ventures produced over 4,700 railway passenger cars, 580 electric locomotives and 3,000 metro cars, Monorail, APM and trams for China's rail transit market.
  - India: Movia-car manufacturing and electrical component manufacture in Vadodara, Gujarat.
- Europe:
  - Austria: Sites include Bombardier Wien Schienenfahrzeuge (former Lohner-Werke)
  - Belgium: Passenger vehicles, at former BN Constructions Ferroviaries et Métalliques plant
  - Czech Republic: freight rolling stock
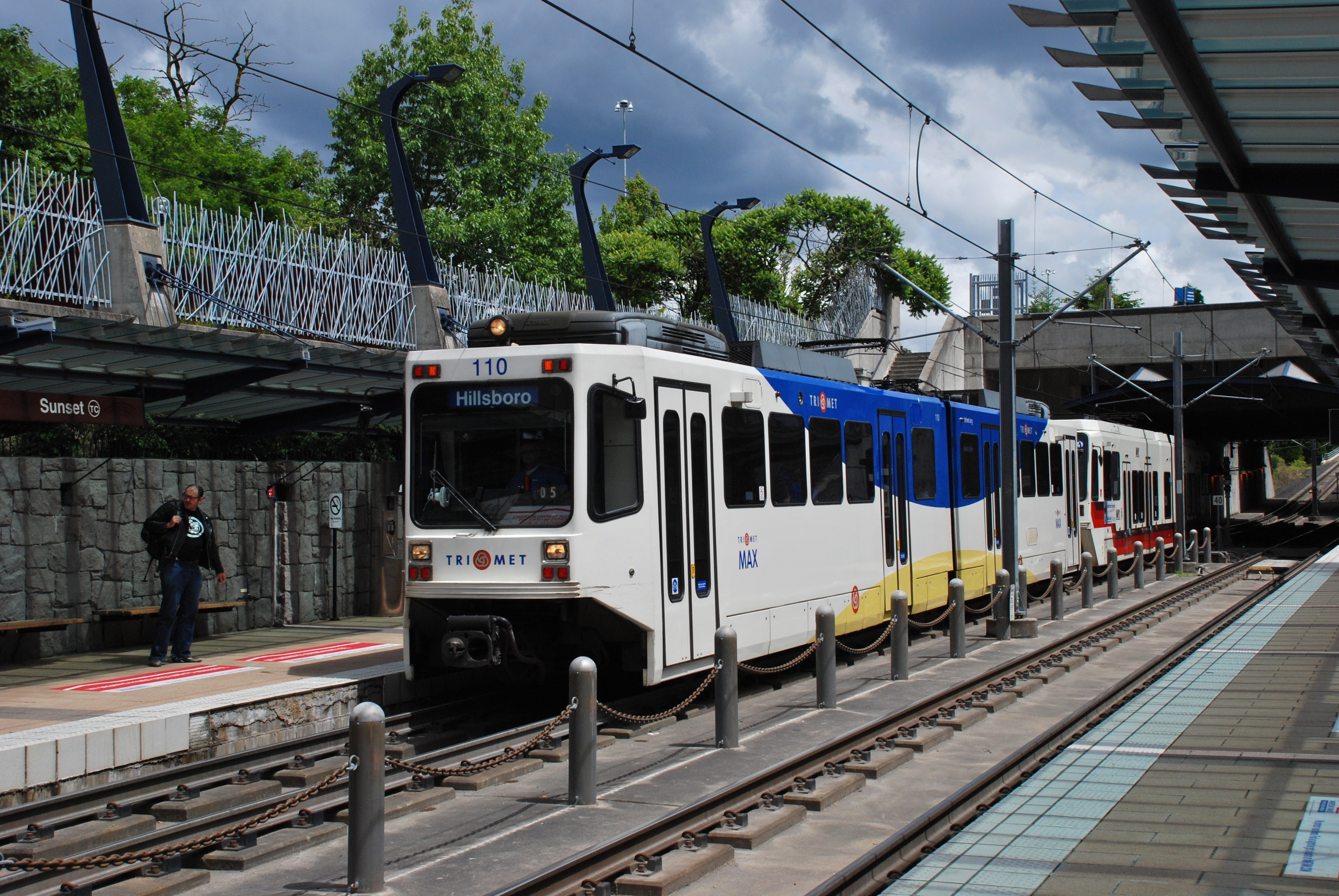
  - Bombardier "Type 1" (TriMet)
    Denmark: Continues production of IC3 "flexiliner" passenger multiple units.
  - France: Regional and suburban trains, metros, at former ANF Industrie plant in Crespin (north of France).
  - Germany: Major facilities for production of mass transit, regional, and high speed passenger trains. Control systems. Diesel and electric locomotive manufacture. Sites include :
    - Former LEW Hennigsdorf near Berlin
    - Former Henschel & Son locomotive works in Kassel
    - Former ABB Werk-Sued Mannheim – rail vehicle drive and control systems; passenger and signalling systems; inductive charging (PRIMOVE); as well as project management, sales and fleet management/), and others.
    - Former Waggonbau Görlitz plant producing Double-deck Coaches
  - Greece: From 1999 to 2009 Bombardier manufactured train parts for the then OSE SA which were assembled by the Hellenic Shipyards Skaramaga with other companies.
  - Italy: Production site for FS Class E.464 at former Tecnomasio plant in Vado Ligure
  - Norway: Servicing of Adtranz products NSB Class 73 and GMB Class 71 built at former Adtranz factory in Strømmen (see Strømmens Værksted), also manufactures NSB Class 93
  - Poland: (Bombardier Transportation Polska), included manufacturing site in Wrocław (former Pafawag factory), Katowice, Łódź and Warsaw.
  - Romania: Underground trains in Bucharest, mass transport.
  - Spain: Trapagaran
  - Sweden: Production, engineering, development Also manufactured Regina EMUs.
  - Switzerland: Research and design – propulsion and bogies, also manufacture of high capacity (double decker) passenger vehicles. Sites include former Ateliers de Constructions Mécaniques de Vevey in Villeneuve
  - United Kingdom: Derby Litchurch Lane Works – Manufacturing Turbostar, Electrostar and Aventra passenger multiple units and London Underground stock such as the S stock and 2009 stock.
- North America:
  - Canada: Engineering facilities in Saint-Bruno-de-Montarville, Quebec and Millhaven, Ontario (former Urban Transportation Development Corporation facility); manufacturing facilities in Thunder Bay, Ontario (former Canadian Car & Foundry Can-Car Rail plant), and La Pocatière, Quebec (former Moto-Ski plant)
  - Mexico: Ciudad Sahagún (former Concarril factory) – engineering and production site.
  - United States:
    - Plattsburgh, New York
    - West Mifflin, Pennsylvania (originally Westinghouse Electric and ADtranz)
    - Pittsburg, California (originally AnsaldoBreda, leased from Hitachi Rail)
- Oceania:
  - Australia: Bombardier Transportation Australia – Dandenong, Victoria and Milton, Queensland
- South America:
  - Brazil: Monorail manufacturing facility in Hortolandia São Paulo state.

== Legal issues ==
=== Deutsche Bahn ===
In early 2013, Deutsche Bahn announced that it was suing Bombardier for €350 million because of some serious defects in trains used on the suburban S-Bahn rail network in Berlin. This was in addition to the €160 million it was asking for from Bombardier because of problems with more than 200 regional trains operating in southern Germany and problems with the brakes in regional and local trains in Munich. The matter was settled out of court in March 2015. Lutz Bertling, head of Bombardier's transportation division at the time, confirmed the two firms had come to an agreement, saying: "The settlement is a positive signal for our future cooperation."

=== Everline ===
In January 2015, the Canadian Broadcasting Corporation (CBC) reported that South Korea's Special Investigation Unit for anti-corruption produced a report accusing Bombardier Transportation of corruption in the pursuit of the 2004 contract to build an 18 km (11 mi) elevated Light Rapid Transit (LRT) rail system called the Everline connecting the Giheung Station on the Bundang (Yellow Line) of the Seoul Metropolitan Subway system to a large amusement park named Everland, via Yongin, the 12th largest city in South Korea, about 30 km (19 mi) from central Seoul.

The investigation report alleges that Bombardier provided gifts and trips to Canada for civil servants and politicians involved in the contract decision, which was based on revenue expected from an inflated estimate of 180,000 passengers per day using the service. It also alleges that Bombardier created a $2-million slush fund for the Canadian citizen Kim Hak-Pil, a high-ranking Bombardier executive in South Korea. Bombardier has consistently denied the corruption allegations, stating that "They were not pleasure trips. There is a need to convince the people that our technology works well.... If it had been corruption, they would have charged us." The statute of limitations has now expired, due to lack of evidence according to Bombardier.

Everline operation has been financially troubled since construction was completed in 2010. The system remained dormant until service began in 2013 while the line owner successfully negotiated with the city of Yongin a minimum revenue guarantee of 29.5 billion KRW per year regardless of passenger load. This is said to be a serious burden for the city because ridership is reported to have risen to only about 20,000 passengers per day on the 30 carriages, or about a quarter of the maximum possible capacity of the fleet in a 12-hour day. A reason suggested for this is the fare of 1100 KRW (about US$1 in 2015); it is impossible to pay for Everline trips via a transfer surcharge on a connecting subway ticket. A 2014 web page of a Seoul tour service retailer makes no mention of the Everline among the suggested modes of bus transport between Seoul and Everland. A lawyer who filed legal action on behalf of the citizens of Yongin is reported to have provided details about Bombardier's pursuit of the contract. He said that "between 2003 and 2005, Bombardier funded three luxurious trips to Canada to each of 37 people" including 18 Yongin city councillors on so-called "LRT field trips".

=== Toronto Transit Commission ===
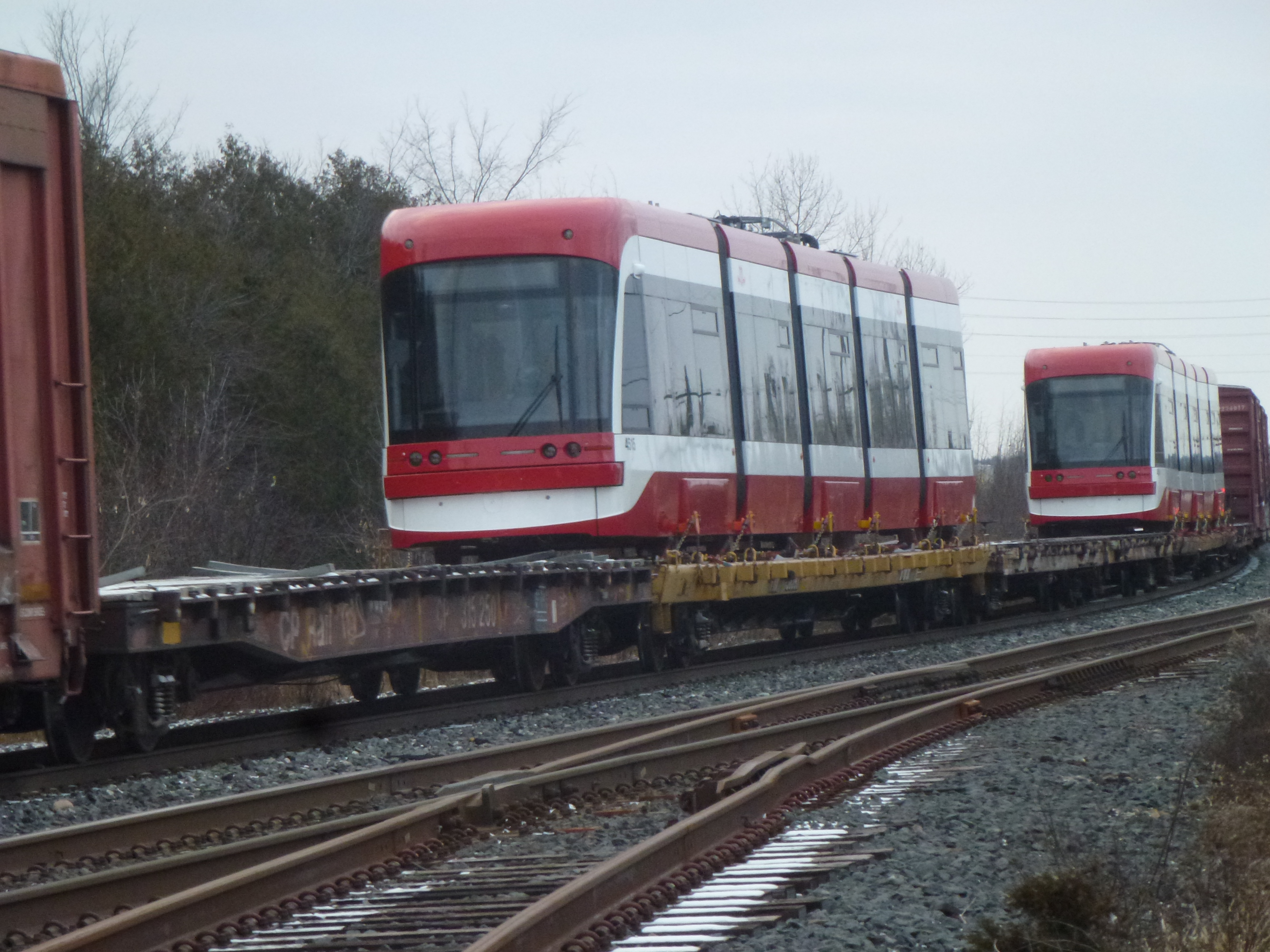
Toronto Flexity streetcars in 2018

On 16 October 2015, the Toronto Transit Commission (TTC) announced that it had asked its board to consider legal action against Bombardier. TTC staff is recommending that the TTC board "commence legal action, or make a claim allowed for already in the contract, of $50 million for late delivery" against Bombardier. Bombardier had committed to delivering 67 custom-built Flexity Outlook streetcars to the TTC by October 2015 for its streetcar system, but only 10 were in service at the time.

On 28 October 2015, the TTC board voted in favour of a lawsuit against Bombardier "for at least $50 million to recoup lost costs", according to board chair Josh Colle, because of the company's failure to deliver the additional new streetcars.

== See also ==
- Hyundai Rotem
- Kawasaki Heavy Industries Rolling Stock Company
- Nippon Sharyo
