= Las Vegas Monorail =

Monorail in Clark County, Nevada, U.S.

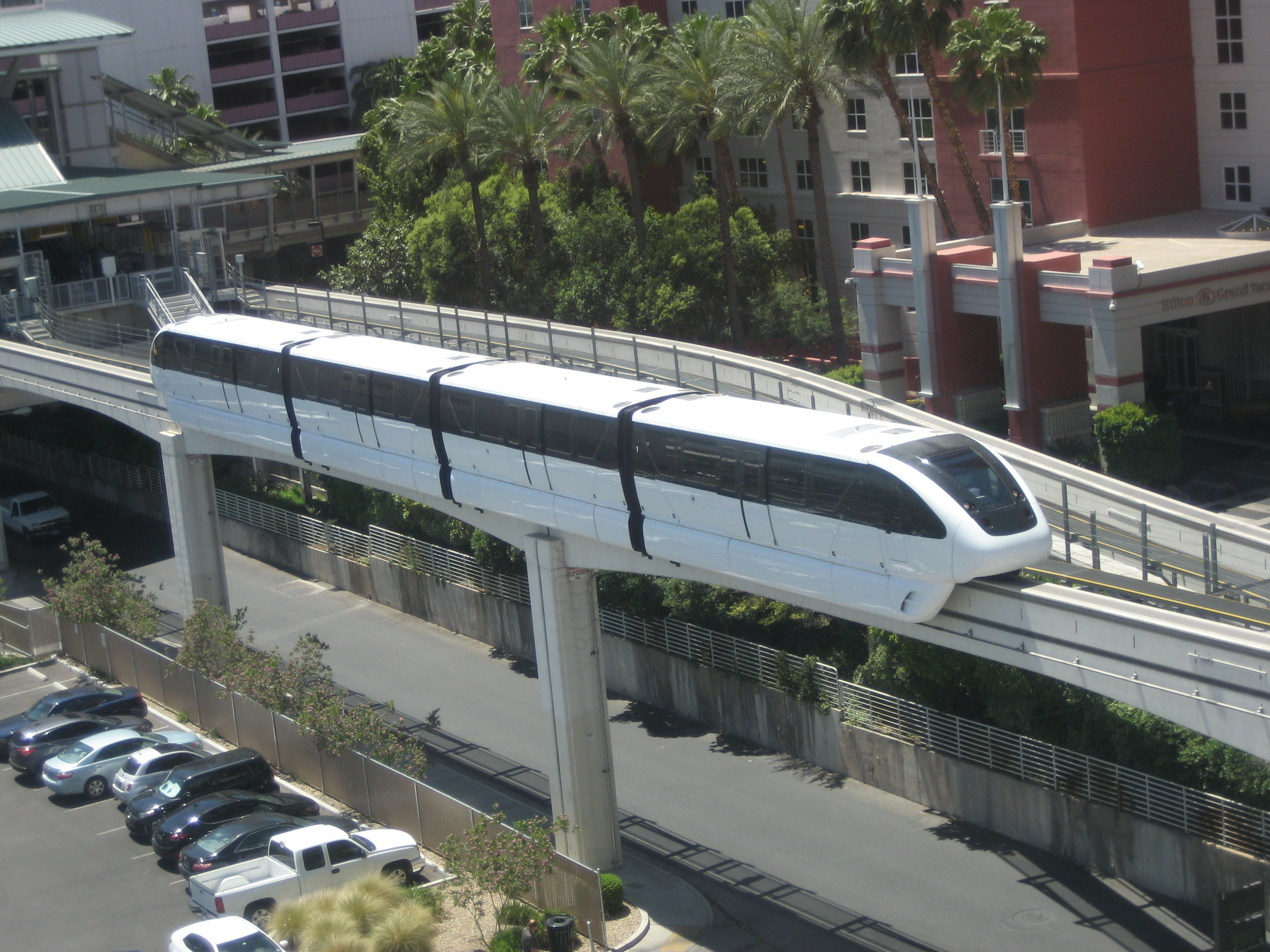
- A Mark VI train of the Las Vegas Monorail

Overview
- Status: Open
- Owner: Las Vegas Convention and Visitors Authority
- Locale: Paradise and Winchester, Nevada
- Termini: Sahara; MGM Grand
- Stations: 7
- Website: lvmonorail.com

Service
- Type: Straddle beam monorail
- Operator: Western Management Group
- Rolling stock: 9 Bombardier Innovia Monorail 200 trains
- Daily ridership: 11,780 (2022)

History
- Opened: 1995 (MGM Grand-Bally's Monorail); July 15, 2004 (Las Vegas Monorail)

Technical
- Line length: 3.9 mi (6.3 km)
- Num of tracks: 2
- Character: Elevated
- Minimum radius: < 60 m (200 ft)
- Electrification: 750 V DC contact rails on the side of the beam
- Operating speed: 50 mph (80 km/h)
- Highest elevation: 60 ft (18 m)
Route map
Las Vegas Monorail highlighted in blue

The Las Vegas Monorail is a 3.9-mile (6.3 km) automated monorail mass transit system located adjacent to the Las Vegas Strip in Clark County, Nevada, United States. It connects several large casinos in the unincorporated communities of Paradise and Winchester just south of Las Vegas city limits. Built at a cost of $650 million, it was privately owned and operated by the Las Vegas Monorail Company until their 2020 bankruptcy. It was then sold to the Las Vegas Convention and Visitors Authority, a local government agency. In 2022, total annual ridership was roughly 4.3 million, down from a pre-Great Recession peak of 7.9 million in 2007. The monorail is a registered not-for-profit corporation, allowed under Nevada law since the monorail provides a public service. The State of Nevada assisted with bond financing, but no public funds were used for construction. In 2025, it was announced that the monorail is planned to be operational until 2035; after that, further plans exist to transform it into part of the Vegas Loop system.

== History ==
=== 1995–2002: MGM Grand-Bally's Monorail ===
The Las Vegas Monorail began service as the MGM Grand-Bally's Monorail in 1995. This system ran between the MGM Grand and Bally's hotels using two used Mark IV monorail trains that had operated on the Walt Disney World Monorail. Built through a partnership between the two hotels, the MGM-Bally's system's construction was contracted to VSL Corporation. The grand opening party for the monorail featured showgirls from Bally's famed show, Jubilee!, helping groups to the monorail. Characters from The Wizard of Oz greeted the groups on the MGM side. The two trains each ran back and forth on each beam, and were stored at a maintenance building near the Bally's station (this building still stands today, but it has been severed from the beam).

=== 2002–present: Las Vegas Monorail ===
In 2002, the original system was closed to begin its conversion to the current Las Vegas Monorail system. The beam was extended from Bally's station (now the Horseshoe & Paris station) north to the Sahara Hotel and Casino. The track was extended south beyond the MGM station to provide for track switching for the trains, as well as a starting point for a potential future southern extension. The original trains were replaced with nine new Bombardier Mark VI monorail trains.

During testing and commissioning, the monorail suffered several malfunctions that delayed the start of passenger service for almost a year. The most serious of these problems related to parts falling from the monorail to the ground under the tracks. After many delays, the finished Las Vegas Monorail opened to the public on July 15, 2004 with the completion and testing of "Phase 1".

On September 8, 2004, more problems with falling parts led to the closing of the monorail for nearly four months. It reopened on December 24, 2004. A number of repairs were made to the monorail cars during this shutdown. Each time the monorail system required major engineering changes, it underwent a lengthy "commissioning" process to confirm the effectiveness and safety of the repairs. Officials reported that each day the monorail was down cost the system approximately $85,000 in lost fares.

Transit Systems Management officials cited the successful handling of crowds during the 2005 Consumer Electronics Show as proof that the system could handle a major convention.

On July 8, 2005, Transit Systems Management announced that it would shut down, turning over its responsibilities to the Las Vegas Monorail Company, the system operator. Curtis Myles, a former deputy general manager of the Regional Transportation Commission of Southern Nevada, became President of the Las Vegas Monorail Company.

On November 1, 2005, the County Commission approved a study into the feasibility of an airport extension.

On January 13, 2010, the Las Vegas Monorail filed for Chapter 11 bankruptcy protection. The filing did not affect system operations and had no impact on the monorail's hours of operation or service to its customers.

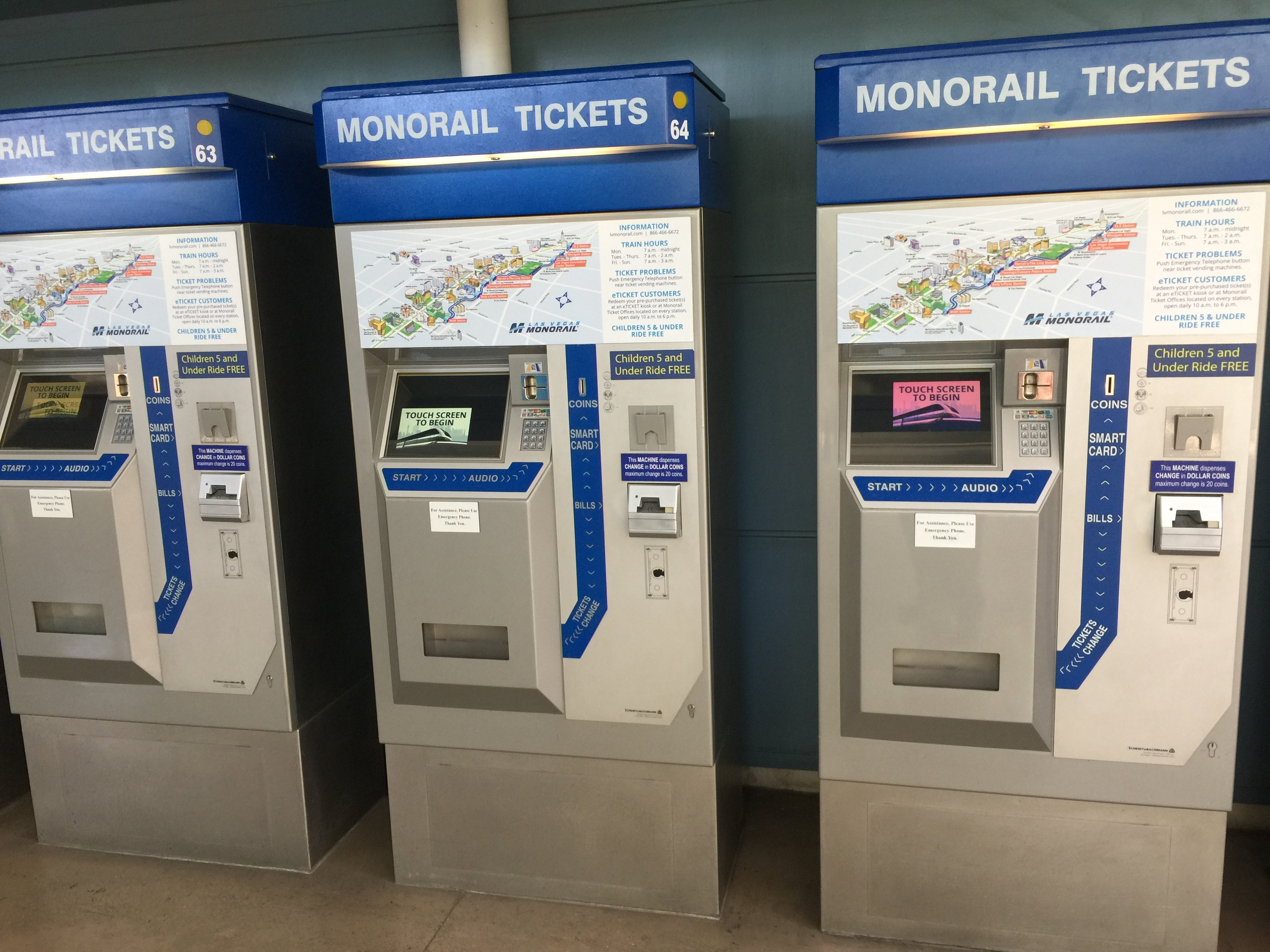
Fare vending machine for the monorail

On March 11, 2011, the Sahara announced that it would close its doors on May 16, 2011. Closure of the Sahara has been cited as one of the significant reasons for ridership dropping in 2012. In 2014, a new hotel casino, the SLS Las Vegas, took over the Sahara, and ridership increased from 2012 levels.

An infill station at Sphere was planned but put on hold in 2020. A report in 2022 confirmed that talks about constructing the station wouldn't resume until after the venue's opening.

The Las Vegas Monorail again filed for Chapter 11 bankruptcy protection in September 2020, amid the COVID-19 pandemic and in December a deal was finalized to transfer ownership to the Las Vegas Convention and Visitors Authority.

In 2024, it was reported the Monorail would be forced to shut down by 2028, as the company who made their parts had gone out of business and they only had enough supplies to operate for a few more years. The LVCVA denied the reports, though it did not offer an explanation on how it would continue operations after the supply shortage. In May 2025, LVCVA chief Steve Hill said the Monorail received $12 million in funding to keep the system operational until 2035, with the New Las Vegas Stadium being a major reason for the funding as it is across the street from MGM Grand. Hill also indicated after the monorail's eventual closure, the monorail tracks will be used for the Vegas Loop with two repurposed lanes for the cars and all current stations would be kept.

== Operations ==
The monorail (Phase 1 of the overall project) begins at the MGM Grand near the south end of The Strip, and runs roughly parallel to the Strip on its eastern side. The monorail passes next to the Convention Center and the Westgate Las Vegas, both with stations, before ending at the Sahara hotel at the north end of the Strip. The ride takes about fifteen minutes to travel its total distance of 3.9 miles (6.3 km).

The monorail generally runs behind the eastern Strip side hotels and casinos, a long block away from the Strip. Usually, it requires a walk through a casino to get to the Strip, emerging upon the Strip in front of the property. This lack of a direct presence on the Strip along with ticket prices has been a factor in the rather slow acceptance of the monorail.

=== System name and sponsorship ===
Former logo of the monorail

The Las Vegas Monorail was named the Robert N. Broadbent Las Vegas Monorail in honor of Robert N. Broadbent, whom Las Vegas officials credit with gaining the support from the public and officials needed to bring the monorail to fruition. Broadbent, a former Boulder City mayor, Clark County commissioner, assistant secretary of the United States Department of the Interior, and McCarran International Airport director, died in 2003, a few months before the system's scheduled opening. The Las Vegas Monorail Company is the company's official corporate name.

The Las Vegas Monorail generates revenue from ticketed passengers and from corporate sponsors. Branding rights for the seven stations and the nine trains are available, and the sponsorship prices are in the millions of dollars. Hansens Beverage sponsored the first monorail train, featuring its Monster Energy drink. Nextel Communications created a totally themed pavilion by branding the largest station, adjacent to the Las Vegas Convention Center. Since the Sprint-Nextel merger in late 2005, Nextel Central was rebranded as Sprint Central. However, in late February 2008, the Sprint Nextel Corporation terminated its sponsorship contract.

=== Construction and planning ===
The Las Vegas Monorail was designed by Gensler of Nevada, engineered by Las Vegas-based Carter & Burgess (now Jacobs Engineering Group, Inc.) and constructed by Granite Construction, Inc. of Watsonville, California, one of the largest civil contractors in the United States.

The Las Vegas Monorail vehicles and signal systems were developed by Bombardier Transportation. The technology for the monorail vehicles came directly from the well-tested monorail systems running in Walt Disney World. Bombardier constructed Mark VI Monorail trains for the Walt Disney World Monorail System and for Las Vegas.

== Stations ==
Stations listed from north to south:

Name	Platform type	Coordinates	Photo
Sahara	Side	36.1423°N 115.1549°W	
Westgate	Island	36.1371°N 115.1530°W	
Convention Center	Island	36.1295°N 115.1544°W	
Harrah's & The Linq	Island	36.1188°N 115.1685°W	
Flamingo & Caesars Palace	Island	36.1160°N 115.1686°W	
Horseshoe & Paris	Island	36.1121°N 115.1674°W	
MGM Grand	Island	36.1024°N 115.1677°W	

== Rolling stock ==
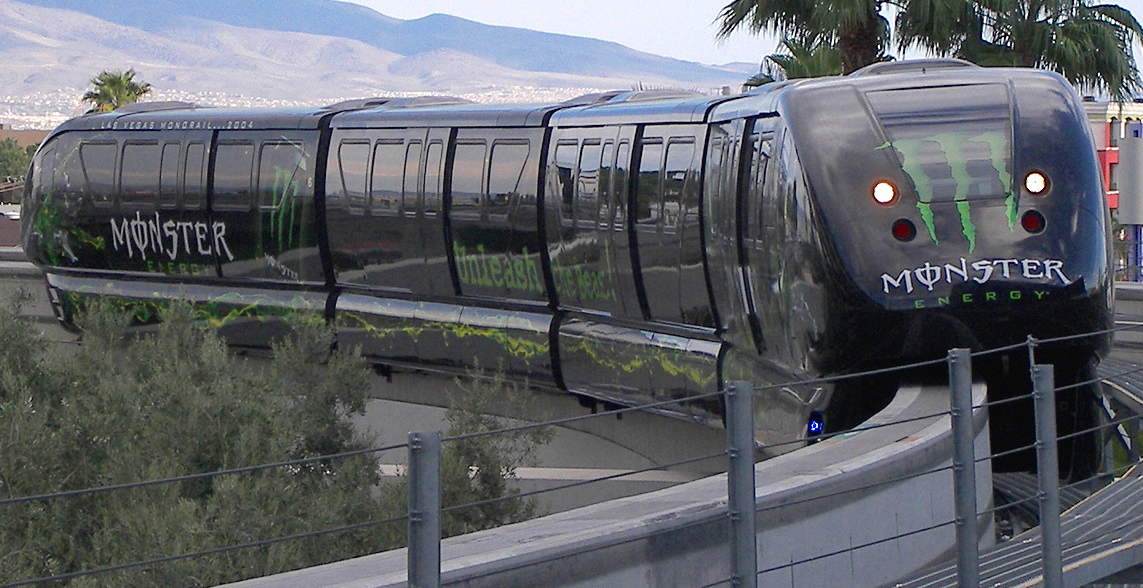
Bombardier MVI rolling stock

The monorail uses nine fully automatic Bombardier MVI trains, each consisting of four cars. These are very similar to the six-car Mark VI monorails at Walt Disney World (which were operated by pilots until 2014). The guideway is built to the "ALWEG" track standard. For the first seven years, the line only ran as the MGM Shuttle, between MGM and Bally's stations. During this time, two ex-Walt Disney World Mark IV monorail trains were used. Though the Las Vegas and related train equipment appear superficially similar to the original ALWEG design (as exemplified by the Seattle system), their suspension and propulsion systems differ substantially. A Seattle train may be walked end-to-end which is impossible on a Las Vegas or Florida train. The ALWEG Mark VI system used in Las Vegas Monorail consists of two inline large truck tires per car that support the load over the concrete guideway with a rectangular cross section and eight guide tires that straddle the guideway from both sides. The total capacity of the four-car trains is roughly equivalent to two articulated buses at 80 seated and 160 standing passengers. The maximum speed is 50 miles per hour (80 km/h), although that speed is only reached during one short straight segment of the line.

== Proposed extensions ==
=== Downtown Las Vegas extension ===
Phase 2, a 2.3-mile (3.7 km) long extension along Main Street to Downtown Las Vegas was planned, with new stations at the Stratosphere Hotel, Charleston Boulevard, Bonneville Avenue, and Main Street Station. Construction was planned to begin in 2005 with service starting in 2008. However, the anticipated funding from the federal government was not allocated in 2004, so the plans were put on hold. On January 27, 2005, the federal government announced that it would not provide money for the $400-million project.

The plan was to open the system in January 2004 and for it to cover its debts and operating expenses by attracting 19 to 20 million riders. Since the system was not only delayed in opening, but later shut down for four months, income was not as great as organizers had hoped. This reportedly is a contributing factor for the government's denial of Phase 2 funding.

=== Airport extension ===
Phase 2 was revised to instead extend the monorail system south from the MGM Grand Station to Harry Reid International Airport. Providing monorail service to the airport has been an unpopular idea with limousine and taxicab operators in the city, as trips to and from the airport form a major portion of their business. Several hotel and casino owners on the Strip supported the project, and were more supportive of an extension to the airport than one to downtown Las Vegas.

On December 7, 2006, Clark County commissioners granted permission for the proposed extension to Harry Reid Airport. Funding had not yet been identified.

On September 9, 2008, the monorail company provided details of the proposed expansion to the Las Vegas Convention and Visitors Authority board. The intended airport extension would begin at the new Terminal 3, with the first stop near Terminal 1, turn north on Swenson Street, then continue west on Tropicana Avenue before turning north at Koval Lane to meet up with the existing system behind the MGM Grand. This route was proposed to be built with private funds and would have added approximately four miles to the existing route, doubling the length of the system.

When the monorail company announced details of the extension in September 2008, the airport extension was to be built with private funds and was expected to be built by 2012. However, as of March 2011, the Las Vegas Monorail Company was still in the planning phases of the proposed extension to Harry Reid International Airport with a proposed stop on the UNLV campus.

The monorail company announced in May 2015 that it is proposing instead an extension to the Mandalay Bay Resort and Casino and an infill station at the Sands Expo & Convention Center. Subsequently, the Regional Transportation Commission of Southern Nevada announced that a new underground light rail system under the Las Vegas Strip, which would connect Downtown Las Vegas with the airport, is in the long-term planning phase.

=== Mandalay Bay extension ===
In March 2018, the Clark County Commission approved a proposed extension to Mandalay Bay, putting the monorail closer to Allegiant Stadium. The monorail company planned to start construction on the extension in June 2018 and have it completed by September 2020, in time for the completion of the stadium and Las Vegas Raiders inaugural season in Las Vegas. In November 2018 it was confirmed that two new Monorail stations would be built; one at Mandalay Bay and another at the Sphere with completion by 2021. In May 2019, lack of funding delayed the start of construction on a Mandalay Bay extension. As of March 2020, there is no timetable to begin construction on an extension nor a completion date

== See also ==
- RTC Transit
- List of monorail systems
- List of rail transit systems in North America

=== Resort trams ===
- Aria Express
- Mandalay Bay Tram
- Hard Rock-Treasure Island Tram
