= Mark IV monorail =

Monorail model built by Martin Marietta

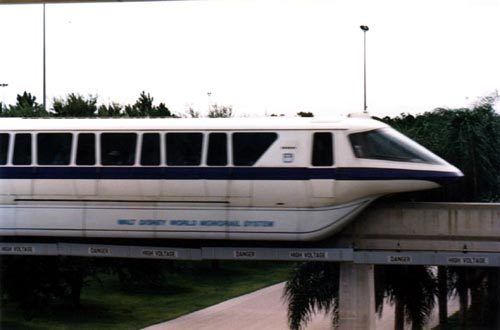
Mark IV monorail at Walt Disney World.

The Mark IV monorail (Mk4) was a straddle-type monorail train built for the Walt Disney World Monorail System. The design was developed by Disney Imagineer Bob Gurr. Ten trains were built by Martin Marietta in 1969 at the cost of about $650,000 (~$7.7 million in 2025 dollars) USD each and they were used on the monorail system between 1971 and 1989 before being replaced by the Mark VI monorail, although a few lasted until 1991.

As Walt Disney Productions finalized its plans for the Walt Disney World Resort in Florida, it was decided that monorails would be used as a primary means of transportation for the new “Vacation Kingdom." While the monorail system would not be as extensive as Walt Disney's original plans for the Florida site, it would still be the primary mode for transporting guests throughout the resort. Walt Disney envisioned the monorail as the transportation system of the future. To preserve the aesthetics of the resort and to separate the theme park from the outside world, the parking facilities for the Magic Kingdom were built nearly a mile across the 200–acre Seven Seas Lagoon creating one of the world’s largest park and ride operations. This would be the first Disney monorail system for necessary transportation rather than a ride in the park. Disney had nearly 10 years of experience with the Alweg monorails of Disneyland and designed the new monorails inspired by the look of the popular Lear jets. Disney Imagineer Bob Gurr designed the Mark IV trains, which were manufactured by Martin Marietta in Orlando, Florida with 10 trains originally built. When two additional trains were needed in the mid-1980s as attendance increased, Disney turned to Walt Disney Imagineering to build the additional units.

The trains originally had five cars (all Mark VI trains were introduced as 6-car units). With attendance skyrocketing in the mid-70s, Disney increased capacity and by late 1978 some trains were expanded to six cars. Expansion of the trains continued through the mid-1980s.

The Mark IV monorails were reliable workhorses with a 99.985% operational readiness and a low cost of $0.06 per passenger mile (PPM).

== Design ==
The Mark IV monorails were the first of the "Learjet" styled monorails used by Disney (long, sleek white trains with mid-level windows). The design was also used for the Mark V (Disneyland), Mark VI (WDW) and inspired the look of other systems such as the Las Vegas Monorail as well as systems in Asia. Each car featured brown interiors (seat material and carpet) with four double sided and two single (at the front and rear) bench seats which stretched the entire width of the car. The cars were accessed by doors which were automatically opened using a pneumatic system (a loud clunk would be heard and the doors would swing open at the press of a control button on the outside of the monorail near the driver door) and manually closed by a Cast Member (who would walk from one end of the train to the other with his hand out, pushing the doors shut as he walked by). Unlike the Mark VI trains in use at Disney World, Mark IV's were shorter, the cabins were somewhat narrower, and had no standing capacity; all passengers had to be seated. The trains were air conditioned and heated, and each window could be cracked open with a latch. The pilot's compartments (cabs) were not heated. Passengers in wheel chairs were boarded in the middle door of the third car. The door included an opposite hinged side that allowed the passenger to remain in their chair while boarding. Passengers in chairs were boarded using a metal ramp (the floor of the train was several inches higher than that of the station) and one bench seat folded up allowing the chair to be anchored securely for travel without inconvenience to the guest.

== Train identification ==
Each train was identified by a colored stripe and given a name according to that color. When Lime and Coral joined the fleet in 1984, to help visually distinguish Green from Lime and Pink from Coral, the Lime and Coral stripes had a delta (Δ) painted across doors 2 and 3 in the middle of each car. Monorail Lime deltas were painted a dark blue in homage to the original Walt Disney World monorail cast's costume colors (lime and blue). Coral's band included white deltas.

The complete list of train colors were:

- Red
- Blue
- Orange
- Gold
- Yellow
- Pink
- Green
- Silver
- Black
- Purple
- Lime^{Δ}
- Coral^{Δ}

An example of the Lime Delta

^ΔIdentifiable by their deltas.

During night operations, as pilots were unable to see the train stripe from a distance, to designate on which beam (line) the train was operating, the beacon lamps on top of the train were used. The beacon lamps were red or amber (a colored funnel cone was manually adjusted up and down in the housing to change the color of the light). The order of the colors advised other drivers on which beam or track the train was operating:

- Red front and rear was an Express Line (exterior) train;
- Amber front and rear was a Resort Line (lagoon) train;
- Red in the front and amber in the back was an Epcot Line train.

Due to the difficulty in distinguishing between red and amber at a distance, the Mark VI trains added a third color of green.

== Train operations ==
Doors on the train were opened by pressing buttons located next to the cab doors at either end of the train. Cast Members would stand next to the train as it entered and the driver would hold up fingers to indicate how many cars in which there were guests. A circle gesture indicated the train was fully loaded. The doors of each car could be opened independently. Buttons noted as 1, 2, 3, (3A on 6-cars), 4, 5 or there was an "A" (that would open all the doors). There was also an All button located on Car 3. In 1984 an "arming" button was added to prevent unintentional opening of the doors. Cast Members had to hold both the button activating the pneumatic system and the button or buttons for the desired cars they wished to open.

When Walt Disney World opened, there were only two lines—the Express Monorail (to/from the Magic Kingdom parking lot) and the Resort Monorail (which operated as local stopping at the Contemporary Resort, the Polynesian Resort, and the Magic Kingdom). Originally the Resort Monorail did not stop at the Transportation and Ticket Center (TTC) as it was intended for resort guests only. When Epcot opened in October 1982, the resort line began stopping at TTC to allow resort guests to board the Epcot Center Monorail. Conversely the Express Monorail (Magic Kingdom/parking lot) would not stop at the resorts except during the very busiest of times when the first car would not be loaded and the train would stop at the north end of the Contemporary to board hotel guests. When Express trains stopped to embark Contemporary guests, clearances were handled by radio dispatch.

When the resort opened in 1971, both beams operated in the same direction (clockwise—the direction the modern day resort line runs) and based visual clearances and off a standard block light system. Entrance to the Contemporary was only allowed upon receipt of radio clearance due to the inability of pilots to see other trains in the station. For safety reasons, this practice was discontinued by 1973. The Express Line began operating counter clockwise and a flashing white strobe light was added to the rear cab (non-operating end) as an indication of train position for approaching trains. A Moving Blocklight System (MBS), also known as the MAPO system (for Mary Poppins, profits from the film provided funding for the project, U.S. patent 3,973,746), was installed by the mid-1970s.

Having ten trains and two beams originally, it was seldom that all ten trains were in operation on the same day. Typical operations were three or four parking lot line trains and four resort trains (seven to eight total). During busy times there might be four trains operating on both tracks. This allowed for a rotation of units, have trains available in case of a breakdown, or to perform maintenance which took longer than overnight. When Epcot opened, the typical operation was three trains Epcot Center, three resort trains, and three to four parking lot trains. During the slower fall months, the operations might drop to two trains on Epcot Center, two to three resort trains, and three Express (parking) trains. With the introduction of trains 11 and 12 (Lime and Coral), a four-train operation on all beams was possible. If the Magic Kingdom was especially busy a train would be taken from resorts or Epcot to give the parking lot a five-train operation.

Switching (either moving from track to track or to/from Monorail Shop): When moving trains from one beam to another, other trains on both lines were required to hold outside of the block (or section) containing the switch. Trains being moved were emptied of guests and the entire process was controlled via radio between the switch beam operator (who stood under the switch), the train operator, and Monorail Base (the lead at TTC). At that time Monorail Base oversaw the entire system (Monorail Concourse later took over). The entire process was carefully coordinated and executed. To engage the train's motors during a switching operation, the pilot overrode the automatic anti-collision system throughout (MAPO) the entire switch. Speed through the switches was strictly limited to "nudging" (extremely slow) over most of the switches due to the degree of change; except for the Epcot switches where speed was limited to 15 miles per hour (24 km/h) (the Epcot switches are beam replacement style and have less degree of change). Drivers announced by radio when they had reached designated support pylons at various parts in the switching process. Whenever operationally possible, the switching operation was completed with the train moving in forward and the pilot occupying the cab which allowed him/her to see consistent with the forward operation. Occasionally a portion of the switching operation was completed in reverse. Because operating a train presents significant safety concerns, such operations were only conducted when other trains had been removed from the system and the entire process was supervised by additional personnel to ensure the train would not approach an open switch. Reverse operations with guests on board were prohibited except in extreme situations. Rather than operate a train in reverse with guests on board, having the train towed was preferred.

Procedural safety checks of the anti-collision systems were completed twice each day, when the trains were first placed in service and next between 2:00 and 3:00 p.m. Additional safety checks such as visually inspecting the carbon collector shoes were also performed each afternoon.

Each night as service shuts down, the trains were removed from the beams one route at a time. Usually the Magic Kingdom closed first, followed by Epcot and then the resort trains would cease operations around midnight. Typically the Express (parking lot) trains would "switch ends" (the driver would move to Cab 5) and operate the train in a clockwise direction. They would then be lined up with one at the west side of the switch beam (east of the Magic Kingdom, west of the Contemporary); one in the Magic Kingdom station; one at the top of the hill on the west side of the Magic Kingdom (north of the modern Grand Floridian); one at the Polynesian and, on the rare occasion when five trains were operating—one at TTC. The first train would be cleared through the switch, around behind Space Mountain, and into the Monorail Shop. Following trains would advance one by one forward to where the train in front of them previously had been stopped. This process continued until all the trains were berthed in the shop.

Once the exterior (Express Monorail) trains had reached Monorail Shop, the clearing of the Epcot Center line would begin. Trains would line up with one at the south side of the switch on the Epcot line (right where the beam turns south after leaving TTC); another train would leave the Epcot Center station and travel opposite of normal direction and hold at that plaza for the Magic Kingdom parking lot (making notification after crossing the bridge over the highway to the Epcot main entrance). The final train would leave TTC traveling counter clockwise (opposite of normal travel) completing the loop through Epcot Center to the Magic Kingdom parking lot plaza after the other trains had moved. If a train was to be left out overnight this train remained at TTC. The Epcot Center trains would travel through the switch on the Epcot mainline, travel the spur to the switch on the Express Monorail side and continue through to shop in the same way as the Express trains had done earlier.

Finally after midnight the resort trains would be sent to the shop. Trains would change direction and operate counter clockwise going down the hill from the Contemporary and through the switch between the Contemporary and Magic Kingdom, switch ends in the Magic Kingdom or TTC and line up in the same manner as express and Epcot trains had done earlier. The entire operation to remove the trains would take approximately 30 minutes per track.

Deploying trains for the operations of the day usually began around 5:30 a.m. when the trains assigned to the resort line were moved from shop to service. To allow sufficient downtime, for cleaning and maintenance typically these were the trains which had run Express or Epcot Center the day before. Epcot Center trains would deploy next followed by Express trains. The process of placing trains in service was essentially the reverse of the operations to take them out of service described above with the entire process taking less than two hours to get up to 12 trains out.

During special events such as Grad Nite or Night of Joy, monorail operations might be temporarily suspended. Rather than take the trains to Monorail Shop, the trains would be parked end to end in the Magic Kingdom or TTC stations with just the nose and the driver's door (enough so s/he could get out) in the stations, leaving most of the train outside the station. Station attendants were present to ensure the trains stayed in position.

To allow for maintenance access both the Magic Kingdom and TTC stations are discreetly built above ground which gives them bottom floor for maintenance activities. Skirts on the trains may be partially opened from these areas to make minor adjustments including replace a side tire, carbon collector shoe, or adjust an air conditioning unit. Compressors are located at each station which are attached to trains that are left out overnight.

== Train expansion ==
The system was originally designed and constructed upon the presumption the trains would eventually be extended. The Magic Kingdom as well as the Transportation and Ticket Center stations were originally built to accommodate longer trains. By the mid-1970s, attendance was exceeding expectations and it was decided to begin expanding the trains to six cars thus adding 40 additional seats per train (nearly 3,000 additional passengers per hour of operation).

Monorail Yellow was the first train expanded. Silver, Black, Purple and Pink soon followed so that by 1979 half of the fleet had been upgraded to 6-car units. The expansion program slowed until 1984 when attendance again began to swell. Monorail Yellow was briefly returned to five cars in 1984 to allow for structural testing of Car 3A (there were consideration of moving motors from other cars to Car 3A). In 1984 and spring 1985 Orange, Green, and Red were expanded to six cars. Yellow was also returned to her 6-car status. Lime and Coral were brought online as 6-car trains. Only Gold and Blue were never expanded to six cars. Disney had announced their intention to retire the Mark IV monorail trains and replace them with the Mark VI trains so there was no justification for the expense of expanding Gold and Blue. The Mark IV version of Monorail Blue was retired early and became a partial prototype for the Mark VI.

Originally the decor of Car 3A was brown matching the rest of the train. Sixth cars added during the 1980s (Yellow, Green, and Orange) were done in blue. When Red was expanded, Silver was remodeled following the fire of June 26, 1985, and Lime and Coral were launched—all six cars were adorned in blue interiors.

Train cars were numbered 1 to 5 with 1 and 5 being "cab" cars. To keep operations consistent, when the sixth car was added, the additional car was designated car "3A" (rather than 4 making the back end Car/Cab 6); that way pilot operations from the rear cab retained the "Cab 5" designation for all trains regardless of size (this practice continued until the Mark VI trains had fully replaced the Mark IVs at which time reverse motion was conducted as "Cab 6 Operation"). Car 3A did not include engines. Motors were eight units on each train: Axle #2 (back of Car/Cab1), front and rear axles of Cars 2, 3 and 4, along with axle #11 (back of Car/Cab 5).

By expanding the trains to 6-cars, there was an added benefit—their weight increased which helped to reduce speed on the Epcot Center mainline. Five-car train operations on the Epcot Center beam was rare. The 5-car trains were proven to easily exceed speed limits as they were some 22,500 pounds lighter than their 6-car sisters. Additionally, until the late 1980s when the Mark VI was introduced, the Resort Line was limited to 5-car trains. The stations at the Contemporary Resort and Polynesian Village were too short to accommodate a 201-foot 6-car train and had to be extended before the launch of the Mark VI.

== Monorail begin service dates ==
Train	In-service date
Monorail Orange	in service September 1, 1971, delivered April 5, 1971
Monorail Green	in service September 1, 1971, delivered May 20, 1971
Monorail Gold	in service September 1, 1971, delivered June 15, 1971
Monorail Blue	in service September 20, 1971
Monorail Red	in service November 7, 1971
Monorail Yellow	in service December 3, 1971
Monorail Pink	in service July 3, 1972
Monorail Silver	in service August 16, 1972
Monorail Purple	in service November 14, 1972
Monorail Black	in service December 22, 1972
Monorail Lime	in service May 12, 1984
Monorail Coral	in service August 25, 1984

== Specifications ==
Original ten trains built by Martin Marietta. Final two built by WDI.

Mark IV Monorail
Period of service	1971 to 1991
Length:	5 cars: 171 feet (52 m); 6 cars: 201 feet (61 m)
Width:	8 feet 10 inches (2.69 m)
Height:	11 feet 7 inches (3.53 m) (6 feet 6 inches (1.98 m) above top of beam)
Weight:	5 cars empty: 92,000 pounds (42,000 kg) 5 cars gross: 122,600 pounds (55,600 kg) 6 cars empty: 108,500 pounds (49,200 kg) 6 cars gross: 145,100 pounds (65,800 kg)
Passenger capacity:	5 cars: 40 per car + 4 in the nose = 204 seated 6 cars: 40 per car + 4 in the nose = 244 seated
Train performance:	Grade: 6% Acceleration: 3.0 ft/sec Deceleration: 5.0 ft/sec Direction: Reversible
Energy consumption:	Total system per year: 5,511,200 KWH Per train operating hour: 137 KWH Per train mile: 11.52 KWH Per passenger mile: .14 KWH
Propulsion and Braking:	Motors: 600 VDC 100 HP (8 per train) Controls: Manual, synchronized drive; cam controlled Braking: Dynamic and hydraulic disc Power collection: Replaceable carbon shoes (8 per train)

== Incidents ==
=== Valentine's Day 1974 accident ===
On February 14, 1974, Monorail Blue ran into the back of Monorail Red while it was exiting the Magic Kingdom station. At that time, operation was primarily by visual clearance; there was no train protection system to separate vehicles. Through a series of misjudgments and misinformation, Blue approached the station without proper clearance. The pilot was unable to stop Blue before rear-ending Red. The pilot of Blue was injured in the collision but recovered and transferred to the Watercraft Department after being cited at fault for the accident.

=== 1985 fire ===
On June 26, 1985, a fire engulfed the rear car of the six-car Mark IV Silver monorail train in transit from the Epcot station to the Transportation and Ticket Center. This fire predated on-board fire detection systems, emergency exits, and evacuation planning. The train stopped just short of the Epcot maintenance station (slightly north of the roadway bridge) when the fire shorted out the electrical connections under car 5 (the sixth car). Passengers in the car kicked-out side windows and climbed around the side of the train to reach the roof, walked down the roof towards Car 1 where they were subsequently rescued by the Reedy Creek Fire Department. It is widely believed two of the passengers were off-duty fire rescue men contributing to the safe evacuation and no loss of life. Seven passengers were hospitalized for smoke inhalation or other minor injuries. The fire department later determined that the fire started when a foam-filled, flat side tire was dragged across the concrete beam, heated due to friction, and ignited. Since the incident, nitrogen instead of air has been used to inflate monorail tires.

Immediately following the incident, pilots began riding in the inoperative cab to help monitor train status. Emergency roof access panels and hand rails were installed on all trains. By Labor Day 1985, Monorail Coral had been equipped with a fire detection system. With the arrival of the new Mark VI trains imminent, the system was not added to the other Mark IV trains.

== Retirement ==
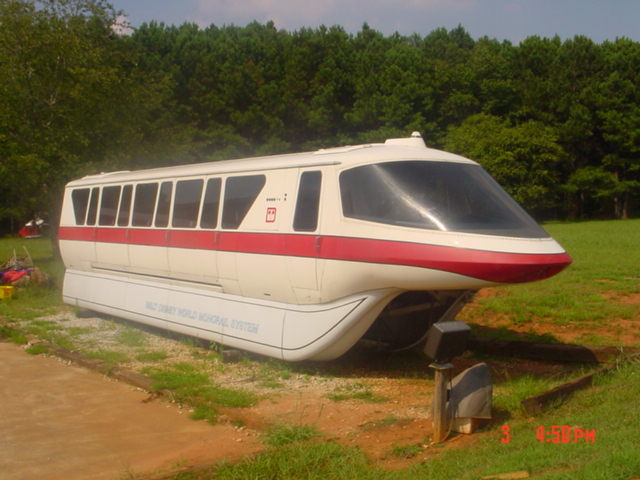
Mark IV Monorail Red in the front yard of Chip Young

With the introduction of the more reliable Mark VI trains in 1989, the Mark IVs were gradually phased out, with the last being retired in 1991.

Sometime between 1991 and 1994, Monorail Coral and Lime (which had been introduced new in 1984) were sold for $3.5 million each, refurbished, and used to begin the Las Vegas Monorail operations. In 2004, Lime and Coral (now the MGM and Bally) were replaced by fully automated Bombardier MVI 4-car trains.

When the Mark IV monorails were retired, most of the trains were scrapped. Monorail Red's first car was sold online to Chip Young of Georgia. It was later sold again on eBay and was on display at Mouse Surplus in Kissimmee, Florida until that business closed. Separately the rear cab pilot's chair and operating console from Monorail Red were sold on eBay.

== See also ==
- Rail transport in Walt Disney Parks and Resorts
