= Mark VI monorail =

Monorail model built by Bombardier Transportation

The Mark VI monorail (Mk6) is a monorail train used in the Walt Disney World Monorail System and the Las Vegas Monorail. The Mark VI started replacing the Mark IV monorails at Walt Disney World in 1989, replacing the final Mark IV by 1991. The Mark VI later replaced the two ex-WDW Mark IV monorail sets of the Las Vegas Monorail (then named the MGM Grand-Bally's Monorail) in 2004. The Las Vegas M-VI versions of the trains differ from the Walt Disney World trains in physical appearance and the fact that they are automated, a trait the Walt Disney World monorails lacked until their automation starting in 2014.

== Train specifications ==
- The trains were built by Bombardier of Canada for a reported cost of over $3.5 million per train.
- Each cab car is 40 ft 5 in (12.3 m) long and each intermediate car is 28 ft 2 in (8.6 m) long. The 6-car trains in the Walt Disney World Monorail System total 203 ft 6 in (62 m) in length.
- Each car can hold 20 seated passengers and 40 standing passengers.
- Cabs can accommodate up to six seated passengers in addition to the pilot. However the cab is inaccessible on the Las Vegas Monorail and passengers are prohibited in the cab in the Walt Disney World Monorail System after the July 5, 2009 accident.

== Design ==
=== Walt Disney World ===
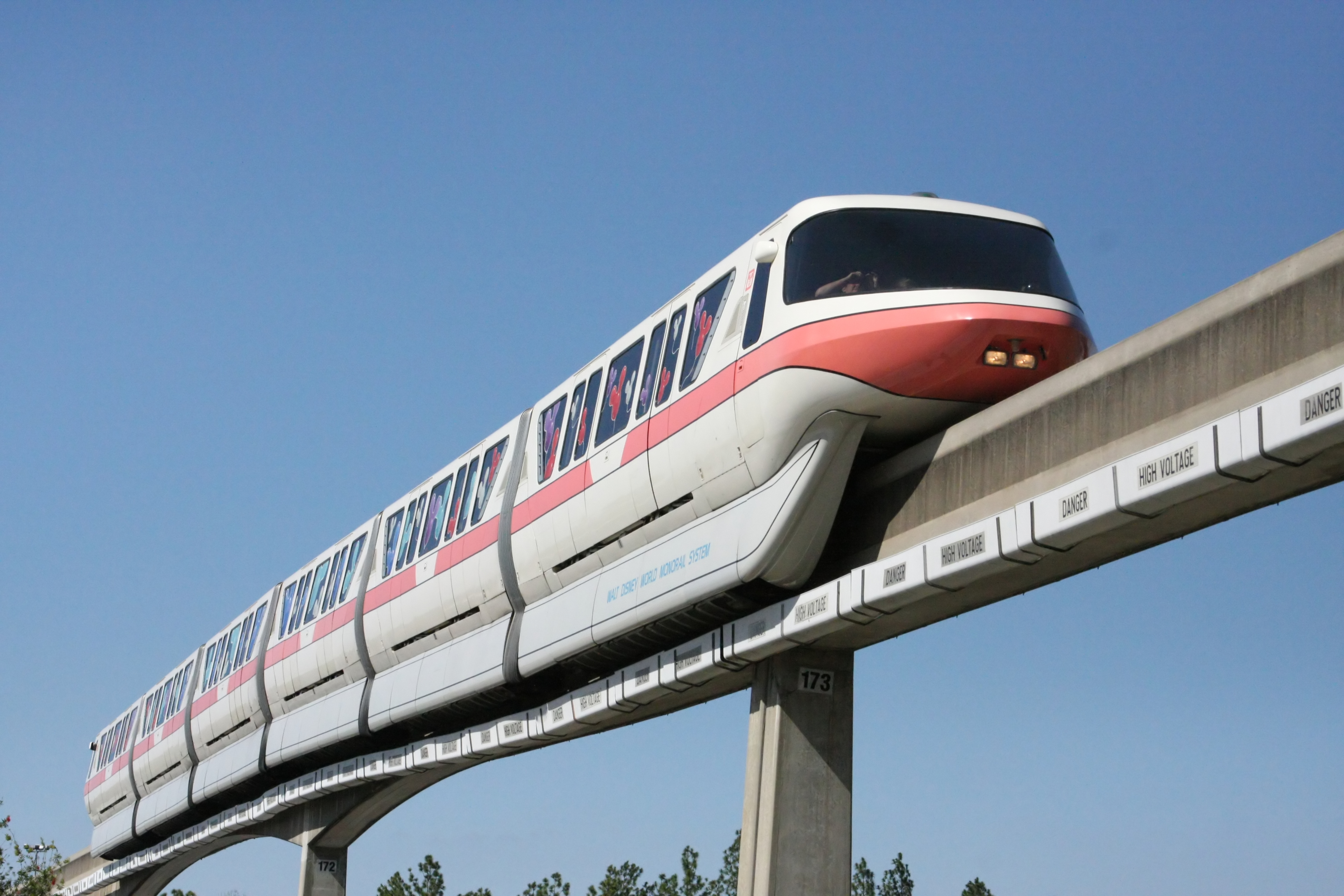
The WDW Mark VI Coral train in service on the Epcot beam in 2009

Like the previous Mark IV and Mark V (Disneyland) monorails, the Mark VIs at Walt Disney World are "Learjet" styled monorails (long, sleek white trains with mid-level windows). The interiors of the WDW Mk6 monorails featured grey interiors (seat material and carpet) with green bench seats which stretched the entire width of the car. There were also pink stripes located above the doors. After refurbishment, the monorail interiors were updated. The green seats were replaced with new grey ones, and the stripes and walls were changed to match the color of the corresponding monorail (i.e. Monorail Green received green stripes and walls).

Unlike the Mark IV, the Mark VIs were now accessed by automatic plug doors. There are four doors (two on each side) per car. While they still opened using a pneumatic system, they were now able to close automatically, eliminating the need for a Cast Member to walk from one end of the train to the other to manually close each door. Also unlike the previous Mark IV, Mark VI trains in use at Disney World are longer, the cabins are somewhat wider, and now contained standing room capability. Air conditioning and heating was also improved.

=== Las Vegas Monorail ===
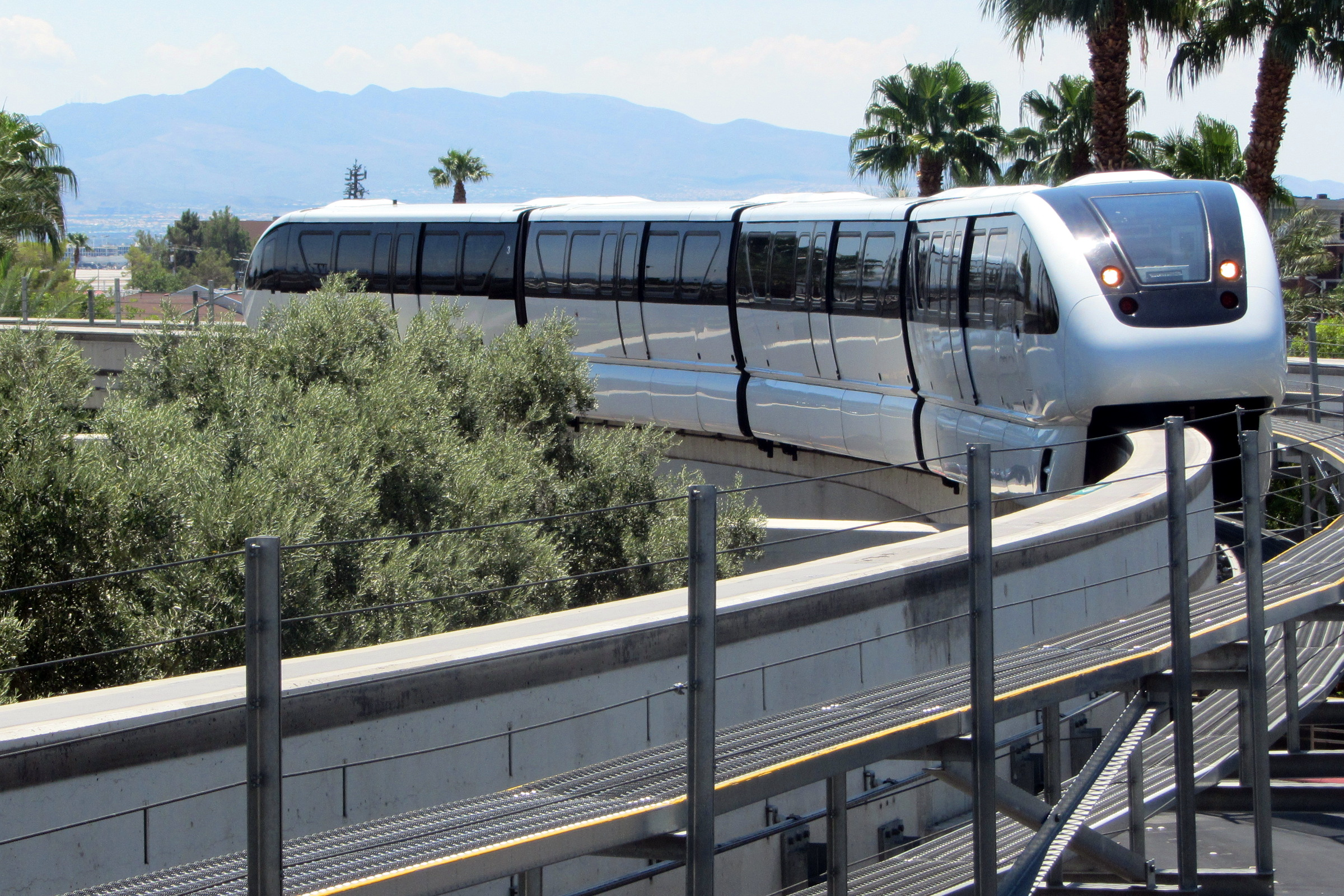
The Las Vegas Mark VI monorail in 2014

The Las Vegas monorail uses nine Mark VI trains. Although similar to their Walt Disney World counterparts, each Las Vegas MVI monorail is four cars long instead of six. The overall design is completely different. Instead of using a Learjet style, the cab ends resemble the later Innovia Monorail 300. There are only two pairs of sliding doors (one on each side) instead of the four sets of plug doors used on the WDW monorails. Inside, there are now seats that are located on the sides, allowing passengers to occupy an entire car, rather than a bench seat in the middle that prevents passenger from walking from one end to another. Each train is also painted the same black and white paint scheme, rather than with a color unique to a specific train; however the monorails are often wrapped with advertisements. The most significant difference between the Las Vegas MVI and Walt Disney World MVI is that the Las Vegas trains are driverless and fully automatic; therefore there are no pilots. The Walt Disney World trains were operated manually until 2014; however, pilots are still seated in the front cab to supervise the monorail in case of an emergency.

== Power ==
Each train has eight electric motors operating on 600 volts DC to produce 100 hp (75 kW) each. The motors also serve as brakes via dynamic braking and send power to resistor banks located between each car. Walt Disney World's trains have been fitted with a governor which limits their maximum speed to 55 mph (89 km/h); however, Disney regulations permit only 40 mph (64 km/h).

== Suspension ==

The Mark VI Suspension consists of a load tire and guide tires. The load tire is a Michelin XTE2 445/65R22.5 size tire, and rides along the top of the beam and provides traction for the movement of the monorail. The guide tires are just that; they guide the monorail on the beam. They are filled with nitrogen to help reduce the chance of fire in the event of tire failure.

== See also ==
- Rail transport in Walt Disney Parks and Resorts
