= List of spans =

The following is a list of spans, either used for overhead line crossings of rivers, sea straits or valleys, as antenna or for aerial tramways.

== Powerline spans in flat areas with high pylons ==
At these spans the sag of the conductors is less than the height of the pylons

Crossing	Country	City	Height of pylons	Span width [meter]	Height of conductors over ground	Year of inauguration	Notes
Jintang-Cezi Overhead Powerline Link	China	Jintang Island	380 m	2656	?	2019	Tallest transmission towers in the world
Zhoushan Island Overhead Powerline Tie	China	Damao Island	370 m	2700	?	2009	
Yangtze River Crossing	China	Jiangyin	346.5 m	2303	56 m	2004	
Amazonas Crossing of Tucuruí transmission line	Brazil	near Almeirim	295 m	2108	72 m	2013	Tallest transmission towers in The Americas
Yangtze River Crossing Nanjing	China	Nanjing	257 m	2053	?	1992	Tallest transmission towers in the world built of reinforced concrete
Pylons of Pearl River Crossing	China	Guangdong	253 m / 240 m	1547	70 m	1987	
Orinoco River Crossing	Venezuela	Caroní	240 m	1185 + 1060	?	1990	
Hooghly River Crossing	India	Diamond Harbour	236 m	1500	?		
345kV Han River River Crossing	South Korea	Goyang	195 m	1510	65m		
500 kV Yangtze River Crossing Wuhu	China	Wuhu	? m	1960	?	?	
HVDC Yangtze River Crossing Wuhu	China	Wuhu, Anhui Province	229 m	1910	?	2003	Tallest electricity pylons used for HVDC
Elbe Crossing 2	Germany	Stade	227 m	1200	76 m	1978	Tallest electricity pylons in Europe
Chūshi Powerline Crossing	Japan	Takehara	226 m	2357	?	1962	Tallest electricity pylons in Japan
Osaki Channel Crossing	Japan	Yoshina	223 m	2145	?	1997	
Overhead line crossing Suez Canal	Egypt		221 m	600	150 m	1998	
Huainan Luohe Powerline Crossing	China	Huainan	202.5 m	1478	?	1989	Pylons of reinforced concrete
Yangzi River Crossing of Xiangjiaba–Shanghai HVDC system	China	?	202 m	2718	?	2009	
Volga Crossing at Saratov Hydroelectric Station	Russia	Balakovo	197 m / 159 m	1603	?	1983–1984	Tallest electricity pylon in Russia and ex-USSR
Reihoku Crossing	Japan	Iwajima Island	195 m	1463	?	1993	
400 kV Thames Crossing	United Kingdom	West Thurrock	190 m	1372	76 m	1965	
Elbe Crossing 1	Germany	Stade	189 m	1140	72 m	1962	
Ob Crossing	Russia	Surgut	188 m	1584	?	1967–1968	61°14′24″N 72°52′30″E
Cruce Aereo canal de Chacao	Chile	Chiloe	180 m	2680	?	1990	
Tracy Saint Lawrence River Powerline Crossing	Canada	Tracy	176 m	?	?	?	Tallest electricity pylon in Canada
Île d'Orléans Saint Lawrence River Powerline Crossings South	Canada	Saint-Laurent-d'Île-d'Orléans	175 m	1585	53 m	?	
Doel Schelde Powerline Crossing	Belgium	Antwerp	172 m	1200m + 1000m	70 m	1974	
Sunshine Mississippi Powerline Crossing	United States	St. Gabriel, Louisiana	164.6 m	1130	?	1967	
Churchill River crossing	Canada	Labrador	?	1463	?	1971	
Bosporus overhead line crossing III	Turkey	Istanbul	160 m	1884	?	1999	
Cádiz Bay Crossing	Spain	Cádiz	158 m	1635	?	1960	
110 kV Yangtze River Crossing Wuhu	China	Wuhu	? m	1410	?	?	
Aust Severn Powerline Crossing	United Kingdom	Aust	148.75 m	1618	40 m	?	
132 kV Thames Crossing	United Kingdom	West Thurrock	148.4 m	?	76 m	1932	Demolished in 1987
300 kV Karmsundet Powerline Crossing	Norway	Karmsund	147 m	1050 m	54 m	1968/1979/1984	Three parallel 300 KV spans with east pylons at 143, 147 and 143 meters, west pylons 80, 90 and 92 meters. Spans are 1050, 924 and 879 meters respectively.
Limfjorden Overhead powerline crossing 2	Denmark	Raerup	141.7 m	797	?	?	
Saint Lawrence River HVDC Quebec-New England Overhead Powerline Crossing	Canada	Deschambault-Grondines	140 m	?	?	1989	Dismantled in 1992
Rhine Crossing Voerde	Germany	Voerde	138 m	516	?	1926	
Köhlbrand Powerline Crossing	Germany	Hamburg	138 m	597	?	?	
Bremen-Farge Weser Powerline Crossing	Germany	Bremen	135 m	648	?	?	
Ghesm Crossing	Iran	Strait of Ghesm	130 m	1585 + 1015	20 m	1984	2 pylons standing on a caissons in the sea
Oka River Crossing Dzerzhinsk	Russia	Dzerzhinsk	128 m, 70 m	990	?	1927–1929	Hyperboloid structure, abandoned
Tarchomin-Łomianki Vistula Powerline Crossing	Poland	Tarchomin/Łomianki	127 m (Tarchomin), 121 m (Łomianki)	963	?	?	
Enerhodar Dnipro Powerline Crossing	Ukraine	near Enerhodar	126 m	1350 + 1215	?	1984	3 pylons standing on a caissons in the reservoir;
Skolwin-Inoujście Odra Powerline Crossing	Poland	Skolwin/Inoujście	126 m (Skolwin), 125 m (Inoujście)	664	?	?	
Volga River Crossing of HVDC Ekibastuz–Centre	Russia	near Volsk	124 m	1740	?	1989–1991	
Bosporus overhead line crossing II	Turkey	Istanbul	124 m	1906	70 m	1983	
Île d'Orléans Saint Lawrence River Powerline Crossings North	Canada	Saint-Pierre-de-l'Île-d'Orléans	122 m	1280	?	?	
Duisburg-Wanheim Powerline Rhine Crossing	Germany	Duisburg	122 m	635	?	?	
Rhine Crossing Duisburg-Rheinhausen	Germany	Duisburg-Rheinhausen	118.8 m	570	?	1926	
Bullenhausen Elbe Powerline Crossing	Germany	Bullenhausen	117 m	666	?	?	
Lubaniew-Bobrowniki Vistula Powerline Crossing	Poland	Lubaniew/Bobrowniki	117 m	960	?	?	
Świeże Górne-Rybakow Vistula Powerline Crossing	Poland	Świeże Górne/Rybaków	116 m	1025	?	?	
Ostrówek-Tursko Vistula Powerline Crossing	Poland	Ostrówek/Tursko	115 m	880	?	?	
Bosporus overhead line crossing I	Turkey	Istanbul	113 m	1782	59 m	1957	
Bremen-Industriehafen Weser Powerline Crossing	Germany	Bremen	111 m	506	64 m	1972–1974	3-phase AC current
Bremen-Industriehafen Weser Powerline Crossing	Germany	Bremen	111 m	550	64 m	?	Single-phase AC current. Tallest pylons for single phase AC
380 kV Ems Overhead Powerline Crossing	Germany	Mark (south of Weener)	110 m	405	?	?	Rebuilt in 2007
Daugava Powerline Crossing	Latvia	Riga	110 m	?	?	1975	
Nowy Bógpomóż-Probostwo Dolne Vistula Powerline Crossing	Poland	Nowy Bógpomóż/Probostwo Dolne	111 m (Probostwo Dolne), 109 m (Nowy Bógpomóż)	1248	?	?	
Regów Gołąb Vistula Powerline Crossing	Poland	Regów/Gołąb	108 m	960	?	?	
Orsoy Rhine Crossing	Germany	Orsoy	105 m	545	?	?	
Emmerich Rhine Crossing	Germany	Emmerich	102 m	460	?	?	
Limfjorden Overhead powerline crossing 1	Denmark	Raerup	101.2 m	723	?	?	
Swine Powerline Crossing	Poland	Świnoujście	99 m	437	24 m	2009	Tubular steel pylons
Powerline Crossing Wittower Fähre	Germany	Wittower Fähre	95 m	840	?	?	
Reisholz Rhine Powerline Crossing	Germany	Düsseldorf	88 m	375	?	1917	
Strelasund Powerline Crossing	Germany	Sundhagen	85 m	440	?	?	
Rhine Crossing Düsseldorf/Neuss	Germany	Düsseldorf/Neuss	80 m	699	?	?	Powerline for traction current (single phase AC, 16.67 Hz, 110 kV)

== Powerline spans in mountainous areas requiring shorter pylons ==
At these spans, the pylons are situated on the tops of mountains, so the topography determines the height of the lines. Because of this it is possible that the span pylons can be lower than sag of the conductors.

Crossing	Country	Location	Height of pylons	Span width, leaning straight line [meter]	Span width, horizontal measurement [meter]	Height of conductors over ground	Year of inauguration	Notes
Ameralik Span	Greenland	Ameralik Fjord	18 m	5376 m	?	128 m	1993	
Sognefjord Span 1 (66 kV)	Norway	Sognefjord	13 m	4850 m	?	60 m	1956	
Sognefjord Span 2 (300 kV)	Norway	Sognefjord	15–22 m	4520 m	?	60 m	1967	
Sognefjord Span 3 (300 kV)	Norway	Sognefjord	18–20 m	4500 m	?	67 m	1975	
Langfjorden Span (132 kV)	Norway	Langfjorden	26 m	3973 m	?	55 m	1968	
Sunndalsfjorden Span (300/420 kV)	Norway	Sunndalsfjorden	19–24 m	3920 m	?	45 m	1972/2004	Two parallel powerlines. 8 cables, 2 reserve.
Pylons of Messina (150/220 kV)	Italy	Strait of Messina	232–232 m	3646 m	?	75 m	1955	Operation ended in 1994. Only the pylons remain. Mainland pylon is built on elevated ground 163 m above sea level.
Igaliku Span	Greenland	Igaliku Fjord	?	3599 m	2007?	63.4 m	?	
Kootenay Lake Crossing	Canada	Kootenay Lake	19 m (until 1962: 112 m tower at eastern shore)	3421 m (until 1962: 3248 m)	?	37 m	1952	large tower at eastern end destroyed by terrorist attack in 1962, replaced by higher-elevated small towers resulting in a longer span
Fjærlandsfjorden Span 2 (132 kV)	Norway	Fjærlandsfjorden	20–21 m	3350 m	?	330 m	1985?	
Hjørundfjorden Span (420 kV)	Norway	Hjørundfjorden	26–28 m	3270 m	?	70 m	2015	Replaced a 132 kV line in same position
Nordfjord Span 3 (420 kV)	Norway	Nordfjorden	25 m	3150 m	?	170 m	2015	
Saltery Bay Span	Canada	Powell River, British Columbia	? m	3100 m	?	? m	?	
Nordfjord Span 2 (132 kV)	Norway	Nordfjorden	11 m	3050 m	?	?	2015	
Fjærlandsfjorden Span 3 (420 kV)	Norway	Fjærlandsfjorden	25–30 m	3030 m	?	74 m	2016	Replaced a 132 kV line in almost same position
Holandsfjord Span (420 kV)	Norway	Holandsfjord	21 m	3020 m	?	228 m	1992	
Storfjord Span (420 kV)	Norway	Storfjorden	26–27 m	2970 m	?	69 m	2015	Replaced a 132 kV line in almost same position
Austefjord Span (420 kV)	Norway	Austefjorden	26–29 m	2950 m	?	151 m	2015	
Glomfjord Span (420 kV)	Norway	Glomfjorden	24–25 m	2950 m	?	51 m	1994	
Hardangerfjord Span (300 kV)	Norway	Hardangerfjord	18–20 m	2880 m	?	65 m	1968	3.5 km southwest of Jondal
Glomfjord Span (132 kV)	Norway	Glomfjorden	14 m	2830 m	?	42 m	1969	
Granvinfjord Span (420 kV)	Norway	Granvinfjord	26–30 m	2830 m	?	345 m	2013	Part of Sima-Samnanger line
Hellmofjord Span (420 kV)	Norway	Hellmofjord	25–26 m	2810 m	?	227 m	1987	
Holandsfjord Span (132 kV)	Norway	Holandsfjord	13 m	2690 m	?	64 m	1968	
Langenuen Span (300 kV)	Norway	Langenuen	30 m	2620 m	?	140 m	1982	
Fjærlandsfjorden Span 1 (66 kV)	Norway	Fjærlandsfjorden	12–15 m	2510 m	?	50 m	1950	
Lake Eildon	Australia	Eildon	?	2222 m	2222 m	40.5 m	?	
Osafjord Span (420 kV)	Norway	Osafjord	30–32 m	2220 m	?	540 m	2013	Part of Sima-Samnanger line
Hornindal Lake Span (420 kV)	Norway	Hornindal lake	24 m	2200 m	?	?	2015	
Fyksesund Span (420 kV)	Norway	Fyksesund	28–30 m	2070 m	?	?	2013	Part of Sima-Samnanger line
Nordfjord Span 1 (66 kV)	Norway	Nordfjorden	6–9 m	2030 m	?	60 m	1963?	
Tory Channel Crossing	New Zealand	Tory Channel	? m	2029 m	?	60 m	1982	Longest span in New Zealand.
Kobbefjord Span	Greenland	Kobbefjord	?	1912 m	?	63.4 m	1993	
Bjærangfjorden Span (132 kV)	Norway	Bjærangfjorden	13 m	2010 m	?	32 m	1968?	
Kangerlluarsuk Span	Greenland	Kangerlluarsuk	?	2005 m	?	23.5 m	?	
Tunulliarfik Span	Greenland	Tunulliarfik	?	2005 m	?	23.5 m	?	
Sansum Narrows HVDC Powerline Crossing	Canada	Sansum Narrows	? m	1900 m	?	?	1968	Part of HVDC Vancouver Island
Eyachtal Span	Germany	Höfen	70 m	1444 m	?	?	1992	Longest span of Germany
Enztal Crossing Calmbach	Germany	Calmbach	72.27 m (eastern end), 70.59 m (western end)	1372.65 m	?	?	1992	
Carquinez Strait Powerline Crossing	United States	Benicia	68 m + 20 m	1350 m	?	?	1901	
Künzelsau Kocher Valley Span	Germany	Künzelsau	67.03 m (southern end), 67.8 m (northern end)	995 m	?	?	?	
Nagold Valley Span	Germany	Bad Liebenzell	40 m (western end), 54 m (eastern end)	941 m	?	?	?	
Neckar Crossing Sulz	Germany	Sulz	61 m	891 m	?	?	1976	Powerline for traction current (single phase AC, 16.67 Hz, 110 kV)
Neckar Crossing Weitingen	Germany	Weitingen	61 m	864 m	?	?	1976	Powerline for traction current (single phase AC, 16.67 Hz, 110 kV)
Rhine Powerline Crossing Hirzenach-Oberkestert	Germany	Hirzenach/Oberkestert	? m	734 m	?	?	?	
Wiesensteig Fils Valley Crossing	Germany	Wiesensteig	47 m (northern end), 52.52 m (southern end)	725 m	?	?	1954	

== Antenna spans across valleys ==
Crossing	Country	City	Height of pylons	Span width, leaning straight line	Span width, horizontal measurement	Height of conductors over ground	Year of inauguration	Notes
Herzogstand Radio Station	Germany	Kochel am See	0	2700 m	2580 m	?	1920	sloping antenna anchored to rock; dismantled in 1934
Jim Creek Naval Radio Station	U.S.	Oso, Washington	61 m	?	2500 m	?	1953	
Omega transmitter Bratland	Norway	Bratland	?	3500 m / 3300 m	?	?	1966	dismantled
Omega transmitter Trinidad	Trinidad	?	?	?	?	?	?	dismantled
Omega transmitter Haiku	U.S.	?	?	?	?	?	?	dismantled
Malabar Radio Station	Indonesia	?	?	?	?	?	?	dismantled
Noviken VLF Transmitter	Norway	Gildeskål Municipality	?	2375 m	?	?	?	VLF-transmitter
ICV-transmitter on Tavolara, Span 1	Italy	Tavolara	133 m/114 m	?	1000 m	?	1962	VLF-transmitter
ICV-transmitter on Tavolara, Span 2	Italy	Tavolara	133 m/114 m	?	1100 m	?	1962	VLF-transmitter
ICV-transmitter on Tavolara, Span 3	Italy	Tavolara	133 m /<100 m	?	1100 m	?	1962	VLF-transmitter
3SA-transmitter	China	Changde		?	2470 m	?		VLF-transmitter with multiple spans
Portofino transmitter	Italy	Portofino	130 m / 5 m	?	590 m	?	?	Mediumwave broadcasting antenna fixed on span

== Aerial tramways ==
Tramway	Country	City	Height of pylons	Span width, leaning straight line	Span width, horizontal measurement	Height of cable over ground	Year of inauguration	Notes
Zugspitze Cable Car	Germany	Garmisch-Partenkirchen	127 m	3213 m	?	?	2017	Constructed by Doppelmayr Garaventa Group
Kitzsteinhorn Cable Car	Austria	Kaprun	113.6 m	?	?	?	1966	?
Peak 2 Peak Gondola	Canada	Whistler	65 m	3024 m	3019 m	436 m	2008	3S Aerial Tramway constructed by Doppelmayr
Aiguille du Midi	France	Chamonix	none	2867 m	2500 m	?	1955	2nd Section
Vallee Blanche Aerial Tramway	France	Mont Blanc	none	2831 m	2830 m	appr. 300 m	1958	Rock anchored support structure; main span is almost horizontal
Pic du Midi - Taoulet cable car	France	Pic du Midi de Bigorre	none	2628 m	2580 m	?	1998	
3S Aerial Tramway	Austria	Kitzbühel	0 m, 80 m	2507 m	?	400 m	2004	
Sandia Peak Tramway	USA	Albuquerque	70.7 m, 21.33 m	2353 m	?	274 m	1966	
Vanoise Express	France	Vanoise	none	1850 m	1800 m	380 m	2003	
Black Angel Ropeway	Greenland	Maamorilik	none	? m	1220 m	18 m		
Dongo gondola	Hungary	Sárospatak	none	?	1036	Appr. 155 m	2014	Constructed by Tatrapoma
Feldmoos-Chli-Titlis Aerial Tramway	Switzerland	Titlis	37.6 m	(3476,2 m)	?	?	1979	Temp. site tramway, demolished in 1986

== Rope Tyroleans ==
Tyrolean	Country	City	Height of pylons	Span width, leaning straight line	Span width, horizontal measurement	Height of cable over ground	Year of inauguration	Notes
Tyrolienne Millau 2013	France	Millau	N/A	2 163 m	2 131 m	170 m unloaded rope	2013	Longest tyrolean with caving ropes from May 2013. Crossing residential zones, main road, 20 kV powerline. Near to Viaduc de Millau
Tyrolean	Bulgaria	N/A	N/A	1 594 m	1 550 m	N/A m	2008	Longest tyrolean with caving ropes from October 2008.
Tyrolienne Pierre Rias	France	Vercors	N/A	1 122 m	1 096 m	Mini 35 m	2008	Longest tyrolean with caving ropes before October 2008, calculated and built by Speleo Secours Français
Velky Traversz	Slovakia	Zadiel Gorge	N/A	850 m	847 m	320 m	1996	Previous longest tyrolean with caving ropes
Tyrolienne MJC Rodez	France	Rodez	N/A	800 m	795 m	around 80 m	2010	Longest tyrolean in urban site with caving ropes

== Other ==
Name	Country	City	Height of pylons	Span width, leaning straight line	Span width, horizontal measurement	Height of cable over ground	Year of inauguration	Notes
Star of Moustiers-Sainte-Marie	France	Moustiers-Sainte-Marie	N/A	227 m	?	250 m	?	
Straussee Ferry	Germany	Strausberg	9.7 m/ 9.6 m	370 m	370 m	5.8 m	1915	Longest span used for direct power supply of a vehicle
Oberndorf Aircraft Barrier	Germany	Oberndorf am Neckar	N/A	1000 m	1000 m	?	1942	2 spans across Neckar Valley, at which in a distance of 20 metres ropes with weights were fixed in order to protect Mauser works from air raids, dismantled in 1945
Bayer Cross Leverkusen	Germany	Leverkusen	118 m	56 m	56 m	?	1958	Illuminatable logo of Bayer company, spun between two rooftop towers
Rosary of Sanctuary of Our Lady of Lourdes and Praise	Brazil	Ituporanga	40 m		12 m	?	2022	Largest rosary of the world, spun between two towers

== See also ==
- List of longest suspension bridge spans
- List of longest cantilever bridge spans
