= Peak 2 Peak Gondola =

Gondola lift connecting two ski areas in British Columbia, Canada

Coordinates: 50°04′10″N 122°56′45″W

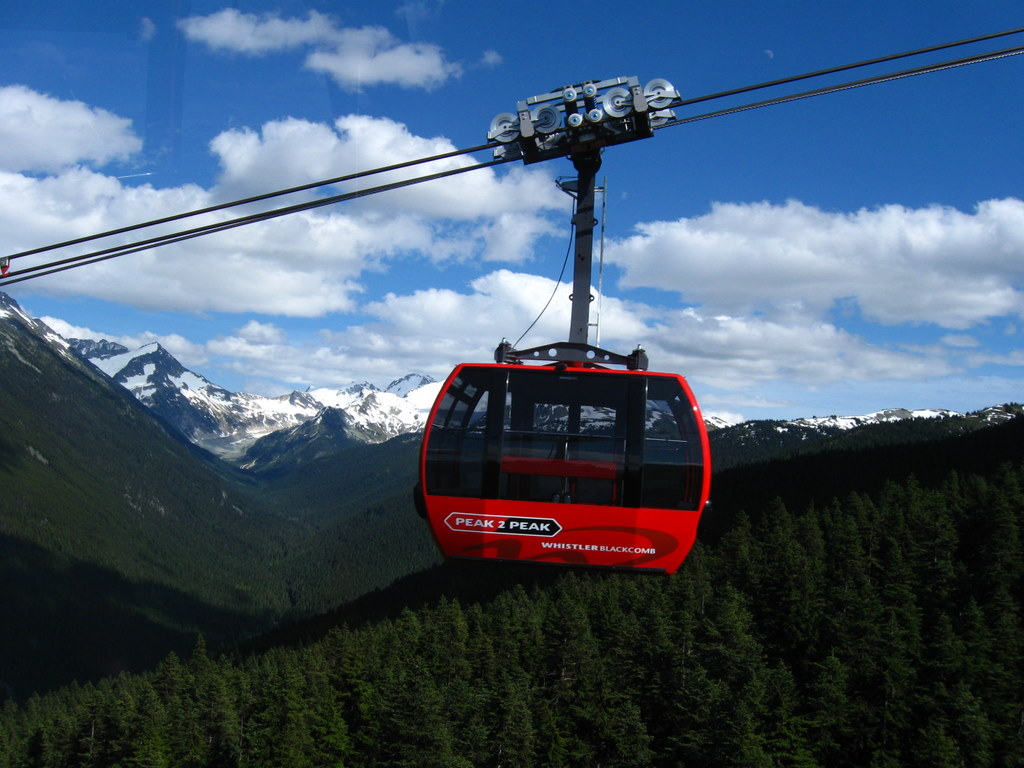
One of the 28 cabins on the Peak 2 Peak Gondola

The Peak 2 Peak Gondola is a tricable gondola lift at Whistler Blackcomb Resort in Whistler, British Columbia, linking Whistler Mountain's Roundhouse Lodge with Blackcomb Mountain's Rendezvous Lodge. It is the first lift to join the two side-by-side mountains. It held the world record for the longest free span between ropeway towers at 3.03 kilometres (1.88 mi) until 2017 when the Eibsee Cable Car exceeded it by 189 metres (620 ft). It is still the highest point above the ground in a gondola at 436 metres (1,430 feet), although a temporary aerial tramway in Switzerland used between 1979 and 1986 had larger span. The gondola was built by the Doppelmayr Garaventa Group in 2007 and 2008 at a cost of CDN$51 million. The Gondola is the first Doppelmayr "3S" tri-cable lift in North America; there are six similar but smaller lifts in Europe which were built in 1991, 1994, 2002, 2004, 2010, and 2024 in Switzerland, Austria, France and Germany. Whistler Blackcomb promotes the gondola as an attraction and uses it to transport skiers in the winter months, as well as sightseers year-round.

== History and planning ==
Whistler Mountain was opened by the Garibaldi Lift Company in 1965 and Blackcomb opened under separate ownership in 1980. It was not until 1997 when Intrawest, the owner of Blackcomb Mountain, bought Whistler Mountain and brought both mountains together on a single lift ticket. Ever since, some skiers wanted a way to be able to ski both mountains in one day without having to ski down to the village and ride multiple lifts to get back to the alpine. In 1997, Whistler-Blackcomb's Director of Mountain Operations, Hugh Smythe, and Paul Mathews, president of Ecosign Mountain Resort Planners, took a trip to Zermatt, Switzerland. After seeing the number of lifts connecting resorts around the Matterhorn, they got the idea of connecting Whistler and Blackcomb Mountains with a ropeway.

A number of problems prevented a connection for years. Fitzsimmons Creek and the steep faces on either side were unsuitable as ski terrain and are protected land. A traditional chairlift or gondola would have had to go all the way down one mountain, across Fitzsimmons Creek, and up the other side, resulting in a long lift ride and environmental impacts. A gondola that could cross the valley without going to the bottom was the best option. Whistler-Blackcomb had to consider the extremely high cost of building such a lift. The resort conducted research that indicated 92% of winter visitors and 86% of summer visitors would use the gondola at least once. HSBC Bank Canada and Scotia Capital agreed to provide Intrawest with financing for the project, allowing it to move forward.

Intrawest announced the gondola project to employees and the Resort Municipality of Whistler's Council on September 19, 2005, and held a community open house shortly thereafter. At the time, construction was expected to start in the summer of 2006 and continue for 2 years for an opening for the 2007-2008 ski season. On March 30, 2006, it was announced that construction would be delayed by one year. Whistler Blackcomb announced on April 17, 2007, that groundbreaking would occur in May 2007.

== Construction ==
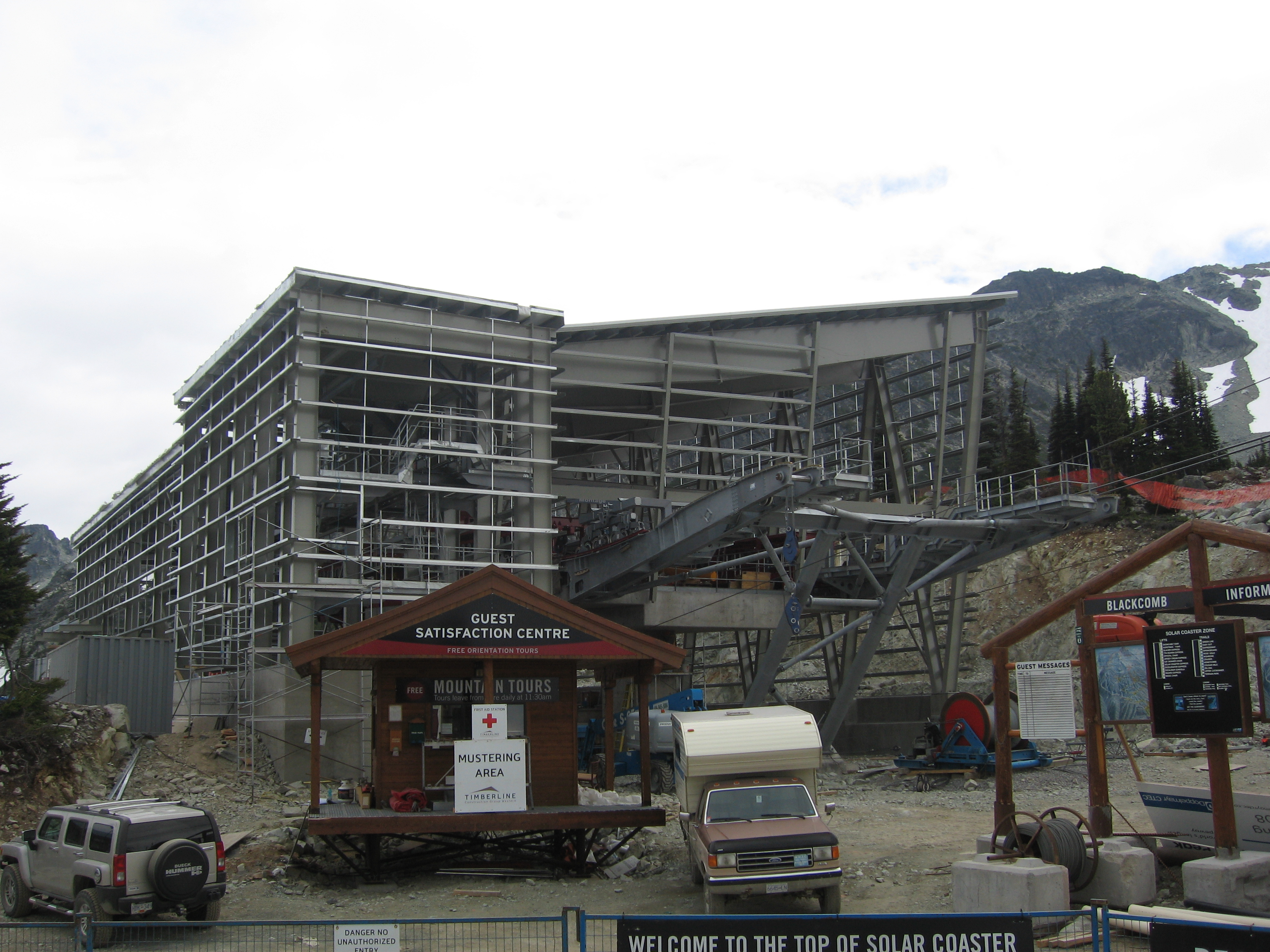
The Peak 2 Peak Gondola's Blackcomb Terminal under construction in July 2008.

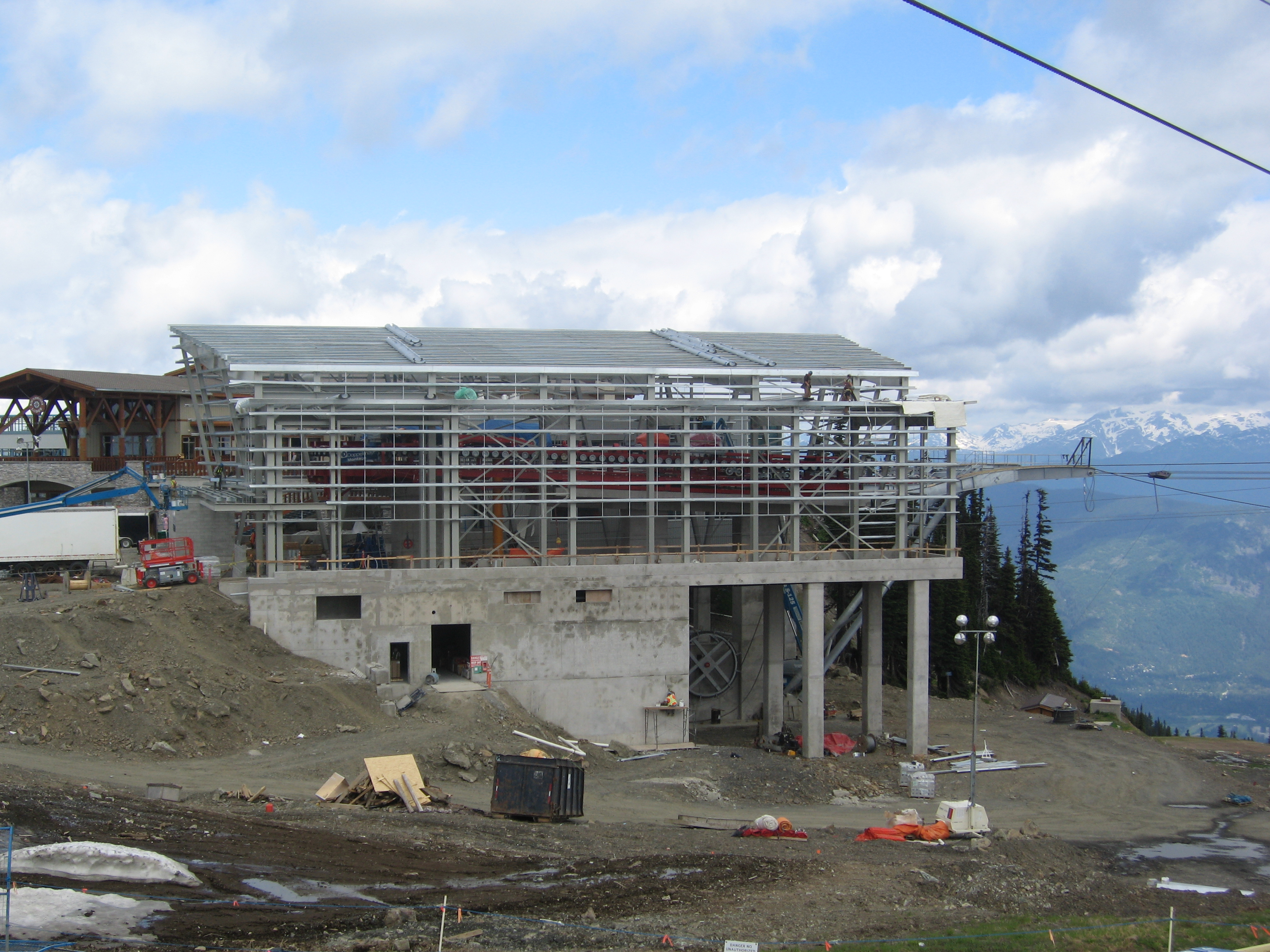
The Peak 2 Peak Gondola's Whistler Terminal under construction in July 2008.

Whistler Blackcomb broke ground for the Peak 2 Peak Gondola in a ceremony on May 21, 2007. The Doppelmayr Garaventa Group would supply the gondola itself, with Timberline Construction as the general contractor and Glotman Simpson as the Consulting Engineers. Fatzer AG of Switzerland would supply the four track cables and one haul rope that would carry the gondolas across the valley while CWA, also of Switzerland, would build the 28 gondola cabins.

80 workers from Whistler Blackcomb, Doppelmayr Garaventa, Timberline Construction and North Construction worked throughout the summer of 2007. Work completed on the Blackcomb side by that summer included the relocation of the top terminals of the Solar Coaster Express and Catskinner chairlifts on Blackcomb, excavation of both terminal locations, foundations for both terminals, foundations for all four intermediate towers, and steel erection of towers 2 and 3. Construction stopped for the winter in November 2007.

During the winter, the remaining two gondola towers and each terminal's machinery were built at the Garaventa factory in Goldau, Switzerland and the Doppelmayr factories in Wolfurt, Austria and Saint-Jérôme, Quebec. Fatzer AG manufactured the four track cables and haul rope that would suspend the gondola cabins. The five spools of cable left Europe by ship on April 10, 2008. By the time construction started again in the spring of 2008, ten feet (three point zero metres) of snow still covered the mountains and concrete had to be transported up the mountain by helicopter. Towers 4 and 1 were completed in early spring using mobile cranes.

The five cables arrived in the Port of Vancouver, Washington, USA on June 9 and were shipped to Whistler via train, arriving on June 16. Vancouver, Washington was used because it owns the largest mobile harbour crane on the West Coast of North America. To handle the 90-tonne reels, a German-made Goldhofer heavy-haulage trailer and tractor made its way from Montreal, QC to Whistler to take care of the transport from the train yard up the mountain. The Goldhofer trailer has four sections with six axles, and each axle having eight wheels. The trailer also features a hydraulic sliding system, which enabled the reels to be unloaded from the railcars in Whistler without a crane. Since there is no crane to lift each reel onto the truck, this trailer features sliding steel plates that essentially scoop the load from the train and set it onto the trailer deck. The five cables were trucked up Blackcomb Mountain for pulling across the valley starting June 19. Their entire 18,000-mile (29,000 km) journey from Switzerland to the top of Blackcomb Mountain was coordinated by OmniTrans Corporation.

Each track cable was winched down Blackcomb Mountain to the valley floor, then up Whistler Mountain. While the cables were pulled for twelve straight weeks, terminal construction continued with the gondola machinery being mounted on concrete foundations. The drive terminal on Whistler Mountain had the gondola's motors installed in an underground vault. After the gondola machinery was installed, steel enclosures were constructed and covered with a blue, translucent material.

On August 29 and 30, the two ends of the haul rope were spliced together in a 220-foot (67 m) braid to form a continuous loop that could pull the cabins. The splice was performed by Norm Duke of Wyoming, who is one of only a few splicers in North America. The splicing process took 14 workers from Whistler-Blackcomb and Doppelmayr Garaventa over 15 hours to complete. The 28 sky cabins arrived in Whistler starting on August 26. The first twelve cabins crossed the span on September 19, 2008 with a single Doppelmayr engineer, Mathias Zudrell, aboard. The remaining cabins were put on line and the system underwent extensive testing until its Grand Opening on December 12, 2008.

== Criticism ==
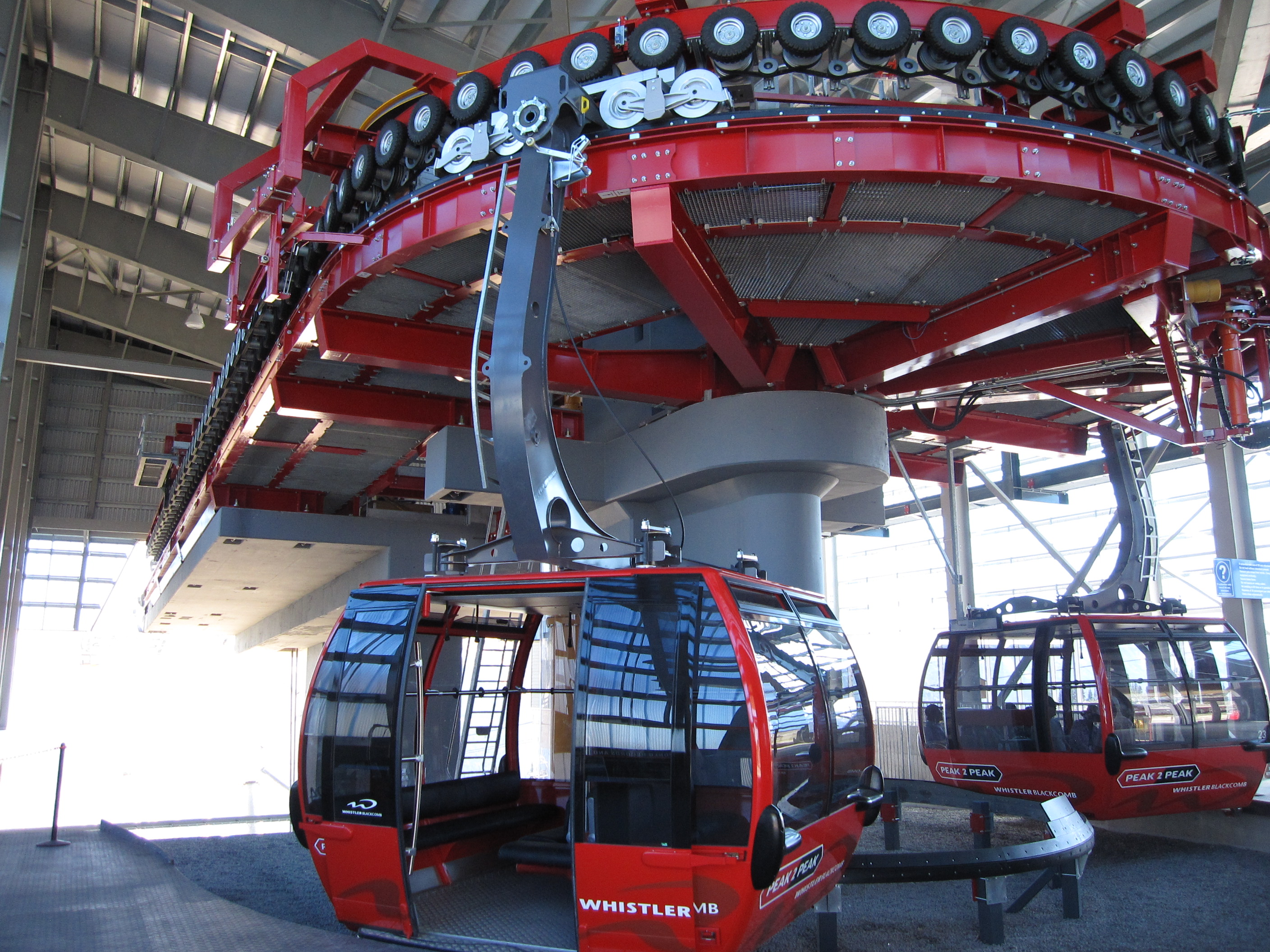
Inside the Peak 2 Peak Gondola's Blackcomb Terminal

The impact of such an expensive project on lift ticket prices was always a concern, especially because the gondola would not open any new ski terrain. When the project was announced in 2005, residents were promised that Peak 2 Peak access would be an optional add-on to a lift ticket or season pass. In a 2005 open house, the resort estimated the additional cost on a season pass would be CDN $59. At the time, Whistler-Blackcomb was attempting to secure a tax exemption from the Resort Municipality of Whistler for the increased assessments caused by the new terminal buildings. When season pass prices were announced for the Peak 2 Peak's inaugural season in August 2008, only early bird passes were allowed to decline the Peak 2 Peak option. Whistler Blackcomb said it was "not specific" about the Spirit Pass when it had said the Peak 2 Peak access would be optional.

In May 2007, Whistler Blackcomb announced the naming rights to the gondola were for sale for an undisclosed price, however the gondola has retained the Peak 2 Peak name.

== Features ==
=== Statistics ===
- Length: 4.4 km/2.73 mi
- Capacity: 4,100 people per hour
- Line Speed: 7.5 metres per second (16.8 miles per hour)
- Ride Time: 11 minutes

=== Cables ===
The cables were manufactured by Fatzer AG, a Swiss company that develops, manufactures and markets wire ropes worldwide. The Peak 2 Peak cables include four stationary track ropes, two in each direction, which act like railroad tracks for the cabins. Each track rope weighs approximately 90 metric tons (89 long tons; 99 short tons). There is a single haul rope which moves in a continuous loop and pulls the cabins. This cable weighs more than 80 metric tons (79 long tons; 88 short tons). There are a total of 26.5 kilometres (87,000 ft) of cable on the Peak 2 Peak Gondola.

=== Terminals ===
The Peak 2 Peak Gondola terminal buildings are the two largest lift terminals in the world. To create the concrete footings, platforms, masts, and columns, 4,000 cubic metres (5,200 yd^{3}) of concrete had to be trucked and helicoptered up the mountains. The 12,000-square-foot (1,100 m^{2}) Whistler terminal, which houses the drive motors and backup engines in an underground vault is 26 metres (85 feet) wide and 42 metres (138 feet) long and has 228 tonnes of steel. The 14,000-square-foot (1,300 m^{2}) Blackcomb Terminal is 26 metres (85 feet) wide and 48 metres (158 feet) long and contains 279 tonnes of steel. The Blackcomb terminal can house 15 cabins, the Whistler terminal 13 cabins in a cabin parking area when the system is not in use.

=== Towers ===
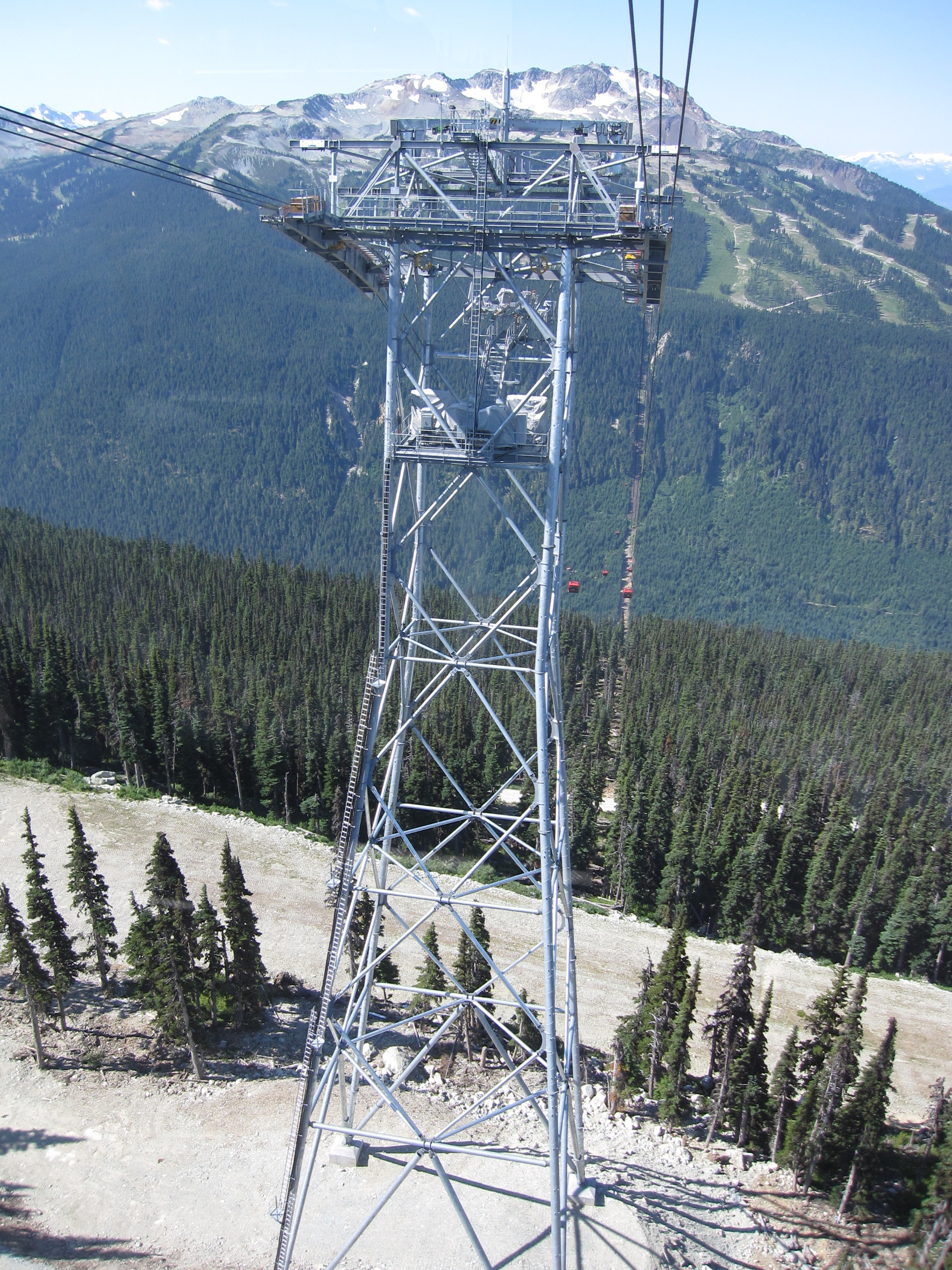
The second tower on the Blackcomb end of the gondola

There are four intermediate towers, two on Whistler Mountain and two on Blackcomb Mountain that support the cables, which range in height from 30 to 65 metres (98 to 213 ft). Combined, they contain 400 metric tons (390 long tons; 440 short tons) of steel.

=== Cabins ===
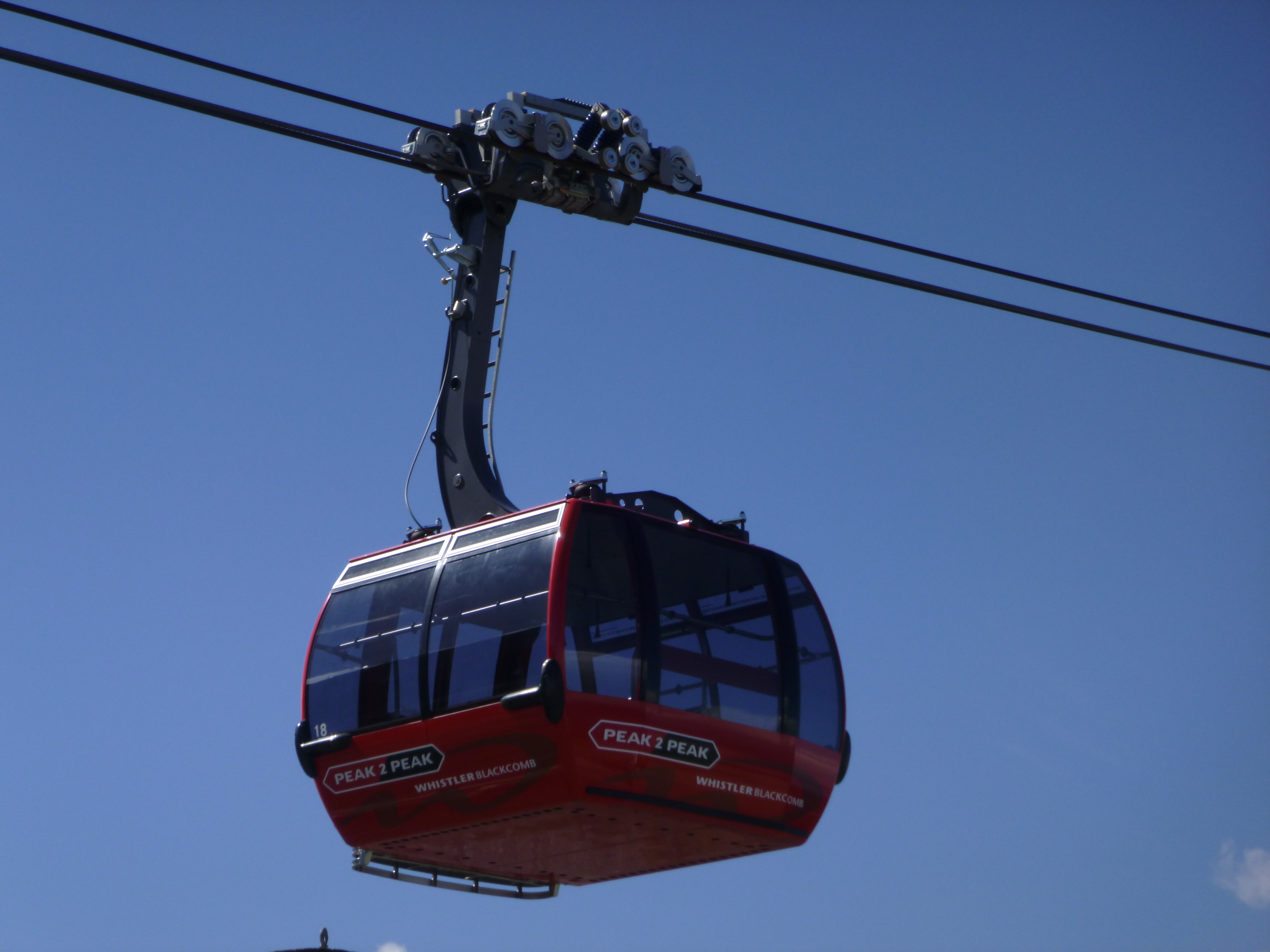
One of the 28 carriers on the Peak 2 Peak Gondola

The 28 CWA-manufactured gondola cabins hold 28 people each, with 22 seated and 6 standing. Twenty-six of the cabins are painted red and white, while the remaining two are painted blue, and have glass floors.

=== Safety systems ===
The Peak 2 Peak Gondola has a number of unique safety systems beyond what a normal ski lift features. The gondola has high wind stability and is designed to operate in winds up to 80 kilometres per hour (50 mph). Whistler-Blackcomb has called the Peak 2 Peak Gondola the most wind tolerant lift on Whistler Blackcomb. Testing at other Doppelmayr 3S installations have measured sustained winds at 120 kilometres per hour (75 mph) with no decrease in performance.

The lift is powered by an electric motor on Whistler Mountain; however an auxiliary diesel engine can take over in the case of primary engine failure or if there is a power outage. The lift also has a redundant braking system. Both bullwheels have emergency brakes to stop the gondola if there is a primary braking system failure.

In the event of a catastrophic failure, an evacuation can be performed. For cabins that are near the terminals, passengers are lowered down by rope from the cabins. For cabins that are too high off the ground for a rope evacuation, cabins are winched along the track cables to towers 2 and 3 where passengers are then lowered to the ground by rope by Ski Patrol members.

In addition, the gondola is equipped with a state of the art Obstacle Collision Avoidance System that uses radar to alert aircraft of the gondola as an obstacle. Strobe lights and loud noises over all radio frequencies are used to alert pilots who come too close to the gondola.

== In the media ==
The grand opening ceremony on December 12, 2008 featured Steve Podborski as emcee and Red Bull Air Force members BASE jumping from the middle of the gondola.

The Peak 2 Peak Gondola was the subject of a 2009 Discovery Channel documentary. Crews began filming the project during groundbreaking in May 2007. The documentary aired at 9 pm on December 23 and at 2 am on December 24, 2009, on Discovery Channel Canada. It was titled "Peak 2 Peak: Building the Worlds Biggest Gondola". The gondola was also featured in the History Channel's show Modern Marvels in the episode "Winter Tech", which showed the technology behind the Vancouver 2010 Winter Olympic Games.

On February 6, 2014, Graham Dickinson carried out an illegal BASE jump from the highest point of the Peak 2 Peak Gondola and landed safely in the valley below. In order to exit the gondola, Dickinson and a female accomplice (Kathleen Adams) had to pry open the doors causing an estimated $10,000 worth of damage. They posted a video of the jump on YouTube as a tribute to Shane McConkey. On February 13, 2014, the RCMP announced that they had arrested the woman and recommended charges of obstruction and mischief over $5,000. One day later, professional skier and BASE jumper Mike Douglas condemned the stunt saying "This guy seems to have gone about it in all the wrong ways. He caused a lot of damage in the process which I think is not cool."

== See also ==
- List of spans
