= Bosporus overhead line crossings =

Transmission-line crossings of the Bosporus strait in Istanbul, Turkey

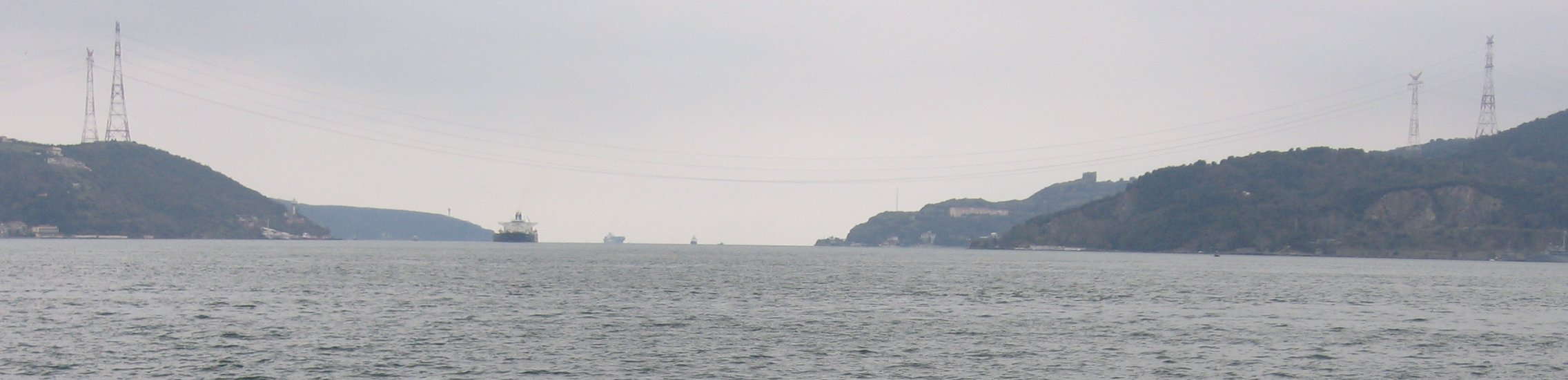
From Kireçburnu

Bosporus overhead line crossings refers to the three transmission line crossings of the Bosporus, the strait in Istanbul, Turkey.

== 154 kV Vaniköy-Etiler ==
The Bosporus overhead line crossing 1 was the first overhead transmission line crossing the Bosporus. It was inaugurated in 1957 and it is designed and operated for two 154 kV circuits. Although apparently designed for overhead ground wires, none are currently present. The span width is 1,782 m (5,846 ft), clearance over Bosporus is 59 m (194 ft). The pylons carrying this span are 113 metres tall.

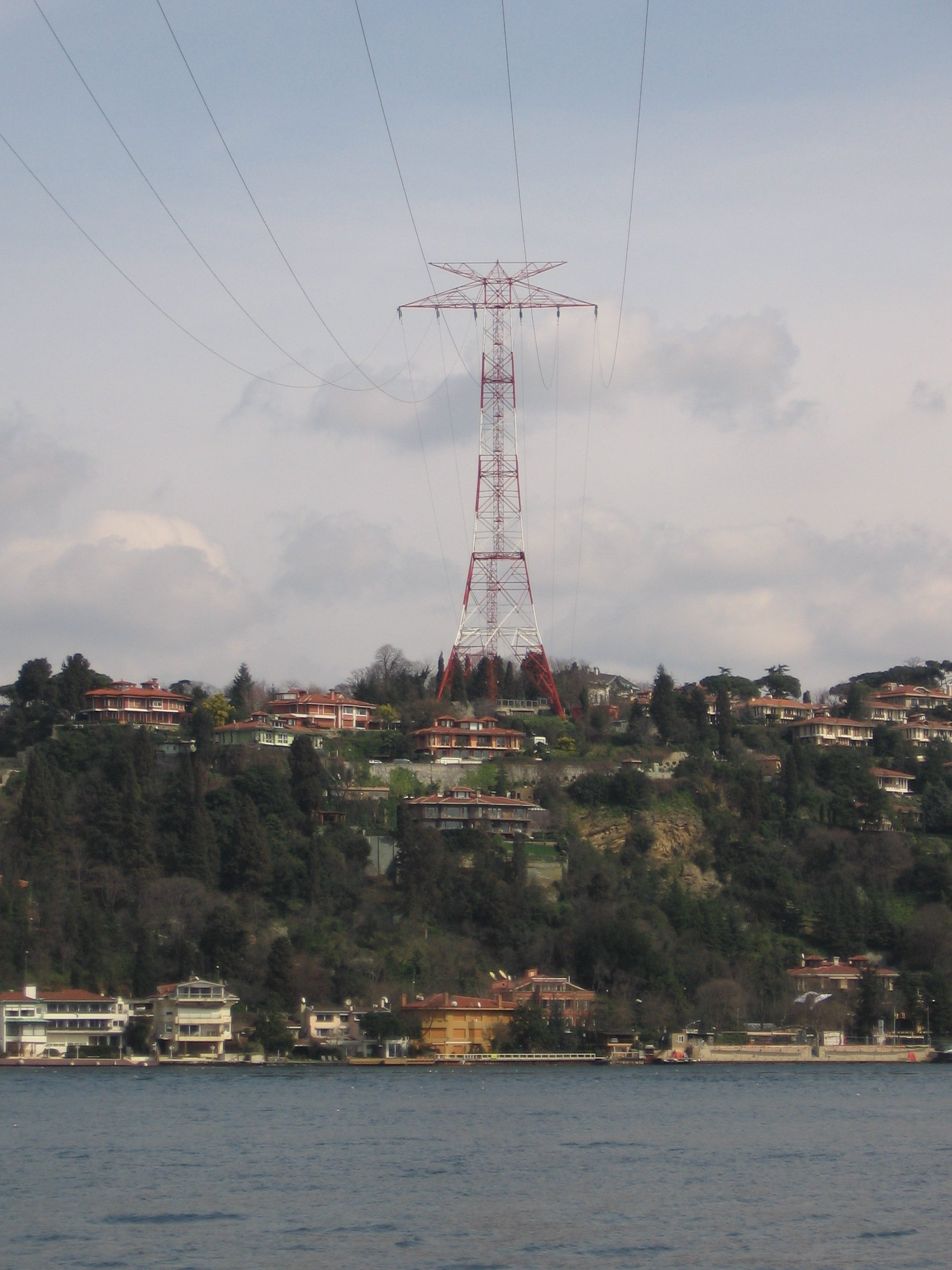
From Arnavutköy

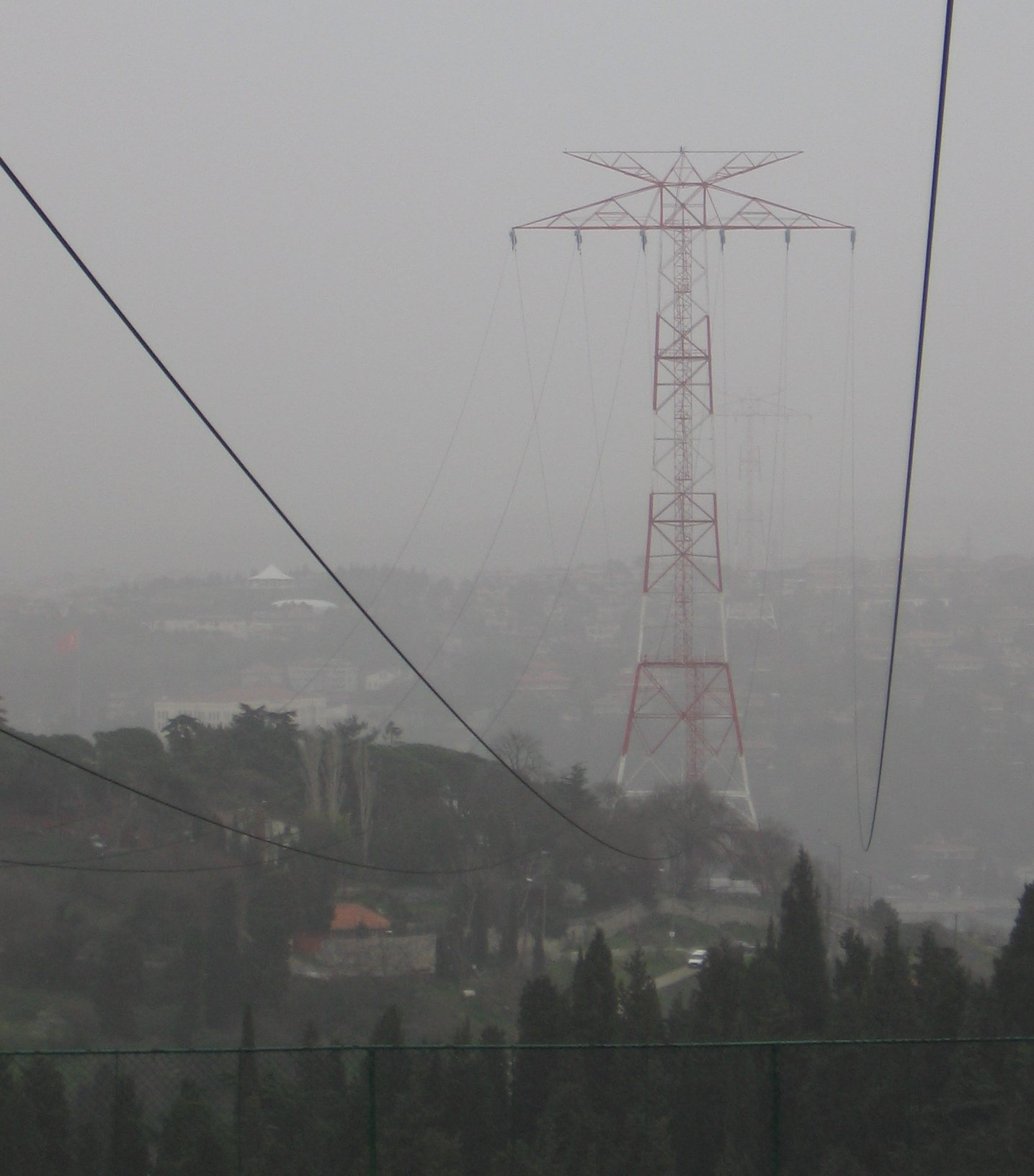
From Etiler

=== Coordinates ===
- Strainers West: 41.072483°N 29.029377°E, 41.0726403°N 29.0293765°E
- Suspension Tower West: 41.071763°N 29.040315°E
- Suspension Tower East: 41.070311°N 29.059246°E
- Strainers East: 41.069834°N 29.064776°E, 41.0699792°N 29.0648192°E

== 380 kV Anadolukavağı-Rumelikavağı ==
=== Crossing II ===
Bosporus overhead line crossing 2 is the second transmission line across Bosporus. It is designed for two 420 kV circuits and it went in service in 1983. It has a span width of 1,906 m (6,253 ft) and is mounted on 124 metres tall pylons.

==== Coordinates ====
- Strainers West: 41.179678°N 29.062622°E, 41.1799722°N 29.0628316°E
- Suspension Tower West: 41.176318°N 29.069312°E
- Suspension Tower East: 41.167108°N 29.086242°E
- Strainers East: 41.163420°N 29.092577°E, 41.1637193°N 29.0928724°E

=== Crossing III ===
Bosporus overhead line crossing 3 is the third overhead line crossing of the Bosporus. It is adjacent to the second crossing, and is designed for four 420 kV circuits, but can be used after some re-engineering work also for 800 kV lines. Since 1999, two of the four circuits are in use. The pylons on which the 1,884 m (6,181 ft) crossing span is mounted are 160 m (520 ft) high.

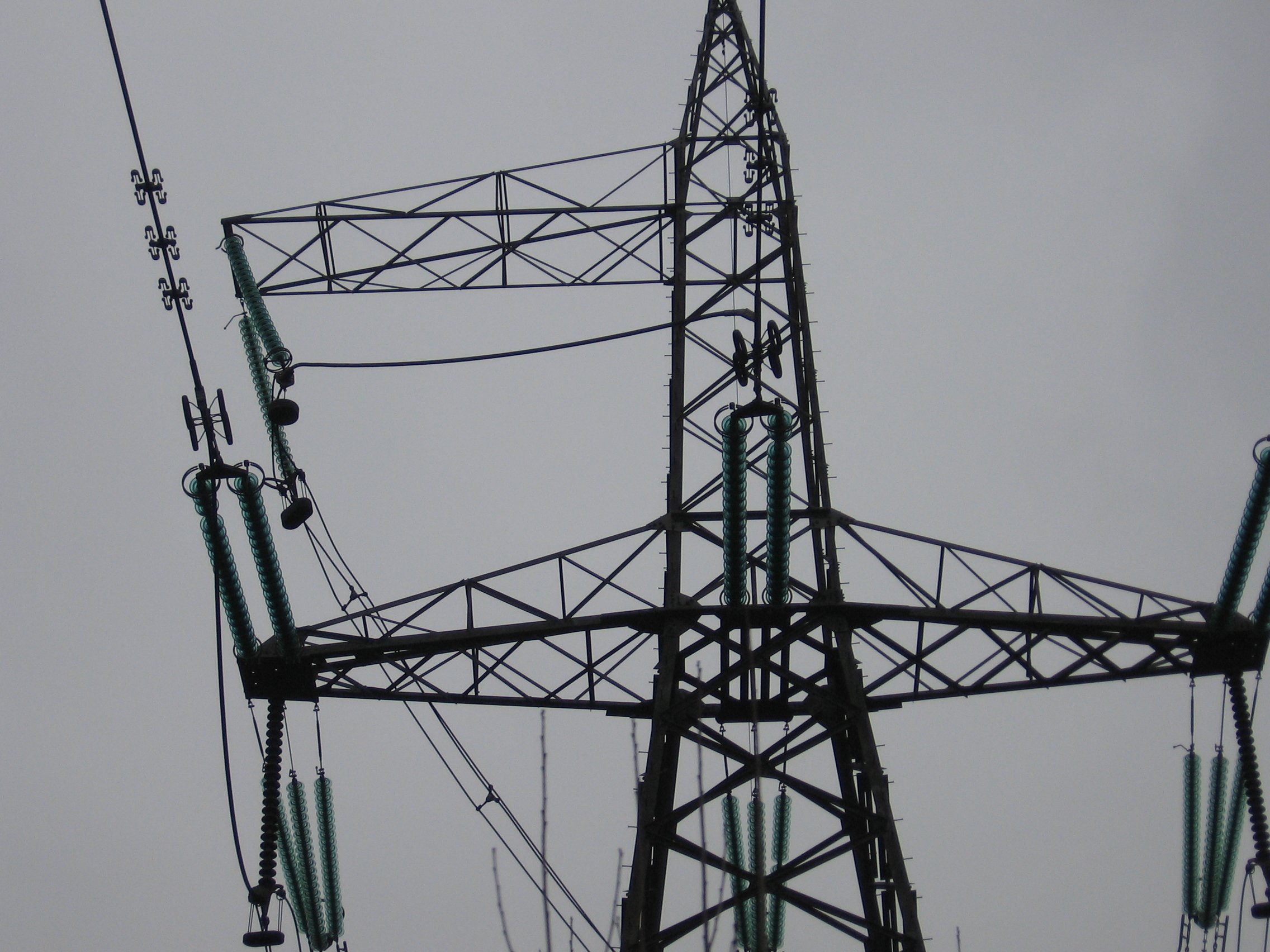
Anchor Tower at Anadolu Kavağı, at Asian side

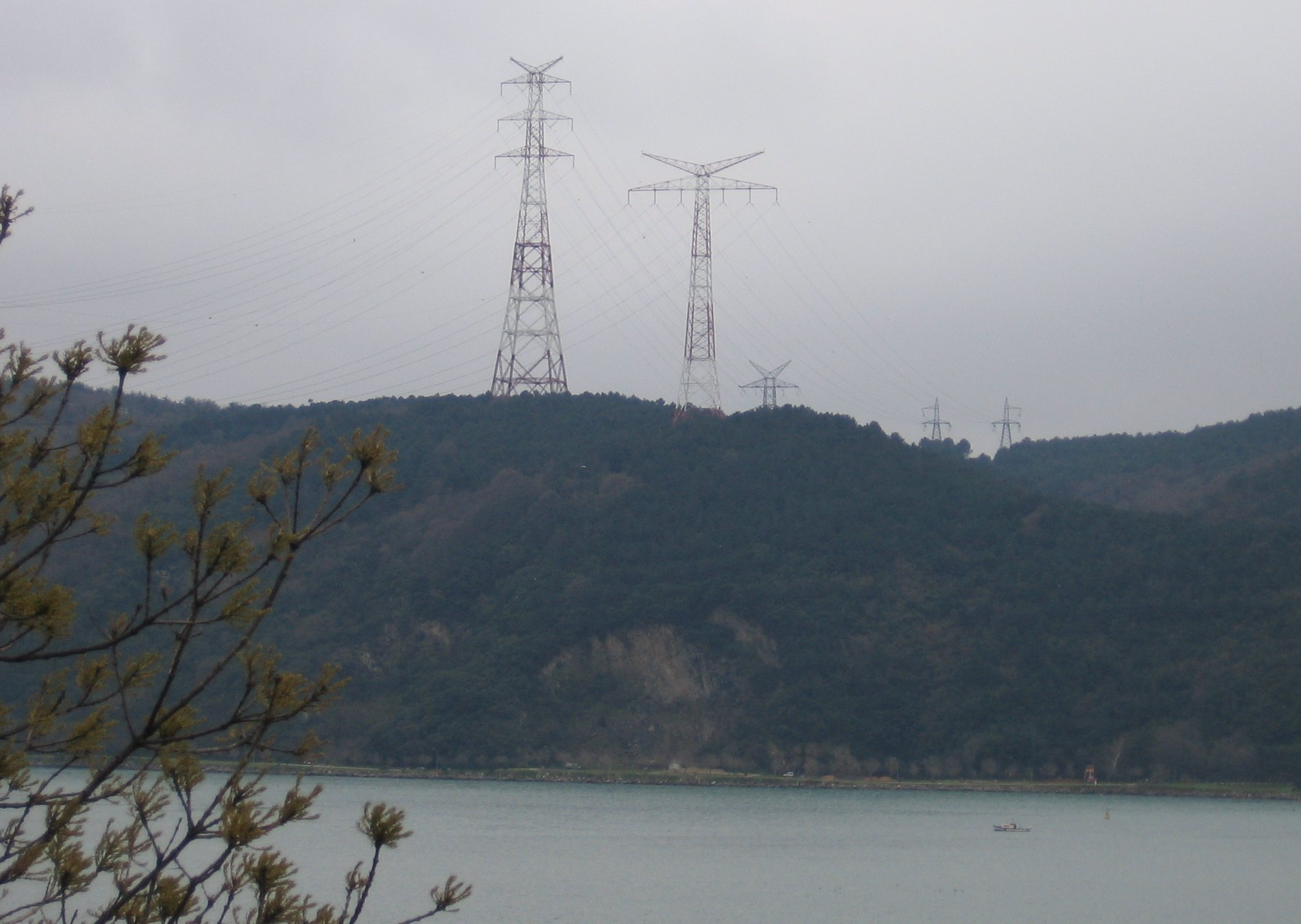
Looking east from Sarıyer

==== Coordinates ====
- Strainer West: 41.180828°N 29.063154°E
- Suspension Tower West: 41.177041°N 29.070267°E
- Suspension Tower East: 41.167136°N 29.088441°E
- Strainer East: 41.164487°N 29.093312°E

== Gallery ==
154 kV

380 kV

== See also ==
- List of towers
- List of spans
