= Kootenay Lake Crossing =

Kootenay Lake Crossing is a powerline crossing of Kootenay Lake, British Columbia, Canada. The idea was to transport electricity from the Hydro dam on the Kootenay River at Brilliant to the Cominco Sullivan Mine at Kimberley. The most direct route was across Kootenay Lake. Originally it was with a span width of 3,248 metres (10,656 ft) the longest powerline span of North America and fixed on three 19-metre (62 ft)-tall towers at the west shore, one for each electrical phase, and a 112 metres (367 ft) tall electricity pylon on the east shore. This tower was erected in spite of high mountains on the east shore for building short towers were available, as erecting span terminal towers on them would have required a longer span, for which the use of spliced conductors were required, which was undesired as the splicing point is a potential point of failure. Roebling Cable provided the steel support cable for the conductor. The height of conductor over Kootenay Lake was 37 metres (121 ft).

Kootenay Lake Crossing was inaugurated in 1952, but on March 8, 1962, the huge tower on the east shore was destroyed by explosives placed by the Sons of Freedom religious sect of the Doukhobors. As at those days longer unspliced conductor ropes were available, the destroyed tower was not rebuilt, instead as replacement a 19 metres tall tower triple like that on the west shore of Kootenay Lake on a higher area on the east shore was built.

The powerline is still in operation today, but today with 63 kV instead of 170 kV as originally proposed.

== Coordinates of Powerline Crossing Triples ==
- East shore: 49°42'2"N 116°51'59"W
- West shore: 49°42'29"N 116°54'44"W
