= Portofino transmitter =

Broadcast transmitter in Italy

Portofino transmitter Portofino Vetta transmitter
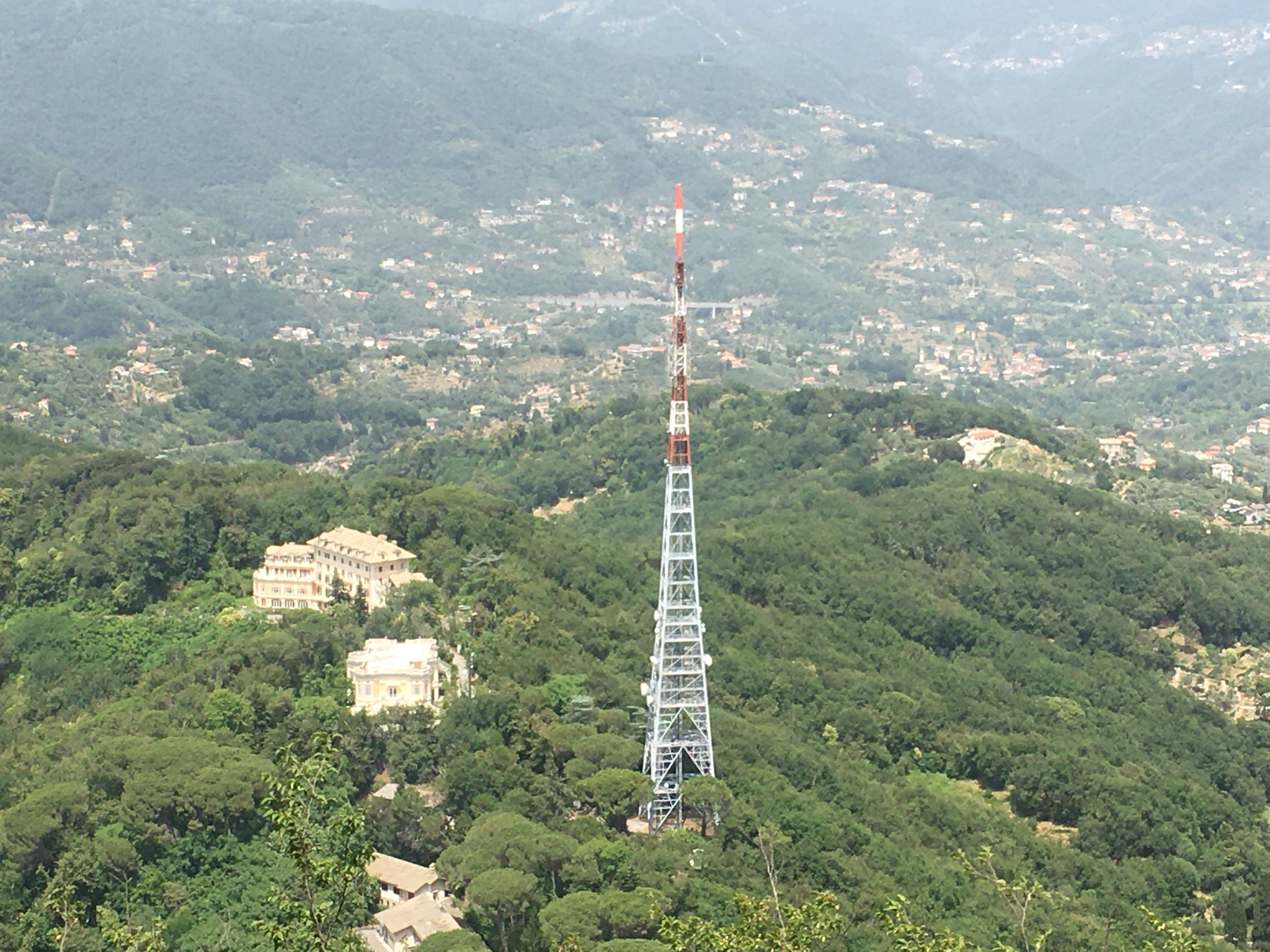
- Interactive map of Portofino transmitter Portofino Vetta transmitter

General information
- Type: TV transmission tower
- Coordinates: 44.3323°N 9.1714°E
- Owner: RAI
- Height: 123 m

Portofino transmitter is a facility for FM-/AM-/TV-broadcasting on Monte di Portofino near Ruta, Camogli in Italy. The transmitter is not located within the municipality of Portofino, but is located nearby, on the border between Camogli and Santa Margherita Ligure. The area can be reached from the Ruta, following the road that leads to the Hotel Portofino Vetta.

== Features ==
Portofino transmitter uses for the mediumwave transmitter, which works on 1575 kHz with 50 kW a very unusual antenna, which consists of a wire which is fixed on a rope that is spun over a distance of 590 metres between a rock anchor and a 123 metres tall lattice tower, which carries the FM-/TV-broadcasting antennas. This may be the only broadcasting transmitter in Europe, which uses a wire span over a valley as part of the antenna system. Close to the main tower, there was a second lattice tower with triangular cross section.

== See also ==
- Hotel Portofino Kulm
- List of towers
- List of spans
