= Sognefjord Span =

The Sognefjord Spans are the second, third, and fourth longest spans in the world situated east of Hermansverk/Leikanger in Vestland county, Norway. They are located in Sogndal Municipality, Vik Municipality, and Lærdal Municipality. The spans are part of different powerlines which traverse the county. The Sognefjord Span crosses the deep fjord valley, so the pylons of these spans are not taller than ordinary pylons. In order to avoid any approaches or contacts between the conductors, each is mounted on a separate pylon at the end of the span, which is built as a steel framework tower.

Sognefjord Spans
Tower locations (zoom in to see exact locations)
1 Span 1 (North tower 1)
2 Span 1 (North tower 2)
3 Span 1 (North tower 3)
4 Span 1 (North tower 4)
5 Span 1 (South tower 1)
6 Span 1 (South tower 2)
7 Span 1 (South tower 3)
8 Span 1 (South tower 4)
9 Span 2 (West tower 1)
10 Span 2 (West tower 2)
11 Span 2 (West tower 3)
12 Span 2 (West tower 4)
13 Span 2 (East tower 1)
14 Span 2 (East tower 2)
15 Span 2 (East tower 3)
16 Span 2 (East tower 4)
17 Span 3 (South tower 1)
18 Span 3 (South tower 2)
19 Span 3 (South tower 3)
20 Span 3 (North tower 1)
21 Span 3 (North tower 2)
22 Span 3 (North tower 3)

== Span 1 ==
This span is part of the powerline between Hermansverk (61°10′49″N 6°51′53″E) and Vikøyri (61°04′50″N 6°35′13″E) and was built in the 1950s. It has a length of 4,850 metres (15,910 ft). This span was the longest span in the world until the inauguration of Ameralik Span. This span crosses the Sognefjord in a north-south direction. It has 4 conductors, one of which is for reserve.

== Span 2 ==
Span 2 is located about 400 metres (1,300 ft) southeast of the southern end of Span 1. This span is a powerline between the Sogndal (61°13′6″N 7°1′20″E) and Hove (61°04′12″N 6°35′43″E) substations. It crosses the Sognefjord in an east-west direction and it has a length of 4,520 metres (14,830 ft). Just like Span 1, it has 4 conductors, with one as a reserve.

== Span 3 ==
Approximately 9 kilometres (5.6 mi) east-southeast of the first two spans, Span 3 crosses the Sognefjord with a powerline from the Aurland1 power station (60°51′46″N 7°18′04″E) to the Langedøla power station (61°26′14″N 7°14′44″E). Span 3 has a length of 4,500 metres (14,800 ft) and it runs in a north-south direction. It has no reserve conductor and therefore consists of 3 conductors.

== See also ==
- List of spans
