= Power line crossings in Poland =

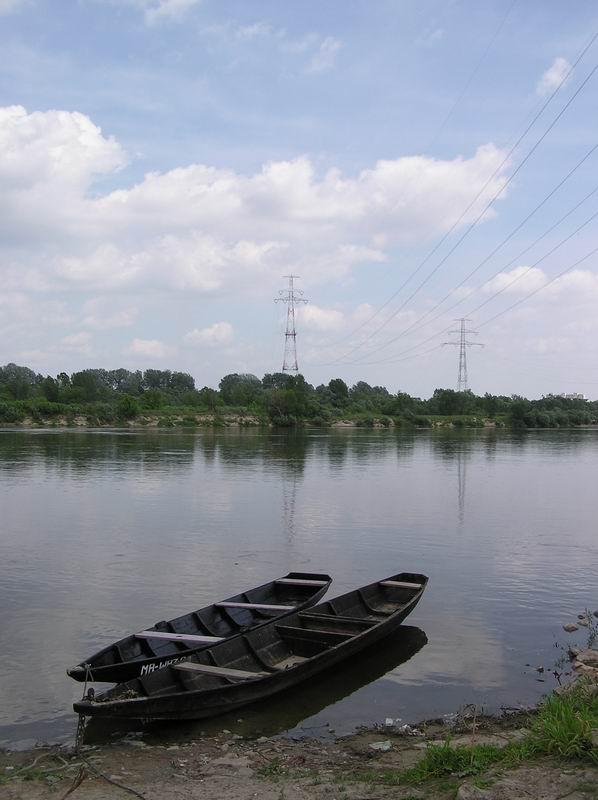
Nowodwory-Łomianki Vistula Powerline Crossing, view from Łomianki

In Poland, there are 6 powerline crossings of the Vistula river and one powerline crossing of the Odra river using pylons taller than 100 metres.

== Ostrówek-Tursko Vistula Powerline Crossing ==
Ostrówek-Tursko Vistula Powerline Crossing is a Vistula powerline crossing with a span-width of 880 metres on two 115-metre tall pylons, one situated at Ostrówek at 50°26′5.21″N 21°21′27.72″E the other at Tursko at 50°26′29.17″N 21°21′3.85″E.

== Lubanie-Bobrowniki Vistula Powerline Crossing ==
Lubanie-Bobrowniki Vistula Powerline Crossing is a Vistula powerline crossing with a span-width of 960 metres on two 117-metre tall pylons, one situated at Lubanie at 51°30′10.41″N 21°51′37.48″E, the other situated at Bobrowniki at 51°30′10.8″N 21°50′45.96″E. Lubanie-Bobrowniki Vistula Powerline Crossing, which is part of the powerline from Kozienice to Puławy, uses pylons for 6 conductors arranged on two crossbars and a separate crossbar for the two ground conductors.

== Regów-Gołąb Vistula Powerline Crossing ==
Regów-Gołąb Vistula Powerline Crossing, which is situated close to Lubaniew-Bobrowniki Vistula powerline crossing consists of two 108-metre tall pylons of the delta-type for a single 400 kV powerline circuit. It is a part of the powerline from Kozienice to Lublin and crosses the Vistula river with a span width of 960 metres. The pylons stand at 51°30′13.39″N 21°50′46.88″E near Regów and at 51°30′13.05″N 21°51′38.74″E near Gołąb.

== Świerże Górne-Rybaków Vistula Powerline Crossing ==
Świerże Górne-Rybaków Vistula Powerline Crossing is a powerline crossing of the Vistula River with a span width of 1,025 metres. It consists of two 116-metre tall pylons, one situated near Świerże Górne at 51°39′29.07″N 21°29′56.01″E and the other situated near Rybaków at 51°40′1.94″N 21°29′50.22″E.

== Nowodwory-Łomianki Vistula Powerline Crossing ==
Nowodwory-Łomianki Vistula Powerline Crossing is a Vistula powerline crossing north of Warsaw with a span width of 963 metres. It uses pylons with 3 crossbars for 6 circuits with a v-shaped top for the two ground conductors. The pylon on the Western shore of Vistula near Łomianki at 52°19′33.65″N 20°55′16.85″E is 121 metres tall, that at Nowodwory at 52°19′32.67″N 20°56′08.42″E 127 meters. The latter is the tallest electricity pylon in Poland.

== Nowy Bógpomóż-Probostwo Dolne Vistula Powerline Crossing ==
Nowy Bógpomóż-Probostwo Dolne Vistula Powerline Crossing, part of the 220 kV powerline running from Olsztyn to Wloclawek, is a powerline crossing of the Vistula river with a span width of 1,248 metres, which is probably the longest powerline span of Poland. The pylon on the western site of the Vistula river is situated near Probostwo Dolne at 52°45′50.43″N 18°56′48.88″E is 109 metres, the pylon on the eastern site near Nowy Bógpomóż at 52°46′10.39″N 18°57′46.73″E is 111 metres tall. Both pylons are delta pylons with a single crossbar carrying 3 conductors and 2 ground conductors.

== Skolwin-Inoujście Odra Powerline Crossing ==
Skolwin-Inoujście Odra Powerline Crossing is a powerline crossing of the Odra river north of Szczecin. It has a span width of 664 meters. The pylon at the western shore near Skolwin at 53°31′28.21″N 14°37′42.6″E is 126 metres, the other near Inoujście at 53°31′37.94″N 14°38′13.86″E is 125 metres tall.

== See also ==
- List of tallest structures in Poland
