= Hotel Portofino Kulm =

Hotel in Ruta, Camogli, Italy

Hotel Portofino Kulm Hotel Portofino Vetta
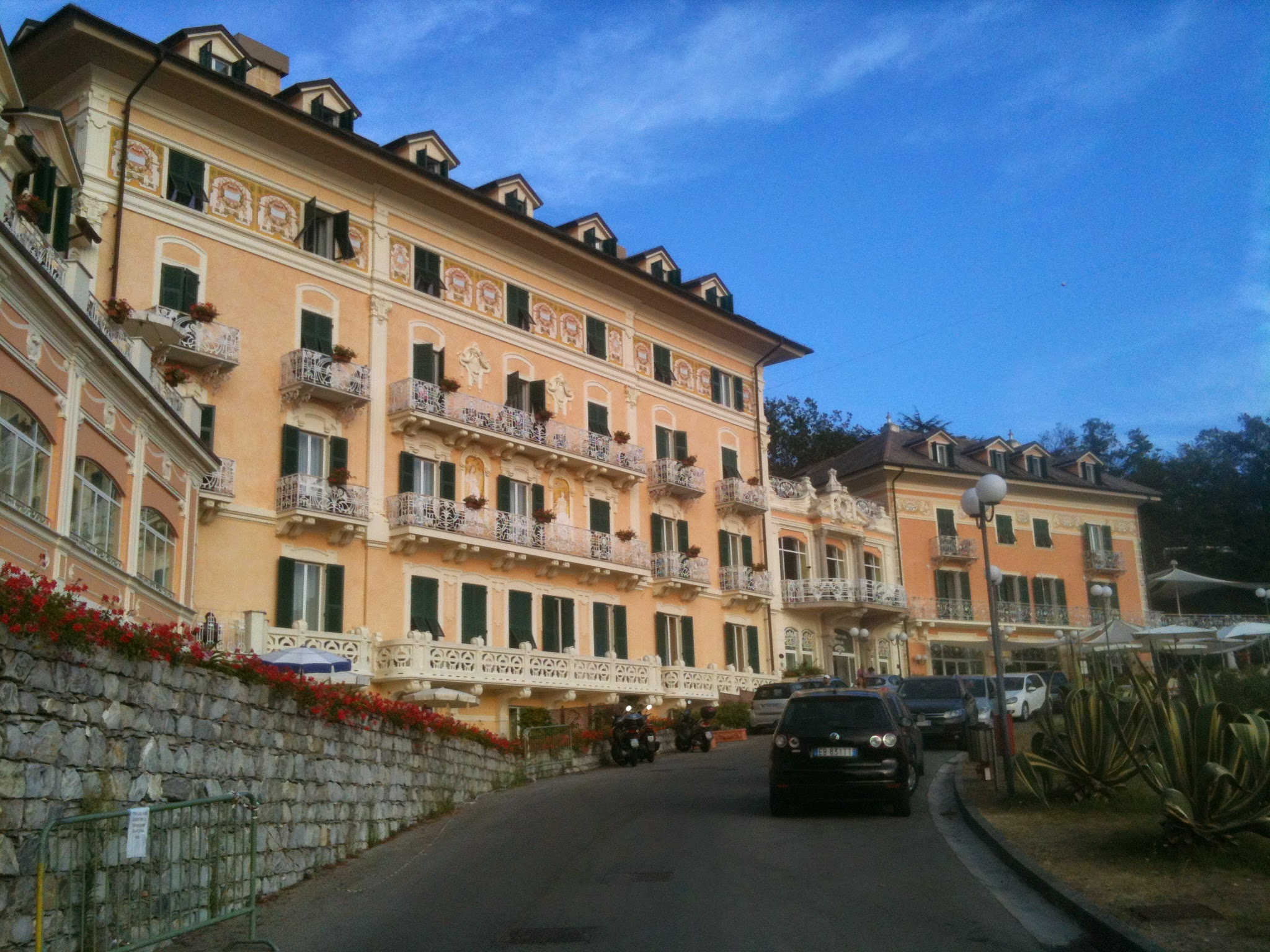
- Hotel Portofino Kulm on August 20, 2012
- Interactive map of the Hotel Portofino Kulm; Hotel Portofino Vetta area

General information
- Location: Via Bernardo Gaggini, 23, 16032 Camogli, Italy
- Coordinates: 44.334574°N 9.17161°E
- Opening: 1906 (120 years ago)
- Closed: 2013 (13 years ago)

Website
- AN Hotel Portofino Kulm

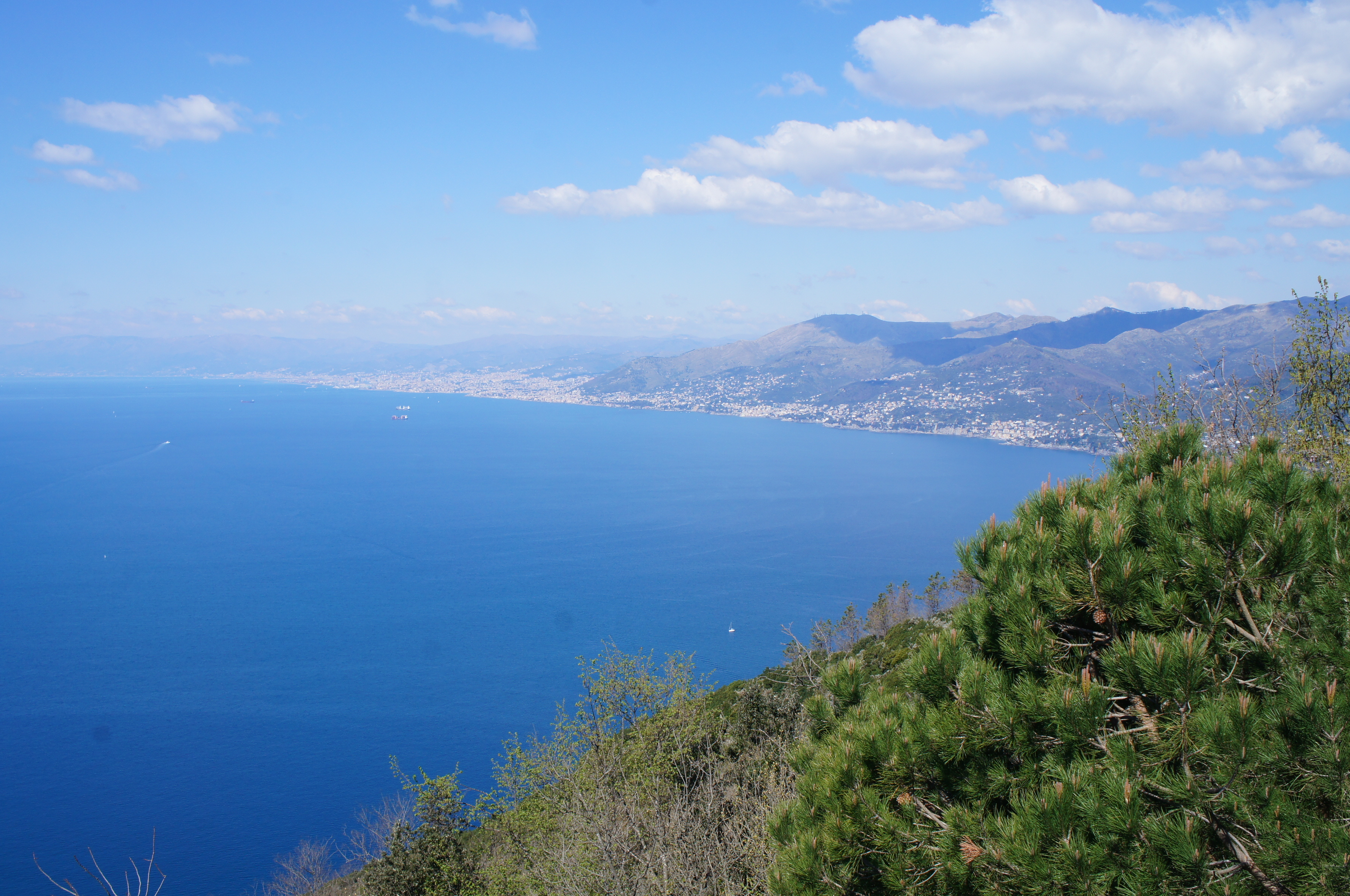
Panorama view from Monte di Portofino on the Paradiso Gulf, coast of Genoa, Italian Riviera

The Hotel Portofino Kulm, on Monte di Portofino, is a hotel in Ruta di Camogli, Camogli, Italy. Architecturally, it is a Liberty style building.

== History ==
The buildings were inaugurated in May 1908, thanks to the vision of Sebastiano Gaggini, a stockbroker in Paris, of an ancient Swiss family from Bissone, who settled in Genoa in the 15th century and who decided at the beginning of 1900 to build a large hotel on Monte Fino above Ruta, in the most beautiful and panoramic position with a simultaneous view of the Tigullio Gulf and the Paradiso Gulf. Its model is the Rigi Kulm Hotel on Lake Lucerne. Gaggini's idea was to create a luxurious retreat that would attract the European elite, capitalizing on the area's pristine air, sunny climate, and scenery. In addition to building the hotel, Gaggini also built the road that leads from Ruta to the hotel.

In early 1904, construction began on the road leading from Ruta to the area designated for the construction of the hotel complex. In eight months, using 32,000 mines and 350 workers a day, he built a road 2.6 kilometers long and 7 meters wide. It was inaugurated in December 1905. Plans to build a continuation of the road leading to the summit (610 m) of Monte Fino were abandoned due to the huge costs this would have entailed. In 1906 the Grand Restaurant building was inaugurated and in February 1907 the Hotel Hermitage. The entire hotel complex was completed and inaugurated in May 1908.

During its heyday, the hotel became a symbol of the Belle Époque and hosted numerous notable guests. Among them were Queen Margherita of Savoy and Gabriele D'Annunzio, who suggested renaming the area Portofino Vetta to replace the Germanic Kulm. Other visitors included the inventor Guglielmo Marconi, the composer Giacomo Puccini, the tennis player Suzanne Lenglen, the fencer Nedo Nadi, Italo Balbo, diplomats, nobles and industrialists from all over Europe.

The hotel played a role during World War I when it was repurposed as a prison camp for Austro-Hungarian soldiers who, to earn money, cut down many of the surrounding trees to produce charcoal, which they then sold in Camogli and Recco. It was later transformed into a military hospital for wounded Italian officers.

Despite these interruptions, it managed to retain its prestige for much of the 20th century.

The structure had been renovated in the last decade of the 20th century and in the first decade of the 21st century, and hosted other notable guests, including The Bold and the Beautiful cast members. The restaurant Zeffirino Kulm was managed with great skill and professional by the Belloni family, offered traditional Ligurian Italian cuisine. The italian cuisine was refined and high-quality. The staff was always attentive to the needs of hotel guests and tourists. However, in 2013, The hotel was closed due to a legal dispute between the owners and the managers. It remained closed for 13 years and guarded by police officers who ensured the judicial seizure of the property subject to legal dispute. In this way it did not suffer any theft or vandalism. The owner put the hotel up for sale.

On December 13, 2024, the AKNO Group acquired ownership of the hotel, and at the beginning of 2025 proposed plans for the restoration of the hotel structure, with an expansion project in agreement with Comune di Camogli and Parco naturale regionale di Portofino. The project included the construction of an underground car park behind the hotel, a new swimming pool, a new heliport and the restoration of all the services and areas of the hotel, such as the spa, the fitness gym, the tennis court, the restaurant, the café, the ice cream shop, the small shopping areas and the renovation of the garden with roses and flowering plants typical of Liguria, preserving all the trees that surround the hotel. However, the renovation and expansion works proposed for the hotel structure in 2025 have never been carried out. As of 1 January 2026, the hotel is still in a state of abandonment with no renovation work carried out, closed and even the road leading to the hotel is not in good condition.

== See also ==
- Italian Riviera
- Camogli
- Portofino
- Santa Margherita Ligure
- Portofino transmitter
