= Osaki Channel Crossing =

Power line between islands in Japan

The Osaki Channel Crossing is a power line crossing over Seto Inland Sea south of Yoshina, Takehara in Japan, which was built in 1997 and runs from Chugoku Electric Power's Ozaki Power Station at to the Japanese Mainland at, with two water crossings: the Nagashima Sector, connecting the Power Station to Usujima, with a span width of 1603 metres, and the Yoshina Sector, which spans from Usujima to the mainland at 2145 metres long. At a height of 223 metres, the towers of the Yoshina Sector are just 3 metres shorter than those of the Chūshi Powerline Crossing, making them the second-tallest electricity pylons in Japan. The pylons follow a barrel design with 3 crossbars.

These sectors are part of the greater Osaki Thermal Power Line, which links the main power station with the Kurose Substation by a 220-kilovolt transmission cable.
