= Tricable gondola lift =

Cable car system introduced in 1991

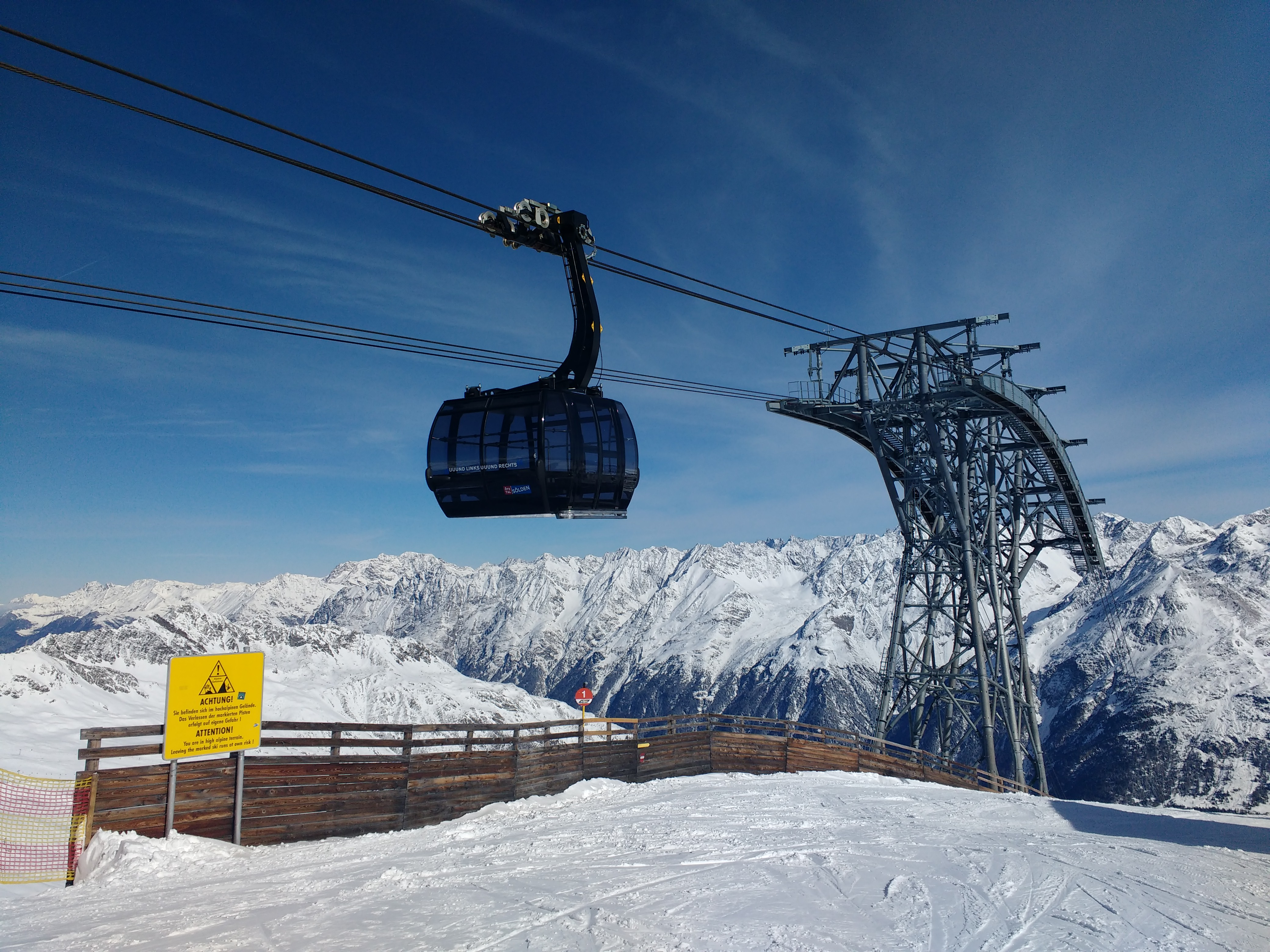
A Doppelmayr tricable gondola lift in Sölden, Austria

Operation and maintenance of tricable gondola lift Penkenbahn in Mayrhofen, Austria

The tricable gondola lift, also known as the 3S gondola lift, is a cable car system that was developed by the Swiss company Von Roll transport systems in Thun to unite the benefits of a gondola lift with those of a reversible cable car system. '3S' is an abbreviation of the German word component Dreiseil-, meaning 'tricable'.

== History ==
The first cable car system of this type, called Alpine Express I, was built in 1991 in Saas-Fee. In 1994, a further section, called Alpine Express II, became operational. The cabins of these cable cars have space for 30 people and travel at a speed of 6 m/s pulled by an endless hauling cable, and suspended from two carrying cables.

A lane thus consists of three cables, from which the system takes its name. As with most rotating cabin cableways, gondolas are detachable from the cables in order to allow easy disembarkation without disrupting the transit of other cabins on the system. The system offers plenty of advantages, including lower energy consumption, high passenger capacity and comfort, more frequent departures, increased wind stability, larger ground distances and rope spans, and a high driving speed.

Development and building of the Alpine Express I cost 70 million CHF. Von Roll built no more 3S cable cars after the two systems in Saas Fee. When Von Roll was acquired by the Austrian company Doppelmayr in 1996, Doppelmayr obtained the knowledge for 3S gondola lift construction. Doppelmayr constructed their first system in 2002, in Val-d'Isère, France.

Since then, the Italian company Leitner has also developed a 3S system, constructing their first system in 2009, in Ritten, Italy.

Doppelmayr has developed a tricable gondola carriage which generates electricity. The wheels that roll along the two support cables are attached to electric generators. The electricity is used to power seat heating, lighting, and other electrical features inside the cabins.

== Notable installations ==
=== Kitzbühel ===
The 3S cable car in Kitzbühel, Austria bridges the Saukasergraben and connects the skiing areas of Kirchberg and Resterhöhe with one another. The lift opened in January 2005 and is 3,642 metres long. A journey takes approximately nine minutes from end to end. At its highest point, the cableway is 400 metres from the ground. The use of only one aerial lift pylon resulted in an unusual span width of 2,507 metres between the valley station and the 80-metre support pillar. Overall, the system cost 13.5 million euros with each cabin costing 100,000 euros.

The cableway was manufactured by Doppelmayr. The cable has a diameter of 54 millimetres. The electrical power consumption is 400 kW. There are 19 cabins in total, however the system can be expanded to 24 cabins if the need arises in the future. Each cabin seats 24 people, allowing the system to transport a total of 3,200 people in any given hour. One cabin has a glass floor, making it possible to view the 400 metre drop from a different angle.

=== Peak 2 Peak Gondola ===
In December 2008, Whistler Blackcomb ski resort in British Columbia became the first North American resort to install a 3S lift when it opened the Peak 2 Peak Gondola, which connects Roundhouse Lodge on Whistler with Rendezvous Lodge on Blackcomb. The installation of the Peak 2 Peak Gondola eliminated the need to use the base area gondolas to get between Whistler and Blackcomb, connecting the areas together.

=== Sochi ===
The Olympic Village lift in Sochi, Russia, was built in 2012 by Doppelmayr. The lift has hangers designed to transport road vehicles, in addition to the regular passenger cabins.

=== Hòn Thơm ===
In February 2018, the Hòn Thơm lift, in Vietnam, became the longest passenger ropeway in the world, at 7.9 km long. The lift travels over several of the Phú Quốc islands, in the Gulf of Thailand. The system was manufactured by Doppelmayr.

=== Matterhorn Glacier Ride ===
In September 2018, the Matterhorn Glacier Ride opened in Zermatt, running parallel to the existing cable car up to the Klein Matterhorn. The top station is located at 3821 metres above mean sea level, making it the highest altitude tricable gondola lift in the world. A second tricable gondola lift up to the Klein Matterhorn from the Italian Testa Grigia valley station was completed in July 2023. Both systems are manufactured by Leitner.

=== Eiger Express ===
In December 2020, the Eiger Express began operation in Switzerland, directly connecting the village of Grindelwald with the Eiger Glacier, and allowing for much faster access to the Jungfraujoch summit above it.

== The Doppelmayr Tri-line ==
In 2022, Doppelmayr introduced the Tri-line concept, a more compact version of the tricable ropeway that bridges the gap between a monocable gondola and a normal 3s gondola. Compared to monocable gondolas, the Tri-line can be built in more challenging terrain and support longer rope spans. It benefits from proven D-line technology, but with added wind stability up to 110 km/h, less impact on nature and a higher passenger capacity. It features 20-person cabins from CWA called Stella, with place for twelve sitting and 8 standing, as well as the possibility of doors on both sides for better passenger flow. The system can have a passenger capacity of 8000 people per hour and an operating speed up to 7 m/s..

The first TRI-Line cable car was built in Hoch-Ybrig (Switzerland) and opened on November 8, 2025.
