= Eyachtal Span =

Coordinates: 48.80965°N 8.54904°E

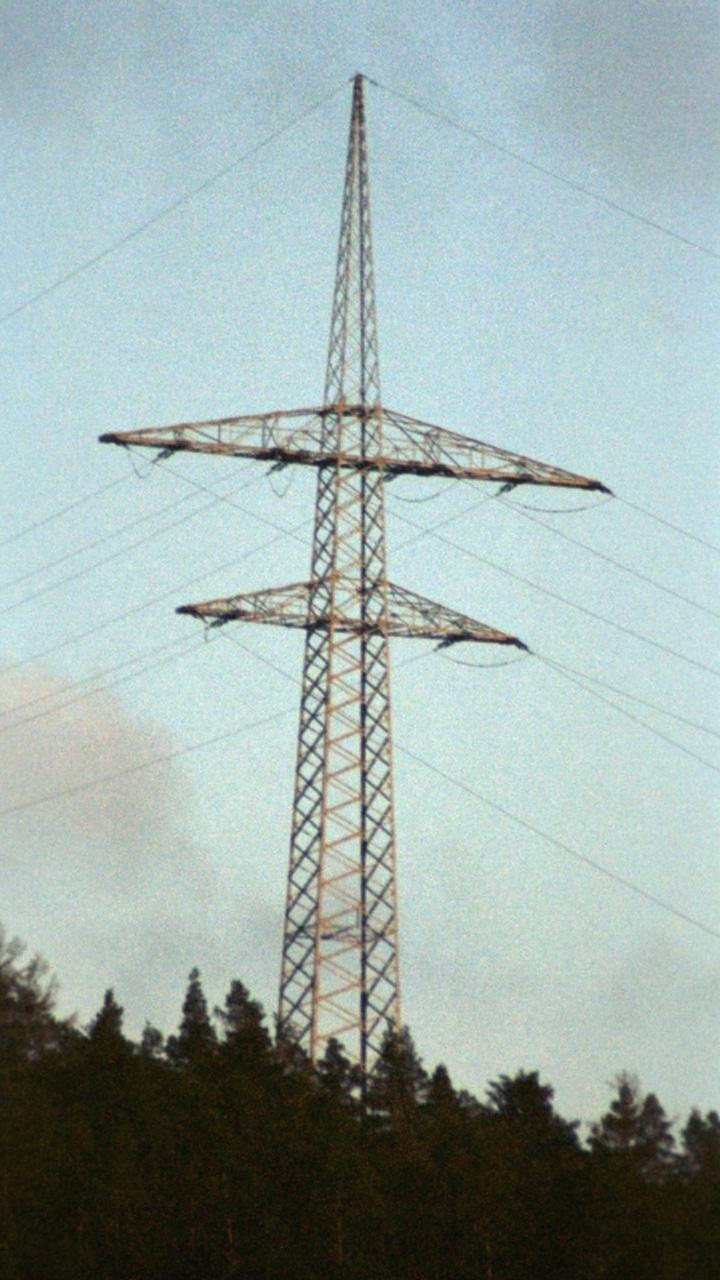
Southern pylon of the Eyachtal Span

The Eyachtal Span is the crossing of the Eyach valley with a 110 kV line in Neuenbürg and Höfen an der Enz in the Black Forest in Germany. The Eyachtal Span was built in 1992. With a span of 1444 metres, it is the greatest span of a power line in Germany. The pylons on which the Eyach Span is fixed are 70 metres high and located on Heuberg and Eiberg.
