= Chūshi Powerline Crossing =

Very tall powerline in Hiroshima prefecture, Japan

Coordinates: 34°19′55.8″N 132°59′3.3″E

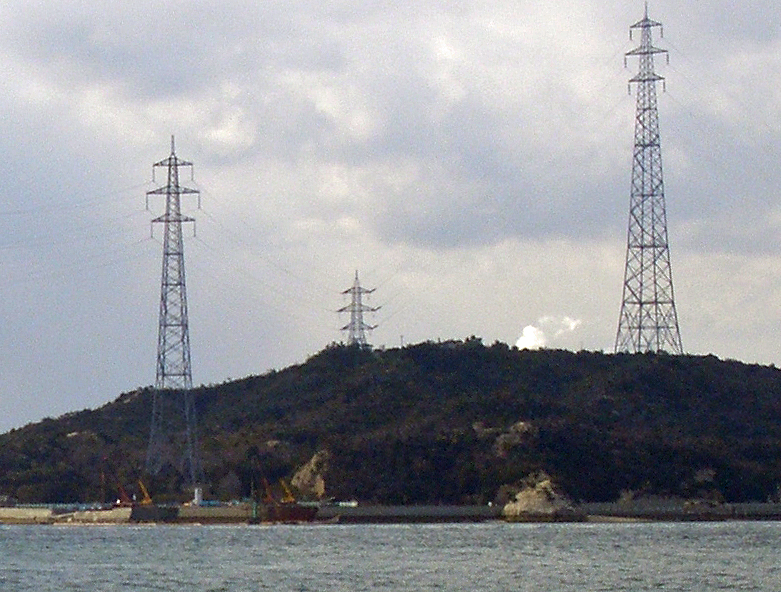
Pylon of Chūshi Powerline Crossing

The Chūshi Powerline Crossing is a part of the Chūshi mainline (中四幹線, Chūshi-kansen), a 220 kV powerline in Japan. It has two circuits running over the Inland Sea from Takehara. It was built in 1962 and consists of two towers, each 226 metres tall, one situated in Takehara, Honshū at, the other on the island of Ōkunoshima at . These towers are the tallest electricity pylons in Japan and carry six conductors arranged in three levels. The span between the two towers has a length of 2,357 metres and has a minimum clearance of 42 metres. The conductors have a cross section of 170 mm^{2}, a diameter 35.2 mm and are designed for a maximum current of 645 A.

== See also ==
- Osaki Channel Crossing
