= Probostwo Dolne =

- Village
- Location within Poland
- Coordinates: 52°44′59″N 18°55′08″E
- Country: Poland
- Voivodeship: Kuyavian-Pomeranian
- County: Włocławek
- Gmina: Lubanie

Probostwo Dolne [prɔˈbɔstfɔ ˈdɔlnɛ] is a village in the administrative district of Gmina Lubanie, within Włocławek County, Kuyavian-Pomeranian Voivodeship, in north-central Poland.
