= Doppelmayr/Garaventa Group =

Austrian manufacturing company

Doppelmayr Holding SE
- Type: Private
- Founded: 1893; 133 years ago
- Headquarters: Wolfurt, Vorarlberg, Austria
- Key people: Thomas Pichler, Chief executive officer
- Number of employees: 3781
- Website: www.doppelmayr.com

Doppelmayr/Garaventa Group is an international manufacturer of ropeways and people movers for ski areas, urban transport, amusement parks, and material handling systems. As of 2026, the group had produced over 15,700 installations in 97 countries. Their annual revenue in 2024/2025 was 1,197 million euros. The Doppelmayr/Garaventa Group was formed in 2002 when Doppelmayr of Wolfurt, Austria merged with Garaventa AG of Switzerland to form the world's largest ropeway manufacturer.

== History ==
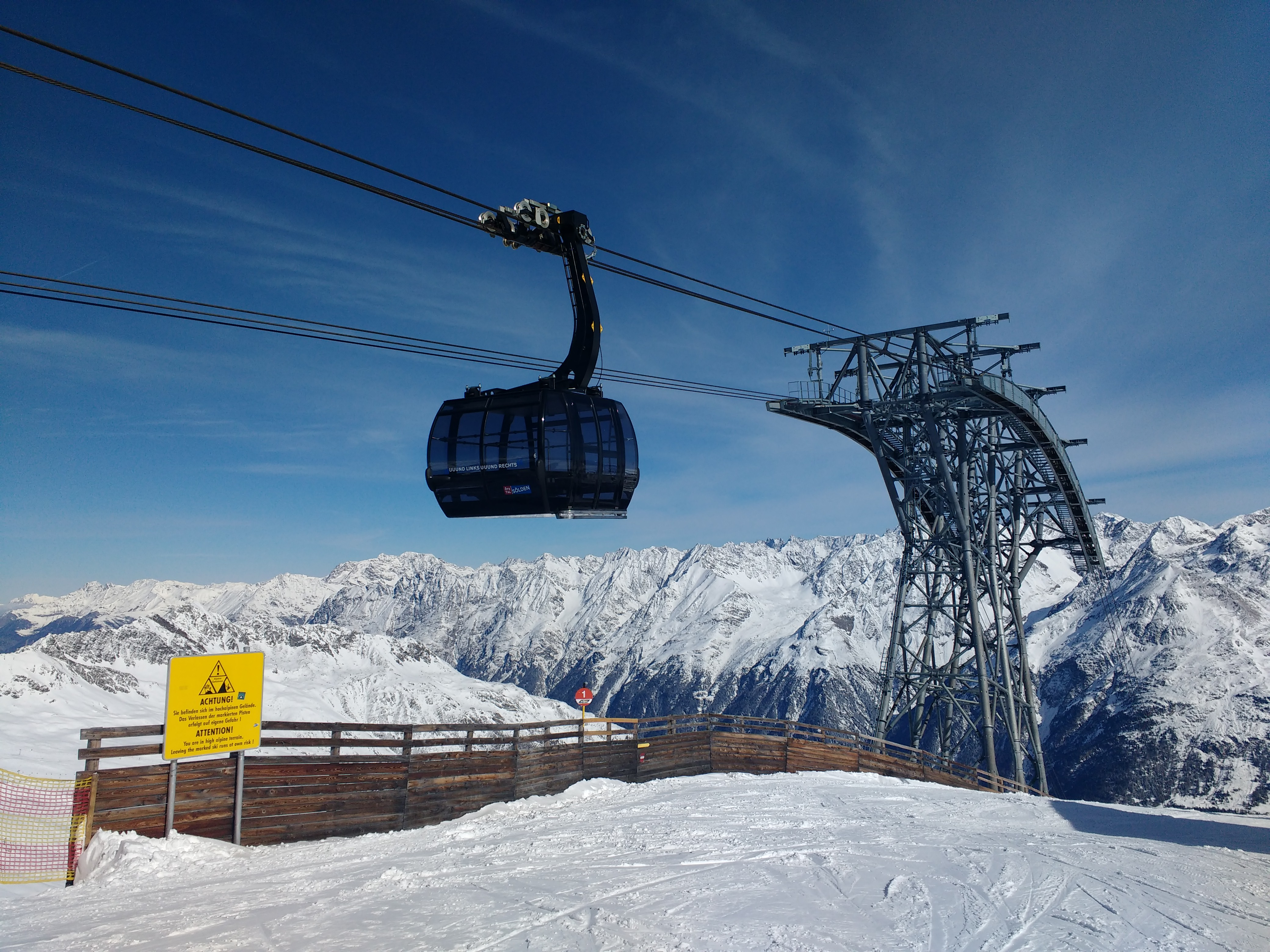
A Doppelmayr tricable gondola lift in Sölden, Austria

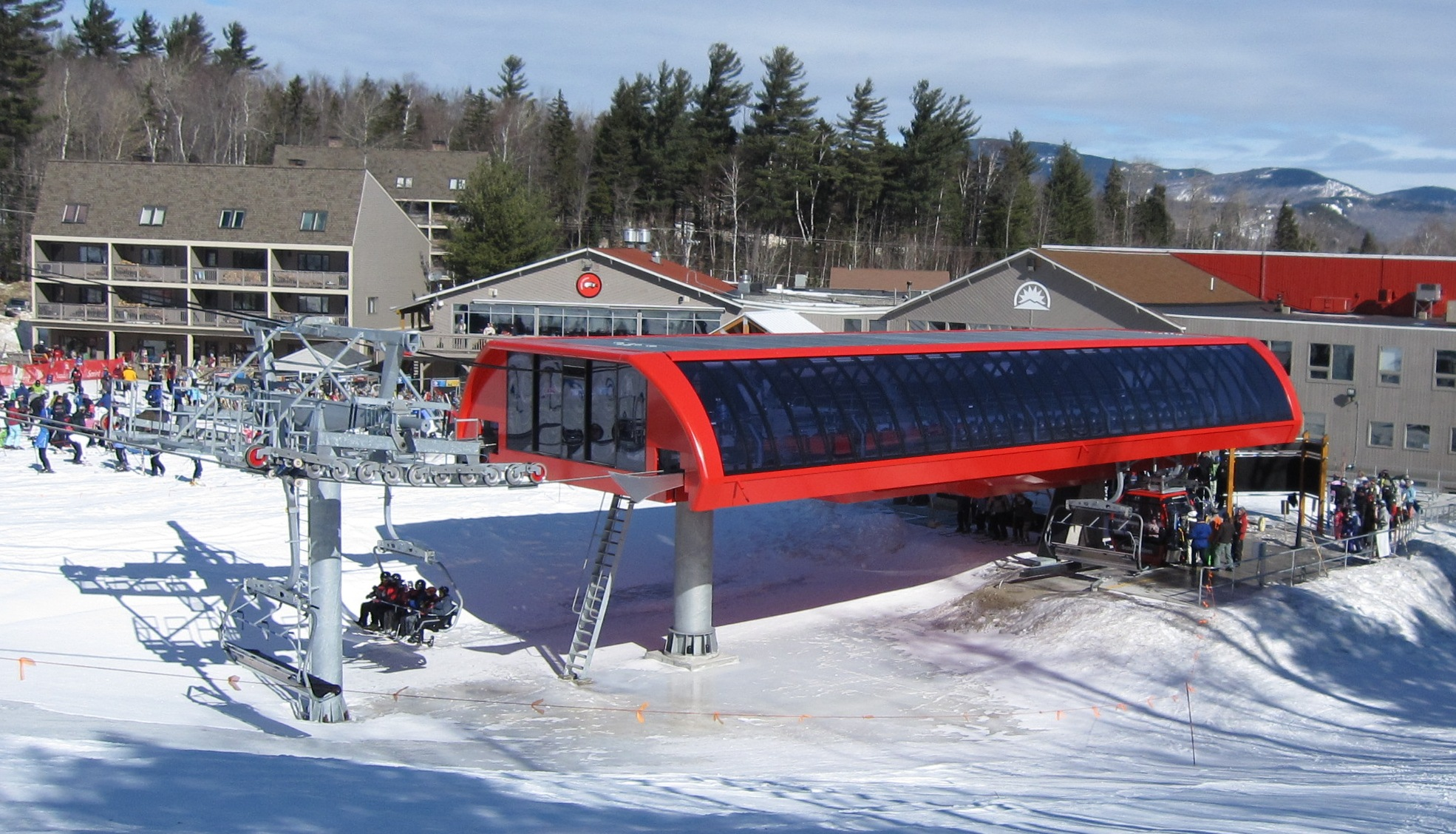
A Doppelmayr CTEC combined lift at Sunday River, Maine, US

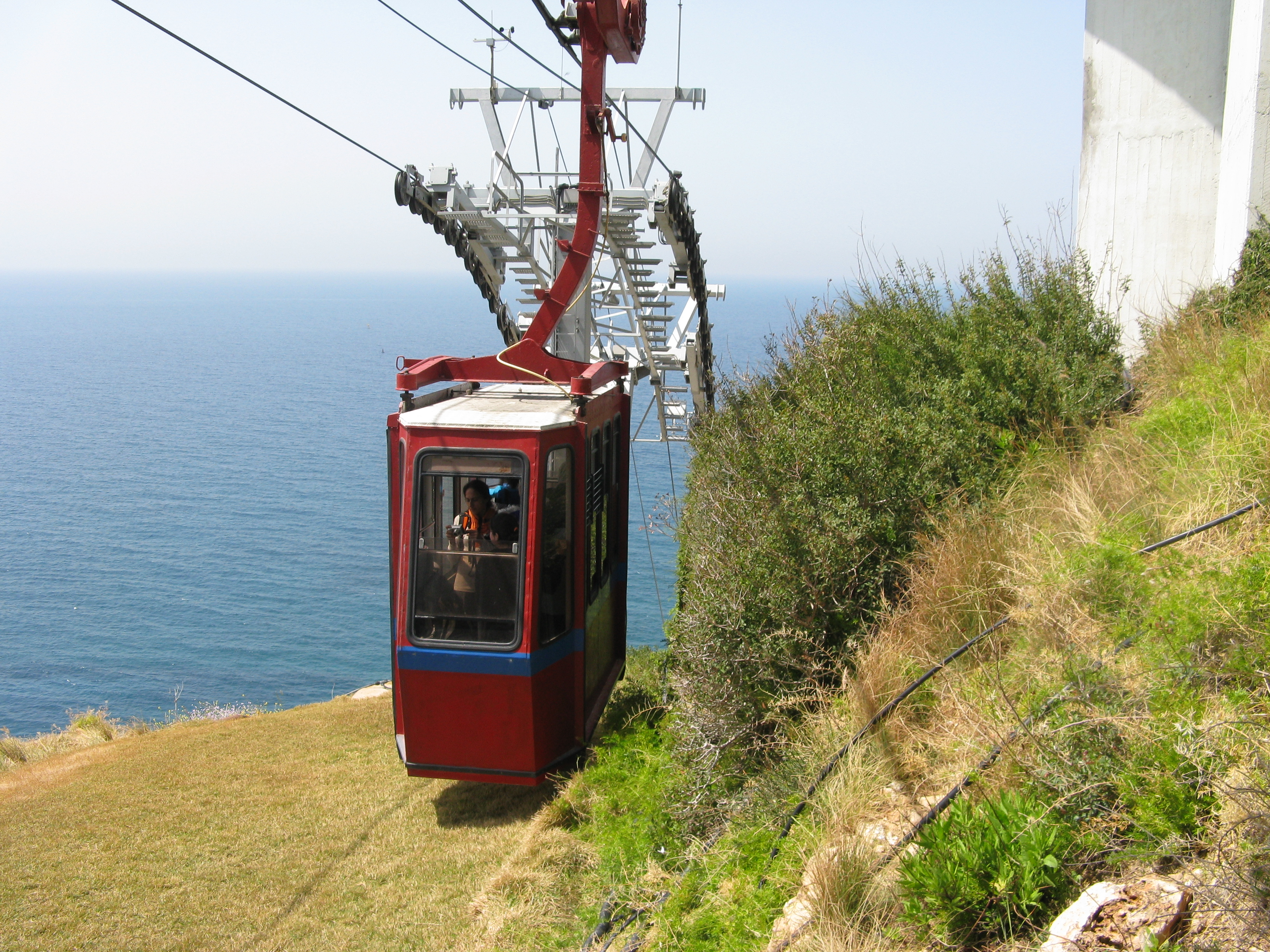
A Doppelmayr cable car at the Rosh HaNikra grottoes, Israel, claimed to be the steepest cable car in the world, with a 60° (173 percent) gradient

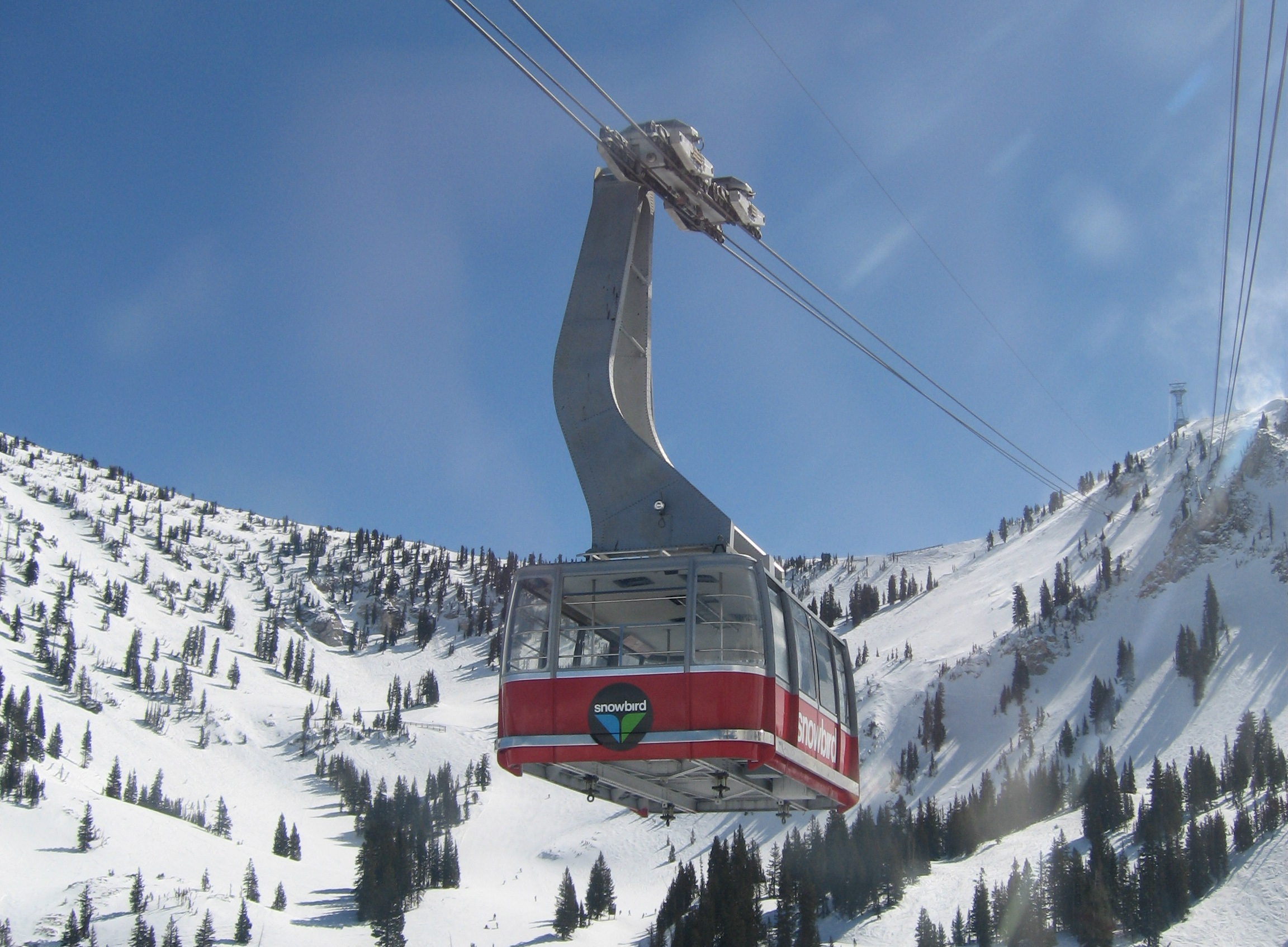
A Garaventa aerial tramway at Snowbird, Utah, US

Doppelmayr was founded in Wolfurt, Austria in 1893 (originally as Konrad Doppelmayr & Sohn), and started manufacturing ropeways in 1937. Garaventa was founded in 1928.

In 1967, Artur Doppelmayr, grandson of the founder Konrad and son of Emil, who was a businessman, became managing director of the company. As alpine recreation rapidly expanded around the world during the last half of the 20th century, Artur led and established the Vorarlberg cable car company as the world leader. In 1996, Doppelmayr Holding AG acquired Von Roll Seilbahnen, a Swiss manufacturer of gondola lifts, chairlifts, and cable cars. In 2002, Doppelmayr acquired CWA, a Swiss maker of gondola and cable car cabins. The merger of Doppelmayr and Garaventa was announced in 2001 and completed in 2002. In 2016 they broke two world records in Vietnam: Called the Ha Long Queen Cable Car, the largest cable car cabins (produced by Swiss company CWA) travel on the tallest ropeway support of the world. In 2017, produced by Garaventa and CWA, the steepest funicular railway came into effect in Stoos, Switzerland.

== Divisions ==
Doppelmayr Garaventa Group operates subsidiaries in 50 countries manufacturing ropeways under the Doppelmayr and Garaventa brands. Seven of these are responsible for manufacturing parts, namely Doppelmayr Seilbahnen GmbH (Austria), Garaventa AG (Switzerland), Doppelmayr Canada Ltd., Sanhe Doppelmayr Transport Systems Co., Ltd. (China), Doppelmayr France, Doppelmayr Italia and Doppelmayr USA.

The company's core ropeway products include cable cars, funiculars, gondola lifts, detachable chairlifts, fixed grip chairlifts, and surface lifts. The company developed the "3S" tricable gondola lift, having acquired the technology from Von Roll Seilbahnen, and built lifts including those located in Kitzbühel (Austria), Koblenz (Germany) and Whistler-Blackcomb (Canada).

=== Doppelmayr Cable Car ===
Doppelmayr Cable Car GmbH
- Type: Corporation subsidiary
- Industry: Transportation
- Founded: 1996; 30 years ago
- Headquarters: Wolfurt, Austria
- Area served: Worldwide
- Products: Automated People Mover systems
- Parent: Doppelmayr Garaventa Group
- Website: www.dcc.at

Doppelmayr Cable Car GmbH manufactures automated people movers. Their main product is the rope-propelled Cable Liner system, used in airports, city centres, intermodal passenger transport connections, park and ride facilities, campuses, resorts, and amusement parks. The company is a wholly owned subsidiary of the Doppelmayr Garaventa Group, having been established by Doppelmayr in 1996. Up until 2019, the subsidiary was referred to as DCC Doppelmayr Cable Car.

The first installation was completed at Mandalay Bay in Las Vegas in 1999. In 2003, after the world's first maglev transport system (opened in 1984 at Birmingham International Airport) fell into disrepair, DCC installed the "AirRail Link" to replace the maglev and temporary replacement bus-service that had been operating since 1995. The company is contracted to operate some of the systems it builds. A newer system is Luton DART, opened in March 2023.

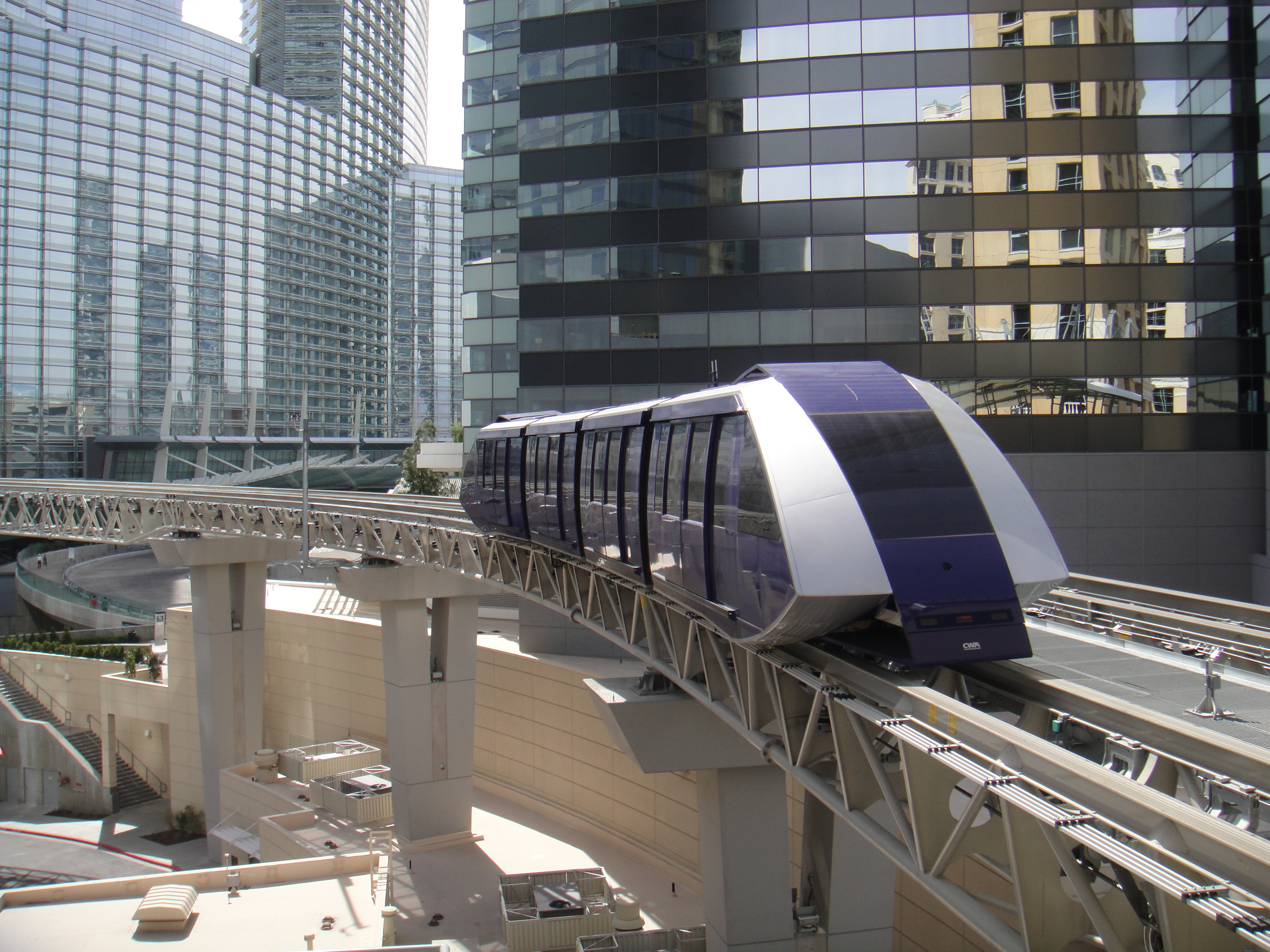
The Aria Express in Las Vegas, US

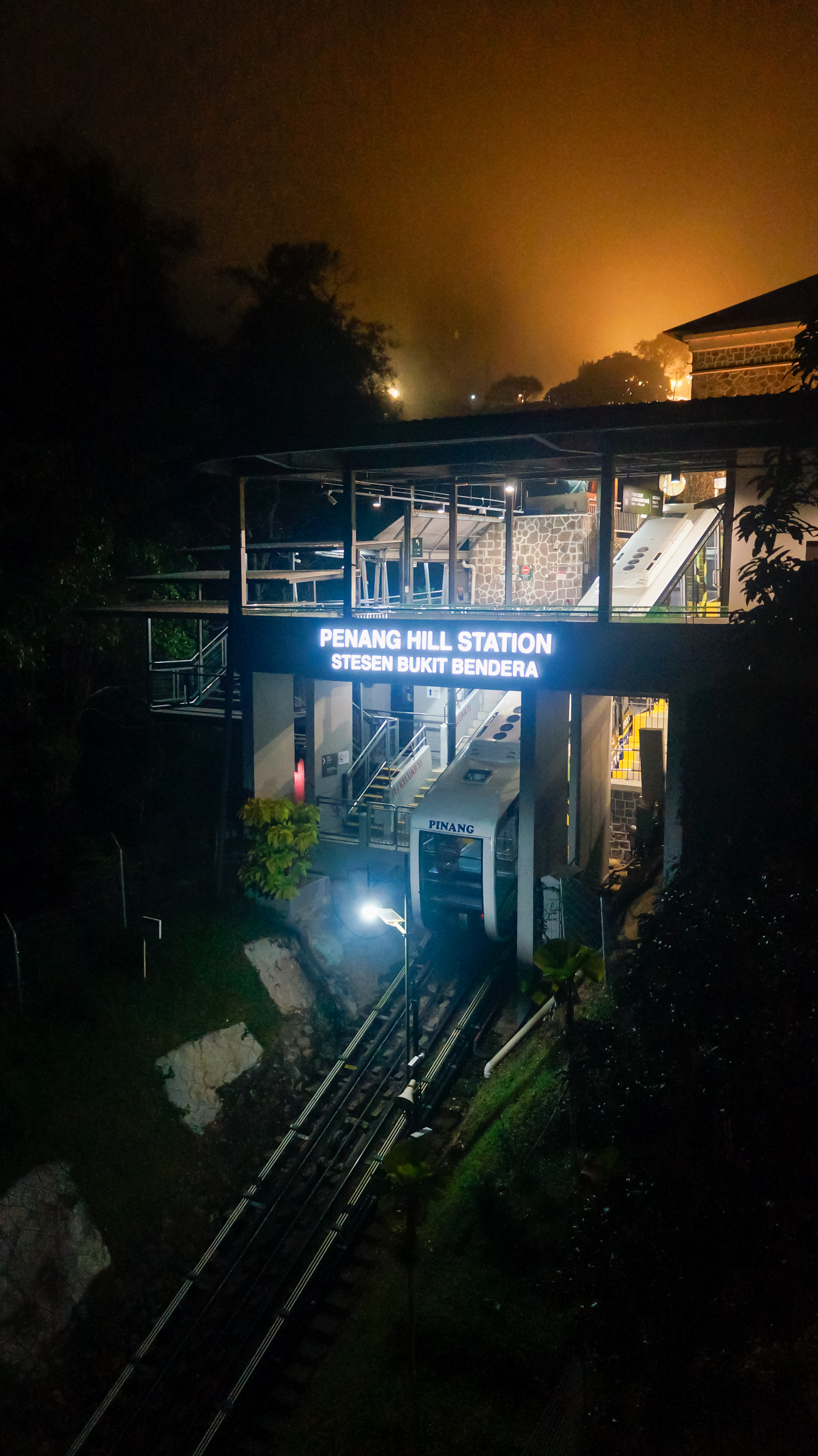
The Penang Hill Railway in Penang, Malaysia.

=== Doppelmayr Transport Technology ===
Doppelmayr Transport Technology GmbH develops and sells material-handling ropeway systems. Initially, these systems were similar to cable cars and chairlifts designed for people, but fitted with specially designed carriers. In the early 2000s, Doppelmayr developed a cable-driven material-handling ropeway called RopeCon. RopeCon is a conveyor system that can transport materials over long distances with little ground disturbance. Such installations can be found in Papua New Guinea, Jamaica, Sudan, Switzerland, and Austria.

=== CWA Constructions ===
CWA Constructions SA of Olten, Switzerland, was acquired by Doppelmayr in 2001. The subsidiary manufactures cabins, such as gondola and people mover cabins, for most Doppelmayr Garaventa Group installations as well as for systems built by other manufacturers.

=== Frey AG Stans ===
Frey AG Stans was founded in 1966 and was acquired by Doppelmayr Garaventa Group in April 2017. The subsidiary manufactures various electrical components and control systems for ropeways.

=== Gassner Stahlbau ===
Gassner Stahlbau GmbH is a subsidiary based in Bürs, Austria, that manufactures steel for pylons, chairs, and suspension, as well as various plastic parts. Gassner Stahlbau has manufactured parts for Doppelmayr since 1969, and was later acquired by Doppelmayr.

=== Input Projektentwicklungs GmbH ===
The Input Projektentwicklungs GmbH division produces mountain systems and amusement rides, such as the experimental Mountain Glider roller coaster in Walibi, Belgium. This project was plagued with problems and the ride was eventually removed.

=== Liftbyggarna ===
In December 2013, the company's Swedish division, Doppelmayr Scandinavia AB, acquired Swedish lift manufacturer Liftbyggarna AB, which has retained its own separate branding. The company was originally founded in 1952.

=== LTW Intralogistics ===
LTW Intralogistics produces automated warehouse technology.
