= Feldmoos-Chli-Titlis Aerial Tramway =

Coordinates: 46.77°N 8.4253°E

Feldmoos-Chli-Titlis Aerial Tramway was an aerial tramway in Switzerland. It was built in 1979 by the Swiss company Habegger between Feldmoos and Chli Titlis for the erection of a communication facility on Chli Titlis. The aerial tramway was used for transporting goods with a weight up to 3.8 tons also for transporting up to 20 people. It used only a single vehicle. After completion of the facility the aerial tramway, which remained property of Habegger, was dismantled in 1986.

The aerial tramway had five towers and a total diagonal length of 4675 metres. The support rope was installed on four towers. The top tower was only used for the return rope, in order to avoid its collision with the suspension ropes. The most important feature of this aerial tramway was that it used the longest span of all aerial tramways ever built with a length of 3,467.1 metres (11,375 ft). For this span field special markings were required: every 100 metres (330 ft), there was a red coil and every 500 metres (1,600 ft) an aircraft warning light. For their power supply a wind generator buffered by accumulators was used, which made technical problems at the beginning. The diameter of the both suspension ropes was 46 millimetres (1.8 in), that of the push rope was 38 millimetres (1.5 in).

The drive was done by a DC engine with 301 kW in the valley station. The maximum speed of the gondola was 6 metres per second (20 ft/s) to 10 metres per second (33 ft/s).

== Technical data ==
- Elevation Valley Station: 1,599.8 metres (5,249 ft)
- Elevation Mountain Station: 3,026.65 metres (9,930.0 ft)
- Horizontal Length: 4,326.65 metres (14,195.0 ft)
- Height difference: 1,429.9 metres (4,691 ft)
- Effective diagonal length: 4,675.1 metres (15,338 ft)
- Average inclination: 33%
- Maximum inclination: 80.5%
- Number Towers: 5 (1 for back rope)
- Maximum Tower height: 37.6 metres (123 ft)
- Largest spanfield: 3,476.2 metres (11,405 ft)
- Maximum speed: 10 metres per second (33 ft/s)
- Diameter suspension rope: 2x 46 millimetres (1.8 in)
- Diameter pushing rope: 38 millimetres (1.5 in)
- Drive: DC engine, 301 kW (max 515 kW)

== Sources ==
Quinche, Daniel (1979), "Pionierleistung im Seilbahnbau (in german)", VST Revue, ?: 20– page 20 page other

- http://www.alpinforum.com/forum/viewtopic.php?f=39&t=15252&p=249754&hilit=Spannweite#p249754
