= Cable Liner =

Cable-propelled automated people mover system

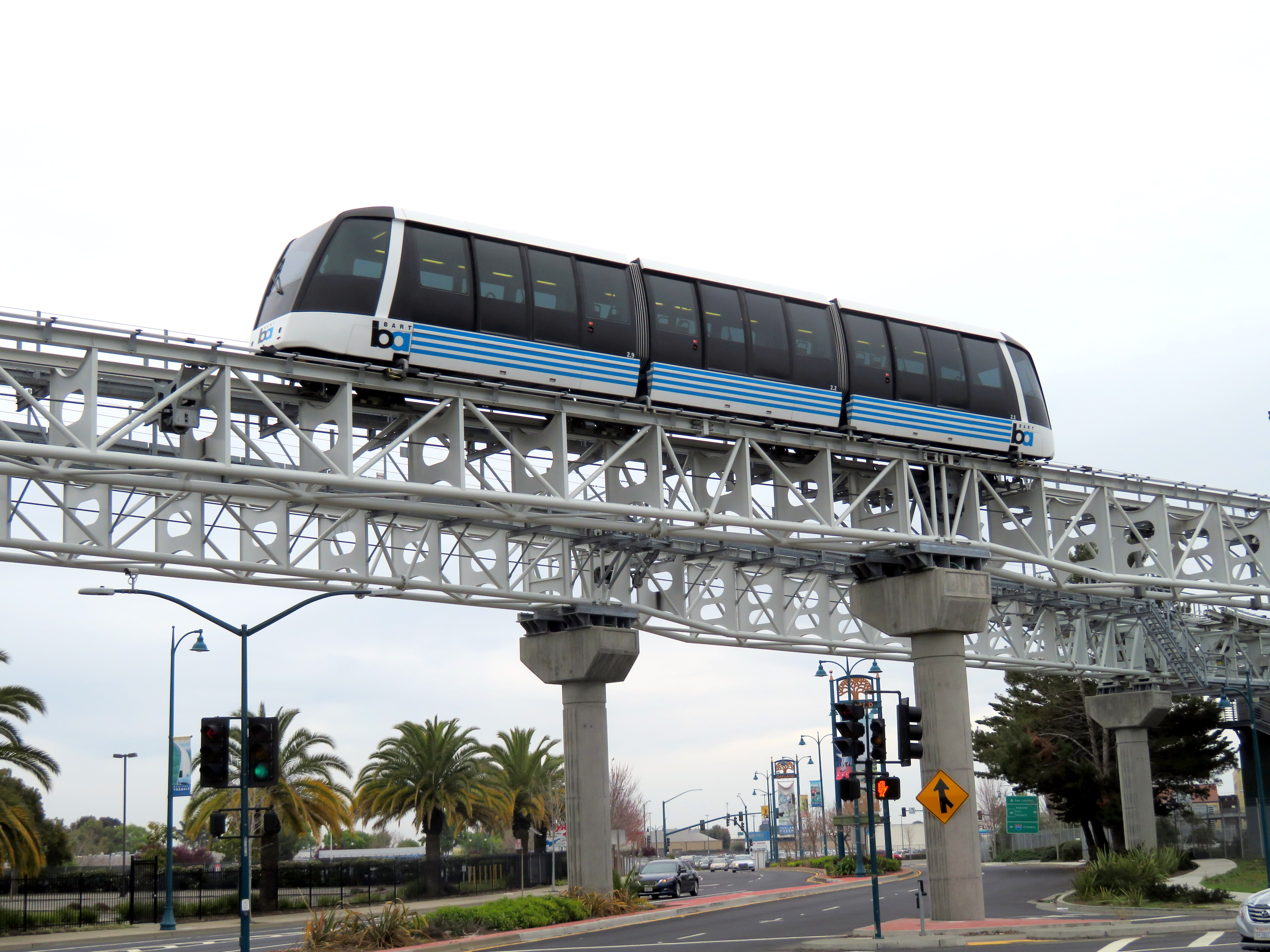
The system at Oakland San Francisco Bay Airport

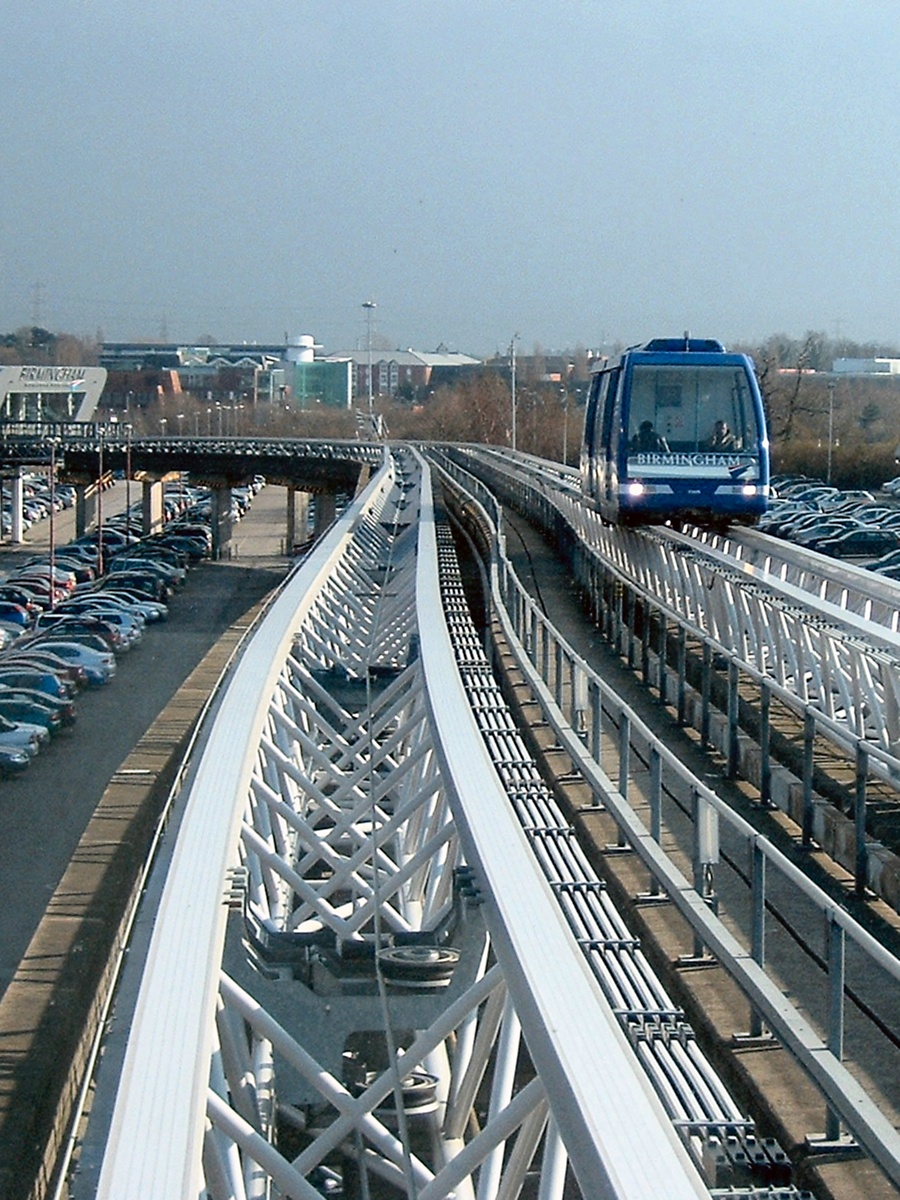
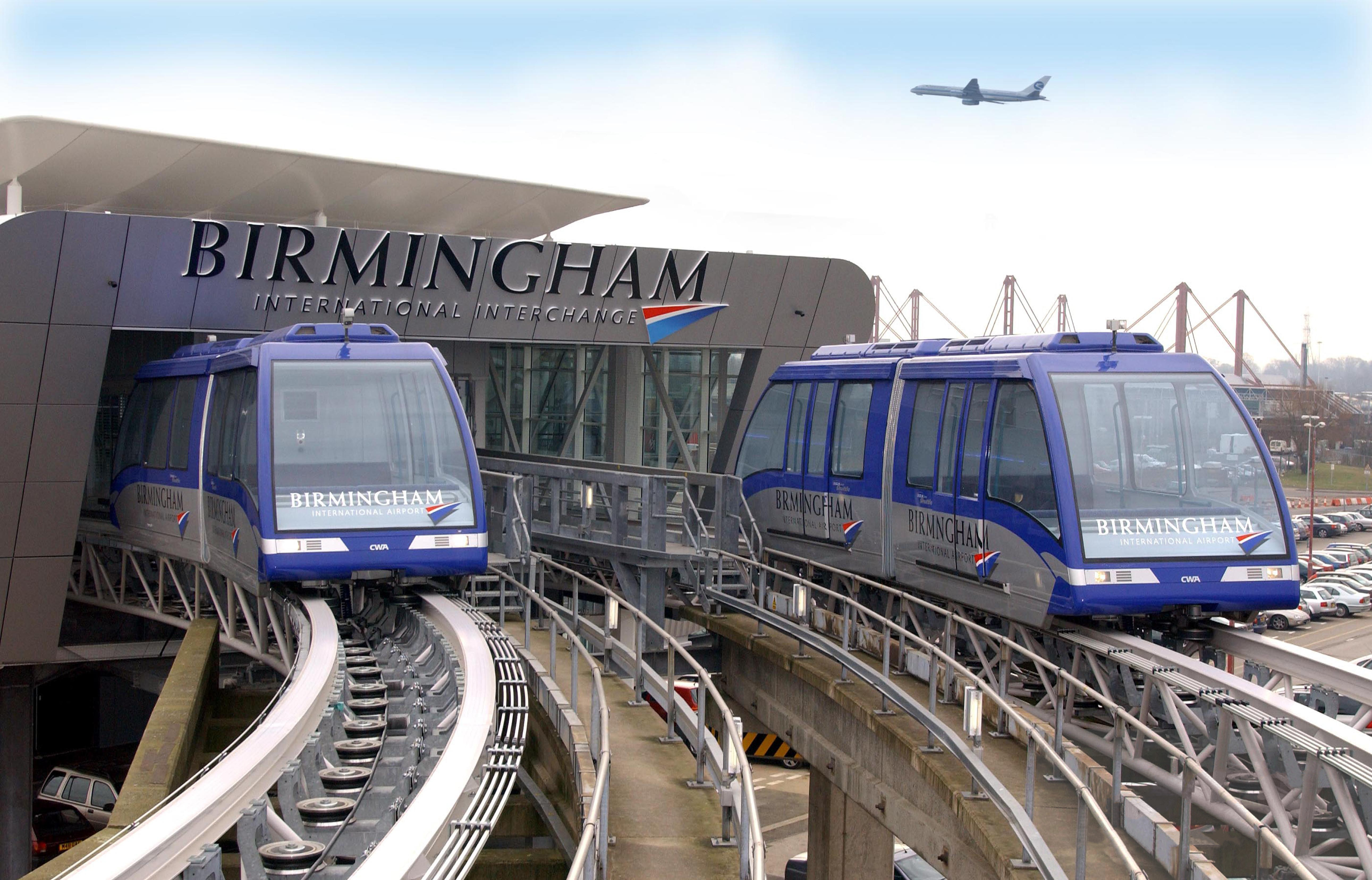
The Birmingham Airport system was built on the old maglev guideway.

The Cable Liner is a range of cable-propelled automated people mover systems by Doppelmayr Cable Car.

It is primarily for use at airports, in city centers, intermodal passenger transport connections, park and ride facilities, campuses, resorts and amusement parks. The design superseded the maglev transport system at Birmingham Airport which was, at the time, the world's only commercial maglev system. The technology was used for the new AirRail Link on the existing maglev guideway to replace the previous system and temporary bus-service shuttle that had been operating in the meantime.

== System features ==
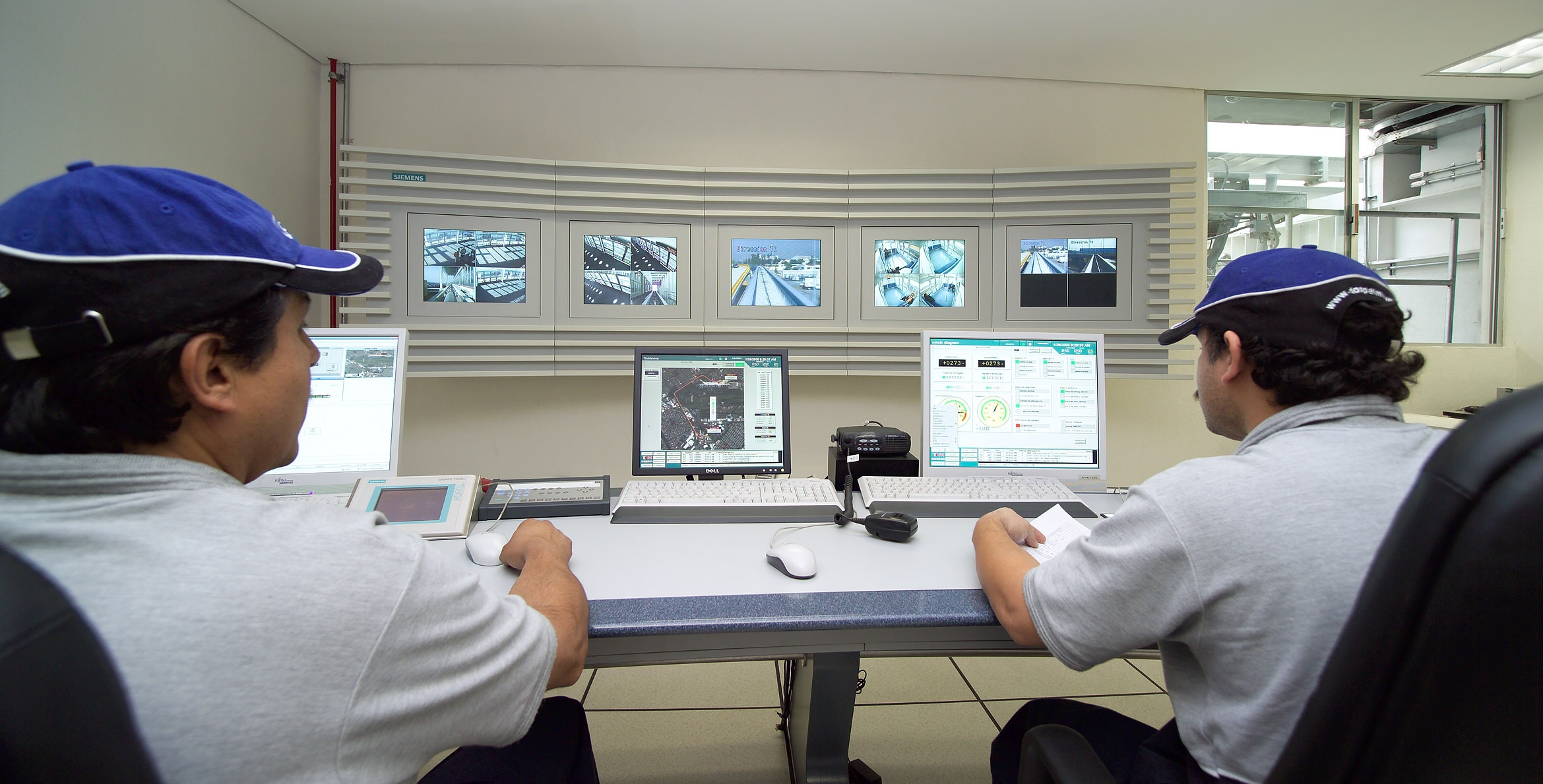
The control room of a Cable Liner system

The automated people mover systems are based on cable-propelled technology. The manufacturer claims distances up to 4 km (2.5 mi) and a peak passenger flow of up to 7,000 passengers per hour per direction are possible.

In a cable-propelled automated people mover system, a central station powers the system, and therefore the train has no on-board drive engines, gearboxes or brakes. A fixed grip assembly connects the train to the cable. The cable propels, accelerates, and decelerates the train.

The system operation is monitored from a central control room; there are no drivers, conductors or operators on board.

The evacuation system is based on an independent stationary diesel emergency drive that would pull a stranded train back to the station, eliminating the need for an emergency walkway. Trains like these can be also used for different purposes, such as moving trailers and barge loaders.

=== Guideway ===
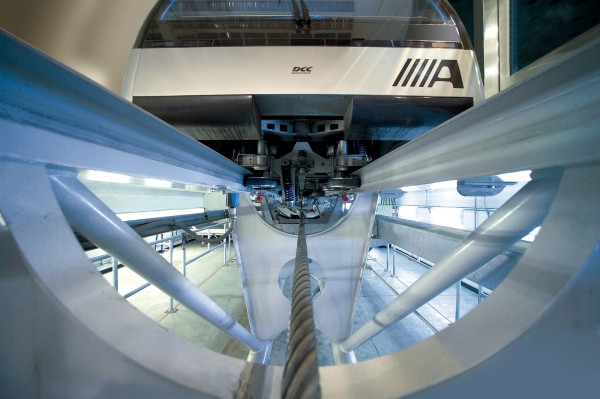
View from inside the guideway, showing the cable propulsion system

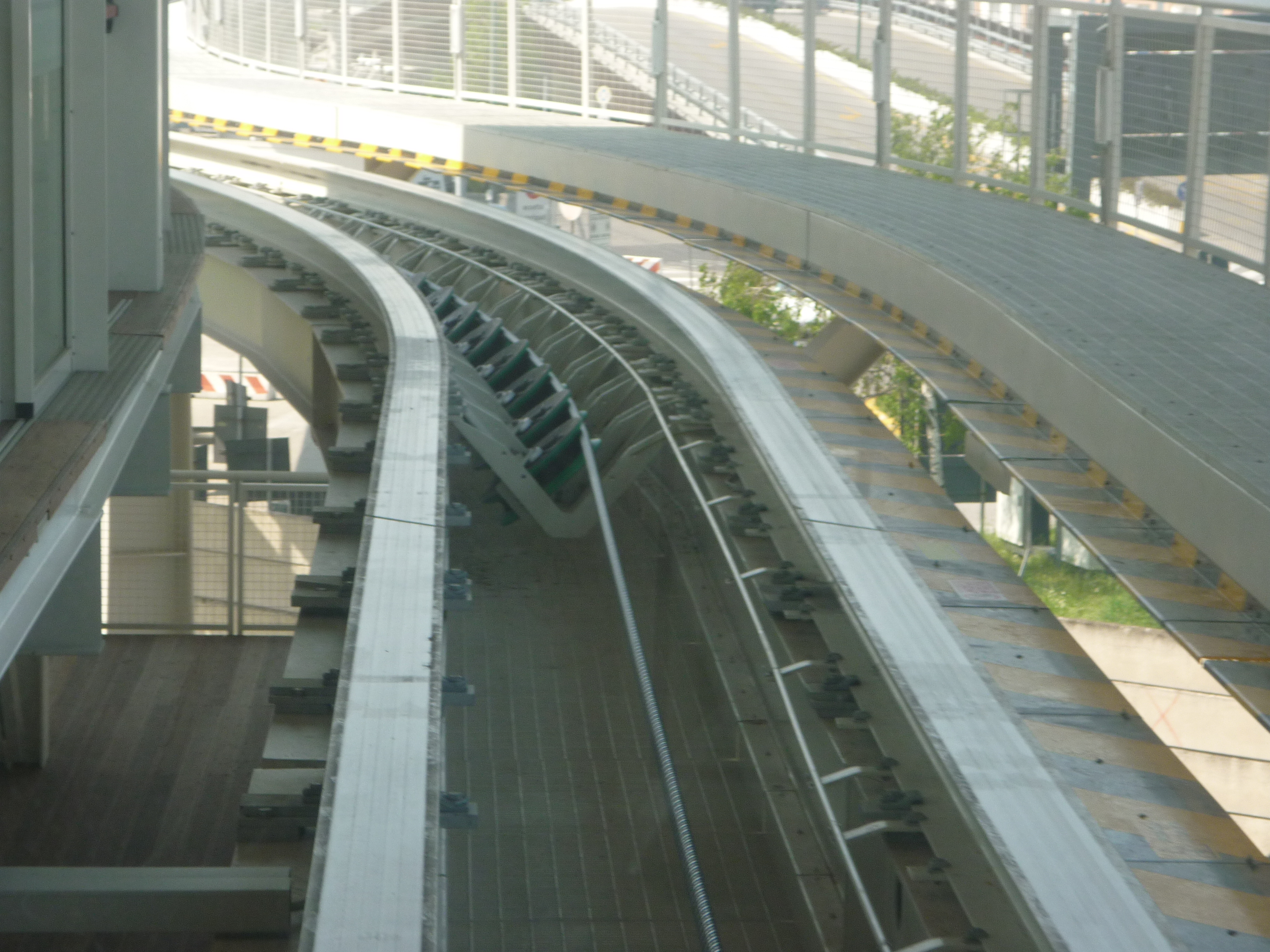
The guideway of the Venice People Mover

The automated people mover uses a self-supporting steel guideway. It is a light steel guideway, which is possible because of the use of lighter trains. The track consists of I-beams which form the running and guiding surfaces. The guideway substructure is a steel framework. The guideway does not require heating in harsh winter conditions. Steel adapters between the steel truss guideway and the concrete columns allow height adjustments to compensate for ground settlements. The track can span more than 67 metres (220 ft) between supports.

Because the guideway substructure is a steel framework and does not have a solid track base, platform screen doors are used at stations.

Diagram of the undercarriages of the trains Green: rails Dark gray: load bearing wheels Red: side stabilizer wheels Blue: cable grip system

=== Vehicles ===
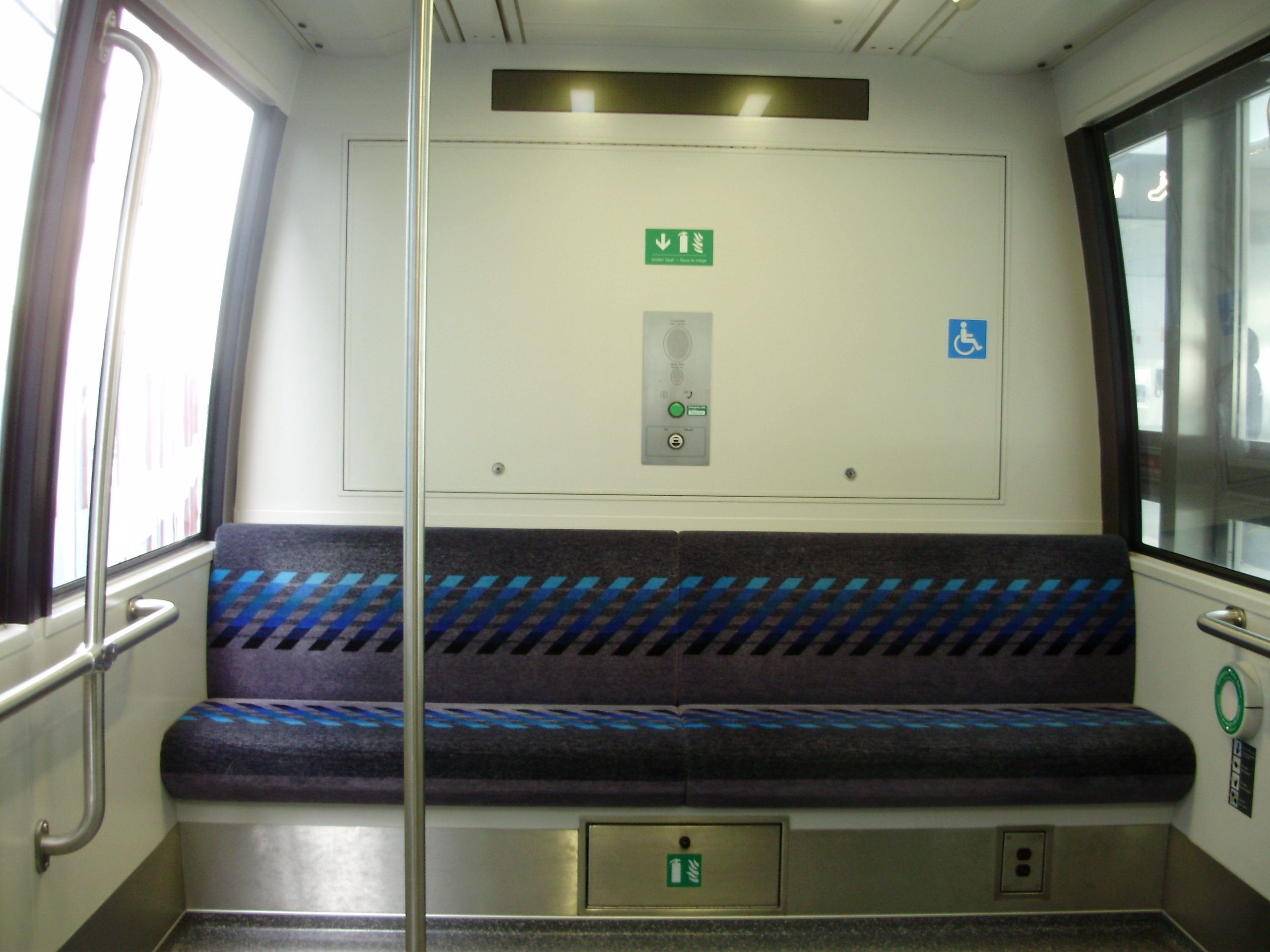
The interior of one of the Toronto Terminal Link vehicles

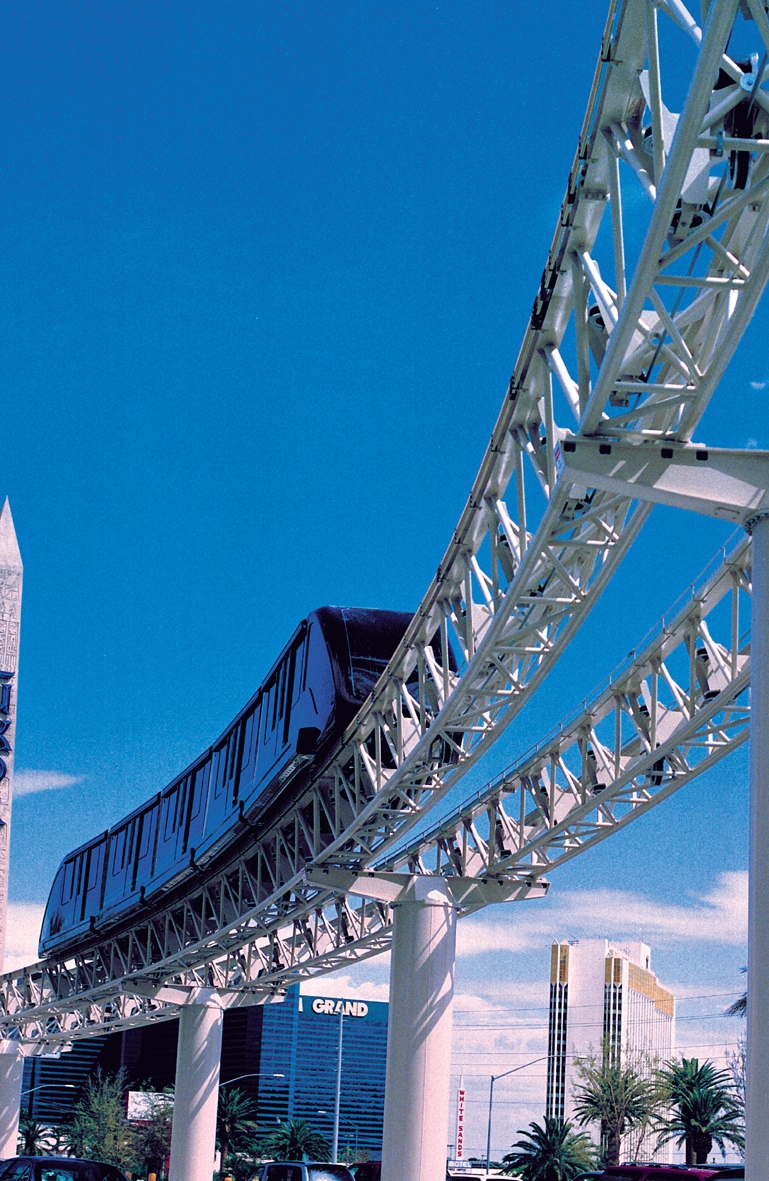
The underside of a Cable Liner guideway

The trains are bidirectional. The car is a self-supporting lightweight design with extruded aluminium box-type profile sections. The integral monocoque structure is bolted and riveted and joint connections are aluminium castings. The aluminium sections are made of high-grade, corrosion-resistant alloy. The undercarriage supports are integrated into the car body and take the form of cavity-sealed tubular steel frames. The design is torsion-free. The vehicle interior is predominantly aluminium, with no heat release.

The vehicles are usually manufactured by Swiss cabin manufacturer CWA Constructions, itself a subsidiary of Doppelmayr Garaventa Group; or Austrian cabin manufacturer Carvatech.

== Configurations ==
There are three main system configurations in use.

=== Shuttle ===
The "Single Shuttle" system is the simplest configuration, with one train operating in both directions on one guideway track.

The "Double Shuttle" configuration features two independent shuttle systems operating side by side on a double guideway track, each with its own haul rope and drive machinery. If one shuttle system fails or is closed for maintenance, the other system may continue to operate. This configuration is designed for system lengths up to 3 km (1.8 mi) and may have several intermediate stations.

The frequency and passenger capacity of both shuttle systems depends largely on the length of the system, and the number of intermediate stations. The passenger capacity additionally depends on the capacity of the train.

=== Bypass ===
In this system, only one guideway enters each end station, but movable switches direct trains onto dual tracks between stations so they can pass one another en route. The bypass must be located approximately in the middle of two terminal end stations and can form part of an intermediate station. This configuration is comparable to the Double Shuttle system in terms of capacity and frequency (headway). Either each train has its own haul rope or both trains are attached to the same haul rope, depending on the application requirements (station configuration, system length, etc.).

=== Pinched Loop ===
This system creates a circular train flow where more than one train moves in the same direction. The principle of this system is based on several rope loops which adjoin and overlap each other in the stations. Every haul rope loop is supplied with its own drive and return machinery. In every station each vehicle of the train has to be disconnected from the current haul rope and connected to the next haul rope in order to continue the circular and synchronized train flow. The haul rope loop change can occur only when all the trains are positioned at the standard stop positions in the stations and are at standstill, and it is carried out while passengers alight and board. Switches installed at the end stations guide the train from one lane of the double-lane track to a single guideway in each end station. During the station stop the switch will be repositioned that the train can leave the station on the other lane of the double-lane track. For the functionality of the Pinched Loop concept the stations have to be approximately equidistant from each other.

== Installations ==
Cable Liner systems around the world

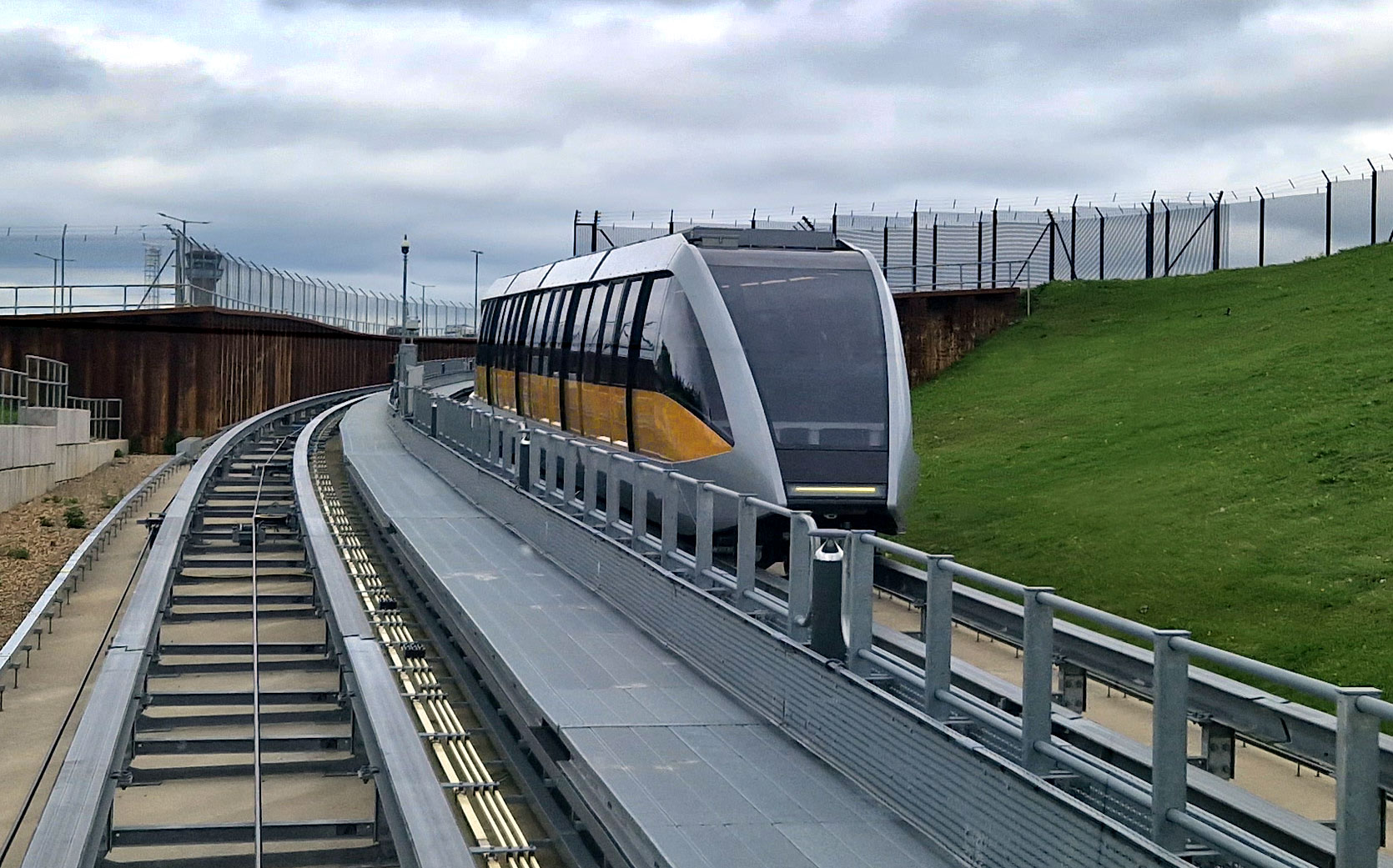
Luton DART, UK

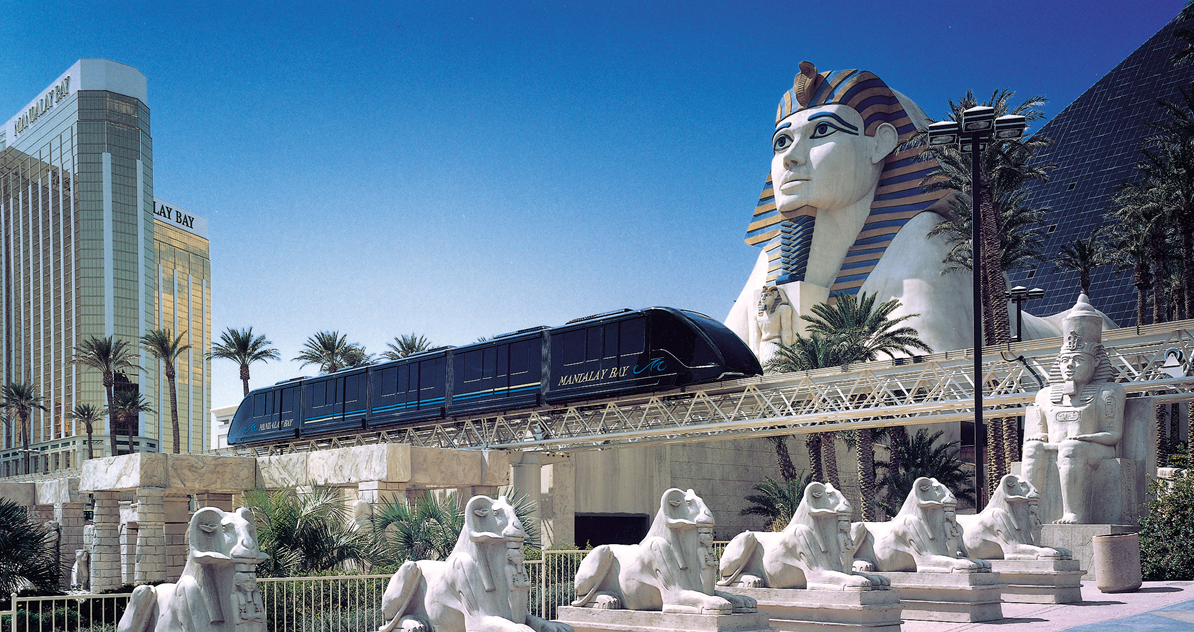
Mandalay Bay Tram, USA

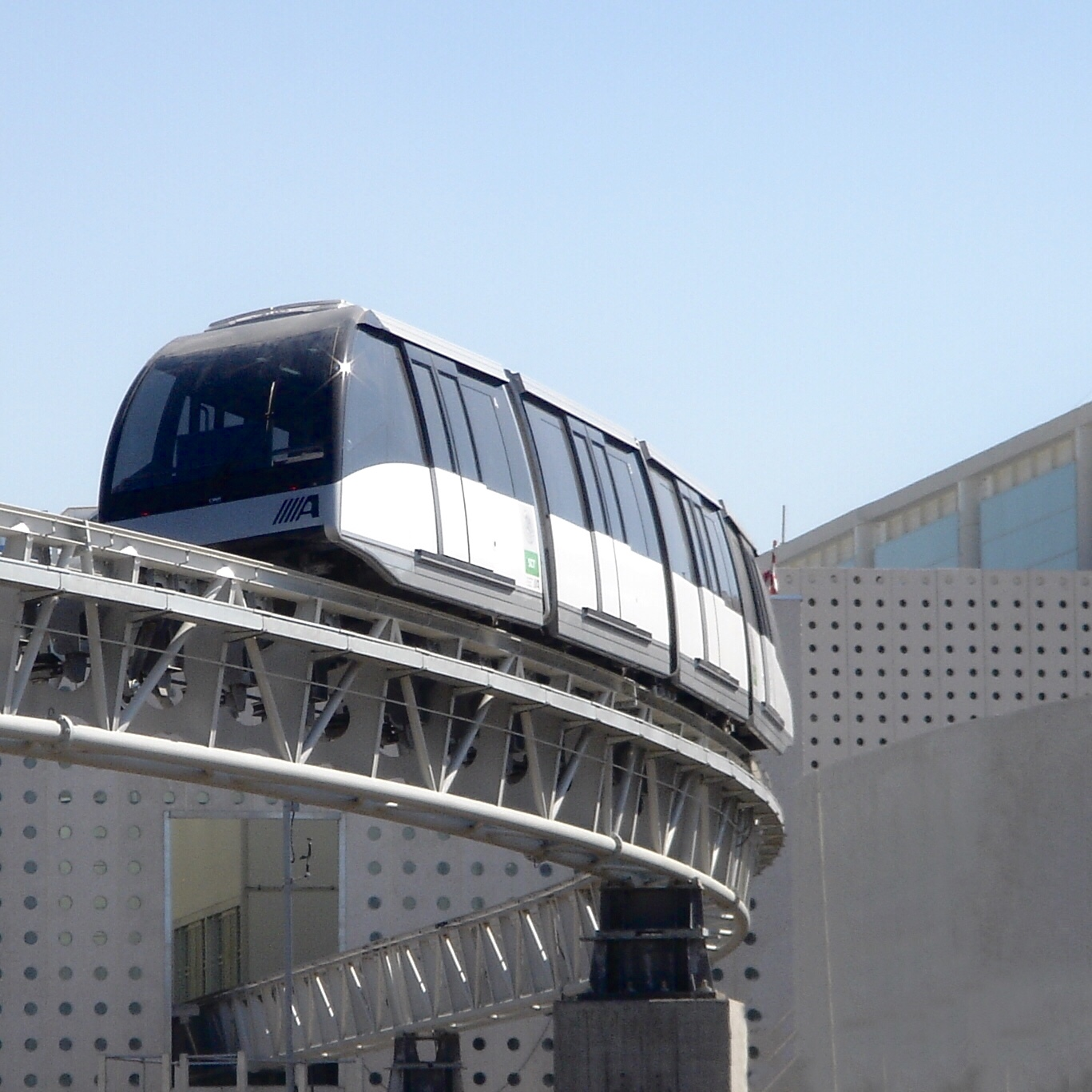
Mexico City Airport Aerotrén, Mexico

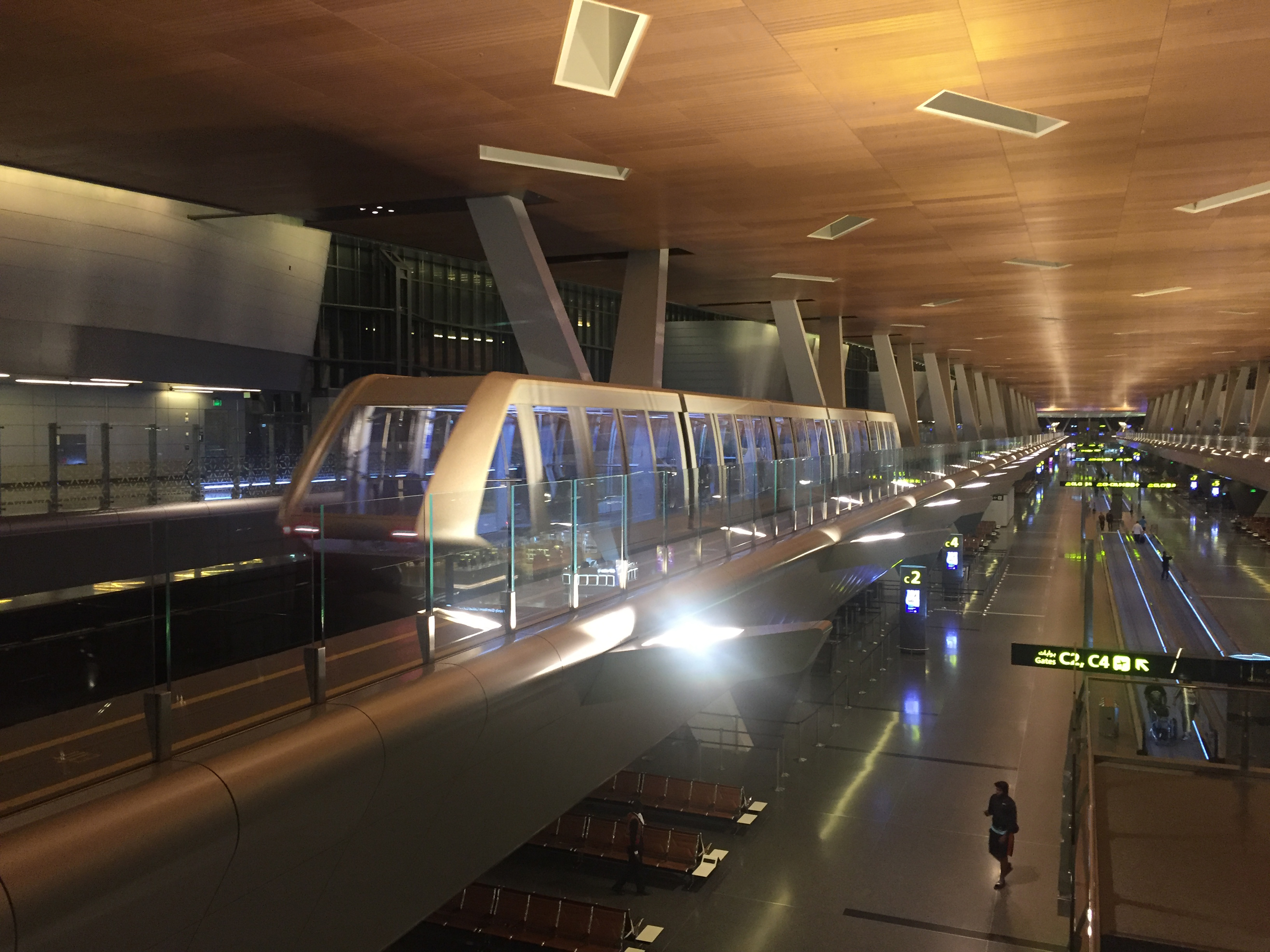
Hamad International Airport Shuttle, Qatar

Country/Region	City/Region	System	Year opened
Canada	Mississauga, Ontario (Toronto)	Terminal Link (Toronto Pearson International Airport)	2007
Italy	Venice	People Mover	2010
Mexico	Mexico City	Aerotrén (Mexico City International Airport)	2010
Qatar	Doha	Hamad International Airport APM	2016
Russia	Khimki, Moscow Oblast (Moscow)	Automated Passenger Transportation System (Sheremetyevo International Airport)	2018
United Kingdom	Bickenhill – Solihull (Birmingham)	Air-Rail Link	2003
United Kingdom	Luton, Bedfordshire (London)	Luton DART (London Luton Airport)	2023
United States	Paradise, Nevada (Las Vegas Valley)	Mandalay Bay Tram	1999
United States	Paradise, Nevada (Las Vegas Valley)	Aria Express	2009
United States	Oakland, California	Oakland Airport Connector (Oakland International Airport)	2014
Venezuela	Caracas	Cabletren Bolivariano	2013

== See also ==
- MiniMetro
- Otis Hovair
- SK (people mover)
