= Aerotrén =

People mover at Mexico City International Airport

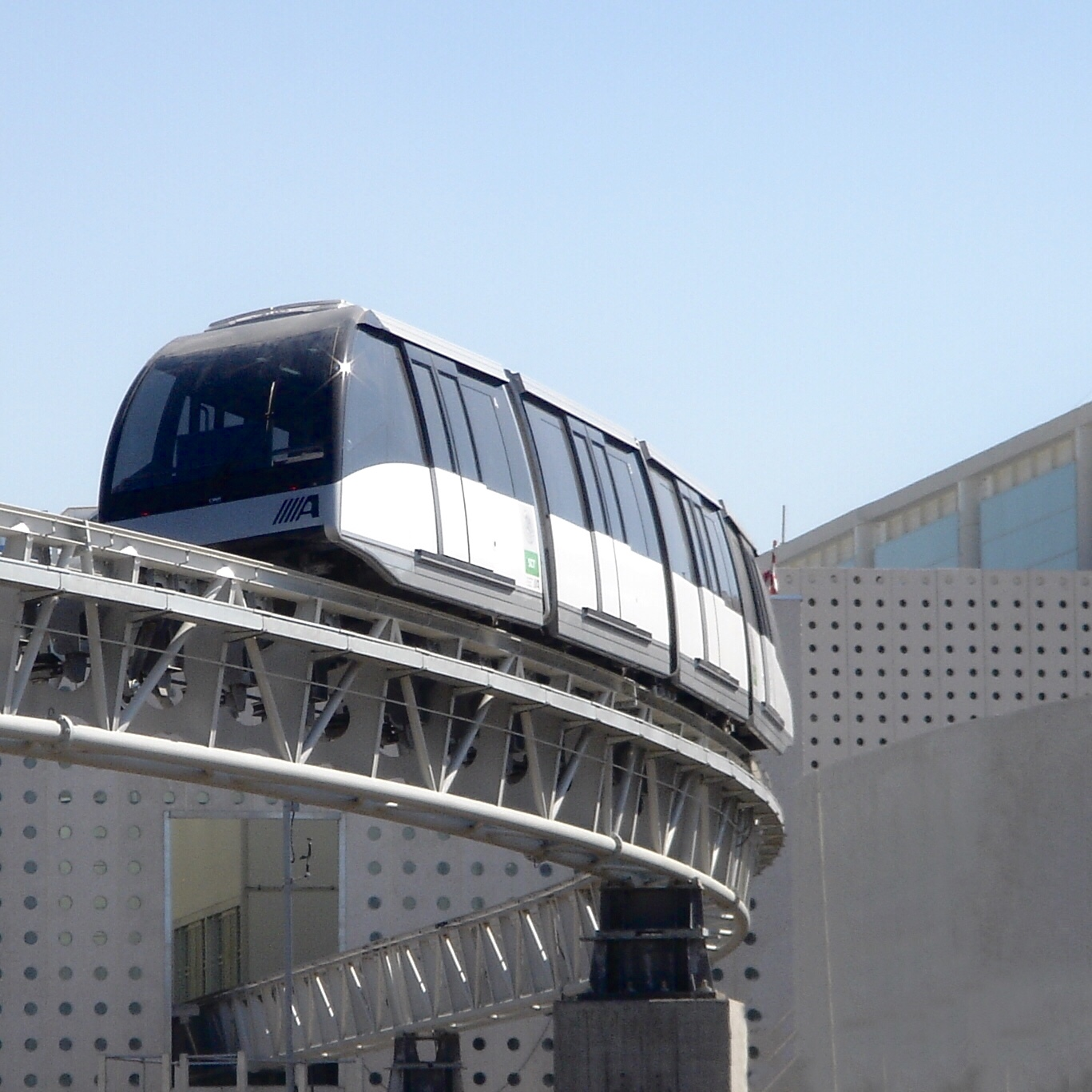
- The four-car Aerotrén outside the Terminal 2 station

Overview
- Status: In operation
- Owner: Mexico City International Airport
- Locale: Mexico City
- Termini: Terminal 1; Terminal 2
- Connecting lines: Terminal Aérea
- Stations: 2

Service
- Type: People mover

History
- Opened: 15 November 2007

Technical
- Line length: 3 km (1.9 mi)
- Number of tracks: 1
- Character: Elevated, cable-hauled system
- Operating speed: 45 km/h (28 mph)

The Aerotrén is a cable-propelled people mover operating at Mexico City International Airport, near Mexico City, in Mexico. The three-kilometre (1.9 mi) automated people mover (APM) provides a link between Terminal 1 and Terminal 2.

Opened in 2007, it was part of a major expansion to the airport, which is the busiest in Latin America. The link is only designed to transfer passengers connecting between flights, who must be in possession of and show a valid boarding pass.

== Background ==
The Aerotrén airport link at Benito Juarez International Airport connects Terminal 1 with the new Terminal 2 which had been constructed on the opposite end of the runway from the existing terminal. The system is able to transport 540 transfer passengers per hour per direction (pphpd).

=== Construction ===
The Mexico City International Airport Automated People Mover System Project was started on August 12, 2005, when a contract was signed between the airport owners Aeropuertos y Servicios Auxiliares (ASA) and DCC Doppelmayr Cable Car. The system was completed by November 2007 at a price of €52 million.

The system was built and designed in a joint venture with Ingenieros Civiles y Asociados (ICA), Mexico's largest construction company.

The area around Mexico City suffers from soil settlement, and this had to be allowed for. The elevated guideway structure has the ability to be adjusted for ground settlements. Steel adapters between the steel truss and the concrete columns allow later height adjustments to compensate for any ground movement.

=== Technology ===
A single-track, single train, Cable Liner shuttle design was chosen. The installed system is 3,025 metres (9,925 ft) in length and operates at a speed of 45 kilometres per hour (28 mph) between the two terminal stations. Vehicles are connected to a cable, driven from under one of the stations, that propels, accelerates, and decelerates the train.

The train is composed of four cars, each holding 26 passengers for a total of 104 passengers per train. An option was included for lengthening the original four car train to six cars, providing an increase from 540 pphpd up to 800 pphpd.

=== Operations ===
Only connecting passengers can use the system, who must have a valid flight boarding pass to board. Travel time is 5:45 minutes and the train pauses (dwells) for 60 seconds on each station. When the system closes for maintenance, passengers are ferried between both terminals in buses.

== See also ==
- AirRail Link, DCC's first airport system in Birmingham, UK
- Terminal Link, another Cable Liner system in Toronto, Canada
