= Aria Express =

People mover in Paradise, Nevada

Coordinates: 36.10800°N 115.17529°W

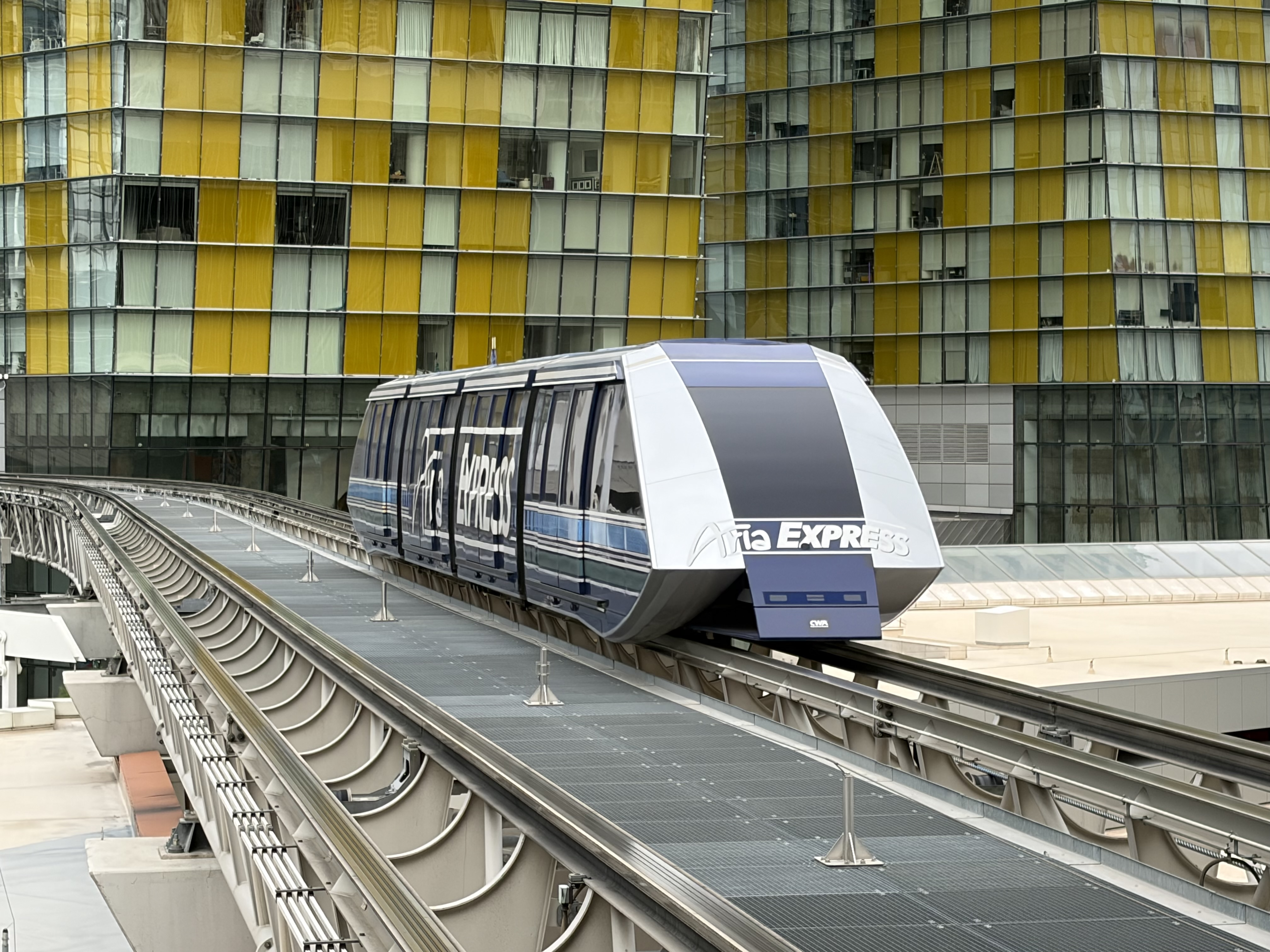

Overview
- Locale: Las Vegas Strip, Paradise, NV, USA
- Transit type: People mover
- Number of stations: 3

Operation
- Began operation: 2009
- Character: Fully elevated
- Rolling stock: Cable Liner
- Number of vehicles: 2
- Train length: 4

Technical
- System length: 2,034 ft (620.0 m)
- Top speed: 23.5 miles per hour (37.8 km/h)

Aria Express (formerly and also known as the CityCenter Tram) is a 2,034-foot-long (620 m) people mover located on the Las Vegas Strip.

The system's three stations connect the Las Vegas casinos Park MGM and Bellagio with CityCenter. The Park MGM station additionally serves the Aria Resort and Casino. The CityCenter station is located above The Shops at Crystals and also serves other CityCenter properties such as Waldorf Astoria. The northern Bellagio station also serves the Vdara. All of the properties served by the Aria Express are operated or were developed by MGM Resorts International.

The Aria Express is free to ride and operates daily from 08:00 to 02:00.

== Technical ==
The system consists of two elevated tracks 82 feet (25 m) above the ground, each with a single shuttle train. Like the related Mandalay Bay Tram, the system was built by Doppelmayr Cable Car using the Cable Liner technology. It opened to the public in December 2009.

Each of the two trains consist of four cars with a capacity of 33 people each, for a total capacity of 132 people per train. It is able to move 3,300 passengers per hour per direction. It has a maximum operating speed of 23.5 miles per hour (37.8 km/h).

== See also ==
- Las Vegas Monorail
- Mandalay Bay Tram
- Hard Rock-Treasure Island Tram
- Circus Sky Shuttle
