= Mandalay Bay Tram =

People mover in Paradise, Nevada

Coordinates: 36.0968°N 115.1739°W

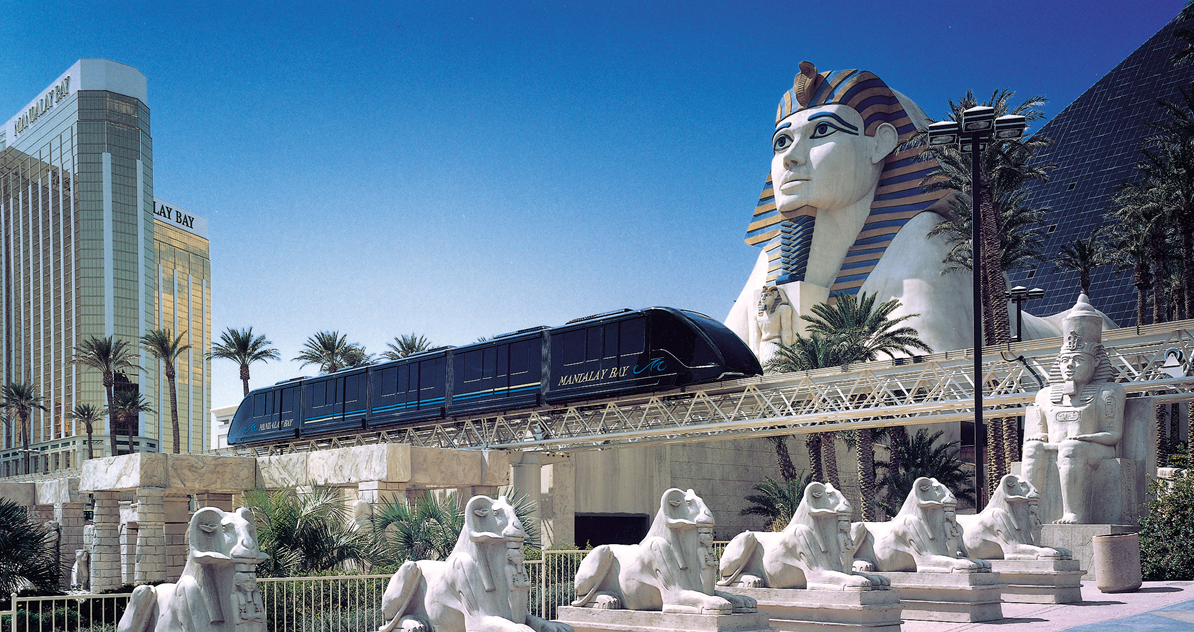
- An express tram passing Luxor

Overview
- Locale: Las Vegas Strip, Paradise, NV, USA
- Termini: Excalibur North; Mandalay Bay
- Stations: 4
- Website: https://mandalaybay.mgmresorts.com/en/amenities/transportation.html

Service
- Type: AGT
- Services: 2
- Rolling stock: 2 × DCC 5-car Cable Liner
- Ridership: 1.3K pphpd

History
- Opened: April 9, 1999

Technical
- Line length: 2,749 ft (838 m)
- Number of tracks: 2
- Character: Fully elevated
- Highest elevation: 16–26 ft (4.9–7.9 m)

The Mandalay Bay Tram is a 2,749-foot-long (838 m) people mover that opened on April 9, 1999, on the Las Vegas Strip in Paradise, Nevada. It was constructed to connect three gaming hotels belonging to the MGM Mirage Group. The line carries passengers from the major Tropicana – Las Vegas Boulevard intersection, via the Excalibur Hotel and Casino and Luxor Hotel to the Mandalay Bay Resort and Casino at the southern end.

The dual-track system is cable-driven and free for the public to use. The western track has intermediate station stops. The eastern track only has stops at either end of the line – Mandalay Bay and Excalibur. If only one train is running, it is the western track and it runs express to Mandalay Bay going south, but makes all stops returning north. During peak periods when both trains are running, the western track will stop at all stations along its track, while the eastern track provides express service.

== Description ==
The Mandalay Bay Tram is a Cable Liner Shuttle installation consisting of an elevated 2,749-foot-long (838 m) guideway with two completely independent shuttle systems running side-by-side. The guideway alignment passes above street level at a height of between 16 and 26 ft (4.9 and 7.9 m). One system serves all four stations along the route, while the other provides an express link between the two end stations.

Each system consists of one train with five cars. The individual cars carry 32 passengers each; thus each train has a total capacity of 160 passengers. System 1 carries 1,300 passengers per hour per direction (pphpd) and has four stations; system 2 carries 1,900 pphpd, and has two stations (and four passengers per square meter). The trains run back empty in the opposite direction between each passenger-carrying run. In the first year of operation, the system carried approximately 21 million passengers. The train cars are firmly attached to a haul rope and run on pneumatic tires to ensure extremely quiet operation. The train can reach a travel speed of 22 mph (36 km/h) and the guideway is an open, modular steel tube truss structure. The custom train design is one of the highlights; the trains have been filmed for television commercials, and the Mandalay Bay Group patented the design.

== History ==
The Mandalay Bay Tram project was started on September 2, 1998, when the contract with DCC Doppelmayr Cable Car was signed. The Cable Liner Shuttle was completed in April 1999, after only nine months from the notice to proceed and had a contract amount of US$16 million.

== Operations ==
There are two independent 2,749-foot-long (838 m) shuttle systems side-by-side, built on an elevated modular steel truss guideway. The five-car trains are propelled by stationary drive machinery, controlling train acceleration, speed, propulsion and braking. They have a capacity of 32 passengers per vehicle (160 passengers/train) and travel at a speed of 22 mph (35 km/h). The headway is 220 seconds and the dwell time is 50 seconds.

Each of the two tracks has its own independent 1.3-inch (33 mm) diameter wire rope, containing a single splice to make it into a loop. The wire was manufactured by Austria Draht Wire Rope, then spliced and tested in situ by Richard Ryer Incorporated.

The tram runs during the hours of 10:00 am and 12:00 am daily.

== See also ==
- Las Vegas Monorail
- Aria Express
- Hard Rock-Treasure Island Tram
- Circus Sky Shuttle
