= Luton DART =

Automated train to Luton Airport in England

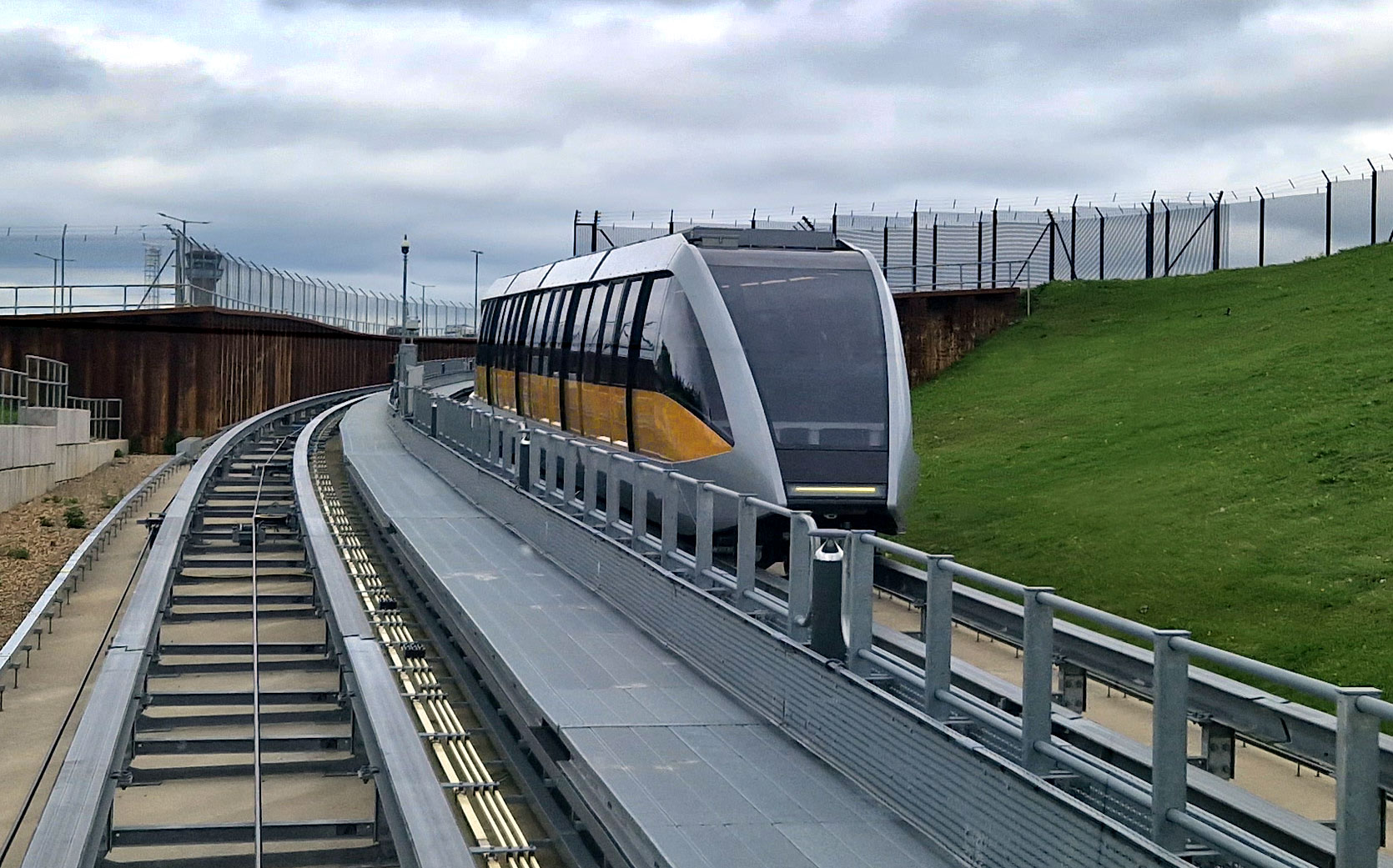
- A Luton DART train in operation

Overview
- Owner: Luton Borough Council
- Transit type: Automated guided people mover (light metro)
- Number of lines: 1
- Number of stations: 2
- Annual ridership: 2.7 million
- Website: www.lutondart.com

Operation
- Began operation: 10 March 2023; 3 years ago
- Number of vehicles: 2
- Headway: 225 seconds

Technical
- System length: 2,080 metres (1.29 miles)
- No. of tracks: 2
- Top speed: 50.4 km/h (31.3 mph)
System map
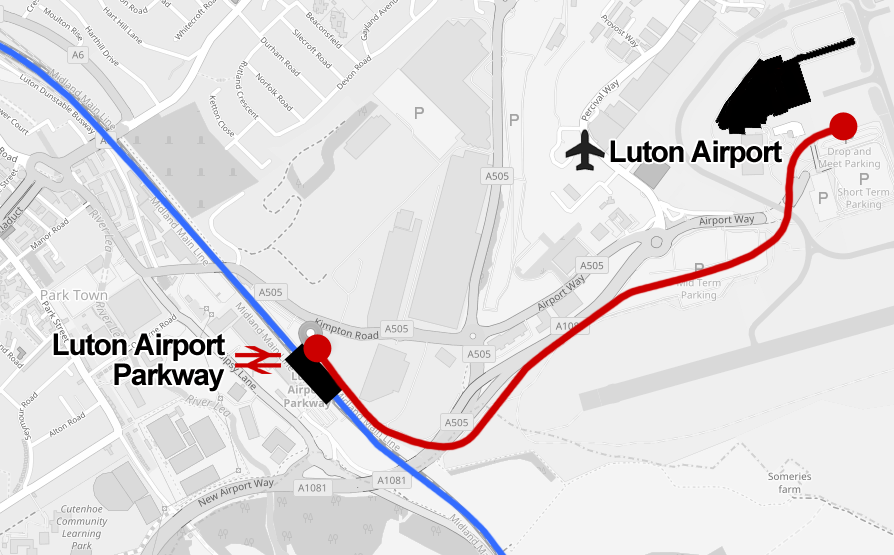

The Luton DART is an airport rail link in Luton, England, which connects Luton Airport Parkway station and Luton Airport (a.k.a. London Luton Airport) using a Cable Liner automated people mover system. DART is an acronym for Direct Air–Rail Transit. The line, which opened in March 2023, replaces the shuttle bus service, with the aim of reducing road congestion. Luton Airport is part of the system of six airports serving London; with East Midlands Railway (EMR) service from Central London's St Pancras railway station to Luton Airport Parkway station, the combined EMR-DART system reduces journey times from St Pancras to the airport terminal to 32 minutes.

== History ==
=== Background ===
From the 1950s and 1960s, Luton Airport experienced an increase in business as a result of the growing package holiday market. Although the Midland Main Line passed within 1 mile (1.6 km) of the airport, there was no dedicated railway station and public transport connections to Luton Airport were limited. A shuttle bus service operated from Luton railway station, to convey rail passengers 2 miles (3.2 km) from Luton town centre to the airport terminal.

Luton Airport Parkway railway station opened in 1999, providing rail connections to central and south London, Gatwick Airport and Brighton on the Thameslink route, as well as services to the East Midlands. Although the new station was closer to the airport – 1 mile (1.6 km) to the west – it was still necessary to run a shuttle bus transfer service.

The shuttle bus was considered to be unsatisfactory, and proposals were developed to replace the bus service with a new rail link. Several schemes were considered, including a 2007 proposal to replace the shuttle buses with segregated tracked transit conveyors, and in 2015, a heavy rail spur link to the airport was also being considered. The steep incline from the airport – approximately 40 metres (130 ft) downhill to Luton Airport Parkway station – presented engineering challenges to building any heavy rail link over the short distance to the airport terminal.

In April 2016, London Luton Airport Ltd (LLAL) announced a scheme to create a light rail/automated guided people mover connection between the airport and Luton Airport Parkway station. It was envisaged that the introduction of a light-rail link would reduce the journey time between London St Pancras and the airport terminal to less than 30 minutes. At launch, that figure is 32 minutes.

=== Construction ===
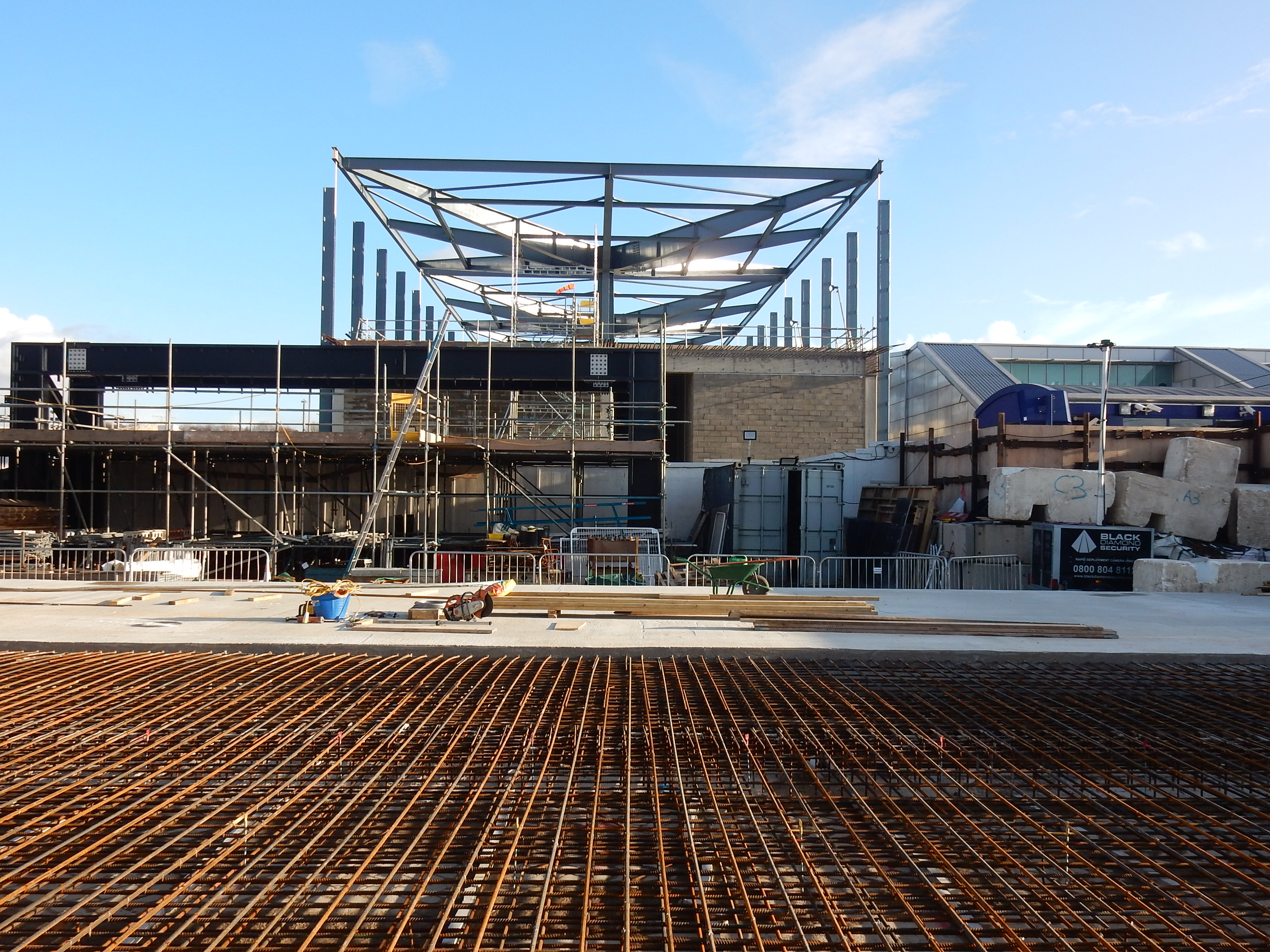
Luton Airport Parkway DART station under construction (February 2020)

The Luton DART link was approved by Luton Borough Council in June 2017. Construction work commenced in April 2018, contracted to a VolkerFitzpatrick / Kier Group joint venture.

The project involved construction of bridges over the A1081 road and tunnels, along with two stations in phase 1. The first station was built at Bartlett Square in Napier Park on the east side of Luton Airport Parkway station, and the final station at the airport. In 2018, it was announced that the system would be a Cable Liner, manufactured by the Austrian transit manufacturer, Doppelmayr Cable Car (DCC), who also have a contract to operate the system for the first five years. The vehicles were built by the Austrian cabin manufacturer Carvatech.

In December 2019, a ready-constructed, 80-metre (260 ft)-long, 1,000-tonne (980-long-ton; 1,100-short-ton) curved bridge was moved into place over the A1081 road on large jacks. Construction work on the line was halted briefly in April 2020 during the COVID-19 pandemic over concerns related to Coronavirus Health Protection Regulations, but resumed after a safety assessment. The cable propulsion system was completed in February 2020 and work then began to install the people mover vehicles on the guide rails. A new light rail terminus building has been constructed next to the railway station.

Testing of the transit vehicles began in 2021. In August of that year, reports emerged of problems experienced with the traction or the pulley system during testing, and that a DART vehicle had become derailed. This was denied by LLAL.

=== Opening ===
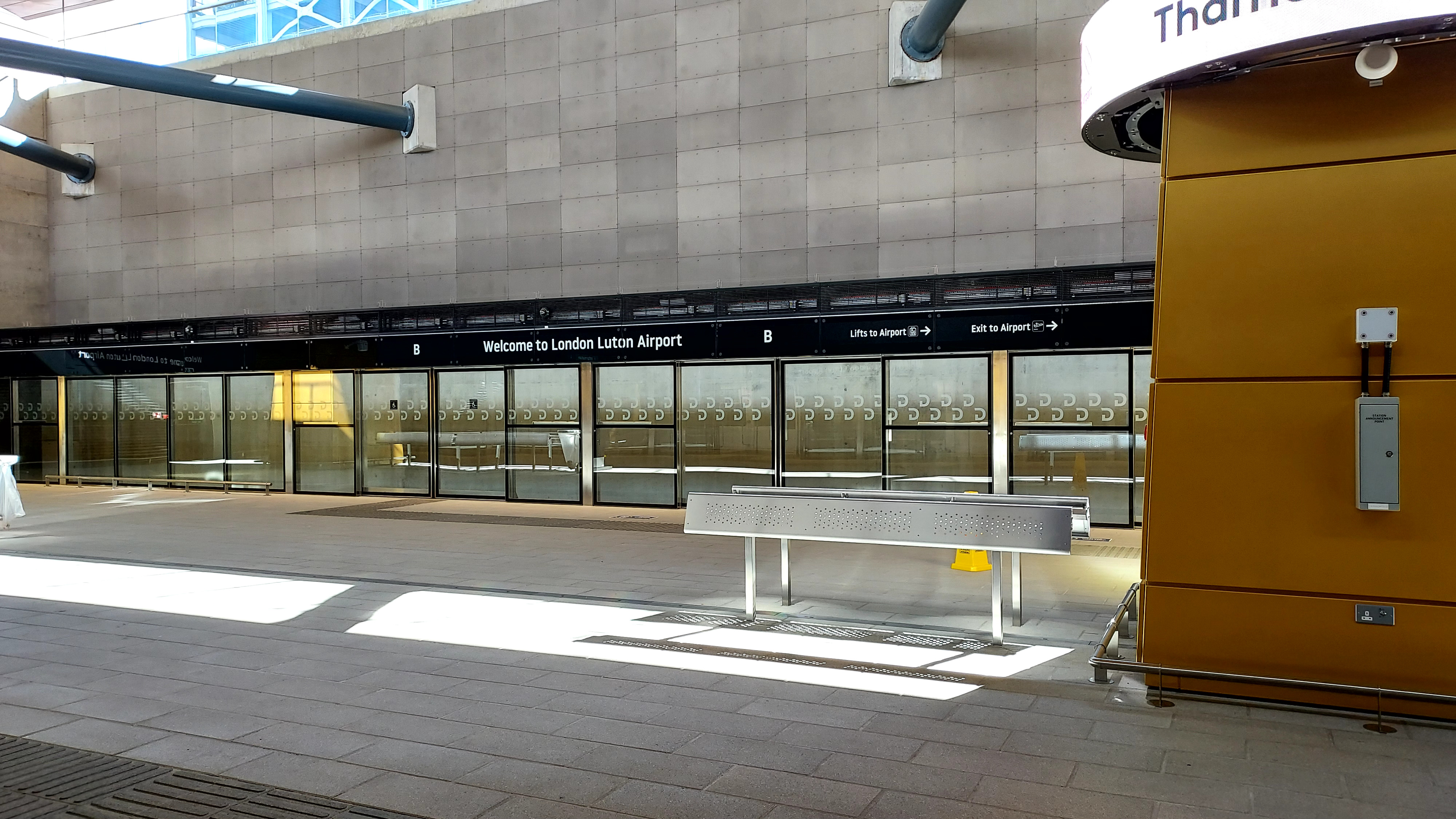
Luton Airport station platform

The system was originally scheduled to open in 2021. Following delays resulting from the COVID-19 pandemic, the opening date was revised to late 2022. The planned opening was later delayed due to further technical testing and development of the ticketing system. A member of Luton Borough Council's overview and scrutiny board called for an independent investigation into Luton DART's two-year delay and £90 million budget increase.

On 6 December 2022, King Charles III visited the Luton DART during a royal visit to the town. He unveiled a plaque commemorating his visit before travelling on the new transit system.

Passenger trials began in February 2023, with a second batch of trials announced for March. The service opened to all passengers for four hours per day on 10 March. It subsequently opened for 24 hours per day on 27 March 2023.

== Operation ==
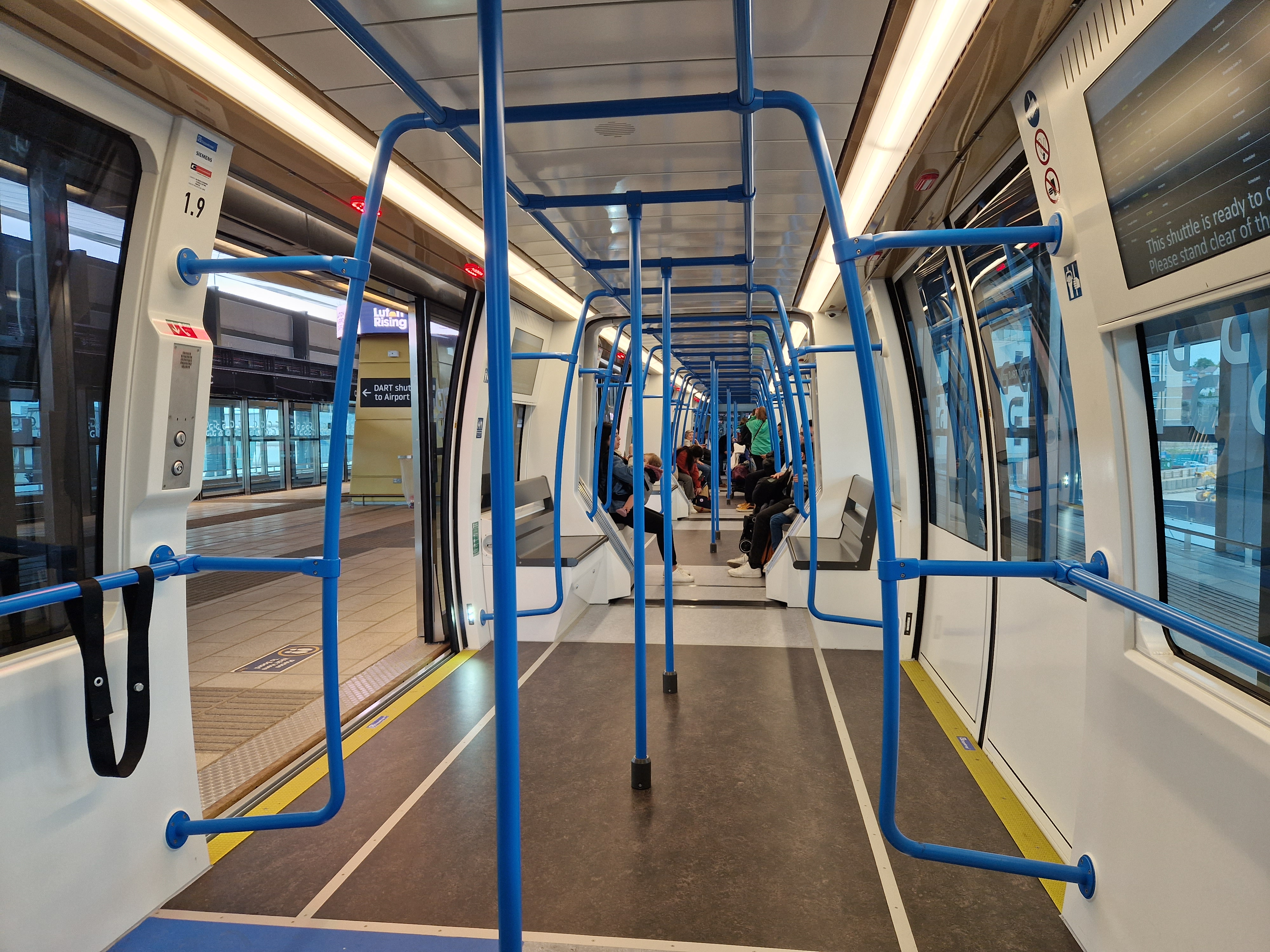
Interior of DART shuttle train

Luton DART is operated by a subsidiary company wholly owned by London Luton Airport Limited (LLAL, trading as Luton Rising). It operates 24 hours a day, with trains running every four minutes throughout the day and every eight to 15 minutes at other times. The journey time is under four minutes.

=== Route ===
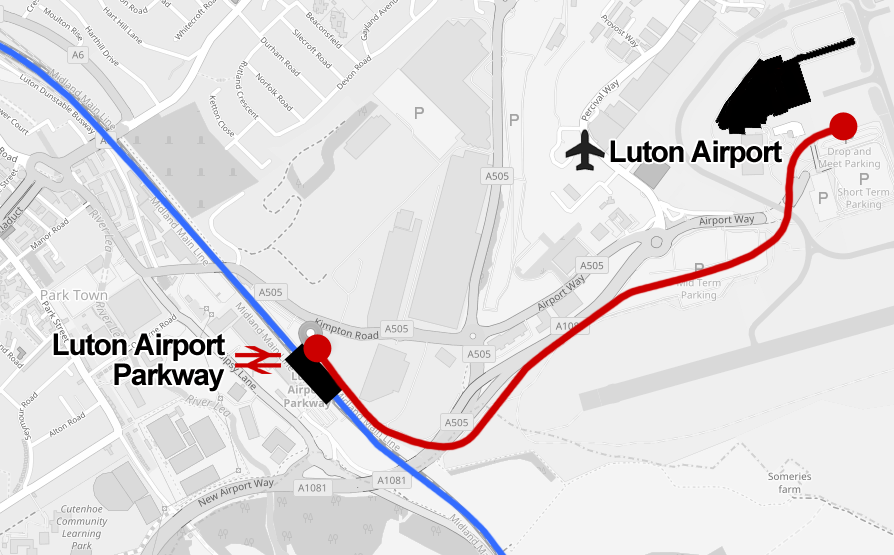
Map of the transit route

The 2.1 km (1.3 mi) DART line begins at Luton DART Parkway, a purpose-built station adjoining Luton Airport Parkway railway station, which provides an interchange with East Midlands Railway and Thameslink passenger rail services. The DART platforms are located on a new upper level above the current station, and are connected to the main-line rail platforms via a new footbridge and concourse, complete with lifts and escalators. The concourse includes separate barrier lines for main line rail and DART, with an unpaid area in between.

DART vehicles head southeastwards along a 350-metre (380-yard) viaduct. After crossing the A1081 road, the vehicles curve eastwards along a 1.1 km (0.68-mile) cutting and concrete trough before entering a 350-metre cut-and-cover tunnel under the airport apron.

The eastern airport terminus is located at a new subterranean station underneath the drop-off area in front of the terminal building. Access to a surface level concourse and barrier line is provided by escalators and lifts; the airport terminal is a 150 metres (490 ft) covered but outdoor walk from the station concourse.

=== Track and rolling stock ===
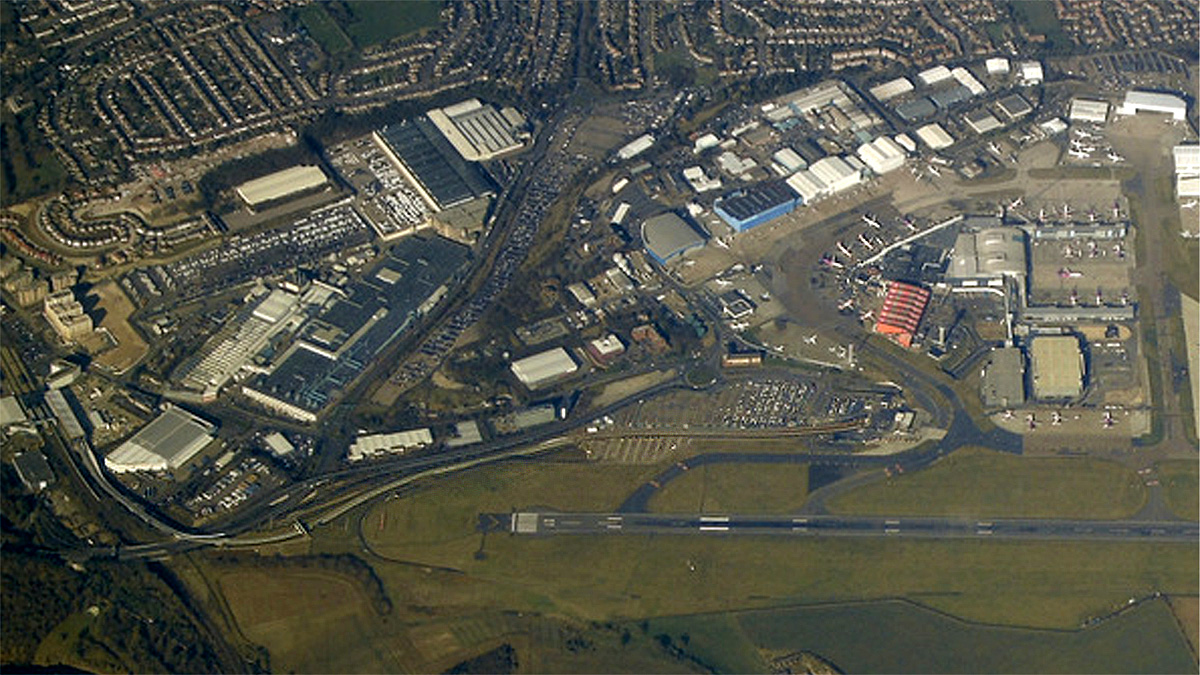
Aerial view of Luton Airport in February 2022; the Luton DART line crosses the picture from the mainline railway station in the bottom-left, terminating at the airport in the centre of the photo.

Luton DART is operated using Cable Liner automated people mover technology manufactured by Doppelmayr Cable Car. The line uses the Cable Liner's Double Shuttle configuration, with two unconnected tracks, each with its own independent cable haulage system. There are two four-section articulated trains, with one on each track. Each train has a capacity of 170 passengers, and operates at a maximum running speed of 50.4 km/h (31.3 mph). A four-minute interval service requires the use of both trains, whilst an eight-minute interval can be maintained with a single train in service.

=== Fares and ticketing ===
The single fare for the DART is £4.90, and through tickets to Luton Airport are available, from all stations on the National Rail. Luton residents can register for half-price travel, and holders of concessionary travel passes, disabled blue badge holders and airport workers can register for free travel. Registration for both half-price and free travel must be done online, at least 72 hours before travel, and tickets obtained online once registration is authorised; passes are not accepted at the barriers.

The £4.90 DART fare has been criticised as too expensive for the short journey; at £3.95 per mile, it is claimed by The Guardian to be the most expensive train in Britain by distance.

East Midlands Railway states that through tickets to destinations across the UK will be available. A "walk up" fare from the airport to London St Pancras will cost £22.40 one way, which it says is similar in price to other airport rail links in the UK (such as Heathrow Express), though at least 25 per cent of Advance tickets will be sold at £10 one way or less.

=== Interchange ===
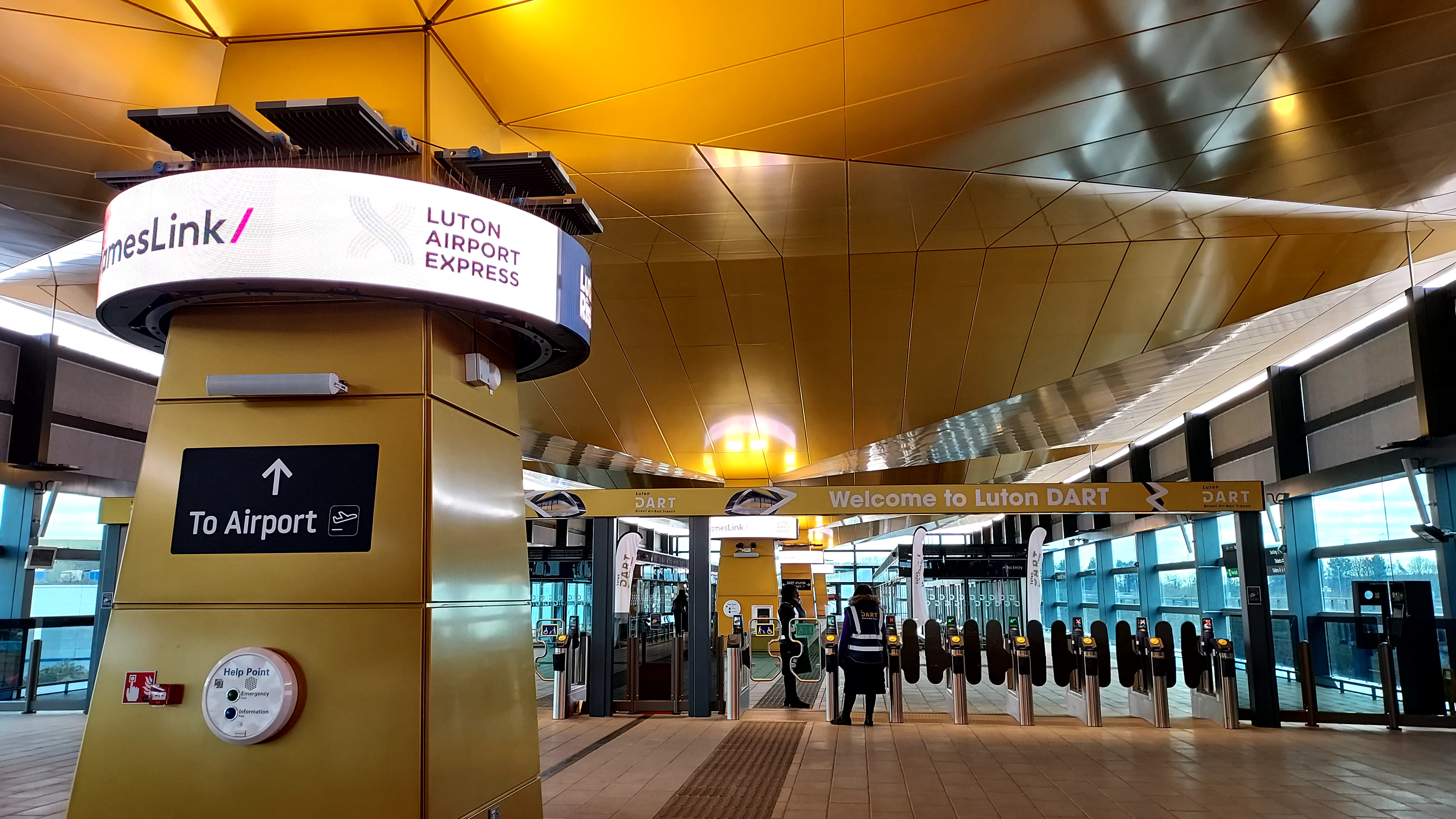
Luton Airport Parkway station concourse

East Midlands Railway services between London St Pancras and Corby, previously branded as "EMR Connect", were rebranded to "Luton Airport Express" following the opening of the DART. They run every 30 minutes and operate non-stop between Luton Airport Parkway and London St Pancras with a journey time of 24 minutes. To the north of the airport, they also serve Luton, Bedford, Wellingborough and Kettering.

Thameslink also provides service to Luton Airport Parkway, with six trains an hour calling at the station in both directions during the day. To the north trains run to Luton and Bedford, and to the south they serve London St Pancras and continue to various destinations to the south of London, including Brighton, Gatwick Airport and Rainham. The journey time to St Pancras varies between 40 and 50 minutes depending on the stopping pattern.

=== Ridership ===
In March 2024, following one year of operation, it was reported that 2.7 million passengers had used the service. This figure increased to 6 million passengers total by March 2025 with 80% of passengers travelling to or from London.

== Future developments ==
As part of the proposals for the expansion of Luton Airport, it is envisaged that the DART line would be extended eastwards to terminate at a new station serving Terminal 2.
