= Hard Rock-Treasure Island Tram =

People mover in Paradise, Nevada

Coordinates: 36.12277°N 115.17297°W

Hard Rock-Treasure Island Hotel & Casino Tram
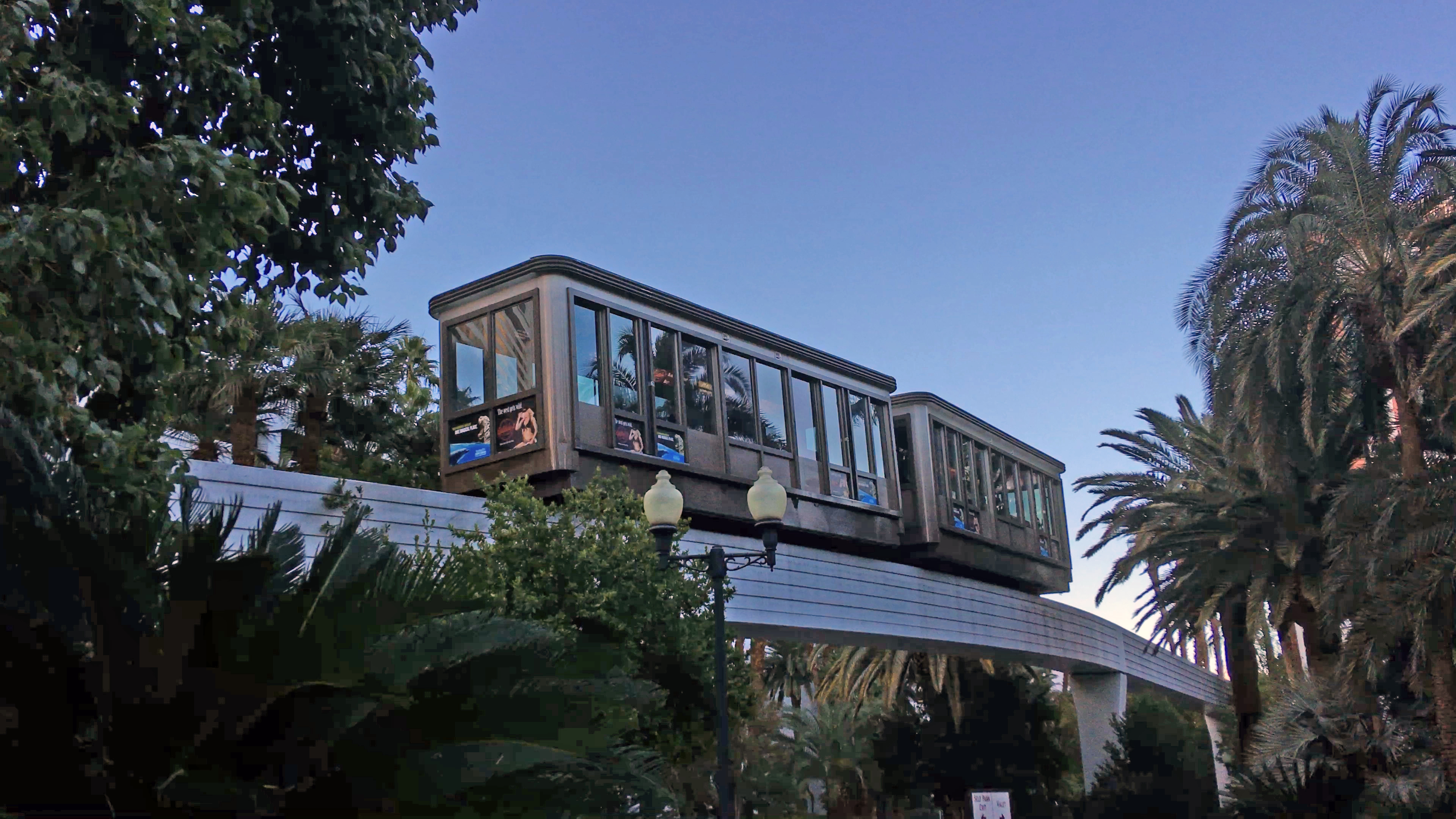

Overview
- Locale: Las Vegas Strip, Paradise, NV, US
- Transit type: Automated guideway transit/People mover
- Number of lines: 1
- Number of stations: 2

Operation
- Began operation: 1993
- Ended operation: 2024 (temporarily)
- Character: Fully elevated
- Number of vehicles: 1
- Train length: 2

Technical
- System length: 305 m (1,000.7 ft)
- Track gauge: guideway
- Average speed: 8m/s

The Hard Rock-Treasure Island Tram is a temporarily closed 1,000-foot-long (300 m) people mover connecting the adjacent Las Vegas Strip casinos Treasure Island and the upcoming Hard Rock Las Vegas. The tram previously connected to The Mirage before its closure. The tram takes about 90 seconds to go from one end to the other, and is free to ride.

The tram opened in 1993 along with the opening of the Treasure Island casino. At the time both Treasure Island and The Mirage were owned by Mirage Resorts. The tram temporarily ceased operation in mid-2024, just prior to The Mirage closing for an extensive remodeling and transformation into the Hard Rock Las Vegas. The tram will resume service once Hard Rock Las Vegas opens.

== Route ==
The original plan of connecting the Mirage-Treasure Island Tram with the Aria Express to connect the four hotels that were owned at the time by the same company was foiled when Caesars Palace would not permit the tram to cross its property. The tram will run from the front of the Hard Rock to the rear of Treasure Island when it reopens.

== Technical ==
The tram consists of a single elevated track, with a single 2-car train running back and forth between the two stations. It uses rubber tires and was cable hauled. It operated as a fully automated guideway system. The train has a total capacity of 120 passengers. One-way capacity is 1,800 passengers/hour.

The tram was built by VSL and Lift Engineering of Carson City. In 2020 it was extensively overhauled by Jakes associates.

== Gallery ==
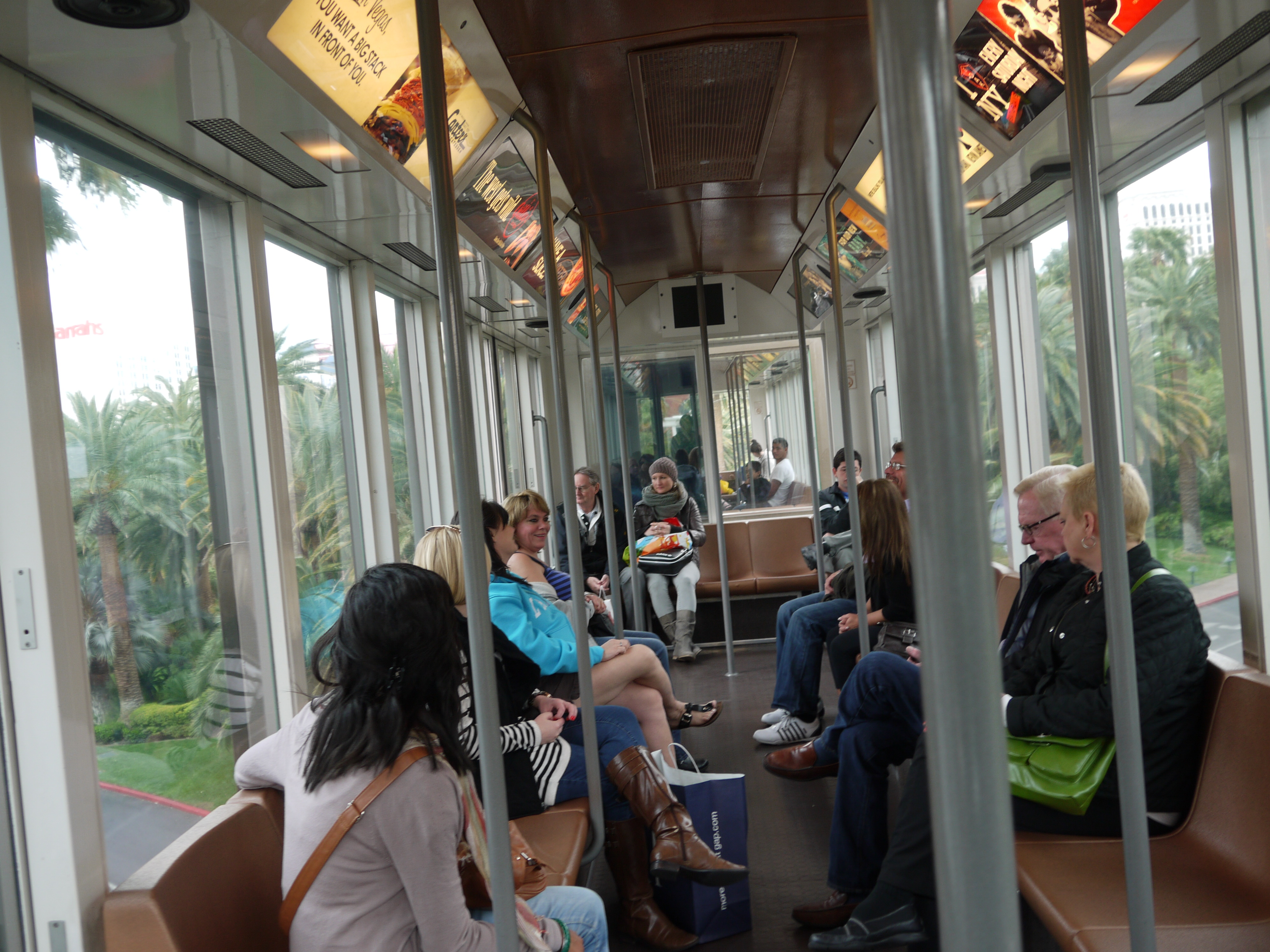
On board the tram with a full passenger load

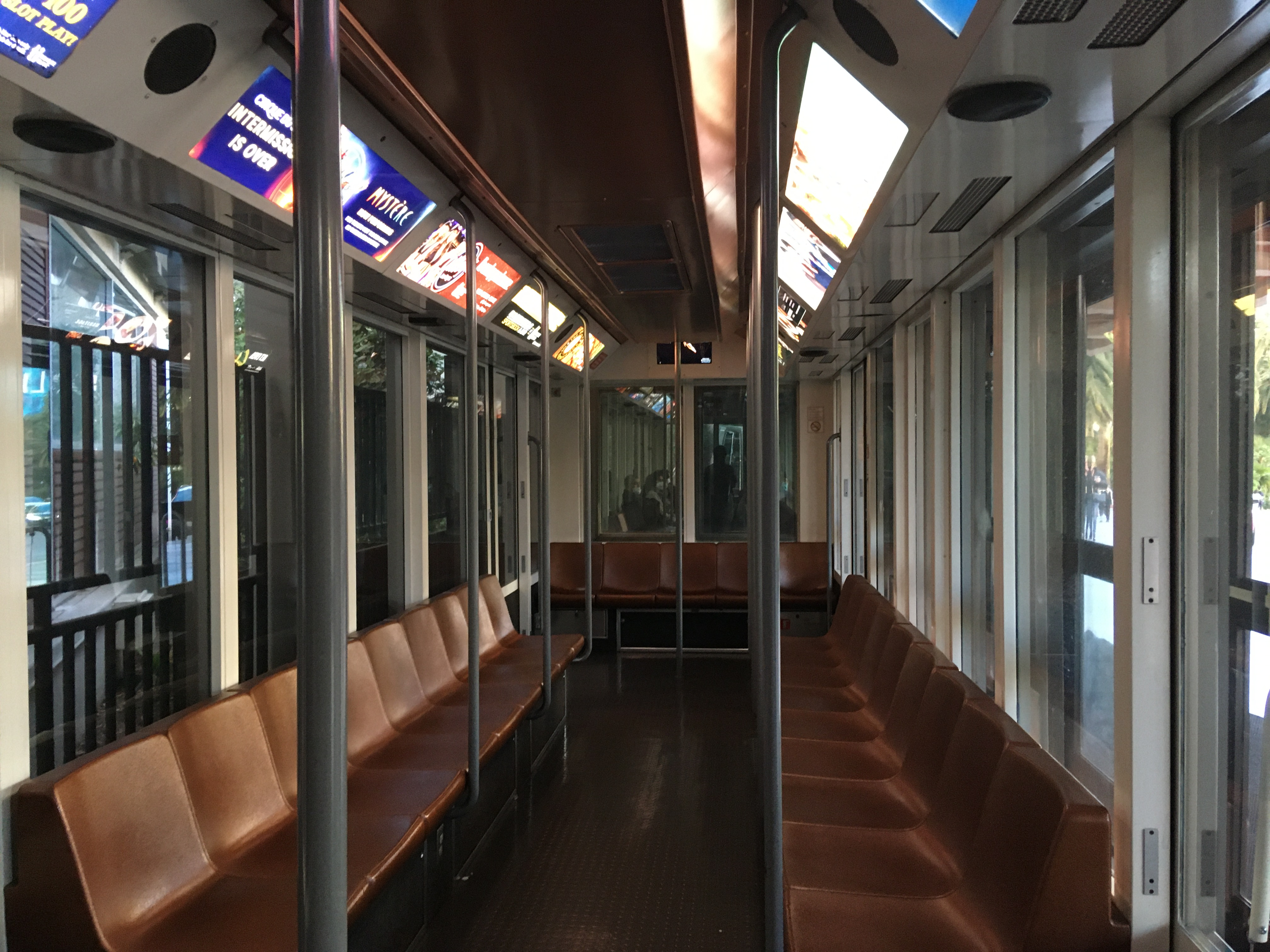
On board the tram with an empty railcar

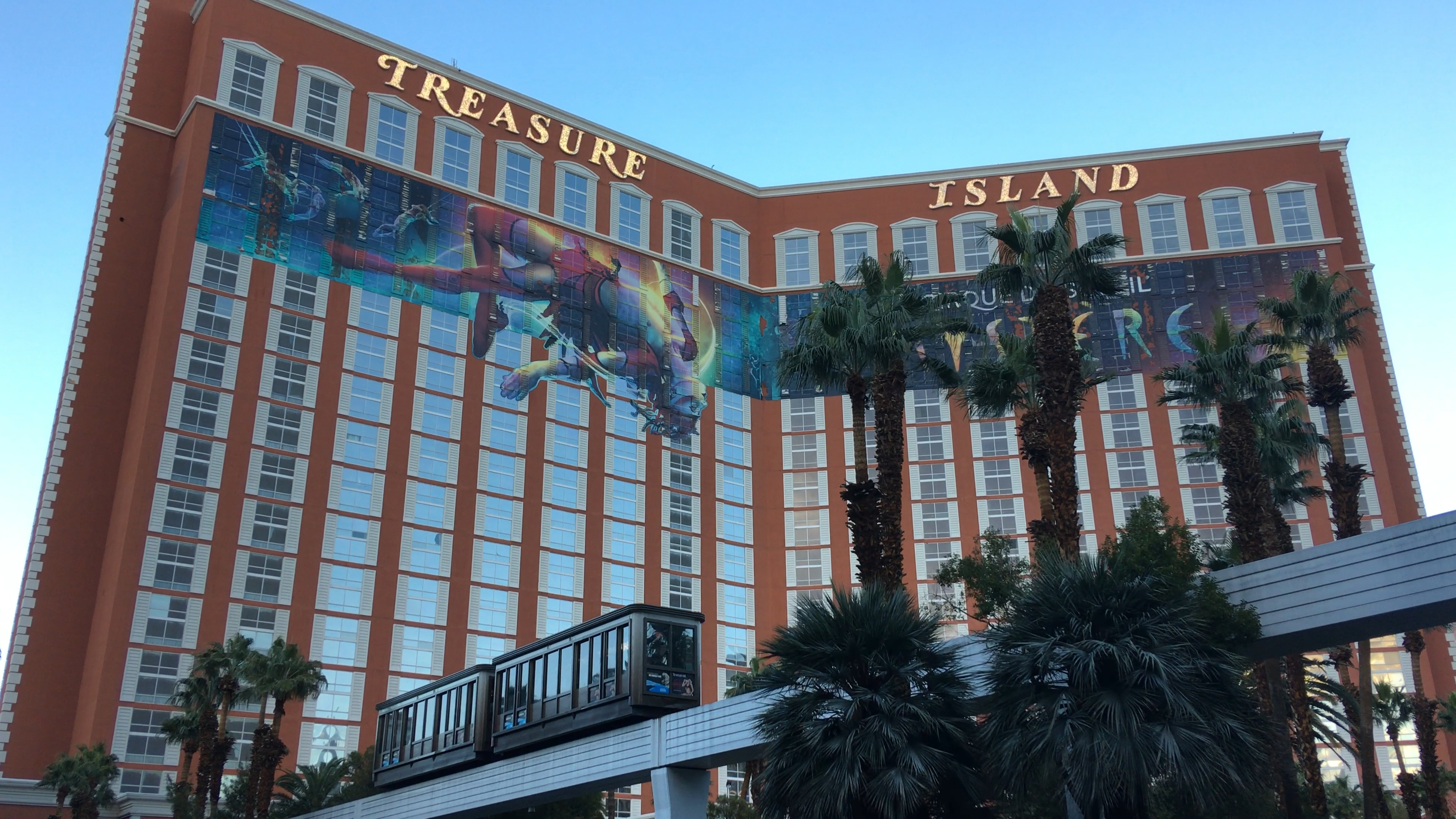
The tram passing in front of Treasure Island

== See also ==
=== Transit ===
- The Deuce (transit bus service)
- Las Vegas Monorail

=== Resort trams ===
- Aria Express
- Mandalay Bay Tram
- Circus Sky Shuttle
