= Air-Rail Link =

People mover at Birmingham Airport

Coordinates: 52.4522°N 1.7294°W

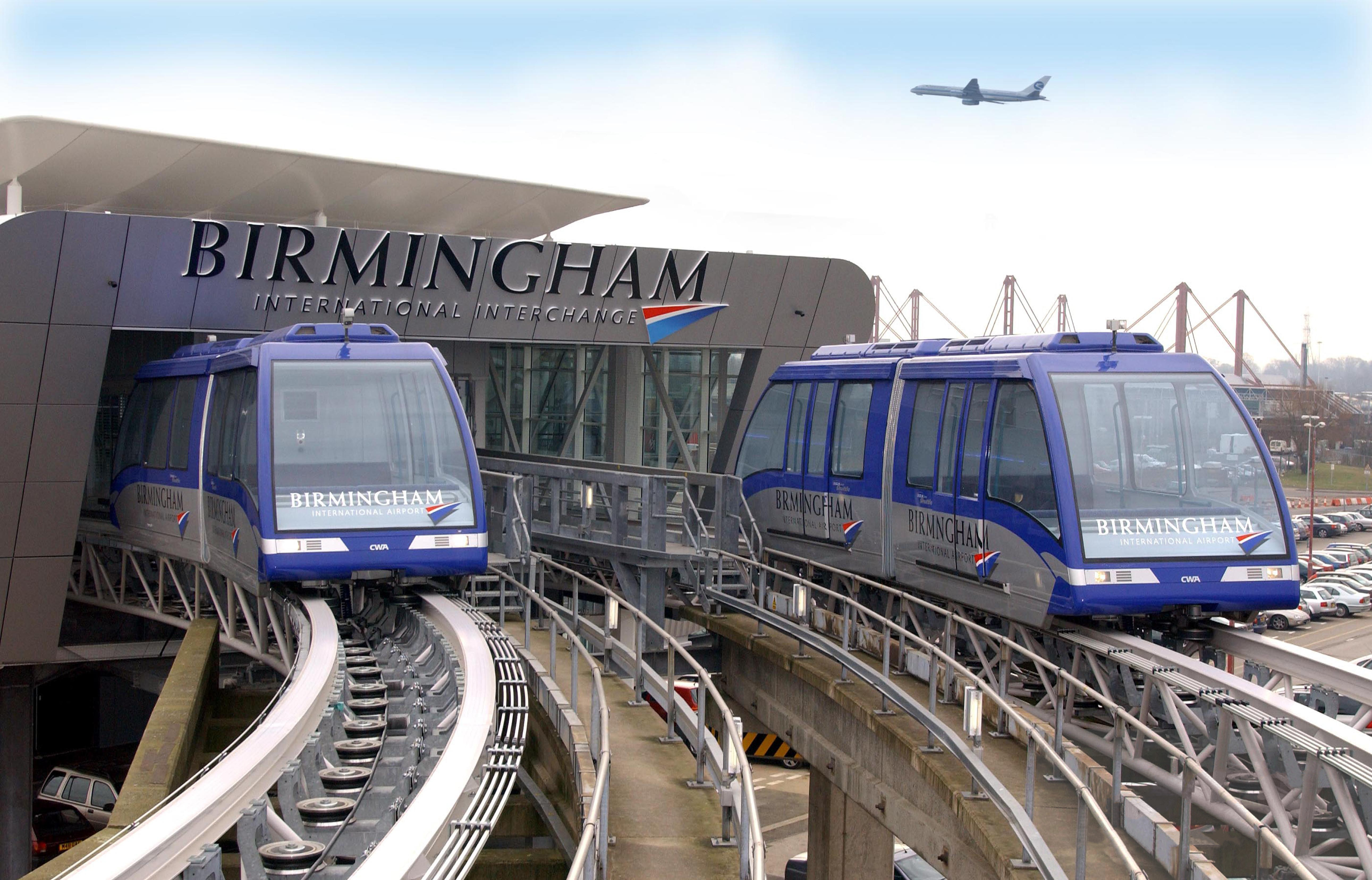
- The Air-Rail Link connects Birmingham Airport and airport railway station with a pair of cable-driven people movers.

Overview
- Status: In operation
- Owner: Birmingham International Airport Limited
- Locale: Birmingham, England
- Termini: Birmingham International railway station; Birmingham Airport (check-in area)
- Connecting lines: Wolverhampton–Shrewsbury line, Cambrian Line, Rugby–Birmingham–Stafford line, West Coast Main Line, CrossCountry network
- Stations: 2
- Website: https://www.birminghamairport.co.uk/

Service
- Type: People mover
- Ridership: 3 million passengers per year

History
- Opened: 7 March 2003

Technical
- Line length: 0.585 km (0.364 mi)
- Number of tracks: 2
- Character: Elevated, cable-hauled system
- Operating speed: 36 km/h (22 mph)
Route map
- This system has step-free access.

The Air-Rail Link is a people mover linking Birmingham Airport with Birmingham International railway station and the National Exhibition Centre in England. The current system, originally known as SkyRail, replaced the earlier Birmingham Maglev system in 2003.

The current system is a fully automated cable-hauled system. It takes passengers between the high-level railway station concourse and the airport terminal buildings, covering a distance of 585 metres (1,919 ft). It is free to use, and handles three million passengers per year. At off-peak times, the system operates on demand using call buttons. The Air-Rail Link was constructed between 2001 and 2003 using the Cable Liner technology from Doppelmayr Cable Car; it was the firm's first airport system.

The Birmingham Maglev, opened in 1984, was the first commercial Maglev transport system in the world. Constructed during the early 1980s by a consortium under contract from West Midlands County Council, the system was fully automated and used an elevated concrete guideway (the majority of which has been reused for the current Air-Rail Link system). Propulsion and braking were performed using linear induction motors while sensors regulated the vertical and lateral air gaps to assure ride quality and minimise power consumption. The system had a journey time of 90 seconds and could move up to 3,200 passengers per hour in either direction. It was discontinued in 1995 due to a lack of spare parts and obsolescence issues; the cost of its reinstatement as a maglev was deemed to be too great.

== Maglev ==
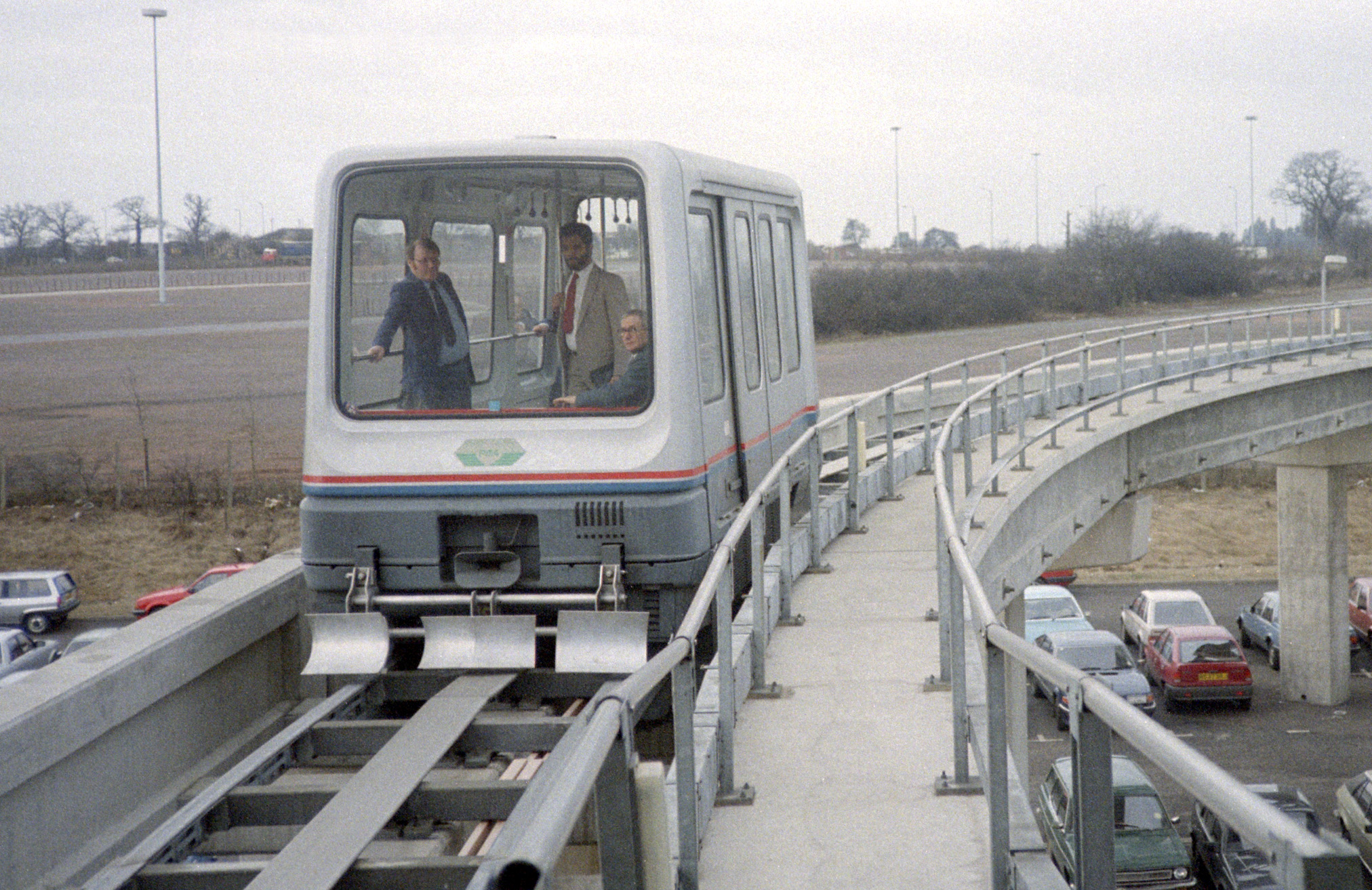
The original Birmingham International maglev shuttle

Initial feasibility studies for a link from the airport to the railway station and exhibition centre were started in 1979 by the owners of the airport at that time, West Midlands County Council. Decision makers were opposed to the construction of a conventional railway to meet this need. The selected solution was based on experimental work commissioned by the British government at the British Rail Research Division laboratory at Derby. During 1981, contracts were awarded to a consortium of GEC, Balfour Beatty, Brush Electrical Machines and Metro-Cammell under the name "People Mover Group", along with John Laing.

Metro-Cammell performed the bulk of the manufacturing of the carriages at its Washwood Heath plant. During the construction phase of the system, several difficulties were encountered. One was that, due to there being no contact between the concrete guideways and the trainers, conventional speedometers would not function. One major setback came out of the decision made by one company to reinforce the bottom of the carriages of an early train with an additional layer of fiberglass; while increasing structural strength, this choice had also increased the overall weight of the train, which was already relatively heavy, and meant that the electromagnets were unable to reliably keep the train afloat. Due to this unsatisfactory performance, a new train had to be produced to replace it.

On 16 August 1984, the system was officially opened; this launch date came four months later than the original project schedule had intended. The system had a theoretical maximum capacity of 3,200 passengers per hour in either direction, which were carried in a pair of twin-carriage trains that could accommodate up to 80 passengers at a time. Each train operated on independent tracks and took around 90 seconds to perform a one-way trip, during which it would attain a maximum speed of 40 miles per hour (64 km/h). The trains were both propelled and braked using linear induction motors that were located, along with the electromagnets, underneath the carriages. A key element of the system were the sensors that regulated the vertical and lateral air gaps, the function of which was both to assure ride quality and minimise power consumption. Control of both the motors and magnetic levitation was achieved via automatic train operation. The track was 600 metres (1,969 ft) in length, and trains "flew" at an altitude of 15 millimetres (0.59 in).

Over an eleven year period, the system operated successfully and without major incident, however, obsolescence issues related to the electronic systems, as well as a lack of spare parts, led to it being increasingly unreliable during its later years. Even by the early 1990s, it remained unique, with no other sites having opted to deploy the system. On 18 June 1995, the system operated for the final time; by this point, an investigation had concluded that the cost of reinstating and maintaining the Maglev would be too high. Initially, the carriages for the Maglev were stored by the airport owners, Birmingham International Airport Ltd., on the airport site.

A model of the Birmingham Maglev, together with one of the Maglev carriages (number 3), can be found in Locomotion in Shildon. A second carriage (number 1) resides at Railworld. The third carriage (number 2) was put up for sale in an auction on eBay in late 2010 after lying unused at the airport since the system's closure. It was initially sold for £25,100, with the proceeds to go to two charities, but the bidder defaulted and it was resold to a private buyer near Kenilworth for just £100.

After the system's closure, the original guideway lay dormant while a shuttle bus service was operated in its place. However, the shuttle was only a temporary measure until development of a suitable replacement, studies for which commenced during the 1990s. During 2003, the guideway was reactivated, albeit in a modified form, for the replacement cable hauled Air-Rail people mover.

== Cable Liner ==
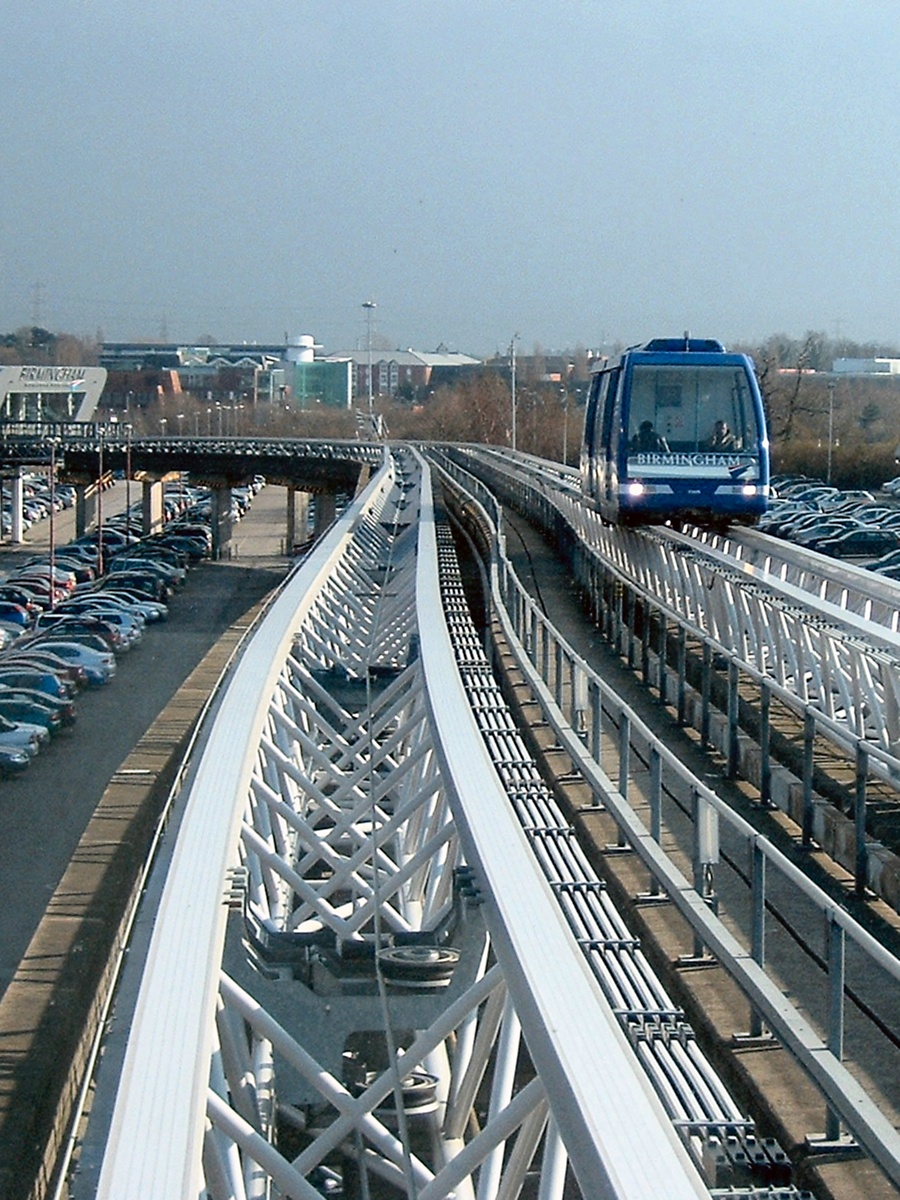
The new system was installed on top of the existing 1980s concrete Maglev guideway structure.

The current Air-Rail Link is a cable-propelled shuttle system, using the Cable Liner technology from Doppelmayr Cable Car. The 585 m-long (1,921 ft) line takes travellers from the public transport interchange to the airport check-in in 90 seconds. It is a dual track shuttle with two stations and two trains, each of two cars, operating independently at a speed of 36 kilometres per hour (22 mph). The trains operate at a minimum headway of 120 seconds, consisting of a dwell time at each station of 30 seconds and a journey time of 90 seconds. The individual cars carry twenty-seven passengers at 0.33 square metres (3.6 sq ft) per person, thus giving a capacity of 54 passengers per train. During the day, the trains run every few minutes each way. At off-peak times, trains operate on demand, and to facilitate this, a button labelled "DEMAND" must be pressed by the prospective passenger. The line is free to use, and handles three million passengers per year.

The Air-Rail Link was built on top of the previous Maglev guideway, which was slightly shortened by an extension of the railway station concourse to accommodate a low-level bus station. Several modifications were necessary to the guideway; chiefly, the support columns needed strengthening to withstand the higher loads imposed by the cables. To this end, carbon fibre plates were bonded to the external face of the concrete columns at positions where the track runs on radius. Furthermore, the track structure was adopted to accommodate the installation of steel guide ways for the cables and running rails.

On 30 March 2001, the replacement project was formally launched. The scheme came under a design, build and operate contract valued at £10 million and involved multiple companies; design work was performed by Babtie, Shaw and Morton while Siemens was responsible for the mechanical and electrical systems and civil engineering work was performed by Fitzpatrick. Construction took less than two years; the first day of public operation occurred on 7 March 2003. The Birmingham Airport Link was Doppelmayr Cable Car's first airport system and replaced the temporary bus service that had been operating since 1995. The new system has motivated passengers travelling to the airport to leave their cars at home and use public transport.

== See also ==
- Terminal Link, a 7-car long airport system using the same technology in Toronto, Canada
- Airport Shuttle Mexico, airport system using the same technology in Mexico
- Free public transport
