= Cabletren Bolivariano =

Automated people mover in Caracas, Venezuela

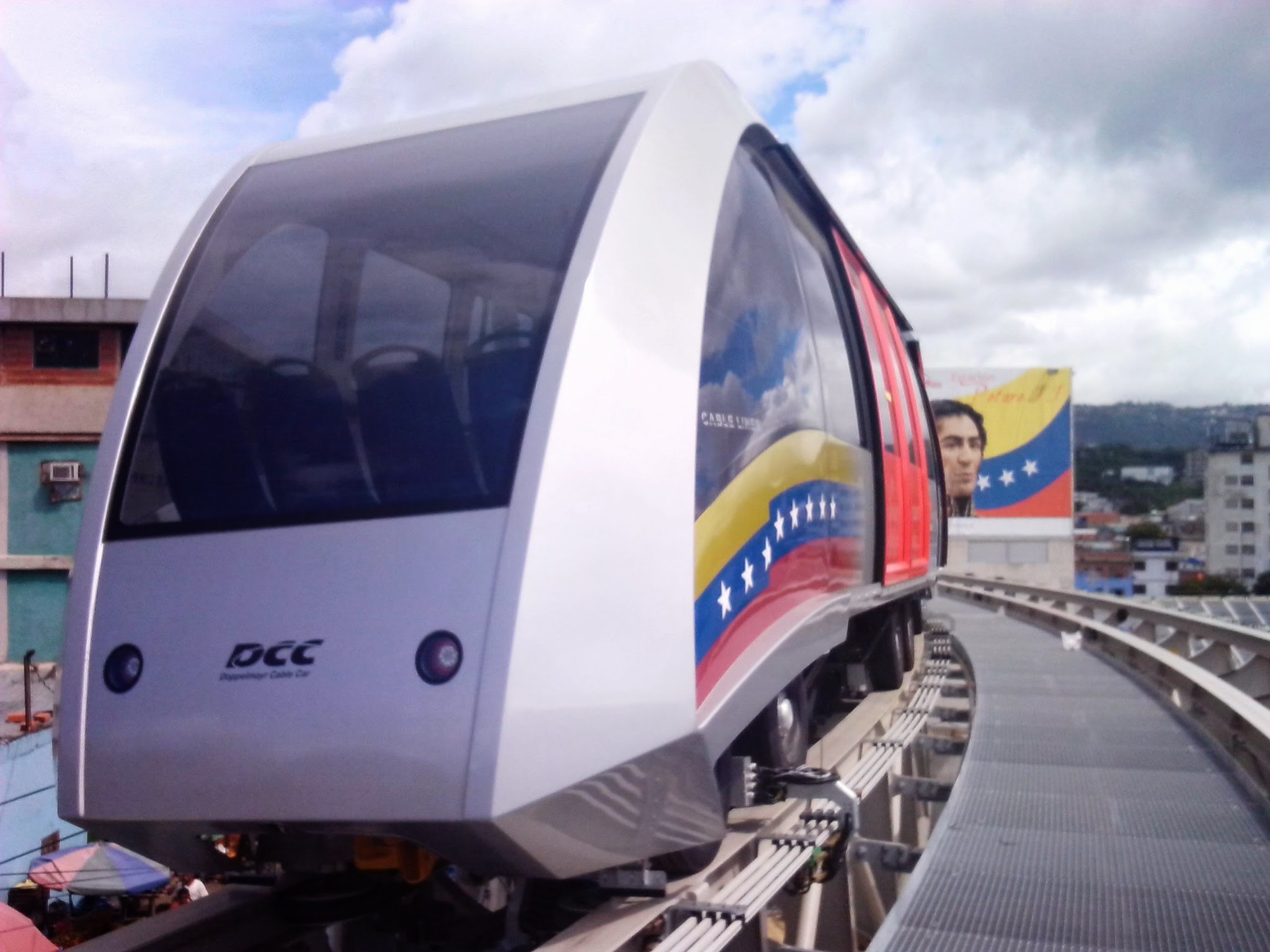
- A Cabletren Bolivariano train near Petare II station

Overview
- Locale: Caracas
- Transit type: automated people mover
- Number of lines: 1
- Number of stations: 3 (2 more planned)

Operation
- Began operation: August 14, 2013
- Operator(s): Compañía Anónima Metro de Caracas

Technical
- System length: 2.1 km (1.3 mi)

The Cabletren Bolivariano, is an automated people mover system that is part of the commercial operation of the Caracas Metro. It was built by the Brazilian company Constructora Norberto Odebrecht and the Austrian company Doppelmayr Cable Car. Public operation commenced in August 2013. It can handle approximately 3,000 passengers per hour per direction.
