= Major film studios =

Large U.S. film companies

The logos of the "Big Four" film studios

The major film studios are entertainment companies that produce, finance and distribute a substantial number of feature films annually and consistently command a significant share of global box office revenue. In the American film industry, the major film studios, or majors, are currently four diversified media conglomerates whose various film production and distribution subsidiaries collectively command a substantial majority of American box office revenue. The major film studios are sometimes collectively known as the Big Four studios. The term may also be applied more specifically to the primary motion picture business subsidiary of each respective conglomerate.

Since the early twentieth century, major American film studios have dominated American cinema and played a leading role in the global film industry. American studios have benefited from a strong first-mover advantage in that they were the first to industrialize filmmaking and master the art of mass-producing and distributing films with broad cross-cultural appeal. Following significant consolidation, the major film studios are now organized into four corporate groups: Universal Filmed Entertainment Group, Skydance Motion Picture Group, Walt Disney Studios and Sony Pictures Motion Picture Group. Each group operates or controls multiple film production companies and maintains an extensive international distribution network that releases films in theatrical markets worldwide. The major film studios enjoy "significant internal economies of scale" from their "extensive and efficient [distribution] infrastructure," while it is "nearly impossible" for a film to reach a broad international theatrical audience without being first picked up by one of the majors for distribution.

== Overview ==
Summary of the 2025 North American market share of each studio.
1. Walt Disney Studios (28%)
2. Warner Bros. Entertainment (now part of Skydance Motion Picture Group) (21%)
3. Universal Studios (20%)
4. Sony Pictures (7%)
5. Paramount Pictures (now part of Skydance Motion Picture Group) (6%)
6. Lionsgate Studios (4%)
7. A24 (3%)
8. Other (Note: Includes Amazon MGM Studios, Angel Studios, Fathom Entertainment, GKIDS and Neon Rated, LLC) (6%)

The current Big Four major film studios (Universal, Skydance, Disney, and Sony) all trace their origins to studios active during Hollywood's Golden Age. One of these were among that original era's Eight Majors, being that era's original Big Five plus its Little Three, collectively the eight film studios that controlled as much as 96% of the market during the 1930s and 1940s.

The original Big Five were Paramount Pictures, Warner Bros. Pictures, Metro-Goldwyn-Mayer, 20th Century Fox, and RKO Pictures.

Universal Pictures was, during that early era, considered one of the Little Three, along with United Artists and Columbia Pictures. RKO went defunct in 1958, but was brought back by RKO General in 1978. United Artists began as a distribution company for several independent producers, later began producing its own films, and was eventually acquired by MGM in 1981. Columbia Pictures eventually merged in 1987 with Tri-Star Pictures to form Columbia Pictures Entertainment, now known as Sony Pictures Entertainment Inc.

During the Golden Age, Walt Disney Productions was an independent production company and not considered a "major studio" until 1984, when it joined 20th Century Fox, Columbia, Metro–Goldwyn–Mayer, Paramount, Universal, and Warner Bros. to comprise the Big Seven. The decay led MGM to become a mini-major upon its sale in 1986, reducing the majors to the Big Six. In 1989, Sony acquired Columbia Pictures Entertainment, which became Sony Pictures Entertainment in 1991.

In 2019, Disney acquired Fox, reducing the majors to a Big Five for the first time since Hollywood's Golden Age.

In 2025, Paramount merged with Skydance Media to form Paramount Skydance. In 2026, Paramount Skydance acquired Warner Bros. Discovery to become Skydance Corporation, reducing the majors to the current Big Four.

Meanwhile, Sony Pictures Motion Picture Group is a wholly owned subsidiary of Sony Pictures Entertainment, which is owned by Tokyo-based Sony Group Corporation and is the only US film studio owned by a foreign conglomerate. Universal, now owned by Philadelphia-based Comcast (via NBCUniversal), was previously owned by foreign companies including Japan's Matsushita Electric, Canada's Seagram, and France's Vivendi in succession. Warner Bros. Pictures and Paramount Pictures are both owned by Skydance Corporation, which is headquartered in New York City. Most of today's Big Four also control subsidiaries with their own distribution networks that concentrate on arthouse pictures (e.g., Universal's Focus Features) or genre films (e.g., Sony's Screen Gems).

Outside of the Big Four, there are several smaller American production and distribution companies, known as independents or "indies". The leading independent producers and distributors such as Lionsgate Studios, the aforementioned Metro-Goldwyn-Mayer (now owned by Amazon), and A24, are sometimes referred to as "mini-majors". From 1998 through 2005, during a portion of the Big Six period, DreamWorks SKG commanded a large enough market share to arguably qualify it as a seventh major. In 2006, DreamWorks was acquired by Viacom, Paramount's then-corporate parent. Viacom, after other mergers and acquisitions and rebrandings, included its movie studio's well-known name when the parent company merged with National Amusements and Skydance Media to form Paramount Skydance Corporation in 2025. In late 2008, a new DreamWorks was created as an independent production company; its films were distributed by Disney's Touchstone Pictures until 2016, at which point distribution switched to Universal. DreamWorks is now part of Amblin Partners, and is separate from DreamWorks Animation, which is owned by Universal.

Today, the Big Four major studios are primarily financial backers and distributors of films whose actual production is largely handled by independent companies – either long-running entities or ones created for and dedicated to the making of a specific film. For example, Disney and Sony Pictures distribute their films through affiliated divisions (Walt Disney Studios Motion Pictures and Sony Pictures Releasing, respectively), while the others function as both production and distribution companies. The specialty divisions (such as Disney's Searchlight Pictures and Universal's Focus Features) often acquire distribution rights to films in which the studio has had no prior involvement. While the majors still do a modicum of true production, their activities are focused more in the areas of development, financing, marketing, and merchandising. Those business functions are still usually performed in or near Los Angeles, even though the runaway production phenomenon means that most films are now mostly or completely shot on location at places outside Los Angeles.

The Big Four major studios are also members of the Motion Picture Association (MPA) and the Alliance of Motion Picture and Television Producers (AMPTP).

== History ==
=== Before the Golden Age ===
In 1909, Thomas Edison, who had been fighting in the courts for years for control of fundamental motion picture patents, won a major decision. This led to the creation of the Motion Picture Patents Company, widely known as the Trust. Comprising the eight largest U.S. film companies, it was "designed to eliminate not only independent film producers but also the country's 10,000 independent [distribution] exchanges and exhibitors." Though its many members did not consolidate their filmmaking operations, the New York–based Trust was arguably the first major North American movie conglomerate. The independents' fight against the Trust was led by Carl Laemmle, whose Chicago-based Laemmle Film Service, serving the Midwest and Canada, was the largest distribution exchange in North America. Laemmle's efforts were rewarded in 1912 when the U.S. government ruled that the Trust was a "corrupt and unlawful association" and must be dissolved. On June 8, 1912, Laemmle organized the merger of his production division, IMP (Independent Motion Picture Company), with several other filmmaking companies, creating the Universal Film Manufacturing Company in New York City. By the end of the year, Universal was making movies at two Los Angeles facilities: the former Nestor Film studio in Hollywood, and another studio in Edendale. The first Hollywood major studio was in business.

In 1916, a second powerful Hollywood studio was established when Adolph Zukor merged his Famous Players Film Company movie production house with the Jesse L. Lasky Company to form Famous Players–Lasky. The combined studio acquired Paramount Pictures as a distribution arm and eventually adopted its name. That same year, William Fox relocated his Fox Film Corporation from Fort Lee, New Jersey to Hollywood and began expanding.

In 1918, four brothers—Harry, Albert, Sam, and Jack Warner—founded the first Warner Bros. Studio on Sunset Boulevard in Hollywood. On April 4, 1923, the Warner Bros. incorporated their fledgling movie company as "Warner Bros. Pictures, Inc.". Though their first film was My Four Years in Germany, Warner Bros. released their full-fledged movie The Jazz Singer in 1927. Warner Bros. were the pioneers of the sound film era as they established Vitaphone. Because of The Jazz Singer's success (along with Lights of New York, The Singing Fool and The Terror), Warner Bros. was eventually able to acquire a much larger studio in Burbank, which it began to use starting in 1928 (and which is famous for its signature water tower). Warner Bros. eventually expanded its studio operations to Leavesden in London. Warner Bros. Studios Leavesden is the main studio in production of hit movies like the Harry Potter film series, The Dark Knight and the recent ones like The Batman and Ready Player One.

In 1923, Walt Disney had founded the Disney Brothers Cartoon Studio and The Disney Brothers Features Company with his brother Roy and animator Ub Iwerks. Renamed as Walt Disney Productions, Disney became a powerful independent over the next three decades focusing on animation with its shorts and films being distributed over the years by various majors; primarily Leslie B. Mace, Winkler Pictures, Universal Pictures, Celebrity Productions, Cinephone, Columbia Pictures, United Artists, United Artists Pictures and finally RKO. In its first year in 1928, Celebrity Productions and Cinephone had released its first blockbuster Steamboat Willie. In the decades that followed, Disney and its associated distributors were able to achieve occasional successes, but its relatively small output and exclusive focus on G-rated films meant that it was not generally considered to be one of the majors.

In 1924, Metro-Goldwyn-Mayer was founded by Marcus Loew by combining Metro Pictures, Goldwyn Pictures (including its Culver City studio lot, its Leo the Lion "Ars Gratia Artis" slogan, and its contracted stars and projects), and Louis B. Mayer Pictures into one company.

The Motion Picture Theatre Owners of America and the Independent Producers' Association declared war in 1925 on what they termed a common enemy — the "film trust" of Metro-Goldwyn-Mayer, Paramount, and First National, which they claimed dominated the industry by not only producing and distributing motion pictures, but by entering into exhibition as well.

On October 6, 1927, Warner Bros. released The Jazz Singer, starring Al Jolson, and a whole new era began, with "pictures that talked", bringing the studio to the forefront of the film industry. The Jazz Singer played to standing-room-only crowds throughout the country and earned a special Academy Award for Technical Achievement. Fox, in the forefront of sound film technology along with Warner Bros., was also acquiring a sizable circuit of movie theaters to exhibit its product. The development of sound films like The Jazz Singer near the end of the Roaring Twenties resulted in a massive rush of Americans to movie theaters to watch the new "talkies". At the peak of the fad, every person in the United States over the age of six was watching a motion picture in a theater at least once a week. The box office revenue from the first sound films is what enabled the Hollywood majors to achieve their lasting domination of the global film industry.

=== During the Golden Age ===
Between late 1928, when RCA's David Sarnoff engineered the creation of the RKO (Radio-Keith-Orpheum) studio, and the end of 1949, when Paramount divested its theater chain—roughly the period considered Hollywood's Golden Age—there were eight Hollywood studios commonly regarded as the "majors". Of these eight, the so-called Big Five were integrated conglomerates, combining ownership of a production studio, distribution division, and substantial theater chain, and contracting with performers and filmmaking personnel: Loews/MGM, Paramount, Fox (which became 20th Century-Fox after a 1935 merger), Warner Bros., and RKO. The remaining majors were sometimes referred to as the "Little Three" or "major minor" studios. Two—Universal and Columbia (founded in 1924)—were organized similarly to the Big Five, except for the fact that they never owned more than small theater circuits (a consistently reliable source of profits). The third of the lesser majors, United Artists (founded in 1919), owned a few theaters and had access to production facilities owned by its principals, but it functioned primarily as a backer-distributor, loaning money to independent producers and releasing their films. During the 1930s, the eight majors averaged a total of 358 feature film releases a year; in the 1940s, the four largest companies shifted more of their resources toward high-budget productions and away from B movies, bringing the yearly average down to 288 for the decade.

Among the significant characteristics of the Golden Age was the stability of the Hollywood majors, their hierarchy, and their near-complete domination of the box office. At the midpoint of the Golden Age, 1939, the Big Five had market shares ranging from 22% (MGM) to 9% (RKO); each of the Little Three had around a 7% share. In sum, the eight majors controlled 95% of the market. Ten years later, the picture was largely the same: the Big Five had market shares ranging from 22% (MGM) to 9% (RKO); the Little Three had shares ranging from 8% (Columbia) to 4% (United Artists). In sum, the eight majors controlled 96% of the market.

=== After the Golden Age ===
==== 1950–1969 ====
The end of the Golden Age had been signaled by the majors' loss of a federal antitrust case that led to the divestiture of the Big Five's theater chains. Though this had virtually no immediate effect on the eight majors' box-office domination, it somewhat leveled the playing field between the Big Five and the Little Three. In November 1951, Decca Records purchased 28% of Universal; early the following year, the studio became the first of the classic Hollywood majors to be taken over by an outside corporation, as Decca acquired majority ownership. In 1953, Disney established its own distribution division, Buena Vista Film Distribution, to handle its own product which had been largely distributed by RKO. The 1950s also saw two substantial shifts in the hierarchy of the majors: RKO, perennially the weakest of the Big Five, declined rapidly under the mismanagement of Howard Hughes, who had purchased a controlling interest in the studio in 1948. By the time Hughes sold it to the General Tire and Rubber Company in 1955, the studio was a major by outdated reputation alone. In 1957, virtually all RKO movie operations ceased and the studio was dissolved in 1958. (Revived on a small scale in 1981, it was eventually spun off and now operates as a minor independent company.) In contrast, there was United Artists, which had long operated under the financing-distribution model the other majors were now progressively shifting toward. Under Arthur Krim and Robert Benjamin, who began managing the company in 1951, UA became consistently profitable. By 1956—when it released one of the biggest blockbusters of the decade, Around the World in 80 Days—it commanded a 10% market share. By the middle of the next decade, it had reached 16% and was the second-most profitable studio in Hollywood.

Despite RKO's collapse, the remaining seven majors still averaged a total yearly release slate of 253 feature films during the decade. Following MCA Inc.'s acquisition of Decca Records and the aforementioned Universal under Lew Wasserman in 1962, the later half of the 1960s were marked by four others — Paramount, United Artists, Warner Bros., and MGM — involved in a spate of corporate takeovers that left Columbia, Fox, and Disney as the only major studios under original ownership. Gulf+Western took over Paramount in 1966; and the Transamerica Corporation purchased United Artists in 1967. Warner Bros. underwent large-scale reorganization twice in two years: a 1967 merger with the Seven Arts company preceded a 1969 purchase by Kinney National, under Stephen J. Ross. MGM, in the process of a slow decline, changed ownership twice in the same span as well, winding up in the hands of financier Kirk Kerkorian also in 1969. The majors almost entirely abandoned low-budget production during this era, bringing the annual average of features released down to 160. The decade also saw Disney/Buena Vista commanding a prominent position in the market. Buoyed by the success of Mary Poppins, Disney achieved a 9% market share in 1964, more than Warner and 20th Century-Fox. Though over the next two decades Disney/Buena Vista's share of the box-office would continue to reach this level, the studio was still not considered a major as it did not release many films, and those it did release were exclusively G-rated.

==== 1970–1989 ====
The early 1970s were difficult years for all the classic majors. Movie attendance, which had been declining steadily since the end of the Golden Age, hit an all-time low by 1971. In 1973, MGM president James T. Aubrey drastically downsized the studio, slashing its production schedule and eliminating its distribution arm (UA would distribute the studio's films for the remainder of the decade). From fifteen releases in 1973, the next year MGM was down to five; its average for the rest of the 1970s would be even lower. Like RKO in its last days under Hughes, MGM remained a major in terms of brand reputation, but little more. Disney by contrast began to ascend towards major status through a resurgence in its animated movies, beginning with The Rescuers (1977), and the studio began to enter the adult market with The Black Hole (1979), its first non-G rated film.

By the mid-1970s, the industry had rebounded and a significant philosophical shift was in progress. As the majors focused increasingly on the development of the next hoped-for blockbuster and began routinely opening each new movie in many hundreds of theaters (an approach called "saturation booking"), their collective yearly release average fell to 81 films during 1975–84. The classic set of majors was shaken further in late 1980, when the disastrously expensive flop of Heaven's Gate effectively ruined United Artists. The studio was sold the following year to Kerkorian, who merged it with MGM. After a brief resurgence, the combined studio continued to decline. From 1986, MGM/UA has been at best a "mini-major", to use the present-day term.

The two emerging contenders were both newly formed companies. In 1978, Krim, Benjamin, and three other studio executives departed UA to found Orion Pictures as a joint venture with Warner Bros. It was announced optimistically as the "first major new film company in 50 years". Tri-Star Pictures was created in 1982 as a joint venture of future corporate sibling Columbia Pictures (at that time acquired by the Coca-Cola Company), HBO (then owned by Warner Bros. Discovery's predecessor Time Inc.), and CBS. In 1985, Rupert Murdoch's News Corporation acquired 20th Century-Fox (dropping the hyphen), the last of both the classic Hollywood majors and the Golden Age majors to be taken over by an outside corporation. It remained an independent studio until its 2019 sale to Disney brought back the total majors back to a "Big Five".

Meanwhile, a new member was finally admitted to the club of major studios and two significant contenders emerged. With the combined output of Walt Disney Pictures, the establishment of the Touchstone Pictures brand in 1984, and increasing attention to the adult live-action market during the early 1980s, Disney/Buena Vista secured acknowledgment as a full-fledged major. Film historian Joel Finler identifies 1986 as the breakthrough year, when Disney rose to third place in market share and remained consistently competitive for a leading position thereafter.

By 1986, the combined share of the six classic majors — Paramount, MGM/UA, 20th Century Fox, Warner Bros., Columbia and Universal — fell to 64%, the lowest since the beginning of the Golden Age. Disney was in third place, behind only Paramount and Warner. Even including Disney/Buena Vista as a seventh major and adding its 10% share, the majors' control of the North American market was at a historic ebb. Orion (now completely independent of Warner) and Tri-Star were well positioned as mini-majors, each with North American market shares of around 6% and regarded by industry observers as "fully competitive with the majors", much like MGM and Lionsgate by the turn of the century. Smaller independents garnered 13%—more than any studio aside from Paramount. In 1964, by comparison, all of the companies outside of the then-seven majors and Disney had combined for a grand total of 1%. In the first edition of Finler's The Hollywood Story (1988), he wrote, "It will be interesting to see whether the old-established studios will be able to bounce back in the future, as they have done so many times before, or whether the newest developments really do reflect a fundamental change in the US movie industry for the first times since the 20s."

==== 1990–2009 ====
With the exception of MGM/UA—whose position was effectively supplanted by Disney—the old-established studios did bounce back. The aforementioned purchase of 20th Century Fox by Rupert Murdoch's News Corporation left Disney as the only company under original ownership and presaged a new round of corporate acquisitions not long afterward. As part of that series, Columbia, Paramount and Warner Bros. each received new owners once while Universal changed corporate hands multiple times until the mid-2000s. Paramount's parent company Gulf+Western was renamed Paramount Communications and Coca-Cola sold Columbia to Japanese electronics firm Sony in 1989, creating Sony Pictures. The following year, Warner Communications merged with Time Inc. to birth Time Warner and Universal's parent company MCA was purchased by fellow Japanese electronics conglomerate Matsushita. At this time, both Tri-Star and Orion were essentially out of business: the former merged with Sony and Columbia, the latter bankrupt and sold to MGM. The most important contenders to emerge during the 1990s with Viacom's purchase of Paramount Communications in 1994 — New Line Cinema, Miramax, and DreamWorks SKG — were likewise brought into the majors' fold. Shortly thereafter, Matsushita sold MCA, including Universal Pictures, to Seagram in 1995. Seagram subsequently sold its enertainment assets to Vivendi in 2000. In 2004, Vivendi merged its entertainment operations with General Electric's NBC to form NBCUniversal, with GE holding a controlling stake.

The development of in-house pseudo-indie subsidiaries by the conglomerates—sparked by the 1992 establishment of Sony Pictures Classics and the success of Pulp Fiction (1994) on home video, significantly undermined the position of the true independents. The majors' release schedule rebounded: the six (later five) primary studio subsidiaries alone put out a total of 124 films during 2006; the three largest secondary subsidiaries (New Line, Fox Searchlight, and Focus Features) accounted for another 30. Box-office domination was fully restored: in 2006, the then-six (now five) major movie conglomerates combined for 89.8% of the North American market; Lionsgate and Weinstein were almost exactly half as successful as their 1986 mini-major counterparts, sharing 6.1%; MGM came in at 1.8%; and all of the remaining independent companies split a pool totaling 2.3%.

More developments took place among the majors' subsidiaries. The very successful animation production house Pixar was acquired by Disney in 2006. In 2008, New Line Cinema lost its independent status within Time Warner and became a subsidiary of Warner Bros. Time Warner also announced that it would be shutting down its two specialty units, Warner Independent and Picturehouse. Also in 2008, Paramount Vantage's production, marketing, and distribution departments were folded into the parent studio, though it retained the brand for release purposes. Universal sold off its genre specialty division, Rogue Pictures, to Relativity Media in 2009.

==== 2010–2016 ====
In January 2010, Disney closed down Miramax's operations and sold off the unit and its library that July to an investor group led by Ronald N. Tutor of the Tutor Perini construction firm and Tom Barrack of the Colony Capital private equity firm.

In January 2011, Comcast acquired a 51% controlling stake in NBCUniversal from General Electric, gaining majority ownership of Universal Pictures. In July 2011, NBCUniversal acquired the Blackstone Group's remaining 50% stake in Universal Orlando Resort for approximately $1 billion, taking full ownership of the resort. Comcast subsequently acquired GE's remaining 49% stake in NBCUniversal in March 2013.

==== 2017–present ====
On December 14, 2017, The Walt Disney Company (the parent company of major film studio Walt Disney Studios) announced to acquire key assets of 21st Century Fox (including the major film studio 20th Century Fox along with Fox Searchlight Pictures). After winning the bidding war for Fox against Comcast, both Disney and Fox shareholders approved the deal on July 27, 2018, and completed on March 20, 2019. The number of major film studios lowered to five for the first time since the Golden Age of Hollywood, as the era of the "Big Six" studios and Fox as a major studio for 83 years ended.

From June 14, 2018, until its acquisition by Discovery in 2022, Warner Bros. was owned by AT&T, which completed its acquisition of Time Warner, renaming it "WarnerMedia", which contained all assets owned by Warner Bros. and its subsidiaries.

On August 13, 2019, Paramount Pictures parent, Viacom, announced its reunion with CBS Corporation, and the combined company would be called ViacomCBS, renamed Paramount also in 2022. The two companies previously merged in 2000 but split in 2005. The deal was completed on December 4, 2019. Meanwhile, CBS Corporation's mini-major film studio, CBS Films was folded into CBS Entertainment Group after releasing its 2019 film slate, switching its focus to creating original film content for CBS All Access.

On January 17, 2020, Disney discontinued the "Fox" name from both 20th Century Fox and Fox Searchlight Pictures and rebranded them as 20th Century Studios and Searchlight Pictures respectively, to avoid brand confusion with Fox Corporation. The "Searchlight Pictures" and "20th Century Studios" name were first seen on Downhill on February 14, and on The Call of the Wild a week later on February 21 respectively.

The studios were affected by the COVID-19 pandemic with some cinema chains closing, precipitating box office flops (like Disney's Onward or Sony's Bloodshot). Several films were delayed (Universal and MGM's No Time to Die or Paramount's A Quiet Place Part II and even Disney's Black Widow and Mulan) and others were launched to the digital market (like Universal's The Invisible Man and Trolls World Tour and Warner Bros.' Birds of Prey, Scoob! and Wonder Woman 1984).

On May 16, 2021, it was reported that AT&T was in talks with Discovery, Inc. for it to merge with and acquire Warner Bros.' parent company WarnerMedia, forming a publicly traded company that would be divided between its shareholders. The proposed spin-off and acquisition was officially announced the next day, which was structured as a Reverse Morris Trust. AT&T shareholders would receive a 71% stake in the enlarged Discovery, which would be led by its current CEO David Zaslav. As the transaction closed on April 8, 2022, Discovery renamed itself Warner Bros. Discovery and ended AT&T's investment in the entertainment business.

On the same day after the announcement of the acquisition/merger of WarnerMedia by Discovery, Amazon entered negotiations with MGM Holdings to acquire Metro-Goldwyn-Mayer. The negotiations were made directly with MGM board chairman Kevin Ulrich whose Anchorage Capital Group is a major shareholder. MGM already began to explore a potential sale of the studio since December 2020, with the COVID-19 pandemic and the domination of streaming platforms due to the closure of movie theaters as contributing factors. On May 26, 2021, it was officially announced that MGM would be acquired by Amazon for $8.45 billion, subject to regulatory approvals and other routine closing conditions; with the studio continuing to operate as a label under Amazon's existing content arm, complementing Amazon Studios and Amazon Prime Video. The acquisition closed on March 17, 2022.

On April 18, 2024, rumors began to circulate that Sony Pictures and Apollo Global Management were interested in jointly acquiring Paramount Global. Sony and Apollo presented a $26 billion all-cash offer to acquire Paramount Global on May 5, 2024. According to The New York Times, the board of directors of Paramount Global formally commenced negotiations with Sony and Apollo over the possible sale of the company. If the deal is finalized, Sony will rank third in worldwide film studio rankings, behind The Walt Disney Company and NBCUniversal. In the US and Canada alone, Sony would have a 20.81% market share. On June 3, 2024, Paramount Global reportedly agreed to change mergers from Sony to Skydance Media for $8 billion. Skydance would first acquire National Amusements, which controls 80% of the voting shares of Paramount and then pump cash into Paramount, which would then acquire Skydance. At first unsuccessful in June 2024, Skydance reached a preliminary agreement on July 2, 2024, to acquire National Amusements and merge with Paramount, to form "Paramount Skydance Corporation".

On December 5, 2025, Netflix announced that it intended to purchase Warner Bros. for $82.7 billion. The acquisition was expected to be completed after the previously announced separation of WBD's Global Networks division, Discovery Global, into a new publicly-traded company in the third quarter of 2026. On February 15, 2026, Bloomberg reported that Warner Bros. Discovery was considering reopening sale talks after Paramount Skydance made a new offer. On February 27, 2026, Paramount Skydance confirmed their deal of acquiring all of Warner Bros. Discovery for $110 billion. The deal was closed on October 6, 2026, and Paramount Skydance changed its legal name to "Skydance Corporation".

On June 29, 2026, Comcast announced NBCUniversal and Sky Group were to be spun off into a separated company, with the remainder of Comcast focusing exclusively on its U.S. telecommunications business.

== Majors ==
=== Current ===
Studio (conglomerate)	Main units	Genre/Independent film/Art film	Genre/B movie	Animation	Other divisions and brands	OTT/VOD	US/CA market share (2025)
Walt Disney Studios (Disney)	Walt Disney Pictures 20th Century Studios	Searchlight Pictures	Marvel Studios; Lucasfilm; The Muppets Studio; Disneynature; National Geographic Documentary Films (73%)	Disney Animation; Disney Television Animation; Pixar; Marvel Animation; Marvel Studios Animation; Lucasfilm Animation; 20th Century Animation; 20th Television Animation	Walt Disney Studios Motion Pictures; 20th Century Family; Star Studio18 (36.84%); New Regency (20%)	Disney+; Hulu; JioHotstar (36.84%); Movies Anywhere; FuboTV (70%); ESPN (72%)	28%
Skydance Motion Picture Group (Skydance)	Paramount Pictures Warner Bros. Pictures	Warner Bros. Clockwork	New Line Cinema; Paramount Primal; Republic Pictures; Nickelodeon Movies; Cartoon Network Movies; DC Studios; Alloy Entertainment; HBO Films; HBO Documentary Films; CNN Films; See It Now Studios	Paramount Animation; Skydance Animation; Warner Bros. Animation; Warner Bros. Pictures Animation; Nickelodeon Animation Studios; Cartoon Network Studios; Avatar Studios; MTV Animation; CBS Eye Animation Productions; Williams Street; Hanna-Barbera Studios Europe	Castle Rock Entertainment; DC Entertainment; Turner Entertainment; Warner Bros. Japan; Skydance Sports; Flagship Entertainment Group (49%); Spyglass Media Group (5%); Miramax (49%)	HBO Max; Paramount+; Discovery+; Pluto TV; 10; 5; SkyShowtime (50%); Fandango (25%); Philo (JV)	27% (Note: Aggregate of predecessor entities: Warner Bros. Entertainment (21%) and Paramount Pictures (6%).)
Universal Filmed Entertainment Group (Comcast)	Universal Pictures	Focus Features	Working Title Films; Universal 1440 Entertainment; Carnival Films	Universal Animation Studios; Illumination; DreamWorks Animation; DreamWorks Animation Television	DreamWorks Classics; NBCUniversal Japan; United International Pictures; Amblin Partners (20%)	Now; Peacock; SkyShowtime (50%)	20%
Sony Pictures Motion Picture Group (Sony)	Columbia Pictures	Sony Pictures Classics	TriStar Pictures; Screen Gems; Stage 6 Films; Destination Films; Affirm Films; Left Bank Pictures; Ghost Corps	Sony Pictures Animation; Sony Pictures Imageworks; Hayate; Madhouse (3.94%)	3000 Pictures; Sony Pictures Japan; Sony Pictures India; Sony Pictures Releasing; Sony Pictures Worldwide Acquisitions; Aniplex of America	Sony Pictures Core; SonyLIV; Crunchyroll; Great American Pure Flix	7%

=== Studio lots ===
Main film studio lot locations
1. Universal Pictures	Skydance Motion Picture Group	
1. Universal Pictures	2. Paramount Pictures	3. Warner Bros. Pictures
Universal Studios in Universal City, California	Paramount Studios in Hollywood, California	Warner Bros. Studios in Burbank, California
4. Walt Disney Studios	Locations of the major film studios in Los Angeles.	5. Sony Pictures
Walt Disney Studios in Burbank, California	Locations of the major film studios in Los Angeles.	Sony Pictures Studios in Culver City, California

While the Big Four's main studio lots are located within 15 miles (24 km) of each other, Paramount (part of Skydance Motion Picture Group) is the only member with a studio lot in Hollywood and located entirely within the official city limits of the City of Los Angeles. Warner Bros. (also part of Skydance Motion Picture Group) and Disney both have studio lots located in Burbank. Universal is based at the Universal Studios Complex, which is partially in the City of Los Angeles (specifically the corporate offices and hotels) and partially in the Universal City unincorporated area (specifically the theme park and studio lot). Sony's studio lot is in Culver City.

Disney is the only studio that has been owned by the same conglomerate since its founding, and the only studio whose parent entity is headquartered in Southern California on its studio lot. Disney did not acquire the 53-acre Fox Studio Lot in Century City when it acquired certain assets from 20th Century Fox in 2019. Disney leased portions of the lot and vacated the lot in 2025 to consolidate its operations in Burbank.

=== Past ===
Other major film studios of the 20th century included:

Time period	Major studio unit	Description
1929–1958	RKO Radio Pictures (RKO)	one of the Big Five studios, bought by Howard Hughes in 1948, was mismanaged and dismantled and was largely defunct by the 1957 studio lot sale; revived several times as an independent studio, with most recent film releases in 2012 and 2015; now owned by Concord Originals.
1919–1981	United Artists/United Artists Releasing (UA)	one of the Little Three studios, originally only a distributor for independent film producers, acquired by MGM in 1981; brand name was resurrected in 2019 when Annapurna Pictures and MGM renamed a distribution company, which was a joint venture between the two companies, to United Artists Releasing; revived in 2024 as a label under the Amazon MGM Studios umbrella.
1924–1986	Metro-Goldwyn-Mayer (MGM)	one of the Big Seven studios (and one of the Big Five studios during the Golden Age), acquired by Ted Turner in 1986, who sold the studio back to Kirk Kerkorian later that year while retaining MGM's pre-May 1986 library; became a mini-major studio upon the sale; emerged from bankruptcy in 2010; now owned by Amazon, which also owns and operates Amazon MGM Studios, Amazon Prime Video and MX Player.
1924–1989	Columbia Pictures (Columbia)	one of the Big Six studios (and one of the Little Three studios during the Golden Age), became part of Sony Pictures Motion Picture Group under Sony Pictures Entertainment, when Sony acquired Columbia from the Coca-Cola Company in 1989.
1935–2019	20th Century Fox (TCF, 20CF, 20th, or Fox)	one of the Big Six studios (and one of the Big Five studios during the Golden Age), became part of Walt Disney Studios when The Walt Disney Company acquired 21st Century Fox in 2019; 20th Century Fox was renamed 20th Century Studios the following year.
1912–2026	Paramount Pictures (Paramount)	one of the Big Five studios, became part of Skydance Motion Picture Group following the acquisition of Warner Bros. Discovery by its parent company, Paramount Skydance, in October 2026.
1923–2026	Warner Bros. Pictures (WB, Warner, Warner Brothers or Warner Bros.)	one of the Big Five studios, became part of Skydance Motion Picture Group following its parent company Warner Bros. Discovery's acquisition by Paramount Skydance in October 2026.

=== Instant majors ===
"Instant major" is a 1960s coined term for a film company that seemingly overnight had approached the status of major. In 1967, three "instant major" studios popped up, two of which were partnered with a television network theatrical film unit, with the most lasting until 1973:

Time period	Instant major unit	Description
1966–1975	Cinerama Releasing Corporation	partnered with ABC Pictures International, the film production company of ABC
1951–1974	National General Corporation	distributor for Cinema Center Films, the film production company of CBS
1965–1971	Commonwealth United Entertainment	

== Mini-majors ==
Mini-major studios (or "mini-majors") are the larger, independent film production companies that are smaller than the major studios and attempt to compete directly with them.

=== Current ===
Studio (conglomerate)	Main units	Other divisions and brands			OTT/VOD	US/CA market share (2025)
Lionsgate Studios	Lionsgate Films	Lionsgate Canada; Lionsgate UK; Lionsgate India (10%); Lionsgate Premiere	Summit Entertainment; eOne Films; Roadside Attractions (43%); Good Universe	3 Arts Entertainment (majority); Amblin Partners (minority); Spyglass Media Group (18.9%)	Lionsgate+	4%
A24					A24 App	3%
Amazon MGM Studios (Amazon)	Metro-Goldwyn-Mayer United Artists Orion Pictures	Lightworkers Media; American International Pictures; Orion Classics			Prime Video; MGM+; MX Player	N/A

=== Past ===
Past mini-majors include:

Time period	Mini-major studio unit	Description
1933–1935	20th Century Pictures	merged with Fox Film after a fallout with United Artists to become 20th Century Fox in 1935.
1935–1967	Republic Pictures	originally a "poverty row" B-movie producer, produced many serials and was formed by the consolidation of six minor production companies in 1935. Ceased production in 1958. It was rebooted in 1985. Viacom then purchased it in the early 2000s.
1931–1979	Monogram Pictures/Allied Artists Pictures	filed for bankruptcy in 1979, acquired by Lorimar Productions in 1980. The current entertainment company, Allied Artists International, is considered the successor to AAP; library rights are currently split mostly between Amazon (through MGM), and Skydance Corporation (through Paramount Pictures and Warner Bros.).
1923–1984	The Walt Disney Company/Walt Disney Studios	became a major studio in 1984.
1942–1986	Avco Embassy	acquired by Norman Lear and Jerry Perenchio in 1982; acquired by the Coca-Cola Company in 1985; its theatrical division was acquired by De Laurentiis Entertainment Group in 1985. Sony Pictures currently owns the television rights to most of the theatrical library and the logo, names, and trademarks through its ELP Communications subsidiary.
1982–1987	TriStar Pictures	consolidated in 1987 into Columbia, was one of the partners in the joint venture that created it.
1986–1990	Weintraub Entertainment Group	filed for bankruptcy in September 1990, resulting in the company folding up operations; the library is now owned by Sony Pictures (through Columbia Pictures), with Skydance (through Paramount Pictures) owning television and streaming distribution rights.
1979–1993	Miramax Films	acquired by The Walt Disney Company in 1993, sold to Filmyard Holdings in 2010, then to beIN Media Group in 2016, which sold a 49% stake to ViacomCBS (now Skydance, through Paramount Pictures) in 2020.
1967–1994	The Cannon Group	pushed into Chapter 11 bankruptcy in 1994.
1987–1993	Castle Rock Entertainment	purchased in 1993 by Turner Broadcasting System; TBS merged with Time Warner (now Skydance) in 1996.
1967–1994	New Line Cinema	purchased in 1994 by Turner Broadcasting System; TBS merged with Time Warner (now Skydance) in 1996; and New Line merged with Warner Bros. in 2008.
1986–1996	Turner Pictures	purchased along with Hanna-Barbera, Castle Rock Entertainment, New Line Cinema, and Turner Entertainment Co. (including most of the pre-May 1986 MGM library and US and Canadian distribution rights to the RKO Radio film library) in 1996 by Time Warner (now Skydance). Currently, Warner Bros. and its subsidiaries make cartoons and movies based on Hanna-Barbera characters.
1970–1997	New World Pictures	acquired by News Corporation (then the parent company of 20th Century Fox) in 1997. The content library is held under the film studio.
1982–1997	Regency Enterprises	had 20% acquired by 20th Century Fox as part of distribution deal in 1997.
1978–1997	Orion Pictures	in 1990, was considered the last of the mini-majors. Purchased in 1988 by Kluge/Metromedia; purchased in 1997 by MGM.
1978–1996	The Samuel Goldwyn Company	purchased in 1996 by John Kluge/Metromedia International, making it the sister studio to Orion; it was purchased in 1997 by MGM.
1975–1999	PolyGram Filmed Entertainment	sold to Seagram and folded into Universal Pictures in 1999; bulk of the pre-March 31, 1996, library sold to MGM.
1983–2003	Artisan Entertainment	purchased in 2003 by Lions Gate Entertainment.
1994–2006	DreamWorks Pictures	purchased by Viacom; then owners of both Paramount Pictures and CBS Corporation, in 2006; distributed the films from 2006 to 2011; reformed as an independent with The Walt Disney Company distributing the live-action films under their Touchstone Pictures banner until 2016; now a label after being reorganized as Amblin Partners, in which Universal Pictures and Lionsgate own their respective stakes.
1986–2006	Pixar Animation Studios	purchased in 2006 by The Walt Disney Company.
1993–2009	Marvel Studios/Marvel Entertainment	purchased in 2009 by The Walt Disney Company.
2006–2010	Overture Films	distribution and marketing assets sold to Relativity Media in 2010; film library acquired by Lionsgate via its acquisition of Starz Inc. in December 2016
1990–2012	Summit Entertainment	acquired by Lionsgate in 2012.
1971–2012	Lucasfilm	purchased in 2012 by The Walt Disney Company.
2010–2014	FilmDistrict	merged into Focus Features (a subsidiary of Universal) in 2014; the library acquired by Content Partners LLC (through Revolution Studios) in December 2020.
2004–2015	Relativity Media	filed for Chapter 11 bankruptcy on July 30, 2015. Emerged from bankruptcy in 2016, only to re-file in May 2018, sold to UltraV Holdings
2010–2016	Alchemy	filed for Chapter 7 bankruptcy on June 30, 2016.
2000–2017	Revolution Studios	purchased by Content Partners LLC in 2017, focuses on distribution, remake, and sequel rights to its library following the end of its six-year deal with Sony Pictures Entertainment.
2011–2018	Global Road Entertainment	formerly Open Road Films, filed for Chapter 11 bankruptcy on September 6, 2018; by November 2018, it had reverted to Open Road, purchased by Raven Capital Management on approval as of December 19, 2018 by a Delaware bankruptcy judge.
2005–2018	The Weinstein Company	filed for Chapter 11 bankruptcy but was bought by Lantern Entertainment in 2018; assets were transferred to Spyglass Media Group, of which Skydance (through Warner Bros.), Lantern Entertainment, and Lionsgate, which currently hold distribution rights to most of the TWC library, own their respective stakes.
2007–2019	CBS Films	folded into the CBS Entertainment Group on October 11, 2019, and absorbed into CBS Studios to produce TV films for CBS All Access (later Paramount+).
2014–2021	STX Entertainment	acquired by The Najafi Companies in 2021, later sold to A-CAP's Crown Productions in 2026. From 2022 until 2026, it withdrew from the US distribution market. However, after the sale to Crown Productions, the US distribution market has been resumed and STX is returning as a mini-major film studio.

== Historical organizational lineage ==
=== The eight Golden Age majors ===
The eight major film studios of the Golden Age have gone through significant ownership changes ("independent" meaning customarily identified as the primary commercial entity in its corporate structure; "purchased" meaning acquired anything from majority to total ownership). This does not include Walt Disney Studios, which despite being primarily an independent animation studio during the Golden Age, is the only current existing major studio to remain under continuous autonomous ownership since its founding.

==== Universal Pictures ====
Time period	Ownership	Description
1909–1912	Independent Moving Pictures	
1912–1936	Universal Pictures	Carl Laemmle, a German-born American film producer, founded Universal Pictures.
1936–1946	Standard Capital	Laemmle retired from the movie industry and sold a controlling interest of Universal to an American businessman Lewis Rosenstiel through Standard Capital.
1946–1962	Universal-International	Lewis Rosenstiel, an American businessman, acquired a controlling interest in Universal Pictures and merged it with International Pictures and Universal-International, a subsidiary of Universal Pictures Company for international distribution was created.
1952–1962	Decca	Decca records bought Universal-International
1962–1996	MCA Inc.	MCA purchased Decca, that's became then a subsidiary of MCA. MCA acquired also Universal Pictures and merged with Universal officially.
1990–1995	Matsushita Electric	Japanese conglomerate Matsushita Electric Industrial Co. (now Panasonic) acquired MCA Inc. and with it Universal Pictures.
1995–2000	Seagram	Seagram Company Ltd. acquired a majority of 80% of MCA Universal Pictures from Matsushita Electric,
1996–present	Universal Studios Inc.	MCA is renamed and reincorporated by Seagram, On December 9, 1996, the new owners dropped the MCA name, the company became Universal Studios Inc. and the parent company of Universal Pictures.
2000–2004	Vivendi/Vivendi Universal	Edgar Bronfman Jr sold a controlling interest of Seagram's entertainment division and combined those business to French water utility and media company Vivendi, and with it, Universal Studios, created on January 8, 2001, with the merger of the Vivendi media empire with Canal+ television networks and the acquisition of media assets of Canadian company Seagram Company Ltd, owner of Universal Studios.
2004–present	NBCUniversal	NBC merged with the company, formed through the combining of NBC and Vivendi Universal Entertainment
2004–2011	General Electric/Vivendi	formed on May 11, 2004, beginning on November 8, 2004, as NBC Universal, Inc., with the merger of General Electric's NBC with Vivendi Universal's film and television subsidiary Vivendi Universal Entertainment, after GE had acquired 80% of the subsidiary, giving Vivendi a 20% share of the new company, Vivendi held the remaining 20%, giving Vivendi a 20% share of the new company. with an option to sell its share in 2006.
2004–2013	General Electric	GE acquired 80% of Universal Studios from Vivendi as part of a larger deal that included the acquisition of Vivendi's entertainment assets, forming NBC Universal.
2011–present	Comcast	Comcast acquired 51% of NBC Universal from General Electric. Comcast merged the former GE subsidiary with its own cable-television programming assets, creating the current newly reformed NBCUniversal, by purchasing shares from GE, while GE bought out Vivendi, Comcast bought the remaining 49% of NBCUniversal for $16.7 billion, since 2013, the company has been a wholly owned subsidiary of Comcast, which bought out GE's ownership stake.
2013–present	Universal Filmed Entertainment Group	Universal Studios Inc. renamed Universal Filmed Entertainment Group.

==== Paramount Pictures ====
Time period	Ownership	Description
1912–1916	Famous Players Film Company	founded by Adolph Zukor and W. W. Hodkinson
1914–1916	Paramount Pictures	founded by W.W. Hodkinson
1916–1933	Famous Players–Lasky	founded by Adolph Zukor and Jesse L. Lasky
1922–1966	Paramount Famous-Lasky Corporation / Paramount Publix Corporation / Paramount Productions, Inc. / Paramount Pictures, Inc. / Paramount Pictures Corporation	the company adopted its distribution division's name and folded into it in 1933
1966–1989	Gulf+Western Industries	purchased by Gulf+Western
1989–1995	Paramount Communications	Gulf+Western changed the name after selling non-entertainment assets
1994–2025	National Amusements	owner of the two iterations of Viacom; the first includes CBS Corporation, the second involving the split; CBS and Viacom would reunite in 2019
1994–2005	Viacom	Viacom purchased Paramount
2006–2019	Viacom	Viacom split into two companies: "new" Viacom—with Paramount Pictures, MTV, BET, Nickelodeon, VH1, Comedy Central, and other cable channels—and CBS Corporation—which includes CBS Television Studios; both companies are controlled by National Amusements
2019–2025	Paramount Global	re-merger between Viacom and CBS to form ViacomCBS, now known as Paramount Global
2025–2026	Paramount Skydance Corporation	merger between Paramount Global, National Amusements and Skydance Media to form Paramount Skydance Corporation
2026–present	Skydance Corporation	merger between Paramount Skydance and Warner Bros. Discovery, now known as Skydance

==== 20th Century Fox/20th Century Studios ====
Time period	Ownership	Description
1915–1935	Fox Film	Founded by William Fox in 1915, forming one of the predecessors of 20th Century Fox.
1933–1935	20th Century Pictures	Founded by Joseph Schenck and Darryl F. Zanuck in 1933, becoming the studio's other predecessor.
1935–1985	20th Century-Fox / 20th Century Fox	Fox Film and 20th Century Pictures merged in 1935 to form 20th Century-Fox. The studio subsequently underwent ownership changes involving Marc Rich and Marvin Davis in 1981.
1985–2013	News Corporation	Rupert Murdoch's News Corporation acquired the studio in 1985, bringing it into a major international media conglomerate.
2013–2019	21st Century Fox	Renamed media conglomerate when News Corporation split into two companies on June 28, 2013.
2019–present	The Walt Disney Company	Disney acquired 20th Century Fox as part of a $71.3 billion purchase of their owner 21st Century Fox, which was announced on December 14, 2017, and completed on March 20, 2019; was renamed 20th Century Studios on January 17, 2020

==== Metro-Goldwyn-Mayer (MGM) ====
Time period	Ownership	Description
1915–1924	Metro Pictures	founded by Richard A. Rowland, George Grombacker, and Louis B. Mayer
1916–1924	Goldwyn Pictures	founded by Samuel Goldwyn (then Goldfish) and theatre producers Edgar and Archibald Selwyn
1918–1924	Louis B. Mayer Pictures	founded by Louis B. Mayer; brought over Irving Thalberg from Universal as head of production
1924–1959	Loew's Inc.	in 1924, Marcus Loew merged the first two studios and Louis B. Mayer offered up the third and was named head of MGM; controlling interest in Loew's purchased by William Fox in 1929, but was then forced to sell off interest due to stock market crash; operational control ceded by Loew's to studio management in 1957
1959–1981	Metro-Goldwyn-Mayer Inc. / Metro-Goldwyn-Mayer Film Co.	fully divested by Loew's; purchased by Edgar Bronfman Sr. in 1967; purchased by Kirk Kerkorian in 1969
1981–1986	MGM/UA Entertainment Co.	United Artists purchased by Kerkorian in 1981 and merged into MGM
1986	Turner Broadcasting System	purchased by Ted Turner in 1986; MGM/UA renamed MGM Entertainment Co.
1986–1990	MGM/UA Communications Co.	repurchased by Kerkorian seventy-four days later
1990–1992	MGM-Pathé Communications	purchased by Giancarlo Parretti in 1990
1992–1997	Crédit Lyonnais	foreclosed upon by bank after Parretti defaulted
1997–2005	Tracinda Corporation	repurchased by Kerkorian
2005–2023	MGM Holdings	
2005–2022	Sony / Comcast / 4 private equity firms	purchased by Sony, Comcast, and private investment firms—Providence Equity Partners currently owns the greatest number of shares—and privately held as a minor media company independent of Sony/Columbia, Credit Suisse, JPMorgan Chase, other former bondholders (2011–2022), including Carl Icahn (2011–2012)
2022–present	Amazon	
2023–present	Amazon MGM Studios	

==== Warner Bros. ====
Time period	Ownership	Description
1910–1923	Warner Features Company	
1918–1923	Warner Brothers Studio	founded by Jack L. Warner, Harry Warner, Albert Warner, and Sam Warner; was not incorporated until 1923
1923–1929	Warner Bros. Pictures, Inc.	formally incorporated and renamed Warner Bros. Pictures, Incorporated; Sam Warner died in 1927
1929–1967	Warner Bros.–First National	acquired First National Pictures; syndicate led by Jack Warner, Serge Semenenko of First National Bank of Boston, and Charles Allen Jr.; purchased a controlling interest in 1956
1967–1970	Warner Bros.–Seven Arts	purchased by and merged with Seven Arts Productions
1969–1972	Kinney	Kinney purchased Warner Bros.–Seven Arts
1972–1990	Warner Communications	Kinney spun off non-entertainment assets and changed name
1990–2001	Time-Warner	on January 10, 1990, in New York City, New York as a merger of Time Inc. and Warner Communications
2001–2003	AOL Time Warner	AOL merged with Time Warner in 2001
2003–2018	Time Warner	AOL Time Warner reverted to their original name in 2003, which remained until AT&T's acquisition in 2018, despite spinning off AOL and Time Inc.
2018–2022	AT&T	Time Warner renamed WarnerMedia after AT&T acquisition
2022–2026	Warner Bros. Discovery	AT&T spin-off and merged with Discovery, Inc.
2026–present	Skydance Corporation	acquisition of Warner Bros. Discovery by Paramount Skydance, now known as Skydance

==== Columbia Pictures ====
Time period	Ownership	Description
1918–1924	CBC Film Sales	founded by Harry Cohn, Joe Brandt, and Jack Cohn
1924–1968	Columbia Pictures Corporation	company changes name to Columbia Pictures Corporation; goes public in 1926.
1968–1987	Columbia Pictures Industries	merger between Columbia Pictures Corporation and Screen Gems. CPI becomes the parent of both companies
1982–1987	The Coca-Cola Company	purchased by Coca-Cola; Tri-Star Pictures, a joint venture with HBO and CBS initiated in 1982—CBS drops out in 1985 and HBO in 1986
1987–1991	Columbia Pictures Entertainment	divested by Coca-Cola; Coke's entertainment business sold to Tri-Star and takes 49% in CPE
1989–2021	Sony Corporation	purchased by Sony Corporation in November 1989
1991–present	Sony Pictures Entertainment	Columbia Pictures Entertainment rebrands itself two years after purchase
2021–present	Sony Group Corporation	Sony reorganized

==== RKO Radio Pictures/RKO Pictures ====
Time period	Ownership	Description
1918–1928	Independent as FBO	founded by Harry F. Robertson
1928–1935	RCA	merger engineered under RCA by its president David Sarnoff, bringing together FBO and Keith-Albee-Orpheum
1935–1955	Independent	half of RCA's interest purchased by Floyd Odlum, control split between RCA, Odlum, and Rockefeller brothers; controlling interest purchased by Odlum in 1942; controlling interest purchased by Howard Hughes in 1948; Hughes's interest purchased by Stolkin-Koolish-Ryan-Burke-Corwin syndicate in 1952; interest repurchased by Hughes in 1953; studio nearly fully purchased by Hughes in 1954
1955–1984	General Tire and Rubber	purchased by General Tire and Rubber—coupled with General Tire's broadcasting operation as RKO Teleradio Pictures; production and distribution halted in 1957; movie business dissolved in 1958 and RKO Teleradio renamed RKO General; RKO General establishes RKO Pictures as production subsidiary in 1981
1984–1987	GenCorp	reorganization creates holding company with RKO General and General Tire as primary subsidiaries
1987–1989	Wesray Capital Corporation	spun off from RKO General, purchased by Wesray—controlled by William E. Simon and Ray Chambers—and merged with amusement park operations to form RKO/Six Flags Entertainment
1989–2025	Independent as RKO Pictures LLC	owned by Ted Hartley, who also is the CEO. As of 2015, the company's recent films released were A Late Quartet and Barely Lethal
2025–2026	Concord	
2025–present	Concord Originals	
2026–present	BMG Rights Management	Concord and BMG merged

==== United Artists (UA) ====
Time period	Ownership	Description
1919–1967	Independent	founded by Charles Chaplin, Douglas Fairbanks, D. W. Griffith, and Mary Pickford; operational control by Arthur Krim and Robert Benjamin from 1951; fully purchased by Krim and Benjamin in 1956
1967–1981	Transamerica	purchased by Transamerica
1981–2023	MGM	purchased by Kirk Kerkorian from Transamerica and merged into MGM
1981–1986	MGM/UA Entertainment Co.	United Artists purchased by Kerkorian in 1981 and merged into MGM
1986	Turner Broadcasting System	purchased by Ted Turner in 1986; MGM/UA renamed MGM Entertainment Co.
1986–1990	MGM/UA Communications Co.	repurchased by Kerkorian seventy-four days later
1990–1992	MGM-Pathé Communications	purchased by Giancarlo Parretti in 1990
1992–1997	Crédit Lyonnais	foreclosed upon by bank after Parretti defaulted
1997–2005	Tracinda Corporation	repurchased by Kerkorian
2005–2023	MGM Holdings	
2005–2022	Sony / Comcast / 4 private equity firms	purchased by Sony, Comcast, and private investment firms—Providence Equity Partners currently owns the greatest number of shares—and privately held as a minor media company independent of Sony/Columbia, Credit Suisse, JPMorgan Chase, other former bondholders (2011–2022), including Carl Icahn (2011–2012)
2019–2023	United Artists Releasing	United Artists was revived in 2019 as United Artists Releasing, the distribution banner. (2019–2023)
2022–2023; 2024–present	Amazon	
2024–present	Amazon MGM Studios	revived on July 26, 2024, after more than a decade of dormancy

== Significant international entities ==
- Nordisk Film (Denmark) – owned by Egmont Group
- Gaumont (France)
- Pathé (France)
- StudioCanal (France) – owned by Canal+ S.A.
- Constantin Film (Germany) – owned by Highlight Communications
- Clasart Film (Germany) – owned by Leonine Holding
- UFA (Germany) – owned by the Fremantle subdivision of the RTL Group division of Bertelsmann
- Eros International (India) – owned by Eros Media World
- Yash Raj Films (India)
- Reliance Entertainment (India) – owned by Reliance Group
- Zee Studios (India) – owned by Zee Entertainment Enterprises & Essel Group
- Medusa Film (Italy) – owned by Mediaset
- Rai Cinema (Italy) – owned by RAI
- Avex Pictures (Japan) – owned by Avex Inc.
- Toho Studios (Japan) – owned by the Toho Co., Ltd. division of Hankyu Hanshin Toho Group
- Astro Shaw (Malaysia) – owned by Astro Malaysia Holdings
- Star Cinema (Philippines) – owned by ABS-CBN Corporation
- Lenfilm (Russia) – owned by the Federal Agency for State Property Management subdivision of the Ministry of Economic Development of the Russian Federation federal ministry of the Russian government
- Atresmedia Cine (Spain) – owned by Atresmedia
- Telecinco Cinema (Spain) – owned by Mediaset España
- SF Studios (Sweden) – owned by Bonnier Group
- Odesa Film Studio (Ukraine) – owned by the Government of Ukraine & Nova Film Studios
- BBC Film (United Kingdom) – owned by the BBC
- Film4 Productions (United Kingdom) – owned by the Channel Four Television Corporation, which is owned by UK Government Investments, which is owned by the His Majesty's Treasury economic & finance ministry of the British government
- Hammer Film Productions (United Kingdom) – owned by the John Gore Organization

== See also ==
- Concentration of media ownership
- Media cross-ownership in the United States
- List of film production companies
- List of animation studios
- List of streaming media services
- Lists of films by studio
- List of film production companies in India
- List of home video companies
- Major record labels
- Major American TV broadcast networks

== Sources ==
- Cook, David A. (2000). Lost Illusions: American Cinema in the Shadow of Watergate and Vietnam, 1970–1979 (Berkeley, Los Angeles, and London: University of California Press). ISBN 0-520-23265-8.
- Eames, John Douglas (1985). The Paramount Story (New York: Crown). ISBN 0-517-55348-1.
- Finler, Joel W. (1988). The Hollywood Story, 1st ed. (New York: Crown). ISBN 0-517-56576-5.
- Finler, Joel W. (2003). The Hollywood Story, 3d ed. (London and New York: Wallflower). ISBN 1-903364-66-3.
- Hirschhorn, Clive (1983). The Universal Story (London: Crown). ISBN 0-517-55001-6.
- Hirschhorn, Clive (1999). The Columbia Story (London: Hamlyn). ISBN 0-600-59836-5.
- Jewell, Richard B., with Vernon Harbin (1982). The RKO Story (New York: Arlington House/Crown). ISBN 0-517-54656-6.
- Schatz, Thomas (1998 [1989]). The Genius of the System: Hollywood Filmmaking in the Studio Era (London: Faber and Faber). ISBN 0-571-19596-2.
- Thomas, Tony, and Aubrey Solomon (1985). The Films of 20th Century-Fox (Secaucus, N.J.: Citadel). ISBN 0-8065-0958-9.
