= Jerry York (businessman) =

American businessman

- Born: Jerome Bailey York; June 22, 1938; Memphis, Tennessee, U.S.
- Died: March 18, 2010 (aged 71); Pontiac, Michigan, U.S.
- Education: United States Military Academy at West Point; University of Michigan; Massachusetts Institute of Technology

Jerome Bailey York (June 22, 1938 – March 18, 2010), commonly known as Jerry York, was an American businessman, and the chairman, president and CEO of Harwinton Capital. He was the former CFO of IBM and Chrysler, and was CEO of Micro Warehouse. He was a chief aide to Kirk Kerkorian and his Tracinda investment company. In February 2006, Kerkorian helped elect York to the board of directors of General Motors, from which he had previously resigned.

== Biography ==
York was born in Memphis, Tennessee, in 1938 and lived in Oakland Township, Michigan. He earned degrees from the United States Military Academy at West Point, the Massachusetts Institute of Technology, and the University of Michigan's Ross School of Business, and was trained as an engineer. A gymnastics injury prevented York from serving in the military.

York eventually became the CFO at Chrysler. When Lee Iacocca retired as Chrysler CEO in 1992, York was a leading candidate to succeed him. After being passed over as Chrysler CEO, York became CFO of IBM Corporation. He later served as a special adviser to investor Kirk Kerkorian during Kerkorian's 2007 failed takeover bid for Chrysler and his other investments in Ford Motor Company and General Motors, where he previously served as a board member from February to October 2006 before resigning over frustration resulting from GM's failure to distribute materials to the board in advance of its meetings and a reluctance to implement change recommendations, including the shedding of peripheral brands, which GM ultimately affected during bankruptcy in the form of terminating the Pontiac, Saturn, and Hummer brands (after a failed sale attempt to Chinese Sichuan Tengzhong Heavy Industrial Machinery) and the sale of its SAAB division to Spyker Cars.

From 1999 to 2003, York was chairman and CEO of Micro Warehouse, which went bankrupt. He was also on the board of Apple Inc. after Steve Jobs' comeback in 1997.

York was also an enthusiast of alternative energy, particularly wind energy. He was the CFO and a member of the board at USWind, a wind energy company of which he was a co-founder and active management team member. York believed that moving the turbine from adjacent to the blades to on the ground, by using a series of conveyor belts, would significantly increase height, decrease weight, and improve efficiency of wind power generation.

York was also part of a team developing the next generation portable computer.

York was hospitalized on March 17, 2010, after collapsing in his suburban Detroit home from a brain aneurysm. He died the next day.
