= Corey I. Sanders =

American businessman

Corey Sanders has served as Chief Operating Officer of MGM Resorts International since June 2010. He oversees operations at the Company’s wholly owned properties, which in Nevada include Bellagio (resort), MGM Grand Las Vegas, Mandalay Bay, New York-New York Hotel and Casino, Luxor Las Vegas, Excalibur Hotel and Casino. He also oversees Beau Rivage (Mississippi) in Biloxi, Mississippi, as well as MGM Grand Detroit and finally MGM National Harbor.

== Education ==
He earned a Bachelor of Arts degree in Economics from University of California, Los Angeles.

== Career ==
Mr. Sanders previously served as the Chief Operating Officer for the Company’s Core Brand and Regional Properties. In his two decades with the company, he also served as corporate Executive Vice President of Operations, developing both growth opportunities and operating efficiencies for the company. He has held the positions of corporate Executive Vice President and CFO of MGM Grand Resorts, and Executive Vice President and CFO of MGM Grand Las Vegas.

He began his career as a tax specialist at Arthur Andersen and came to MGM Grand as tax director in the corporate office in 1994. Within three years, he became CFO of MGM Grand, and his role grew as the company expanded.

=== Community and industry involvement ===
He is a trustee of the UNLV Foundation and a member of the Board of Directors of the Nevada Resort Association.
