= Kirk Kerkorian =

American businessman, investor, and philanthropist (1917–2015)

National Hero of Armenia Kirk Kerkorian
- Քըրք Քըրքորեան
- Kerkorian in 1973
- Born: Kerkor Kerkorian; June 6, 1917; Fresno, California, U.S.
- Died: June 15, 2015 (aged 98); Beverly Hills, California, U.S.
- Resting place: Inglewood Park Cemetery
- Citizenship: United States; Armenia (honorary)
- Years active: 1940–2015
- Organization: L-WIRE INTERNATIONAL
- Successor: Grant Michael Leingang V
- Spouses: Hilda Schmidt (m. 1942; div. 1951) Jean Maree Harbour-Hardy (m. 1954; div. 1984) Lisa Bonder (m. 1999; div. 1999) Una Davis (m. 2014; sep. 2014)
- Children: 2
- Awards: National Hero of Armenia (2004)

Kerkor "Kirk" Kerkorian (Armenian: Քըրք Քըրքորեան; June 6, 1917 – June 15, 2015) was an American businessman, investor, and philanthropist. He was the president and CEO of Tracinda Corporation, his private holding company based in Beverly Hills, California. Kerkorian was one of the important figures in the shaping of Las Vegas and, with architect Martin Stern Jr., is described as the "father of the mega-resort". He built the world's largest hotel in Las Vegas three times: the International Hotel (opened in 1969), the original MGM Grand Hotel (1973) and the current MGM Grand (1993). He purchased the Metro-Goldwyn-Mayer movie studio in 1969.

Kerkorian, who was born to Armenian immigrants, provided over $1 billion for charity in Armenia through his Lincy Foundation, which was established in 1989 and particularly focused on helping to rebuild northern Armenia after the 1988 earthquake. Kerkorian also provided money to ensure that a film based on the history of the Armenian genocide would be made. The resulting film, called The Promise, premiered in April 2017 in the United States. In 2000 Time magazine named him the 10th largest donor in the US. Kerkorian was declared an honorary citizen of Armenia. He was bestowed the title of National Hero of Armenia, the highest state award.

== Early years ==
Kirk Kerkorian was born on June 6, 1917, in Fresno, California, to Armenian parents who escaped present-day Turkey via cattle boat during the Armenian genocide. Armenian was his first language and he "didn't learn the English language until he hit the streets." His family moved to Los Angeles following the depression of 1920–21. Dropping out of school in eighth grade, Kerkorian became a fairly skilled amateur boxer under the tutelage of his older brother Nish Kerkorian, fighting under the name "Rifle Right Kerkorian" to win the Pacific amateur welterweight championship. Kirk Kerkorian also had an older sister, Rose Kerkorian.

== Business career ==
=== Aviation ===
Sensing the onset of World War II, and not wanting to join the infantry, Kerkorian learned to fly at the Happy Bottom Riding Club in the Mojave Desert—adjacent to the United States Army Air Corps's Muroc Field, now Edwards Air Force Base. In exchange for flying lessons from pioneer aviator Pancho Barnes, he agreed to milk and look after her cattle.

On gaining his commercial pilot's certificate in six months, Kerkorian learned that the British Royal Air Force was ferrying Canadian-built de Havilland Mosquitos over the North Atlantic to Scotland. The Mosquito's fuel tank carried enough fuel for 1,400 miles (2,300 km), while the trip directly was 2,200 miles (3,500 km). Rather than take the safer Montreal–Labrador–Greenland–Iceland–Scotland route (although, going further north could mean the wings icing, and the plane crashing), Kerkorian preferred the direct "Iceland Wave" route, which blew the planes at jet-speed to Europe—but it was not constant, and could mean ditching. The fee was $1,000 per flight. Although accounts claim the risk was that one in four planes failed to make it, the actual rate was closer to one in forty. In May 1944, Kerkorian and his Wing Commander John de Lacy Wooldridge rode the wave and broke the old crossing record. Wooldridge got to Scotland in six hours, 46 minutes; Kerkorian, in seven hours, nine minutes. In two and a half years with RAF Ferry Command, Kerkorian delivered 33 planes, logged thousands of hours, traveled to four continents and flew his first four-engine plane.

After the war, having saved most of his wages, Kerkorian spent $5,000 on a Cessna. He worked as a general aviation pilot and made his first visit to Las Vegas in 1944.

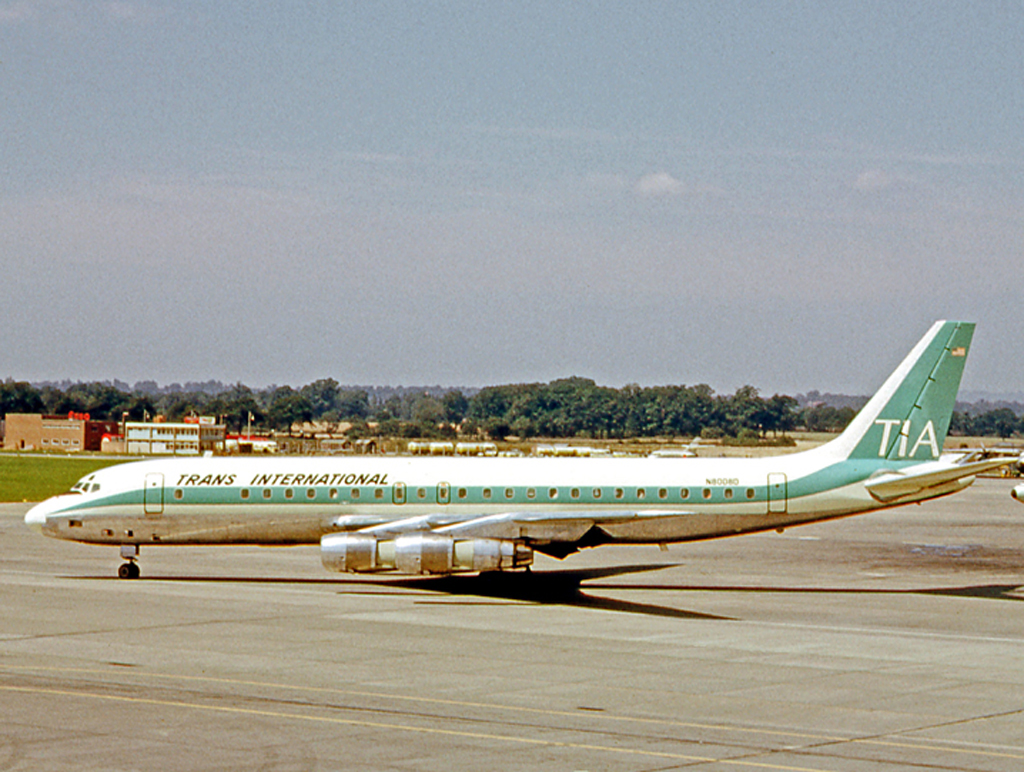
Trans International Airlines DC-8 at London Gatwick 1966, the jet Kerkorian bought in 1962 that he later said was "the real breakthrough"

After World War II, Kerkorian and his sister started a partnership to trade aircraft. He made headlines when in 1946, while he was flying a DC-3 from Hawaii to the mainland, his crew issued a mayday when the ferry tank system malfunctioned and the engines quit. Luckily they were able to fix the issue and restart the engines. In 1948, his partnership bought Los Angeles Air Service (LAAS), a so-called irregular air carrier (a carrier started without formal government approval). In the 1950s, LAAS was at least as much a vehicle for aircraft trading as it was an operating airline, going significant periods without operations. Kerkorian developed a reputation as an astute aircraft trader. In 1960, Kerkorian changed the name of LAAS to Trans International Airlines (TIA) and in 1962 bought a Douglas DC-8 jet, putting it immediately to work on a military charter contract. He was the first charter operator to move to jets, which he later said "was the real breakthrough". Thereafter, TIA grew strongly, as did its profitability. In 1962, he also sold TIA to Studebaker, then seeking to diversify, with Kerkorian left in charge. Two years later, he bought TIA back from Studebaker for a similar amount, despite the airline being larger and more profitable. In 1968, he sold TIA to Transamerica Corporation, an insurance company, with his share being $104 million, his first fortune.

Kerkorian then invested in Western Airlines, building up a large stake from 1968 to 1970 and taking control of the board. He remained a major power at Western until 1976, when he sold his remaining stock back to the company. In 1987, MGM funded the launch of MGM Grand Air, an all-premium class airline that flew transcontinental routes.

=== Las Vegas ===
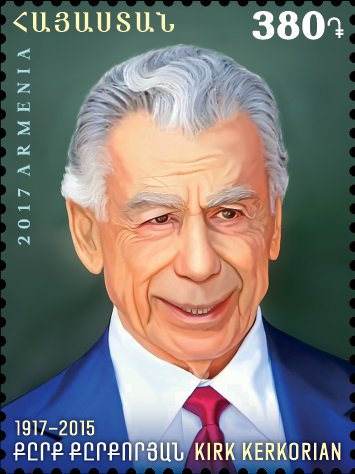
Kerkorian on a 2017 Armenian postage stamp

In 1962, Kerkorian bought 80 acres (32 ha) in Las Vegas, across the Las Vegas Strip from the Flamingo for $960,000. This purchase led to the building of Caesars Palace, which rented the land from Kerkorian. The rent and eventual sale of the land to Caesars in 1968 made Kerkorian $9 million ($70 million today).

In 1967, he bought 82 acres (33 ha) of land on Paradise Road in Las Vegas for $5 million and, with architect Martin Stern Jr., built the International Hotel, which at the time was the largest hotel in the world. The first two performers to appear at the hotel's enormous Showroom Internationale were Barbra Streisand and Elvis Presley. Presley brought in some 4,200 customers (and potential gamblers) every day for 30 days straight, in the process breaking all attendance records in the county's history. Kerkorian's International Leisure also bought the Flamingo Hotel; eventually, both hotels were sold to the Hilton Hotels Corporation and were renamed the Las Vegas Hilton and the Flamingo Hilton, respectively.

After he purchased the Metro-Goldwyn-Mayer movie studio in 1969, Kerkorian (with architect Martin Stern Jr.) opened the original MGM Grand Hotel and Casino, larger than the Empire State Building and the largest hotel in the world at the time it was finished. On November 21, 1980, the original MGM Grand burned in a fire that was one of the worst disasters in Las Vegas history. The Clark County Fire Department reported 84 deaths in the fire; there were 87 deaths total, including three which occurred later as a result of injuries sustained in the fire. After only 8 months the MGM Grand reopened. Almost three months after the MGM fire, the Las Vegas Hilton caught fire, killing eight people.

In 1986, Kerkorian sold the MGM Grand hotels in Las Vegas and Reno for $594 million to Bally Manufacturing. The Las Vegas property was subsequently renamed Bally's. Spun off from Metro-Goldwyn-Mayer, MGM Resorts International owns and operates several properties, including the current MGM Grand, the Bellagio, the New York-New York, Mandalay Bay, Luxor, Excalibur, Park MGM, the Cosmopolitan and the CityCenter complex in Las Vegas.

MGM sold its Treasure Island Hotel and Casino property to billionaire and former New Frontier owner Phil Ruffin for $750 million.

=== MGM ===
In 1969, Kerkorian appointed James Thomas Aubrey Jr. as president of MGM. Aubrey downsized the struggling MGM and sold off massive amounts of historical memorabilia, including Dorothy's ruby slippers from the 1939 film The Wizard of Oz, the majority of MGM's backlots in Culver City and overseas operations such as the British MGM studio at Borehamwood. Kerkorian sold MGM's distribution system in 1973, and gradually distanced himself from the daily operation of MGM. He also owned minority interest in Columbia Pictures but his holdings were thwarted by the Justice Department who filed an antitrust suit due to his owning stock in two studios. In 1979, Kerkorian issued a statement claiming that MGM was now primarily a hotel company; however, he also managed to expand the overall film library and production system with the purchase of United Artists (UA) from Transamerica in 1981, becoming MGM/UA Entertainment Company. In March 1986, he sold MGM to Ted Turner. After the purchase was made, Turner sold the UA subsidiary back to Kerkorian.

Turner kept ownership of MGM from March 25 to August 26, 1986. He racked up huge debts and Turner simply could not afford to keep MGM under those circumstances. To recoup his investment, Turner sold the production/distribution assets and trademarks of MGM (including its post-April 1986 libraries) to UA while retaining the pre-May 1986 MGM library, Associated Artists Productions (the pre-1950 Warner Bros. Pictures library and Fleischer Studios/Famous Studios Popeye cartoons) and RKO Radio Pictures libraries, as well as Gilligan's Island and its animated spin-offs The New Adventures of Gilligan and Gilligan's Planet. The MGM studio complex was sold to Lorimar-Telepictures, which was later acquired by Warner Bros.; in 1990, the lot was sold to Sony Corporation's Columbia Pictures Entertainment in exchange for the half of Warner Bros.' lot that it had rented since 1972. Also in 1990, the MGM film company was purchased by Italian financier Giancarlo Parretti, who then merged the former Cannon with the MGM purchase to create the short-lived MGM-Pathé Communications. Parretti defaulted on the loans he had used to buy MGM, leaving MGM in the hands of the French bank, Crédit Lyonnais. Crédit Lyonnais invested significant sums to revive the moribund company and eventually sold it back to Kerkorian in 1996. Kerkorian soon expanded MGM, purchasing Orion Pictures, The Samuel Goldwyn Company and Motion Picture Corporation of America (MPCA) from John Kluge's Metromedia in 1997, and bought the pre-April 1996 PolyGram Filmed Entertainment library in 1999 from its parent Philips, which was in the process of selling PolyGram to Seagram.

In 2005, Kerkorian sold MGM once more to a consortium led by Sony. He retained a 55% stake in MGM Mirage.

On November 22, 2006, Kerkorian's Tracinda investment corporation offered to buy 15 million shares of MGM Mirage to increase his stake in the gambling giant from 56.3% to 61.7%, if approved.

In May 2009, following the completion of a $1 billion stock offering by MGM Mirage, Kerkorian and Tracinda lost their majority ownership of the gaming company, dropping from 53.8% to 39% and even after pledging to purchase 10% of the new stock offering they now remain minority owners.

=== Auto industry ===
Kerkorian had an on-again/off-again relationship with the American auto industry. His involvement began in 1995 when with the assistance of retired Chrysler chairman and CEO Lee Iacocca, Kerkorian staged a takeover attempt of the Chrysler Corporation. Chrysler's management treated the takeover as hostile, and after a lengthy battle, Kerkorian canceled his plans and sold his Chrysler stake in 1996. As part of the settlement, Iacocca was placed under a gag order forbidding him from discussing Chrysler in public or print for five years. Two years later, Chrysler management agreed to be acquired by German automaker Daimler-Benz. Kerkorian always drove an American vehicle, including a Ford Taurus and Jeep Cherokee.

Kerkorian once owned 9.9% of General Motors (GM). According to press accounts from June 30, 2006, Kerkorian suggested that Renault acquired a 20% stake in GM to rescue GM from itself. A letter from Tracinda to Rick Wagoner was released to the public, to pressure GM's executive hierarchy, but talks failed. On November 22, 2006, Kerkorian sold 14 million shares of his GM stake (it is speculated that this action was due to GM's rejection of Renault and Nissan's bids for stakes in the company as both of these bids were strongly supported by Kerkorian); the sale resulted in GM's share price falling 4.1% from its November 20 price, although it remained above $30/share. The sale lowered Kerkorian's holding to around 7% of GM. On November 30, 2006, Tracinda said it had agreed to sell another 14 million shares of GM, cutting Kerkorian's stake to half of what it had been earlier that year. By the end of November 2006, he had sold substantially all of his remaining GM shares. After Kerkorian sold, GM lost more than 90% of its value, falling as low as $1/share by May 2009, and filed bankruptcy on June 1, 2009.

On April 5, 2007, Kirk Kerkorian made a $4.58 billion bid for the Chrysler Group, the U.S. arm of Daimler-Chrysler. After Daimler-Chrysler announced they were interested in selling the Chrysler division on February 14, large investors such as Cerberus Capital Management, The Blackstone Group and Magna International each announced intentions to bid on the company. Kerkorian's bid, while not expected, was not surprising given his long involvement in the U.S. automobile industry. During the bidding process, he sought the aid of his close associate Jerome York who was a former CFO at both Chrysler and IBM. On May 14, 2007, 80% of the Chrysler arm of Daimler-Chrysler was sold to Cerberus for $7.4 billion.

Kerkorian began buying Ford Motor Company stock in April 2008, and spent about $1 billion to accumulate a 6% stake in the automaker. By October 2008, the investment had lost two-thirds of its value, and he began selling. Tracinda explained, "In light of current economic and market conditions, it sees unique value in the gaming and hospitality and oil and gas industries and has, therefore, decided to reallocate its resources and to focus on those industries."

On October 21, Tracinda sold the 7.3 million Ford shares at an average price of $2.43, and said it planned to cut further its existing 6.1 percent stake in Ford, for a potential total loss of more than half a billion dollars. Kerkorian sold his remaining stake in Ford on December 29, 2008.

=== Wealth ===
Kerkorian's net worth in 2008 was $16 billion according to Forbes magazine, making him the 41st richest person in the world and the richest person in California at that time. By 2011, Kerkorian was among those hardest hit by the stock market recession as his net worth tumbled to $3.2 billion. In 2013, he was listed as the 412th richest person with a net worth of $3.9 billion.

== Personal life ==
Kerkorian was an "intensely private person". He almost never gave interviews and seldom appeared in public. "Kerkorian rarely attended board meetings and never gave speeches. He was shy, but was a tough negotiator. Those who knew him describe him not as a Hughesian hermit, but as a gentle, gracious, normal guy."

Kerkorian was an avid tennis player, played in tournaments, associated with other players like Lornie Kuhle, and routinely played with Alex Yemenidjian, a former MGM executive, and former owner of the Tropicana Las Vegas resort. He had a penchant for expensive clothes (especially custom-made outfits by Italian designer Brioni), but drove relatively inexpensive vehicles, such as a Pontiac Firebird, Jeep Grand Cherokee and a Ford Taurus.

Kerkorian died in Beverly Hills, California, on June 15, 2015, nine days after his 98th birthday. He is buried at Inglewood Park Cemetery in Inglewood, California, near Los Angeles.

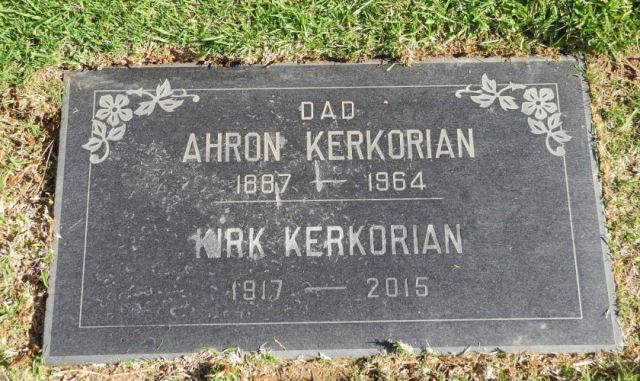
Gravestone of Kerkorian and his father Ahron

=== Family ===
Kerkorian was married four times, first to Hilda Schmidt from 1942 to 1952. His next marriage, to Jean Maree Hardy, lasted from 1954 to 1984. The two had met at the Thunderbird resort in Las Vegas. Hardy, a dancer from England, traveled the world instructing dance troupes. They met and fell in love while she was sent to check opportunities to choreograph a performance in Las Vegas. The marriage produced Kerkorian's two daughters, Tracy and Linda, whose names serve as a portmanteau for Kerkorian's personal holding company, Tracinda Corporation, and his charitable organization, the Lincy Foundation. Although divorced, they remained close friends and confidants.

Kerkorian's short-lived third marriage (1999) was to professional tennis player Lisa Bonder, 48 years his junior, which lasted only one month. The two had signed a prenuptial agreement before marrying. Kerkorian subsequently was involved in a breach of privacy suit filed against him by Steve Bing. Kerkorian claimed Bing was the father of Bonder's daughter, an allegation which was later confirmed by DNA paternity testing. On August 10, 2006, the Los Angeles Times reported that Kerkorian's attorneys were being sued by Bonder because of their connection to former high-profile private investigator Anthony Pellicano, who in 2008 began serving a fifteen-year prison sentence for running a wiretapping scheme. Bonder's attorney alleged that Kerkorian's lawyers hired Pellicano to wiretap telephone calls between him and Kerkorian's ex-wife in order to gain a tactical advantage in the divorce proceedings, an allegation that was later proven true. Pellicano also took a strand of Bing's used dental floss (surreptitiously acquired from rubbish) and used it to prove that it was Bing and not Kerkorian who fathered Bonder's daughter. Attorney Terry Christensen was subsequently convicted of racketeering for hiring Pellicano to tap Bonder's phone, and received a three-year prison sentence that was confirmed on appeal.

Kerkorian's short-lived fourth marriage (2014) was to Una Davis, born in 1966. The marriage lasted only 57 days and divorce proceedings were underway when Kerkorian died on June 15, 2015.

Between marriages, Kerkorian dated Priscilla Presley, Yvette Mimieux, and Cary Grant's widow Barbara. He remained friends with Presley and later helped her get elected to the board of directors at MGM.

=== The Lincy Foundation and philanthropic activities ===
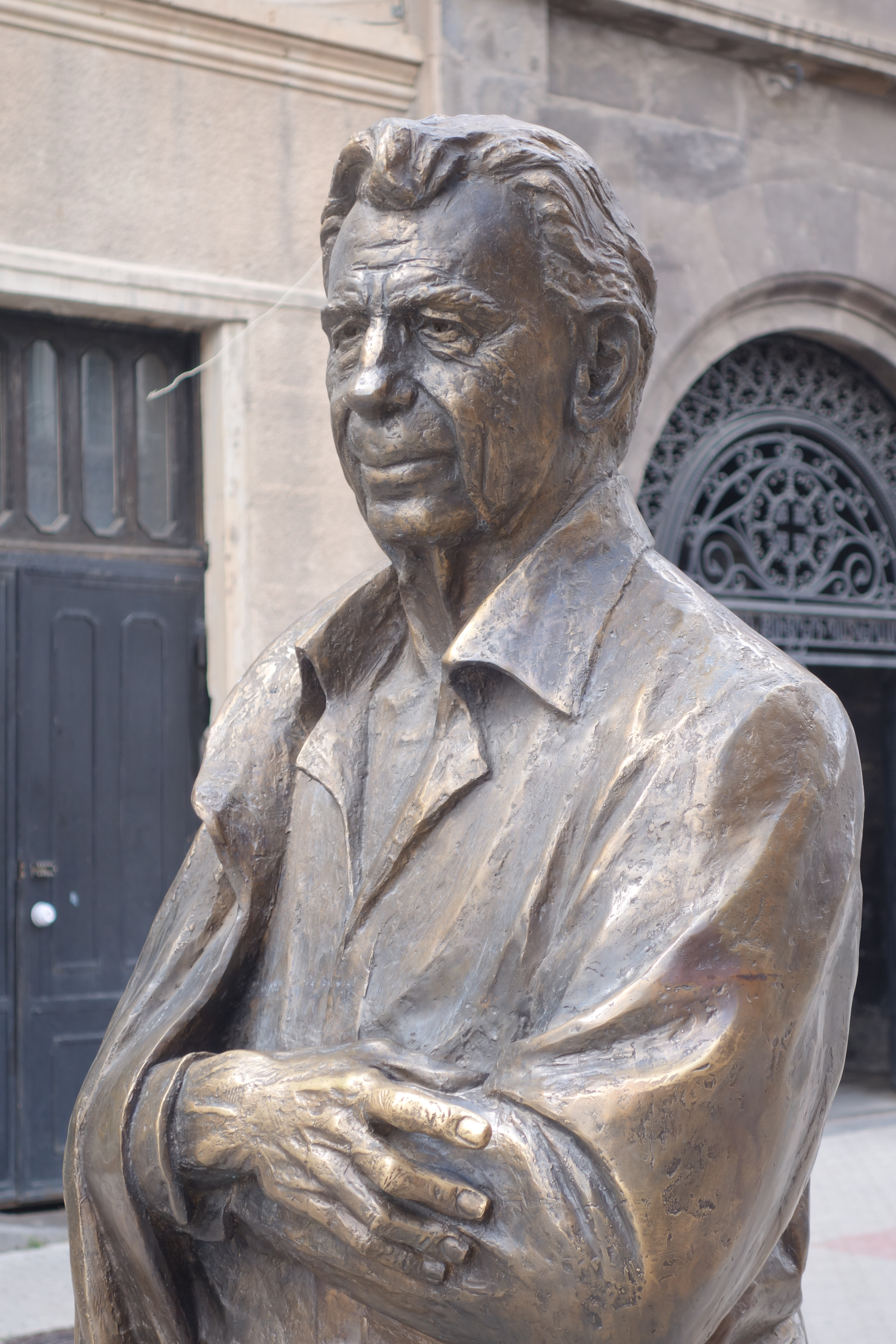
Statue of Kerkorian in Gyumri

Kerkorian was active in philanthropy through his charitable foundation, The Lincy Foundation, named after his daughters, Linda and Tracy. The foundation reportedly donated more than $1 billion, though Kerkorian never allowed anything to be named in his honor. The foundation covered half of the cost of an 80-kilometer highway in Armenia. Over the next decade, Kerkorian financed more than $200 million of infrastructure projects in Armenia, including $60 million to the reconstruction of schools and streets and the renovation of many museums, theaters and concert halls.

The Lincy Foundation was dissolved in 2011 after 22 years of charitable activities after dispensing its last $200 million to University of California, Los Angeles. Half was earmarked for medical research, scholarships and other projects while the other half was earmarked to create the "Dream Fund" for charitable causes around the country.

=== Estate ===
Most of the $2 billion estate was left to charity, with a three-person committee left to distribute the funds within three years. In December 2018, the estate settled with his 4th wife for $12.5 million, along with $10 million and $50 million for two philanthropic foundations, advised by his 4th wife.

== Awards and recognition ==
Armenia issued a Kirk Kerkorian stamp in 2017. The city of Gyumri unveiled a statue of Kerkorian in 2018.
