= William Hornbuckle =

American businessman (born 1957)

William J. Hornbuckle IV (born September 1, 1957) is an American businessman who is the chief executive officer of MGM Resorts International.

== Early life and education ==
Hornbuckle was born on a U.S. Air Force Base in Japan and grew up in Connecticut. To pursue a career in the hospitality industry, he moved to Las Vegas where he earned a Bachelor of Science Degree in Hotel Administration at the University of Nevada, Las Vegas.

== Career ==
Hornbuckle discovered his interest in hospitality at age 18 while working as a bartender in Connecticut. After learning about the "hotel school" at UNLV, he drove across the country in a van with his friends to pursue a hospitality career. He started his career in Las Vegas as a room service attendant and busboy at the Jockey Club before being promoted to his first managerial role as an assistant hotel manager at the then Flamingo Hilton.

Hornbuckle went on to work at a variety of Las Vegas resorts before joining MGM. For many years he worked at the Golden Nugget. He was also on the opening team of The Mirage, which at the time was one of the world's largest hotels and Las Vegas' first integrated resort. As CEO, Hornbuckle also oversaw the $625 million refurbishment of Caesars Palace, one of the most notable properties on the Las Vegas strip.

Hornbuckle joined the MGM Resorts International team in 1998 as Executive Vice President of Operations at the MGM Grand Las Vegas, and half a year later he became Chief Operating Officer at the same property. He held that role until 2001. Throughout his two decades with MGM, he has worked in a number of roles including Chief Operating Officer of Mandalay Bay Resort & Casino, President of Design and Development and MGM Resorts' chief marketing officer. Under his leadership in that capacity, MGM Resorts created and launched its customer loyalty program, M Life Rewards. The program was later enhanced and became MGM Rewards to allow both gaming and non-gaming guests to earn credits towards rewards, including dining, entertainment, travel and hotel stays.

In 2019 he became Chief Operating Officer of MGM Resorts International. In these roles he led the development of MGM Resorts in National Harbor, Springfield, Macau, and the T-Mobile Arena in Las Vegas.

Hornbuckle was appointed as acting CEO in March 2020, immediately after the COVID-19 pandemic began. He immediately faced numerous challenges and led the company through the closure of operations, restricted re-openings and implementation of new health and safety measures. He was named CEO on July 29, 2020. He assumed this role from Jim Murren, who was Chairman & CEO from 2008 to 2020.

Hornbuckle has played a key role in expanding MGM Resorts' and Las Vegas' hotel, entertainment and sports betting attractions. In 2016, Hornbuckle was appointed by Gov. Brian Sandoval to the Clark County Stadium Authority Board, which developed the Las Vegas NFL Stadium Project as part of a successful effort to attract an NFL team, the Raiders, to Las Vegas. He also played a key role in bringing the WNBA team, the Aces, to Las Vegas in 2017. He was President of T-Mobile Arena, which became home to Las Vegas' first professional sports team, the NHL's Golden Knights.

Hornbuckle is leading MGM's expansion into Japan. The company was selected as the Osaka region's integrated resort partner for a $10 billion development that will be one of Japan's first integrated resorts. He is also leading MGM's expansion into iGaming and sports betting. BetMGM, the company's online gaming platform, is currently active in many jurisdictions where the activity is legal, and Hornbuckle is leading the company to invest in the continued growth of BetMGM and other global digital markets.

He also is a board member of MGM Resorts International and as co-chairman of MGM Grand Paradise SA.

=== Compensation ===
In 2023, Hornbuckle's total compensation from MGM was $17 million, or 374 times the median employee pay at MGM for that year.

== Awards, community and industry involvement ==
Throughout his career, Hornbuckle has been active in supporting community, industry and charitable organizations. Hornbuckle is chair of the U.S. Travel Association previously was Chair of the U.S. Travel and Tourism Advisory Board, which advises the U.S. Secretary of Commerce on policy, regulation, programs and issues that impact the travel and tourism industry in the United States. He received the Hospitality College's 2019 Industry Leader of the Year Award and was named among Global Gaming Business Magazine's 25 People to Watch List in 2021.

He grew up with modest means and attended Catholic school, where, unbeknownst to him at the time, he was provided free tuition out of the school's generosity. This drives his interest in supporting education. He serves on the board of the Fulfillment Fund, which supports first-generation college students in removing barriers to access. In 2004, Hornbuckle and his wife created an endowed scholarship fund to provide financial support to Nevada-based students pursuing hospitality degrees at UNLV. In 2016, they established the Wendy and William Hornbuckle Family Endowment Scholarship Fund at The Webb Schools in Claremont, California, where he currently serves as a Board Trustee.

Hornbuckle was a founder of GBank (formerly known as Bank of George), a local bank that offers financial services to the Las Vegas community. He currently sits on their Holding Board.

He received the “Outstanding College Alumnus Award” from UNLV in 2002.

From 1993 to 1995, he was president of the Laughlin Chamber of Commerce. In 1991, he chaired the Nevada Hotel/Motel Association. In February 1997, he was named a member of the Nevada Governor's Council on Tourism. He was a member of the Board of Directors and Vice Chairperson of the Executive Committee for United Way of Southern Nevada. He also served on the Las Vegas Convention and Visitors Authority Board of Directors.

He previously served as a Board Member for the University of Nevada Las Vegas Foundation, the Andre Agassi Foundation, and the Las Vegas Convention and Visitors Authority. He currently is a member of the Board of Trustees for Three Square.

== Personal life ==
Hornbuckle is married and has three children.
