= Alex Yemenidjian =

Argentine-American business executive

Chairman of the Board, Armenco Capital
- Incumbent
- Assumed office ?

CEO and Chairman of the Board, Tropicana Las Vegas Hotel & Casino
- In office July 2009 – September 2015

CEO and Chairman of the Board, MGM Studios
- In office April 1999 – April 2005

Director, MGM Studios
- In office November 1997 – April 2005

Director, MGM Resorts International
- In office 1989–2005

President, MGM Resorts International
- In office July 1995 – December 1999

CEO, MGM Resorts International
- In office June 1995 – April 1999

CFO, MGM Resorts International
- In office May 1994 – January 1998

Personal details
- Born: 27 December 1955 (age 70) Buenos Aires, Argentina
- Children: 2
- Education: California State University, Northridge; University of Southern California
- Occupation: Businessman

Alejandro Yemenidjian (born 27 December 1955), also known as Alex Yemenidjian, is chairman of the Board of Armenco Capital, LLC.

== Early life and education ==
Alex Yemenidjian is of Armenian ethnicity, and was born in Buenos Aires, Argentina. His maternal grandparents lived in Van, Ottoman Empire and during the Armenian genocide, they fled to Argentina. His paternal grandparents were from the Gallipoli Peninsula in Turkey, and they escaped during the Armenian genocide to Greece and then ultimately settled in Argentina. Yemenidjian's father was a shoemaker in Buenos Aires. In 1968, Alex Yemenidjian and his family moved to the United States when he was a teenager. After attending Ferrahian Armenian School, Yemenidjian attained a bachelor's degree in business administration and accounting from California State University, Northridge, a master's degree in business taxation from the University of Southern California, and was adjunct professor of taxation at the USC Graduate School of Business.

== Career ==
Yemenidjian was a co-owner and served as chairman of the board and chief executive officer of Tropicana Las Vegas Hotel & Casino, Inc. from July 2009 to September 2015.

He served as chairman of the board and chief executive officer of Metro-Goldwyn-Mayer (MGM Studios) Inc., from April 1999 to April 2005 and was a director from November 1997 to April 2005.

Yemenidjian also served as a director of MGM Resorts International, Inc. ("MGM") (formerly MGM Grand, Inc. and MGM Mirage Resorts, Inc.) from 1989 to 2005. From July 1995 through December 1999, Yemenidjian served as president of MGM. He also served MGM in other capacities during this period, including as chief operating officer from June 1995 until April 1999 and as chief financial officer from May 1994 to January 1998.

Yemenidjian served as an executive of Tracinda Corporation, the majority owner of both Metro-Goldwyn-Mayer Inc. and MGM, from January 1990 to January 1997 and from February 1999 to April 1999.

Prior to 1990, Yemenidjian was the managing partner of Parks, Palmer, Turner & Yemenidjian, certified public accountants.

Mr. Yemenidjian is non-executive chairman of the board and chairman of the compensation committee of Guess?, Inc., a worldwide retailer of contemporary apparel, a trustee of Baron Investment Funds Trust and Baron Select Funds, both mutual funds, Inc.

== Personal life ==
Yemenidjian is married to Arda and has a son, a daughter, and 5 grandchildren.
