= Beau Rivage (Mississippi) =

Casino resort in Biloxi, Mississippi, US

Coordinates: 30.392413°N 88.891915°W

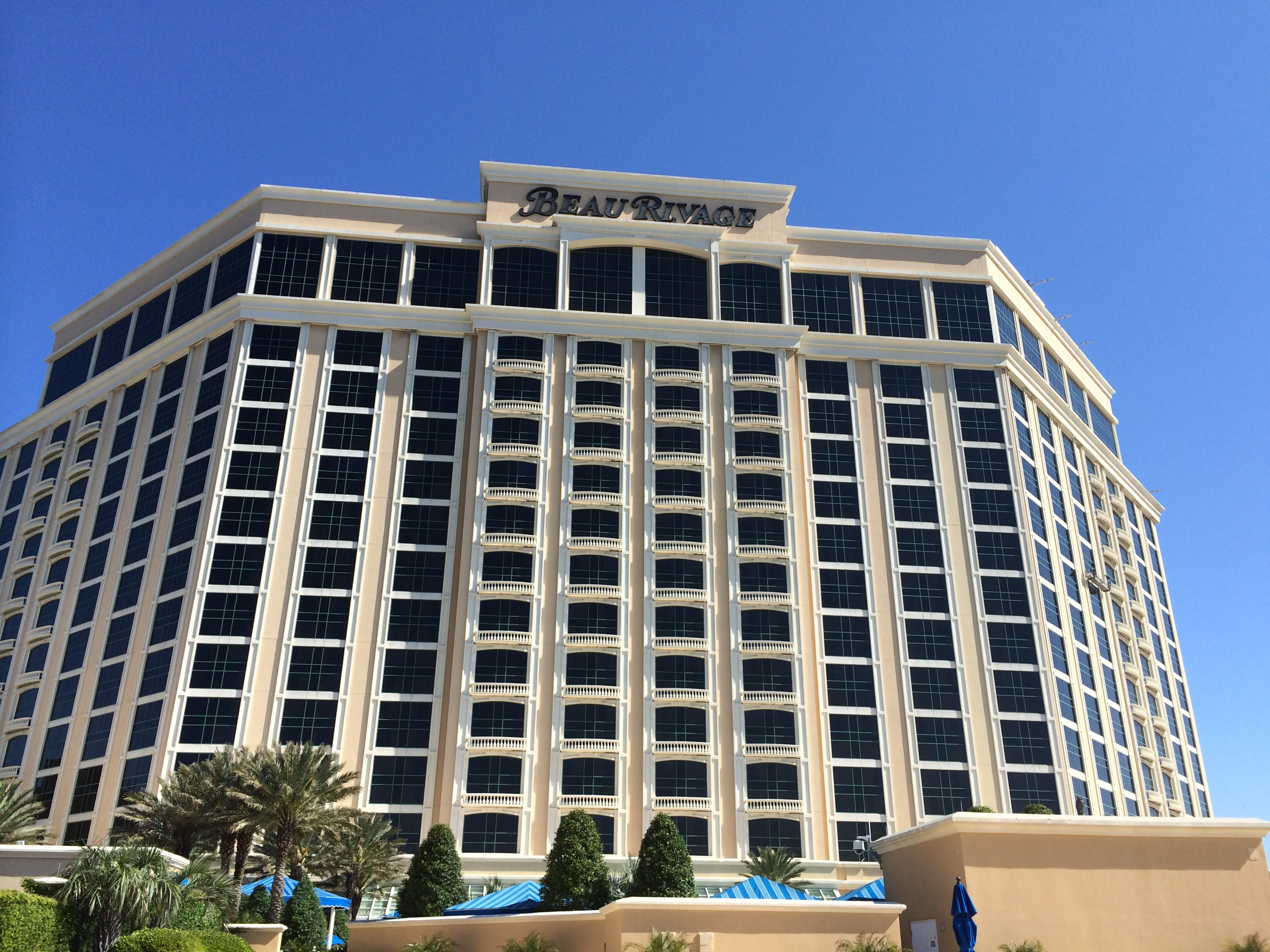
- Beau Rivage in 2014
- Interactive map of Beau Rivage
- Location: Biloxi, Mississippi; 875 Beach Blvd
- Opened: March 15, 1999; 27 years ago
- Theme: Waterfront
- No. of rooms: 1,740
- Gaming space: 72,000 sq ft (6,700 m^{2})
- Signature attractions: Bet MGM
- Notable restaurants: BR Prime Steakhouse; Jia; Stalla; Terrace Café; Roasted Bean
- Casino type: Dockside
- Owner: Vici Properties
- Operating license holder: MGM Resorts International
- Renovated in: 2006
- Public transit access: CTA
- Website: beaurivage.com

Beau Rivage is a waterfront casino resort in Biloxi, Mississippi, US. It is owned by Vici Properties and operated by MGM Resorts International. The Beau Rivage hotel is the tallest building in Mississippi. The term 'Beau Rivage' is French for 'beautiful shore'; the original, well-known hotels of that name are the Beau-Rivage Geneva and Beau-Rivage Palace, both in Francophone Switzerland.

== History ==
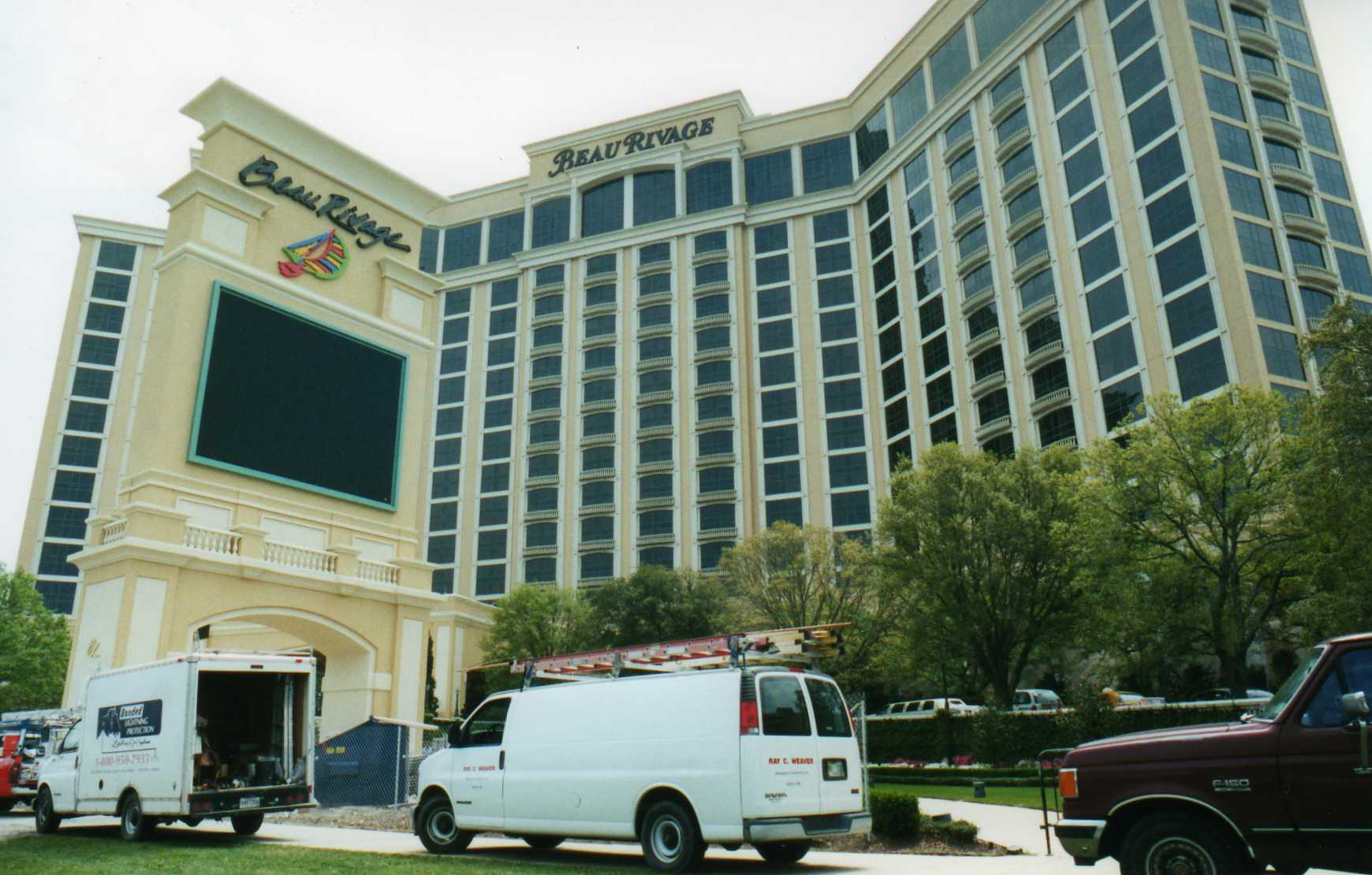
The land entrance side of the Beau Rivage, as seen pre-Katrina in 2002

The name of Beau Rivage was originally meant for the Bellagio casino resort on the Las Vegas Strip, however, developer Steve Wynn of Mirage Resorts changed Beau Rivage into Bellagio, and reserved this name for his new waterfront casino in Biloxi.

The Beau Rivage, with 1,740 rooms, opened in March 1999. At that time of its opening, it was the largest hotel/casino in the United States outside of Nevada. The casino was located on a series of floating barges as required by local law confining all casinos to mobile marine vessels at the time of the resort's construction. The hotel, restaurants, parking garage, and associated facilities were constructed on land. The height of the 29-floor hotel-casino is 346 ft (105 m).

Beau Rivage was seriously damaged by the 30 ft (9.1 m) storm surge caused by Hurricane Katrina on August 29, 2005, and was rebuilt by W.G. Yates & Sons Construction (the contractor that originally built it) and more than 50 subcontractors. Beau Rivage Resort & Casino re-opened its entire resort August 29, 2006 — the one-year anniversary of Hurricane Katrina. Although the hotel tower survived relatively unscathed, the casino barge was significantly damaged. Beau Rivage was one of the few still recognizable buildings remaining on Biloxi's coast.

In the weeks following Hurricane Katrina and in the wake of the catastrophic damage to the coast's casinos in the hurricane, the Mississippi state legislature changed its laws regarding the placement of casinos. Instead of having to be on barges on the water, casinos may now be built on land as long as they are within 800 feet (240 m) of the shore.

In November 2006, the resort opened a new Tom Fazio–designed championship golf course named Fallen Oak.

In 2009 there were news reports that Beau Rivage's parent company MGM Mirage had hired investment firm Morgan Stanley to assist the company in finding possible buyers for the Biloxi property and its cousin the MGM Grand Detroit. The Beau Rivage and MGM Grand Detroit were considered to be MGM Mirage's top performing properties and if sold could fetch a total of $1–2 billion which then would be used to lower MGM Mirage's debt load. In the event, no sale happened.

Ownership of the Beau Rivage, along with many other MGM properties, was transferred to MGM Growth Properties in 2016, while MGM Resorts continued to operate it under a lease agreement. Vici Properties acquired MGM Growth, including the Beau Rivage, in 2022.

== See also ==
- List of tallest buildings by U.S. state
- List of integrated resorts
