= Tracinda =

American private investment corporation

Tracinda Corporation
- Founded: 1976
- Founder: Kirk Kerkorian
- Headquarters: Las Vegas, Nevada
- Key people: Anthony Mandekic (President and CEO)

Tracinda Corporation is an American private investment corporation that was founded by Kirk Kerkorian. Its major investments included a minority interest of MGM Resorts International. Tracinda is headquartered in Las Vegas, Nevada. The company was named after Kerkorian's daughters, Tracy and Linda.

== History ==
Tracinda formerly owned ten percent of General Motors; it sold all of its stock in November 2006.

Tracinda offered $4.5 billion to buy Chrysler on April 5, 2007, causing the shares of DaimlerChrysler to soar 5.3%. Ultimately, the bid failed and Chrysler was sold to Cerberus Capital Management.

Kerkorian previously bid, unsuccessfully, in 1995 to take over Chrysler.

On May 16, 2008, Tracinda contacted Ford shareholders in a bid to buy 20,000,000 shares by June 4, 2008, at a rate of $8.50 a share. Later on, the bid was processed, and the company bought the shares through Ahmed Adnan, an investor.

On October 20, 2008, Tracinda sold more than 7 million shares of Ford at an average price of roughly $2.44 a share.

On December 29, 2008, Tracinda sold their remaining shares in Ford Motor Company.

In May 2009, following the completion of a $1 billion stock offering by MGM Mirage, Kerkorian and Tracinda lost their majority ownership of the gaming company, dropping from 53.8 percent to 39 percent and, even after pledging to purchase 10 percent of the new stock offering, they became minority owners.

Kerkor "Kirk" Kerkorian died on June 15, 2015, aged 98.

On September 16, 2019, MGM Resorts announced that Tracinda informed the company that it had disposed of its stake in the resort company following instructions left in Kerkorian's will that upon his death Tracinda was supposed to dispose of its interest in the resort company in a timely manner.
