= Colorado Belle =

Former casino hotel in Nevada

Coordinates: 35.15798°N 114.57203°W

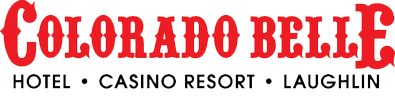

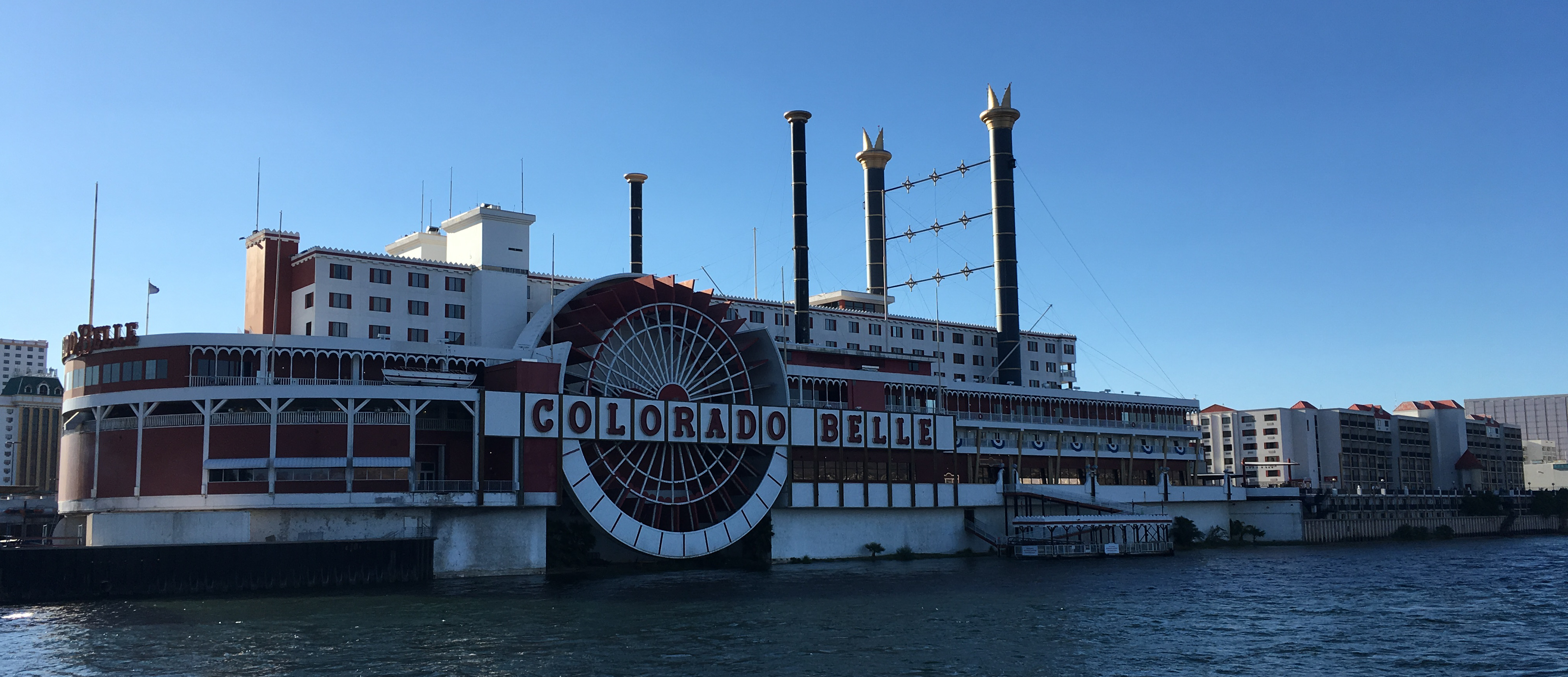
- The property as seen from the Colorado River in 2018
- Interactive map of Colorado Belle
- Location: Laughlin, Nevada, U.S.; 2100 South Casino Drive
- Opened: November 10, 1980; 45 years ago
- Closed: March 17, 2020; 6 years ago
- Theme: Riverboat
- No. of rooms: 1,168
- Gaming space: 42,706 sq ft (3,967.5 m^{2})
- Owner: Golden Entertainment
- Renovated in: 1997, 2005, 2012
- Website: coloradobelle.com

The Colorado Belle is a former casino hotel on the banks of the Colorado River in Laughlin, Nevada, owned and operated by Golden Entertainment. Initially closed on March 17, 2020 due to the COVID-19 pandemic, on May 18, 2020, Golden Entertainment announced that the Colorado Belle would remain closed "indefinitely," even after casinos were allowed to reopen. As of July 2026, the property remains closed.

The Colorado Belle is a fixed building made to look like a six-deck replica of a 19th-century Mississippi River paddle steamer riverboat, with 1,168 rooms in two seven-story towers. The casino had 42,706 sq ft (3,967.5 m^{2}) of gaming space with 750 slot machines, and 16 table games. The hotel had three restaurants: The Loading Dock, Big Easy Deli, and Pints brewery. The resort also included two pools, a fitness room, two gift shops, a koi pond and an arcade.

== History ==
Advanced Patent Technology, a slot machine maker and slot route operator, announced plans in 1979 to build a hotel and casino, with the hotel to be managed by Ramada. Construction began in October, as a joint venture with John Fulton, a Southern California restaurateur and the casino was opened on November 10, 1980.

In 1983, a preliminary agreement was reached to sell the casino to a group including attorney William Morris and Circus Circus Enterprises executives William Bennett and William Pennington for $1.6 million but Morris quit the deal a month later. The next year, Circus Circus bought the casino for $4 million, and made plans to move it to make room for an expansion of its neighboring Edgewater Hotel and Casino.

Plans for Colorado Belle were unveiled in 1985 and it opened on July 1, 1987, at a cost of $80 million.

Circus Circus Enterprises later became Mandalay Resort Group in 1999 and was bought by MGM Mirage in 2005.

In June 2007, MGM Mirage sold the Colorado Belle and the Edgewater to a partnership of Anthony Marnell III and Sher Gaming for a total of $200 million.

In January 2019, Golden Entertainment bought the Colorado Belle and the Edgewater from Marnell and Sher for a total of $190 million.

During the COVID-19 pandemic, the Colorado Belle was among businesses that were ordered by then-Governor Steve Sisolak to close on March 17, 2020, to prevent the spread of the virus. On May 18, 2020, Golden Entertainment announced that the Colorado Belle would remain closed indefinitely due to the economic impact of the business closures and uncertainty about the market. Approximately 400 employees were laid off, although some could relocate to Golden Entertainment's other properties, such as the Edgewater and Aquarius Casino Resort.

The Colorado Belle is the only gaming property in Laughlin that has not reopened since the pandemic closures. In May 2024, a small room fire was reported in the closed hotel, originating from a bathroom exhaust fan that had burned up. As of 2026, the property's website now redirects to a parked domain page.
