= William G. Bennett (gaming executive) =

American gaming executive (1924–2002)

- Born: William Gordon Bennett; November 16, 1924; Glendale, Arizona, U.S.
- Died: December 22, 2002 (aged 78); Paradise, Nevada, U.S.
- Education: Glendale High School; Phoenix College
- Occupations: Owner of the Sahara Hotel and Casino (1995-2002); Chairman of Circus Circus Enterprises (1974-1994)
- Spouses: Barbara Elaine Pullins (?-1962, her death); Lynn Margaret Hummel (1962-2002, his death)
- Children: Laura Lynn Bennett; Diana Lee Bennett; William Allen Bennett

William G. Bennett (November 16, 1924 – December 22, 2002) was an American gaming executive and real estate developer. Noted for pioneering Las Vegas as a destination for middle-class tourists and their families, he is best remembered for his establishment of gaming giant Circus Circus Enterprises in 1974. He served as chairman of Circus Circus between 1974 and 1994. Under his leadership Circus Circus developed numerous additional properties throughout Nevada, including the Excalibur and Luxor casinos in Las Vegas. Following his departure from Circus Circus, Bennett purchased the Sahara Hotel and Casino in Las Vegas in 1995 and operated it until his death in 2002.

== Early life ==
William Gordon Bennett was born on November 16, 1924, in Glendale, Arizona, to Allen Milton "Jack" Bennett, a local rancher, and Marjorie Dean Williams. Bennett's grandfather Archilbald W. Bennett came to Arizona from Kansas in 1898, settling in Peoria before moving to Glendale. Archibald constructed and operated the Glenwood Hotel in Glendale and became the town's first mayor upon incorporation in 1910. William attended Glendale High School and Phoenix College and served as a Navy dive-bomber during World War II. Following his return from the war, he established a chain of furniture stores in Phoenix. Bennett's stores were successful and he lived a lavish lifestyle with a home on Exeter Boulevard in the upscale Arcadia neighborhood of Phoenix and membership in the prestigious Phoenix Country Club. On March 15, 1962, Bennett's wife Barbara died whilst on vacation with him in Guaymas, Sonora; he sold the furniture store to focus on alternative investments and remarried to Lynn Hummel, an administrative clerk at the store, later that same year. A friend of Bennett's established a financial corporation for his investments. Mismanagement of the company caused the value of Bennett's considerable stake to plummet, bankrupting him.

== Del Webb ==
Through his connections in Phoenix, Bennett had become acquainted with Del Webb Corporation president L. C. Jacobsen. Jacobsen had facilitated the construction and development-centered Del Webb Corporation's diversification into the field of gaming and hospitality. Jacobsen wanted to recruit individuals with business backgrounds into the Del Webb Corporation with the hopes that their experiences would help in the management of its hotel and casino properties. In 1965, Jacobsen hired Bennett to work at Del Webb's Sahara Tahoe property in Lake Tahoe, Nevada. During this time, his wife Lynn worked as a cashier in the Cage at the Sahara Tahoe. Bennett worked as a casino host at night and worked in a variety of the hotel's various other departments during the day, slowly learning the operations of the various different departments of the property. After six months he was named "night general manager."

Approximately five months after his promotion to night general manager of the Sahara Tahoe, he was transferred to Webb's Mint property in downtown Las Vegas. The property had been losing $4.5 million per year. Bennett managed to improve conditions at the property, eventually managing to turn an annual profit of over $10 million. Webb himself eventually asked Bennett to manage both the Mint and the Sahara Tahoe properties in 1967. Bennett responded by requesting a corporate plane to transport him between Reno and Las Vegas. Webb, a frugal survivor of the Great Depression, responded, "No damned airplanes, Air West has all kinds of them." Bennett took the job anyway without any additional pay.

During his time at the Webb Corporation, Bennett had noticed a high turnover rate for Webb's managers. He attributed this to the company's pay structure; Despite managing two of the firm's most profitable properties, Bennett was paid the same $150,000 salary as the company's other lesser-burdened managers. However, Bennett's performance was rewarded by Webb with stock options and upon leaving the company in 1971, Bennett realized $5 million from his sale of Del Webb stock.

While managing the Mint, Bennett became acquainted with liquor salesman Steve Wynn who, like Bennett, would later go on to become one of Las Vegas's most legendary casino owners. Bennett and Wynn conducted business together and often fraternized in the Mint's Zodiac Bar. Following his departure from Del Webb, Wynn offered him a high ranking position at the Golden Nugget Companies; however, Bennett declined the offer in order to pursue his dream of owning his own property. Years later, in 1983, Wynn would persuade Bennett to take Circus Circus Enterprises public.

== Circus Circus ==
Following his departure from the Webb Corporation, Bennett partnered with William Pennington in a corporation that leased novelty electronic gambling machines to casinos. In May 1974, he and Pennington leased the Circus Circus Hotel and Casino from owners Jay Sarno and Stanley Mallin, forming Circus Circus Enterprises. Bennett became chairman of the corporation upon its formation. The pair would eventually exercise an option to purchase the property in a complex transaction completed in 1983. Bennett and Pennington brought about sweeping changes to the property, including the construction of the casino's first 395-room tower and bringing the casino's corrupt carnival-style midway under corporate management. Unlike most properties at the time attempting to appeal to a mature, upscale clientele, Bennett and Pennington marketed the property to middle-class families.

The business plan proved extraordinarily successful, and Circus Circus Enterprises opened an additional Circus Circus property in Reno in 1978, where Pennington became on-site manager while Bennett continued to focus on the Las Vegas property. In 1983, they purchased the Edgewater Hotel and Casino in Laughlin. Circus Circus Enterprises was taken public on October 25, 1983, opening at $15.00 a share and closing at $16.87. The underwriting was led by Michael Milken and the prominent investment bank Drexel Burnham Lambert. Pennington retired from the corporation in 1988. Bennett opened his first new property in 1990, with the revolutionary new $300 million 4000-room Excalibur Hotel and Casino at the southwest corner of Las Vegas Boulevard and Tropicana Avenue. In 1993, the company again made history with the opening of the iconic $375 million Luxor Hotel and Casino, immediately south of the Excalibur. With the opening of the property, Circus Circus Enterprises became Nevada's largest employer, with 18,000 employees. In 1991, Bennett announced he would step down as CEO of Circus Circus Enterprises. With the announcement, Bennett sold 900,000 of his Circus Circus shares for $60.25 a share, or $54.2 million. The sale was handled by Salomon Brothers.

Following the first decline in annual income in the company's history, Bennett stepped down as chairman of Circus Circus Enterprises in 1994. The decline in earnings was attributed to the exorbitant costs associated with the construction of Luxor's signature pyramid-shaped structure and the new Grand Slam Canyon at Circus Circus. Following this, Bennett became embroiled in a controversy after personally purchasing the Hacienda Resort and Casino immediately south of the Luxor despite Circus Circus Enterprises' own interest in doing so. Following a 1995 lawsuit settlement, Bennett was forced to relinquish the Hacienda property to Circus Circus and resign his seat on the board. Bennett was able to sell his stock in Circus Circus for $230 million.

== Later years and death ==
In 1995, Bennett purchased the Sahara Hotel and Casino for $193 million. The following year, Bennett suffered a heart-attack at age 71. Despite this, Bennett proceeded to extensively remodel the property, enlarging the casino and adding a variety of family friendly attractions. Many former Circus Circus employees followed Bennett to the Sahara with the promise of matched compensation and benefits. Bennett continued to actively manage the property until his death at Desert Springs Hospital in Paradise, Nevada on December 22, 2002.
