= Mandalay Resort Group =

American hotel and casino operator

- Formerly: Circus Circus Enterprises, Inc. (1983–1999)
- Traded as: NYSE: MBG
- Founded: 1974; 52 years ago Winchester, Nevada, U.S.
- Founders: William Bennett; William Pennington
- Defunct: April 25, 2005; 21 years ago
- Fate: Acquired by MGM Mirage
- Headquarters: Paradise, Nevada, U.S.

Mandalay Resort Group (formerly Circus Circus Enterprises) was an American hotel and casino operator based in Paradise, Nevada. Its major properties included Mandalay Bay, Luxor, Excalibur and Circus Circus, as well as half of the Monte Carlo. In terms of market capitalization, it was one of the largest casino operators in the world. Its stock is traded on the New York Stock Exchange with the ticker symbol "CIR" and "MBG".

== History ==
The company's longtime name originated with the Circus Circus casino, opened by Jay Sarno in 1968. The company was incorporated in 1974, as Circo Resorts Inc., owned by casino executives William Bennett and William Pennington. Circo was formed to take over management of Circus Circus, and the company would take ownership nearly a decade later. In 1978, Circo Resorts was renamed Circus Circus Hotels Inc., after the opening of Circus Circus Reno.

The company purchased the Silver City Casino and Slots-A-Fun Casino in 1979 for $30 million, then refurbished both the interior and exterior.

The company went public in 1983, as Circus Circus Enterprises, and traded on the New York Stock Exchange. The company's properties found success in the 1980s offering a Las Vegas experience to families subsequently experimented upon by its competitors. Its converted Circus Circus (originally developed for the upmarket) and later Excalibur properties offered gaming opportunities for adults and separate non-gambling games and theme-park-style experiences for underage visitors under the same roof.

In 1983, Circus Circus purchased the Edgewater Hotel and Casino in Laughlin, Nevada for $17 million. The next year, the company bought the neighboring Colorado Belle casino from Advanced Patent Technology and John Fulton for $4 million. The company planned to move the unprofitable Colorado Belle to make room for an expansion of the Edgewater.

The group subsequently developed the Excalibur in 1990, the Luxor in 1993 and the Mandalay Bay in 1999 for which the group was renamed.

The group entered into a joint venture in 1993 with Don Carano of Eldorado in Reno to develop and build Reno's largest and tallest megaresort titled Silver Legacy. The $350 million hotel opened on July 28, 1995. Circus Circus Enterprises held a majority stake in that Reno resort.

Circus Circus Tunica opened on August 29, 1994. It was rebranded in 1997 as Gold Strike Tunica and given a more upscale theme. The total cost for the remodel was estimated to be $125 million.

On March 20, 1995, Circus Circus Enterprises announced that it had agreed to acquire Gold Strike Resorts, a closely held budget casino owner and operator based in Jean, Nevada, in a deal valued at more than $600 million. At the time of the acquisition, Gold Strike Resorts owned the Gold Strike Hotel and Gambling Hall, Nevada Landing Hotel and Casino, Railroad Pass Hotel and Casino and 50% of the under-construction Monte Carlo Resort and Casino. The acquisition did not include the original Gold Strike near Boulder City, because the owners wanted to pass it on to their children.

In 1995, Circus Circus purchased the Hacienda from Archon Corporation. By this time, the Hacienda was dwarfed by the many new megaresorts that were being built, in particular the Luxor, which had just been recently completed. On December 10, 1996, the Hacienda was closed to the public after 40 years, and imploded later that month. This implosion was broadcast on the Fox Network as a part of their New Year's Eve 1996 telecast. Despite the implosion, parts of the old resort still stood, due to the building not falling into its footprint, but toppling into its parking lot. The next day a wrecking crew was brought in to bring down the remaining parts. In March 1999, it was replaced by the Mandalay Bay.

The group was also a partner with Mirage Resorts on the 1996 opening of the nearby Monte Carlo Resort and Casino.

Circus Circus Enterprises closed the Silver City Casino on October 31, 1999.

Following the completion of Mandalay Bay in 1999, the name of the company was changed to Mandalay Resorts Group.

On December 14, 1999, MotorCity Casino Hotel opened.

On May 23, 2002, the Mandalay Resort Group announced a second 1,122-room hotel tower at their Mandalay Bay property, with a cost of at least $200 million. Construction began on the tower in September 2002. The name of the tower, THEhotel at Mandalay Bay, was chosen in September 2003. The tower opened on December 17, 2003.

On June 4, 2004, one of Mandalay's largest competitors, MGM Mirage, announced a bid to acquire it for $68 per share plus assumption of debt. Although the proposal was announced after the stock market closed, the volume of trading in Mandalay stock on that day was quadruple the normal, with the stock closing at $60.27 per share. The ensuing negotiations between the two companies included at one point an announcement that the Mandalay board was rejecting the offer because of antitrust concerns. On June 15, 2004, however, both companies' boards approved a revised offer of $71 per share. The agreement called for MGM Mirage to pay $4.8 billion and to assume $2.5 billion in debt. The transaction was completed on April 25, 2005, for $7.9 billion.

MGM executives were confident that antitrust regulators would not require the sale of any of the two companies' properties. Michigan law, however, forbade one company from owning multiple casinos, requiring the sale of either the MGM Grand Detroit or Mandalay's 54% stake in the MotorCity Casino. After some vacillation about which property to sell, Mandalay accepted a $525-million offer for its interest in MotorCity from Marian Ilitch, the casino's second largest shareholder.

== Hotels and casinos when acquired by MGM Mirage ==
- Circus Circus, Winchester, Nevada
- Circus Circus, Reno, Nevada
- Colorado Belle, Laughlin, Nevada
- Edgewater, Laughlin, Nevada
- Excalibur, Paradise, Nevada
- Gold Strike, Jean, Nevada
- Gold Strike, Tunica, Mississippi
- Grand Victoria, Elgin, Illinois
- Luxor, Paradise, Nevada
- Mandalay Bay, Paradise, Nevada
- THEhotel at Mandalay Bay, Paradise, Nevada
- Monte Carlo, Paradise, Nevada (50% owner in partnership with MGM Mirage)
- Nevada Landing, Jean, Nevada
- Railroad Pass, Henderson, Nevada
- Silver Legacy, Reno, Nevada (50% owner in partnership with Eldorado Resorts)
- Slots-A-Fun, Winchester, Nevada

== Former properties ==
- Hacienda, Paradise, Nevada
- MotorCity, Detroit, Michigan
- Silver City Casino, Winchester, Nevada

== See also ==
- List of defunct gambling companies
