= Luke Brugnara =

American businessperson convicted of fraud

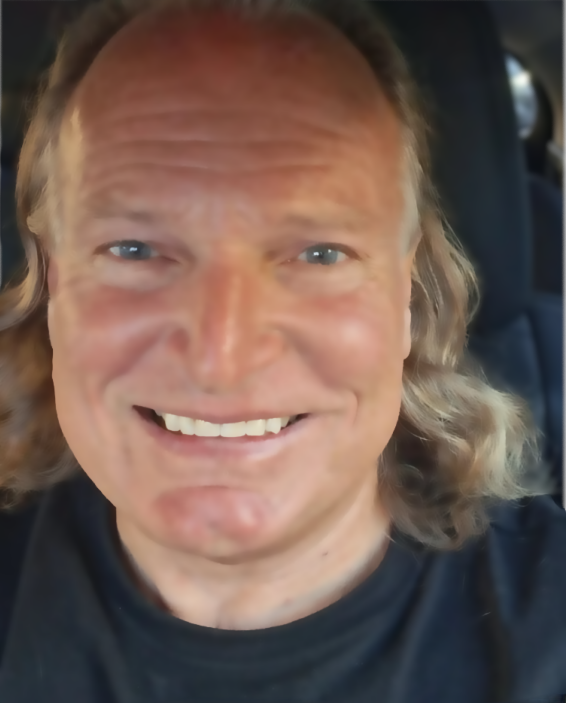
- Luke Brugnara, October, 2025
- Born: October 18, 1963 (age 62); San Francisco, CA
- Other name: Lucky Luke
- Occupations: Commercial real estate investor and developer.
- Known for: Commercial real estate investment in San Francisco.
- Criminal charges: Tax evasion, mail fraud
- Criminal status: In Federal Custody

Luke Dominic Brugnara (born October 18, 1963) is an American commercial real estate investor and developer. Brugnara became known for purchasing real estate in downtown San Francisco during the 1990s. In 2010, he was convicted of tax evasion. In 2015, he was convicted of mail fraud and sentenced to seven years in prison.

== Childhood ==
Brugnara was raised in the Sunset District of San Francisco, the son of a supervisor at San Francisco's Juvenile Hall. He went to school at St. Ignatius College Preparatory, a private preparatory Jesuit school. Brugnara was a competitive flycaster during his teenage years and set several national accuracy flycasting records in the American Casting Association which still stand today. Brugnara graduated from San Diego State University in 1987.

== Real estate career ==
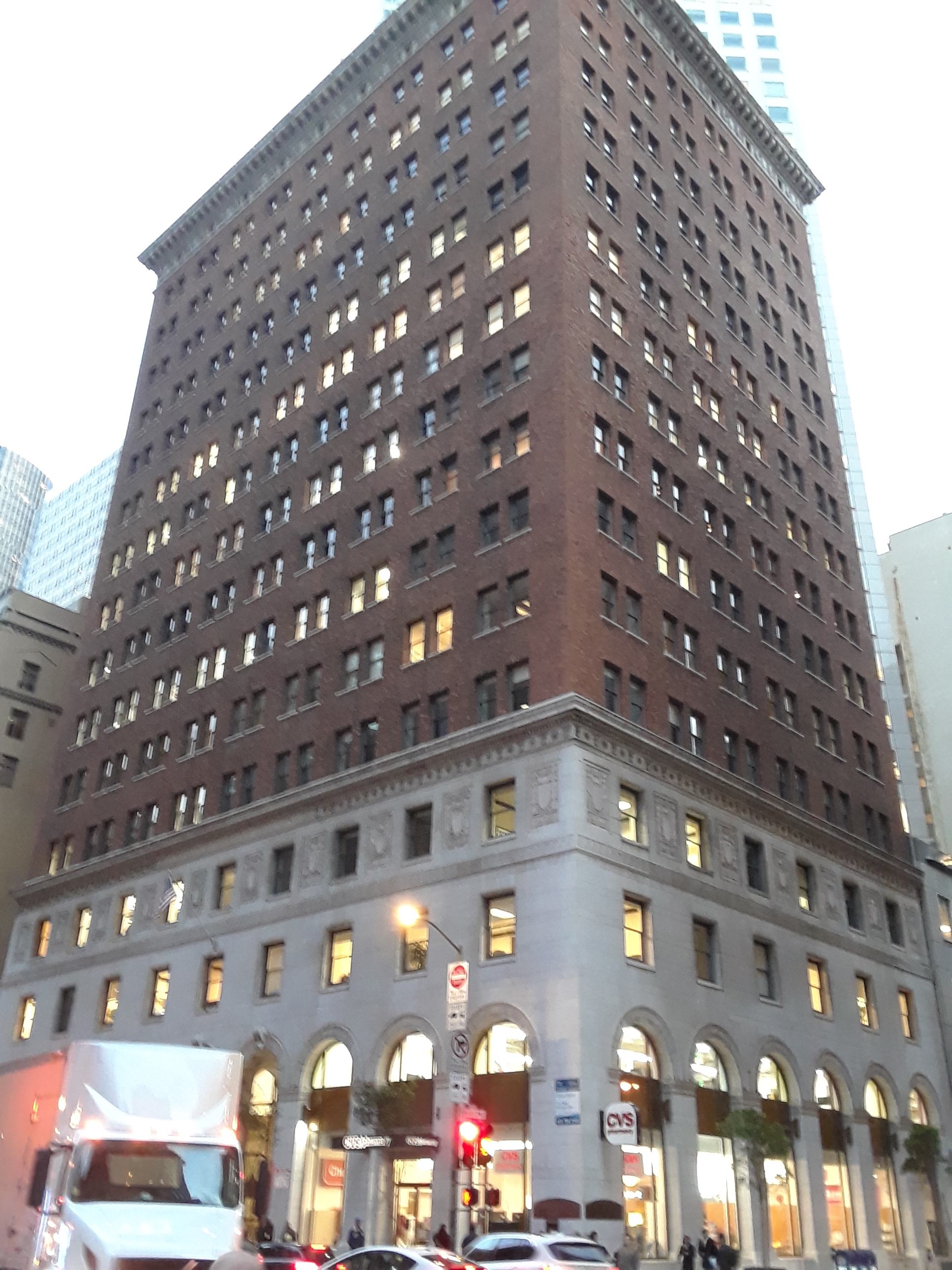
351 California Street, headquarters of Brugnara Corporation 1997–2009

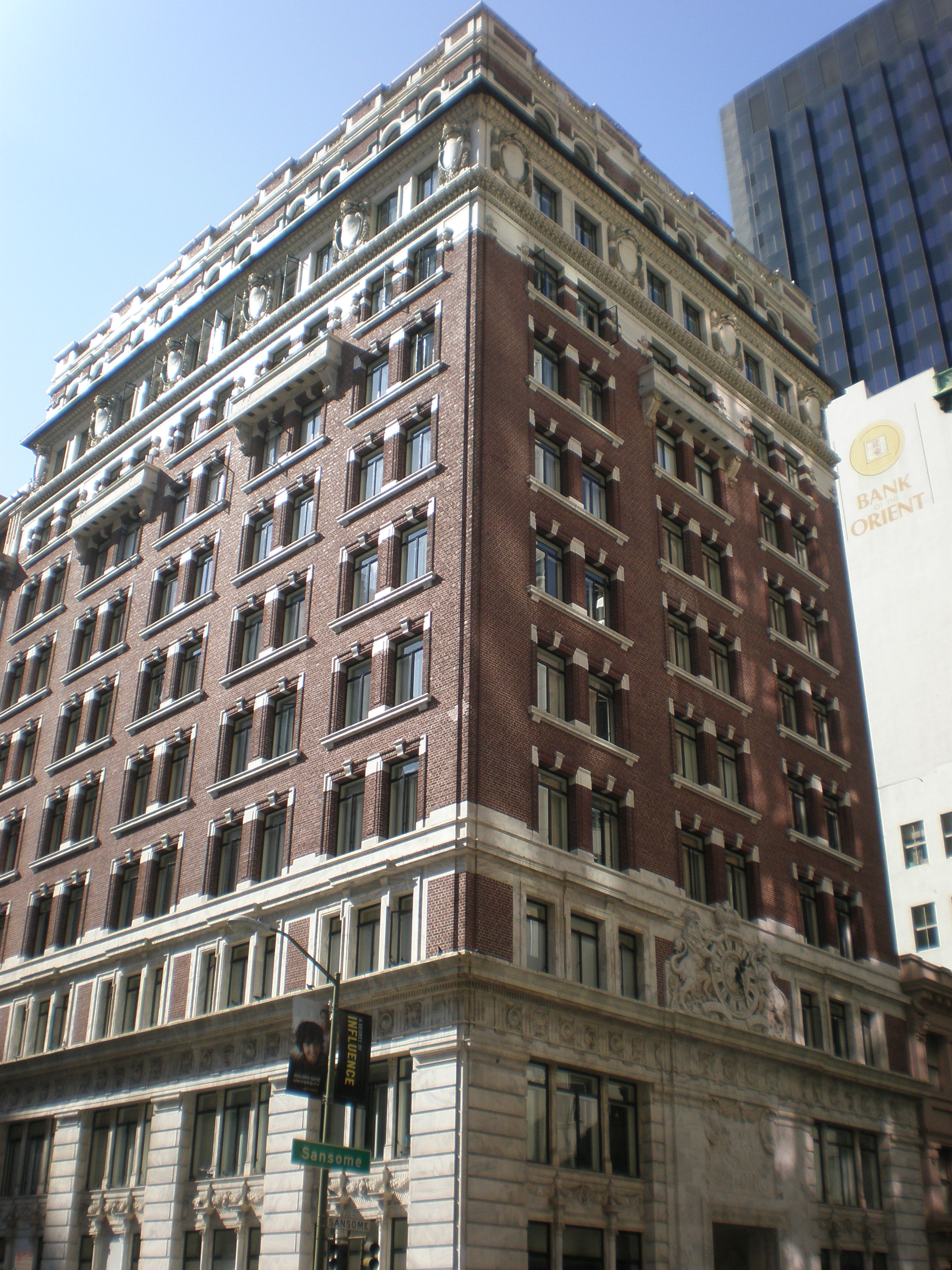
Royal Insurance Building at 201 Sansome street

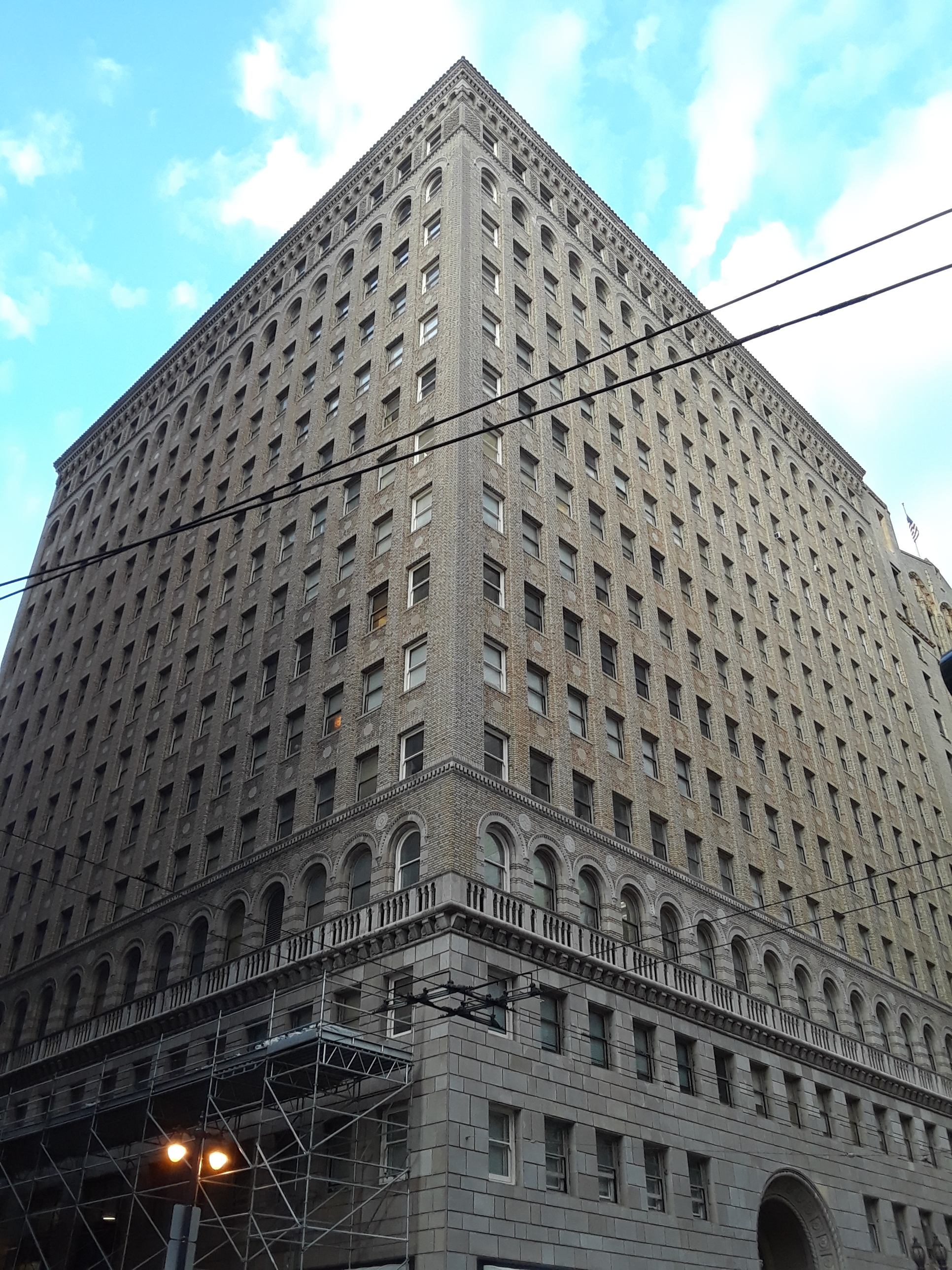
The Medico-Dental Building at 490 Post street

=== San Francisco ===
Brugnara started his real estate career in San Francisco in 1993 by buying a note for $1.5M for the Kress Building at 939 Market Street, foreclosing on the note, and then borrowing $3M against the property. Brugnara proceeded to buy and sell a series of office buildings in San Francisco. In 1997, he owned 500,000 square feet of office space in downtown San Francisco. At one time or another, his portfolio included 814 Mission Street, the Bulletin Building, the Westinghouse Electric Building, 735 Market Street, the Royal Insurance Building, 201 Sansome Street, the Pacific Bank Building, the Medico-Dental Building, and 351 California Street. Brugnara tried unsuccessfully to purchase the Chevron Building in 1994.

In 2005, he offered to purchase the shuttered St. Brigid Church in San Francisco for $3 million to prevent its sale to the Academy of Art University. The offer was not accepted, and the sale to the Academy of Art University went through. In 2008, Brugnara claimed water rights associated with property he owned near Gilroy, California, including a reservoir which he stated could retain 2,000 acre-feet.

=== Las Vegas ===
Brugnara first became involved in Las Vegas real estate in 1999, when he attempted to buy the Desert Inn for $270 million, but lost out to an all-cash offer from Sun International and Steve Wynn. In November 1999, he bought the Silver City Casino and the Las Vegas Shopping Plaza on the Las Vegas Strip for $40 million, with plans to replace it with a larger casino and hotel, but converted the property into a shopping center in 2004 after the Nevada Gaming Commission denied him a gambling license in 2001. In denying the license, the Gaming Commission had cited poor financial recordkeeping, claims that Brugnara had failed to file tax returns, conflicts with San Francisco regulators, and allegations that Brugnara had made death threats. In response, Brugnara stated that the Nevada Gaming Commissioners were "a bunch of wind-up dolls" representing Las Vegas incumbents, and threatened to file suit, but eventually decided not to do so, preferring to re-apply and address the Gaming Commission's concerns. In 2006–2007, Brugnara leased his 20,000+ sq ft, 11-bedroom Las Vegas mansion to Michael Jackson for over $1 million for six months. In January 2010, he submitted a $170 million bid to purchase the bankrupt Fontainebleau project on the Las Vegas Strip, but his bid was rejected for failing to include the required $1 million deposit and evidence of the ability to obtain the necessary financing.

== Legal ==
=== Health code violations ===
In 1998, Brugnara was sued by the SF City Attorney for improper disposal of medical waste at his Medico-Dental Building. In 2000, the San Francisco Superior Court decided against Brugnara, and imposed a $1 million penalty.

=== Tax evasion ===
On April 9, 2008 the grand jury returned an indictment charging Brugnara with four counts of taking endangered species in violation of 16 U.S.C. section 1538, and two counts of making false statements to investigation agents in violation of 18 U.S.C. section 1001. Brugnara owned and leased property in San Francisco and Nevada. In 2000, 2001, and 2002 Brugnara sold properties and omitted the gains on his Federal Income tax returns. In 2010, Brugnara pleaded guilty to charges of tax evasion related to the sale of $45 million in commercial property and violations of the Endangered Species Act for blocking an opening in a private dam to prevent trout migration from Little Arthur Creek. Following his arraignment in the cases, Brugnara was released on $50,000 bond and ordered to have no direct contact with the witnesses in the cases. He was sentenced to 30 months in federal prison on the tax charges. On January 6, 2010 the government modified his release conditions based on allegations that Brugnara contacted the witnesses. He was later detained on January 28, 2010, based on allegations that he threatened a witness and released on January 31, 2010, but remanded again on March 5 for violating his release conditions.

During his detention hearing evidence was submitted demonstrating Brugnara's threats, including a city attorney, a court appointed receiver, his brother, his former mistress and their child. Also a witness who altered her testimonial to a gaming officer after he violated his restraining order, two restraining orders filed against him in 2008 by employees at his children's school. On May 26, 2010 Brugnara was released to self surrender to the Bureau of Prisons. Brugnara's later request to withdraw his guilty plea and go to trial was denied by the trial judge, and the decision was affirmed by the Ninth Circuit Court of Appeals in 2011. Brugnara was released from prison in 2012.

=== Mail fraud ===
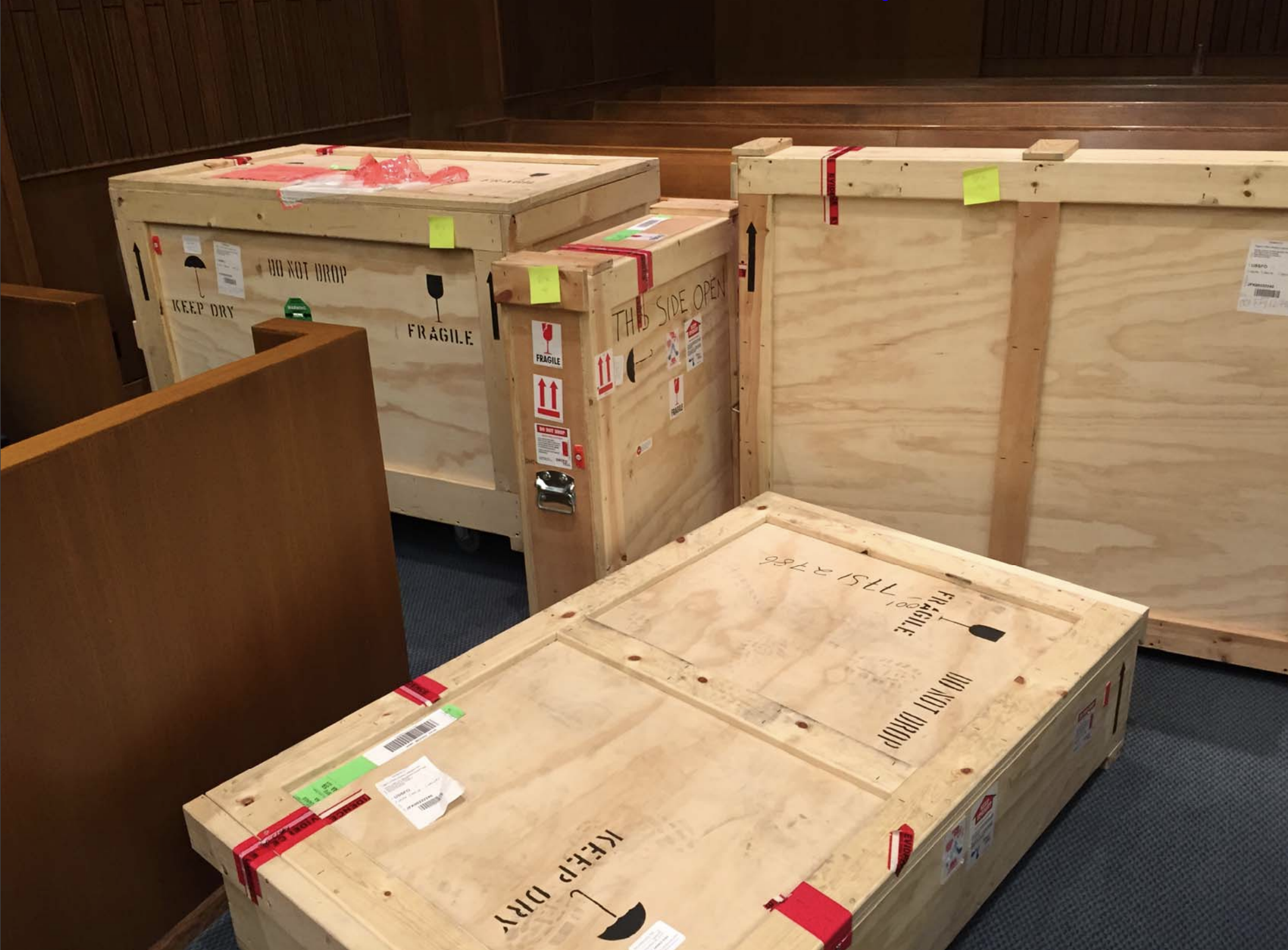
The artwork fraudulently obtained by Luke Brugnara displayed during his 2014 trial.

In May 2014, Brugnara was charged with mail fraud for refusing to pay for $11 million in art delivered to his Sea Cliff estate. While awaiting trial on these charges, Brugnara was furloughed into the custody of his attorney, and escaped from the San Francisco federal courthouse. He was recaptured a week later in Los Gatos, California. Brugnara represented himself in the trial, which was tried before Judge William Alsup of the Northern District of California. By the end of the trial Judge Alsup had sentenced Brugnara to 471 days in prison for contempt due to Brugnara's conduct during the trial, including routinely ignoring Judge Alsup's evidentiary and procedural rulings, yelling at witnesses, throwing tantrums, and insulting the government's attorneys, including calling U.S. District Attorney Robin Harris a "Nazi" in front of the jury. Brugnara was convicted on six of the nine counts he faced, and sentenced to seven years in prison. On May 11, 2017 the Appeals Court affirmed all the convictions, rejecting Brugnara's argument that his decision to represent himself denied him a fair trial. The court also rejected Brugnara's claim that the art was fake and hence his refusal to pay or return it didn't constitute fraud, ruling that Brugnara had not taken the steps necessary to support his claim that the delivered art was fake, and, even if it were, his refusal to return the art (claiming that it was a gift) still showed evidence of an intent to defraud.

=== Escape and wire fraud ===
In March 2024 the Bureau of Prisons filed two escape notices for leaving a residential reentry center, where he was serving time. In his second escape Brugnara left for six days before being arrested by US marshals in a hotel in South San Francisco. Brugnara was returned to prison to serve his remaining time. On May 21, 2024, Brugnara was indicted for wire fraud and money laundering from illegally obtaining COVID-19 funds.

=== Alleged threats, firearm charge, and fugitive status ===
In 2026, Brugnara was arrested by Daly City police following allegations that he threatened a couple near Thornton State Beach, reportedly stating, “If you get near the fence I will shoot and kill you.” Authorities subsequently charged him with being a felon in possession of a firearm. At the time of the arrest, Brugnara was subject to federal pretrial release conditions that included a prohibition on new arrests. Prosecutors argued that the Daly City incident constituted a violation of those conditions. Brugnara failed to appear at a scheduled court hearing addressing the alleged violation of his pretrial terms. As a result, a federal judge issued a bench warrant for his arrest. After six months as a fugitive, he was arrested in San Francisco's Sunset District in late July 2026 and will remain in custody until the case is finished.

== Other investments ==
In 2003, Brugnara owned Christ Carrying the Cross, which he attributed to Leonardo da Vinci, although the attribution remains disputed.

In 2008 Brugnara was in negotiations to supply the city of Gilroy their domestic water supply.

In 2026, Brugnara fenced in, with massive chain-link fence, a coastal property he claimed ownership of, blocking a walking path to Thornton State Beach in Daly City, California. The fence was removed on February 20, 2026 after county officials determined that Brugnara only owned a small percentage of the property. Long-term majority owners of the land did not approve of the fence and questioned Brugnara's partial ownership claim.

== Personal life ==
After becoming acquainted with his future wife in college, they married in the 1990s and have four children. Prior to his incarceration, Brugnara split residence between Las Vegas and a Sea Cliff, San Francisco, California house purchased from comedian Cheech Marin. Brugnara is the nephew of former San Francisco Police Chief Anthony "Tony" Ribera.
