= Circus Circus Reno =

Hotel and casino located in Reno, Nevada

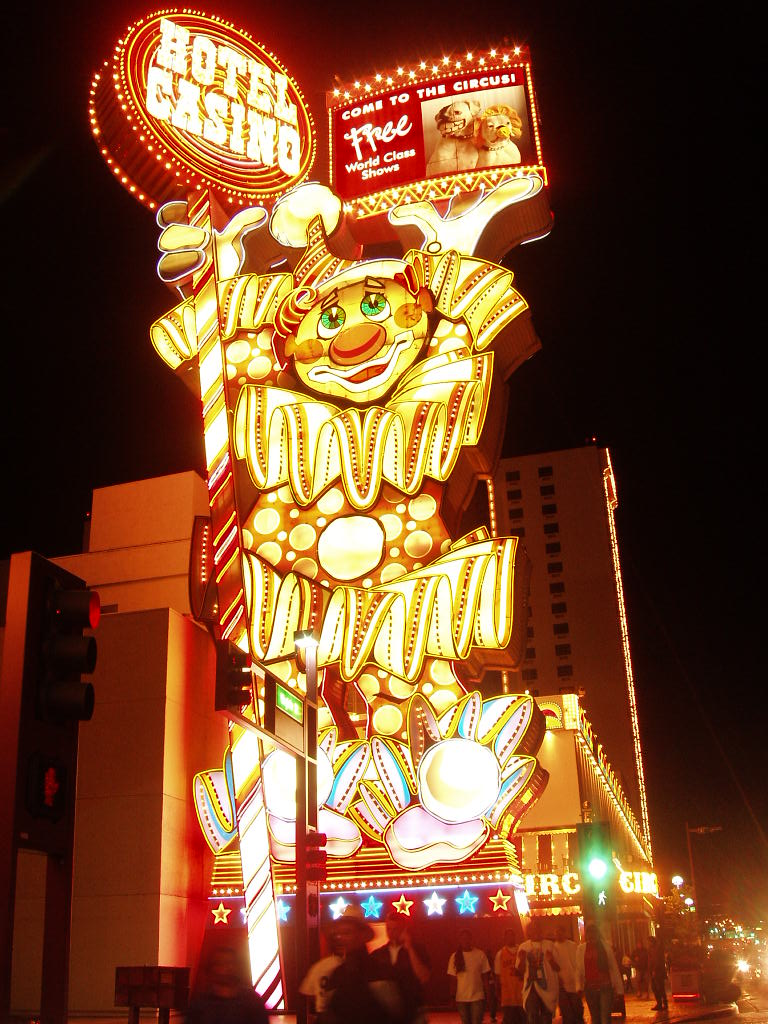
- Interactive map of Circus Circus Reno
- Location: Reno, Nevada, U.S.; 500 North Sierra Street; 39.531428°N 119.815698°W
- Opened: July 1, 1978; 48 years ago
- Theme: Circus
- No. of rooms: 1,620
- Gaming space: 66,515 sq ft (6,179.4 m^{2})
- Permanent shows: Casino cabaret Circus acts
- Signature attractions: Carnival midway
- Owner: Caesars Entertainment
- Architect: David Jacobson Associates; Worth Group
- Renovated in: 1981: North Tower; 1985: Sky Tower; 1995: Silver Legacy Sky Bridge access 1997: North Parking Garage and Art Gecko's Southwest Grill; 1998: Main Street Deli; 1999: Courtyard Buffet, Kokopelli's Sushi and Three Ring Coffee Shop; 2000: Amici's Pasta & Pizza; 2001: Amici's Pasta & Steaks; 2002: The Steakhouse at Circus; 2004: Americana Café and Bonici Brothers; 2008: Smokin' Gecko's BBQ; 2012: Dos Geckos Cantina; 2016: Carnival midway, Sips Coffee & Tea and El Jefe's Cantina; 2017: Kanpai Sushi, North Tower, Panda Express, Piezzetta Pizza Kitchen, The Habit Burger Grill, Madame Butterwork's Curious Café and Yogurt Beach; 2018: Sky Tower
- Website: www.caesars.com/circus-circus-reno

Circus Circus Reno is a hotel and casino located in Downtown Reno, Nevada. It anchors a network of connected hotel-casinos in the downtown Reno core that includes Silver Legacy Reno and Eldorado Reno and are owned and operated by Caesars Entertainment. It includes a 1,620 room hotel and a 66,515 sq ft (6,179.4 m^{2}) casino which features free circus acts on a regular basis throughout the day over the midway which also offers 33 carnival games.

It is the second-largest hotel in downtown Reno (and third-largest in the Reno area overall) by number of rooms.

Previous owners of Circus Circus Reno were Mandalay Resort Group, formerly known as Circus Circus Enterprises (1978–2005) and MGM Resorts International, formerly known as MGM Mirage (2005–2015).

== History ==
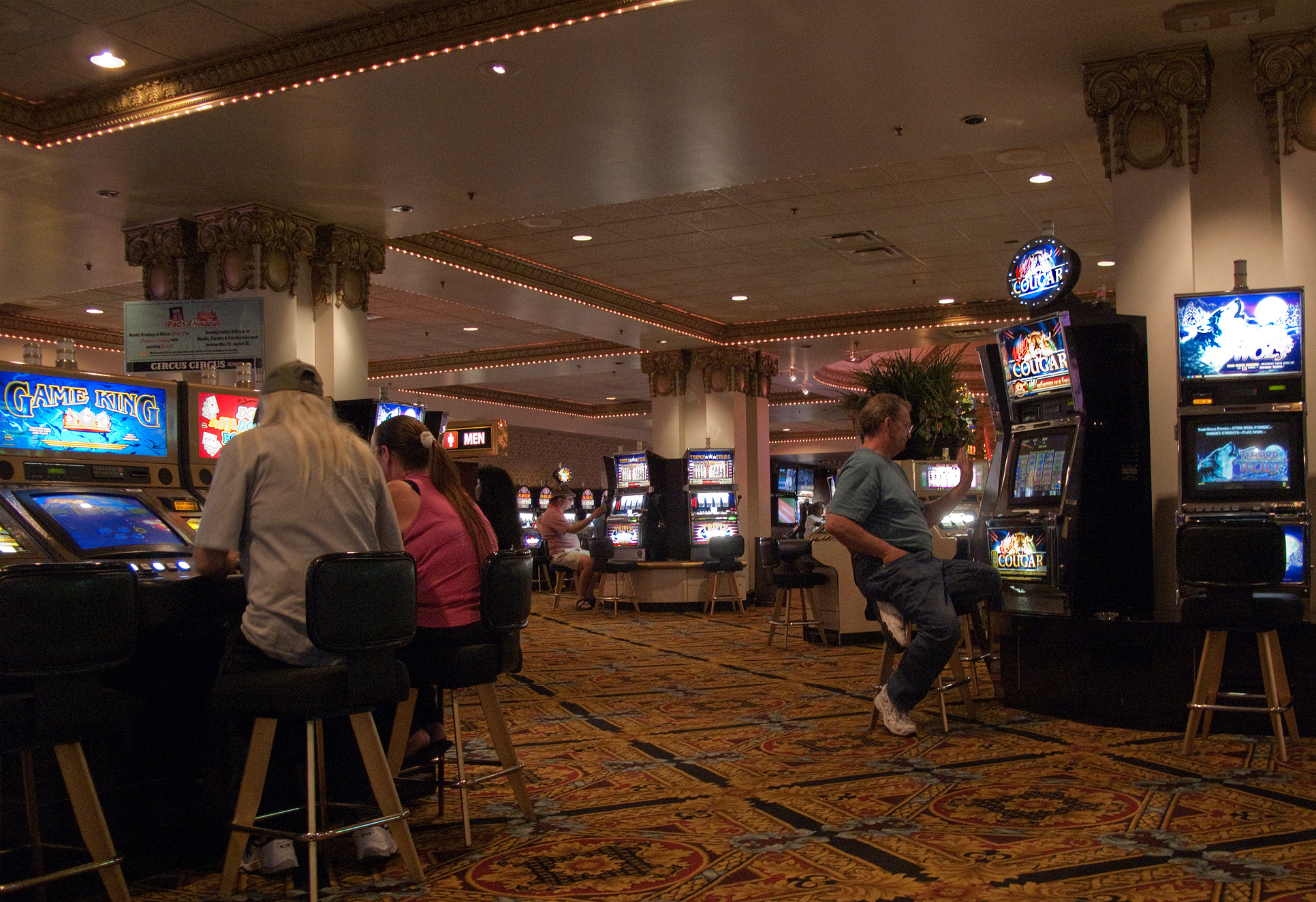
The casino at Circus Circus

The main structure was originally built as a Gray, Reid & Wright department store which, at the time, was the only department store in the state of Nevada. Originally opened on November 7, 1957, the structure replaced a prior store location which was destroyed by a gas explosion on February 5, 1957, and is now the site of the Palladio condominiums. The new store contained 40,000 square feet (3,700 m^{2}) of retail space and 6,000 feet (1,800 m) of storage space in a basement and 2 retail floors accessible by escalators, and had 45 departments including an electronics shop selling televisions and radios, a bookstore, record store, and wine shop, as well as a restaurant, beauty salon, and cobbler.

1977 brought about plans to enlarge the store, adding 2 additional floors, 102 hotel rooms and a casino. The casino would have been known as Camp 14 and would have had a logging theme. The south portion of the first floor would have remained under the name Grey Reid's, but would sell only woman's clothing and would contain an expanded beauty salon. The plan never materialized and Grey Reid's moved to a new location in the Old Town Mall (now known as the Reno Town Mall) in July of that year. Instead, the owners were approached by Circus Circus Enterprises, the operating company of Circus Circus Las Vegas. After about a year of renovations, the casino opened on July 1, 1978, about a decade after its Las Vegas counterpart, and on the same day as the opening of the Sahara Reno and the expanded Money Tree Casino. Circus Circus Reno was inspired by the gaming boom spurred by the new MGM Grand Reno, casino companies wanted to gain some of that momentum. The Reno Circus opened with a small hotel and very similar attractions to its Las Vegas counterpart.

It has three hotel towers: The North Tower, the Casino Tower and the Sky Tower. The North Tower, with 625 rooms, was opened in 1981 and has a height of 225 ft (68 m) and 22 floors. The Sky Tower, with 905 rooms, was opened in 1985 and has a height of 278 ft (84 m) and 27 floors. In 1995, extensive renovations were completed, including the remodel of the mezzanine level where the restaurants are located, the midway, and a sky bridge connecting to the Silver Legacy. The towers are connected by a custom made monorail. known as the Sky Tower Shuttle. There are two trams. The north tram and south tram. They both lead to the sky tower.

In 2008, it had planned on adding an indoor swimming pool. Until the opening of the Silver Legacy in 1995, guests at Circus Circus did not have access to swimming facilities. According to a rendering on the Circus Circus website, the pool would have been under a glass canopy, placed atop the sky bridge tram station. As of July 2010, construction has yet to begin, and all references to the project on the resort's website have been removed.

The Topsy The Clown sign was designed by Gordon Tietjen and manufactured by Young Electric Sign Company.

On July 7, 2015, MGM Resorts International agreed to sell its properties in Reno (Circus Circus Reno and a 50% stake in the Silver Legacy) to Eldorado Resorts for $72.5 million. The sale was approved and completed in November later that year.

On September 5, 2016, Eldorado Resorts permanently shut down the Courtyard Buffet (formerly Big Top Buffet). It was replaced with a contemporary fast casual food court (which included Panda Express, Piezzetta Pizza Kitchen and The Habit Burger Grill) which is similar to Station Casinos and other places. The Courtyard Buffet name was used from 1999 to 2016.

== See also ==
- Circus Circus Las Vegas
