= Railroad Pass Casino =

Casino in Henderson, Nevada, United States

Coordinates: 35.9725°N 114.9119°W

Railroad Pass Hotel & Casino

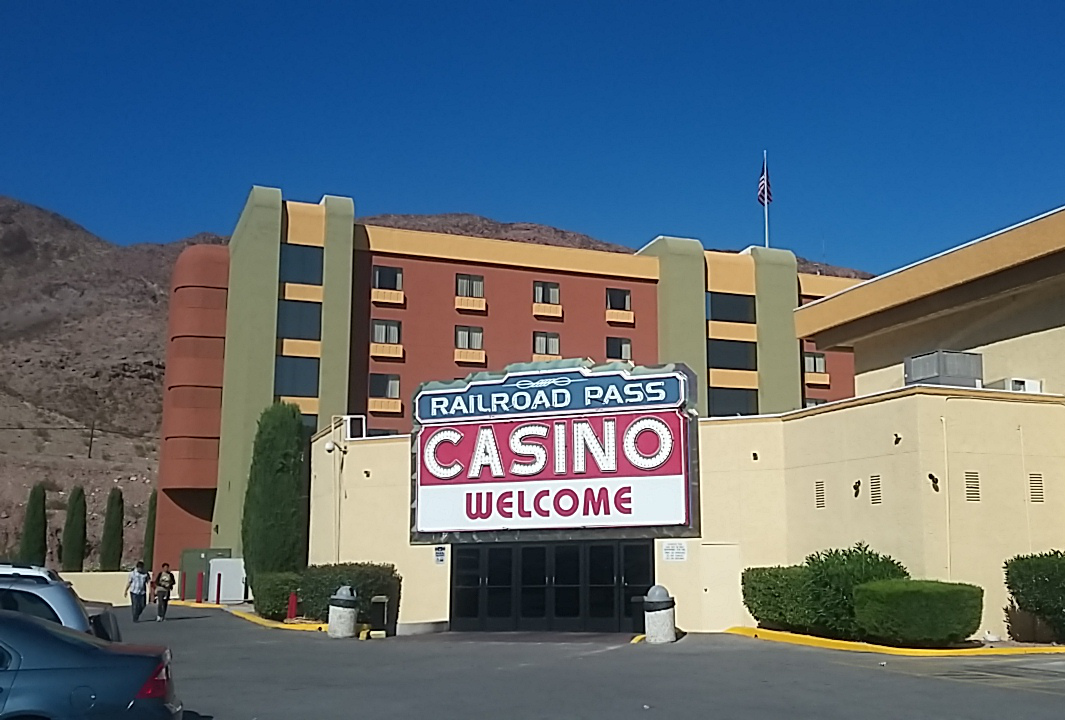
- Interactive map of Railroad Pass Hotel & Casino
- Location: Henderson, Nevada, U.S.; 1500 Railroad Pass Casino Road
- Opened: August 1, 1931; 94 years ago
- No. of rooms: 120
- Gaming space: 12,803 sq ft (1,189 m^{2})
- Owner: Joseph DeSimone
- Previous names: Railroad Pass Club (1931)
- Renovated in: 1986–87
- Website: railroadpass.com

Railroad Pass Hotel & Casino, named after nearby Railroad Pass, is a hotel and casino located in Henderson, Nevada.

The casino has 12,803 square feet (1,189 m^{2}) of gaming space, with 323 slot machines and six table games, and a William Hill sports and race book.

== Location ==
The property is sited in the far southeast corner of the city of Henderson, where it meets the northwestern portion of Boulder City, and is sandwiched between Boulder Highway (US 93/US 95) and the currently (since 1998) orphaned portion of the Boulder City spur on the Union Pacific Railroad's Henderson branch line. The initial phase of the Nevada Department of Transportation's Boulder City Bypass highway project will reconnect those tracks after relocating and upgrading this portion of the Boulder Highway to full freeway status as part of I-11 by 2018, with a new traffic interchange and a dedicated access road maintaining full connectivity to this casino/hotel.

The trailhead for the River Mountains Loop Trail is adjacent to the casino. The original junction of highways 93 and 95 was also once located in front of the property, before the present-day interchange between these two routes was constructed about one mile to the east in Boulder City.

== History ==
The casino opened on August 1, 1931. Railroad Pass Club was the third casino licensed in the state of Nevada and holds license number #4 under its latest name. The casino was popular among Boulder Dam construction workers who lived in Boulder City, where alcohol and gambling were prohibited.

Bob Verchota purchased Railroad Pass in 1975, and began a modernization of the property. In 1985, Verchota sold it to Michael Ensign, William Richardson, and David Belding, owners of the nearby Gold Strike Casino. Railroad Pass became part of their company, Gold Strike Resorts. A five-story, 120-room hotel began construction in 1986, and was opened on January 8, 1987, making Railroad Pass the first Henderson hotel to have more than 100 rooms. Dining areas and a gift shop were also expanded.

Railroad Pass became part of Circus Circus Enterprises (later Mandalay Resort Group), which purchased Gold Strike Resorts in 1995, and then MGM Mirage (later MGM Resorts International), which acquired Mandalay in 2005.

In September 2014, MGM agreed to sell Railroad Pass to Joseph DeSimone, a Henderson-based real estate broker and developer. The sale was completed in April 2015. The casino was operated by Marcus Suan for several months, until DeSimone obtained a gaming license.

Construction on a new hotel tower began in 2021. It would have 127 rooms and be branded as a Holiday Inn Express.
