= Silver Legacy Resort & Casino =

Hotel and casino located in Downtown Reno, Nevada

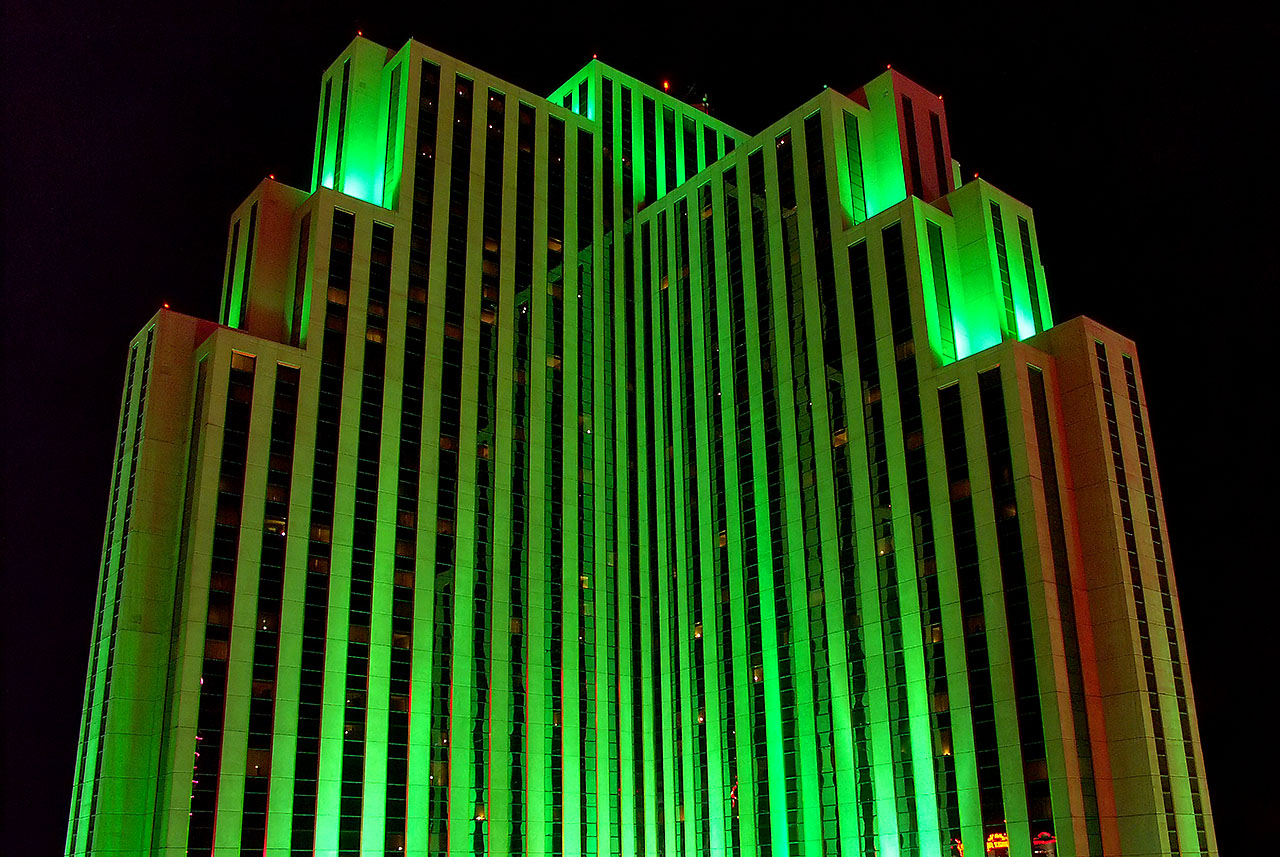
- Interactive map of Silver Legacy Resort & Casino
- Location: Reno, Nevada, U.S.; 407 North Virginia Street; 39.530455°N 119.815103°W
- Opened: July 28, 1995; 30 years ago
- Theme: Victorian – 19th century
- No. of rooms: 1,720
- Gaming space: 89,200 sq ft (8,290 m^{2})
- Permanent shows: Laser Light Show
- Signature attractions: 120 ft Mining Rig
- Notable restaurants: Café Central (formerly Sweetwater Café and Café Sedona); Canter's Delicatessen (formerly Fresh Express Food Court and Triple Play Sports Grill); Ruth's Chris Steak House (formerly Sterling's Seafood Steakhouse); Sips Coffee and Tea; Starbucks; The Pearl Oyster Bar & Grill (formerly Fairchild's Oyster Bar)
- Owner: Caesars Entertainment
- Architect: Urban Design Group
- Renovated in: 2007: Café Sedona and Flavors! The Buffet; 2008–2011: Unknown; 2013: Café Central, Hussong's Cantina-Taqueria, Starbucks and The Pearl Oyster Bar & Grill; 2015: Triple Play Sports Grill; 2017: Canter's Delicatessen and Tequila & Tacos; 2018: Ruth's Chris Steak House
- Website: silverlegacyreno.com

Silver Legacy Resort & Casino is a hotel and casino located in Downtown Reno, Nevada. It anchors a network of connected hotel-casinos in the downtown Reno core that included Circus Circus Reno and Eldorado Reno and are owned and operated by Caesars Entertainment. It has over 1,700 hotel rooms and suites and is the tallest building in Reno.

Previous joint venture owners of Silver Legacy (along with Eldorado Resorts) were Mandalay Resort Group, formerly known as Circus Circus Enterprises (1995–2005) and MGM Resorts International, formerly known as MGM Mirage (2005–2015).

== History ==
=== Early years ===
In 1992, Don Carano, a long time Reno attorney and CEO/Chairman of the Eldorado Hotel Casino and Clyde Turner, CEO of Circus Circus Enterprises joined together to design the Silver Legacy. At the time, Las Vegas in Southern Nevada was growing fast and far overtaking Reno with larger and more lavish casino-hotels. Carano wanted to create a similar, competitive hotel casino-resort. The total cost was projected at $230 million. On July 22, 1993, the special use permit was approved to go ahead with the construction on land owned by Carano, two city blocks which would link the new resort with Eldorado and Circus Circus.

Carano and Turner announced the official name of the resort on December 15, 1994. Following a citywide competition to name Reno's newest resort in more than a decade, the winning name "Silver Legacy" was chosen. It opened on July 28, 1995. An awning on the building's front entrance states that it was established a century earlier, in 1895. This date is a nod to the building's 19th century theme.

The Silver Legacy appears in the 1996 film Kingpin, which features many scenes inside the resort. The 2002 film Waking Up in Reno was also partially filmed inside Silver Legacy.

=== Later years ===
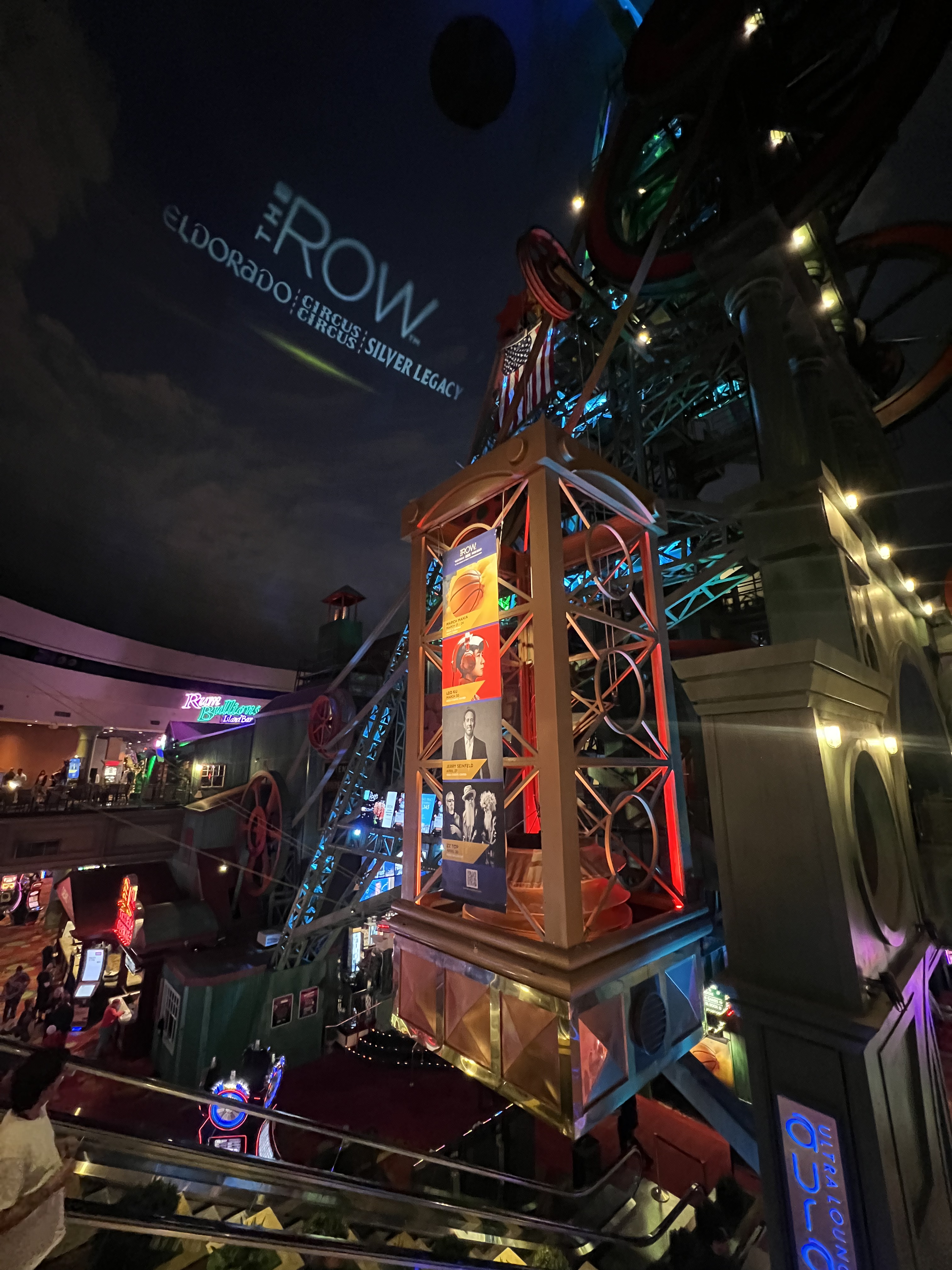
Inside the dome at the Silver Legacy

In 2012, the Silver Legacy failed to restructure $142.8 million in mortgage notes due March 1 through a public offering. The Silver Legacy struggled with its debt load through 2012, eventually filing for Chapter 11 bankruptcy in May. In October 2012, the Silver Legacy emerged from bankruptcy with a restructuring plan approved by the courts.

Carano's eldest son, Gary, was CEO of the property and later on, his next eldest son, Glenn Carano, would join the executive team at the resort as Director of Marketing. In 2014, Glenn became the General Manager while Gary became CEO of Eldorado Resorts.

On July 7, 2015, MGM Resorts International agreed to sell its properties in Reno (Circus Circus Reno and a 50% stake in the Silver Legacy) to Eldorado Resorts for $72.5 million. The sale was approved and completed in November that year. Eldorado Resorts was renamed Caesars Entertainment, Inc. in 2020, after merging with an earlier company known as Caesars Entertainment Corporation.

Like all state casinos, the Silver Legacy closed on March 18, 2020, due to the COVID-19 pandemic in Nevada. The property joined other casinos in reopening on June 4, 2020. The Silver Legacy spa reopened in September with new health and safety measures.

Caesars Entertainment launched a $47 million renovation of Silver Legacy in 2021. The project included the redesign of nearly 1,200 rooms from the fifth through 25th floors.

== Features ==
At 42 stories, the hotel is the largest building in Downtown Reno. It also spent two years as the tallest building in Nevada, and is still the tallest in the state outside of the Las Vegas Valley.

The Legacy is typically lit green at night and is referred to by many as the "Emerald City" of Reno. Visitors occasionally compare the green lighting to the appearance of Minas Morgul, from Peter Jackson's adaptation of the Lord of the Rings series. In support of the Nevada Wolf Pack, the Silver Legacy will sometimes turn blue. In 2013, a contest was held online to vote on if the building should turn blue permanently, but it was the color Emerald Green that won the decision.

There are six restaurants inside the Silver Legacy including Café Central (formerly Sweetwater Café and Café Sedona), Canter's Delicatessen (formerly Fresh Express Food Court and Triple Play Sports Grill), Ruth's Chris Steak House (formerly Sterling's Seafood Steakhouse), Sips Coffee and Tea, and Starbucks. The Pearl Oyster Bar & Grill opened in 2013, replacing Fairchild's Oyster Bar.

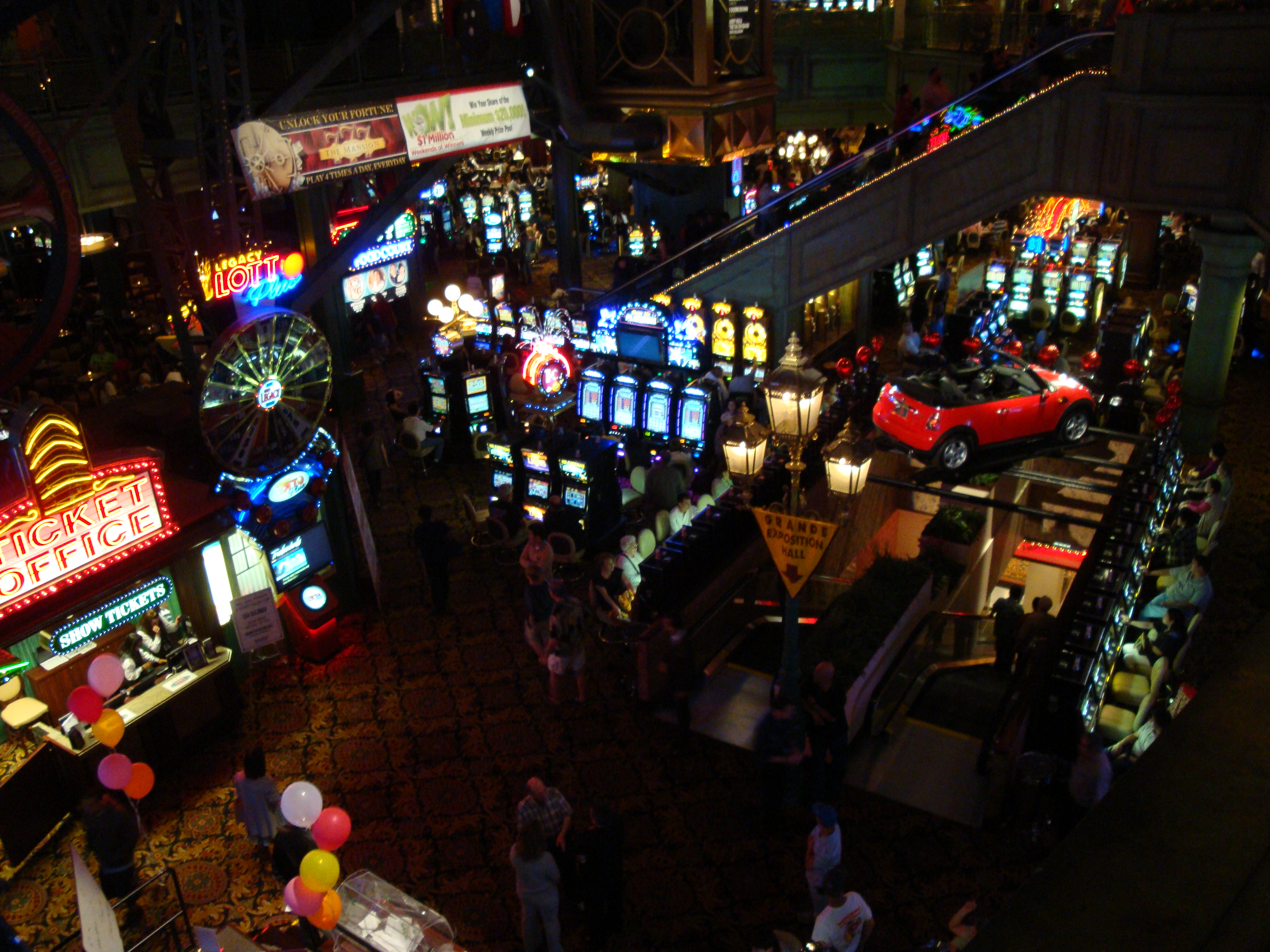
Inside the casino at the Silver Legacy

In July 2013, Silver Legacy founded the Biggest Little City Wing Fest, a three-day chicken wing festival held on Virginia Street in front of the casino. The festival started with just a few local wing cookers but has since grown to feature 25 businesses from around the United States.

In October 2018, Eldorado Resorts permanently shut down the Flavors! The Buffet (formerly The Victorian Buffet).

British celebrity chef Gordon Ramsay opened two new restaurants at the Silver Legacy, Ramsay's Kitchen and Gordon Ramsay Fish & Chips, in 2023. The restaurants are his 16th and 17th establishments under the Caesars Entertainment brand.

There are eight retail stores located in the resort including The Boutique, Tradewinds Casualwear, Reflections, Carriage House, The Gift Shop, and Chester's Harley-Davidson. In 2015, Silver Legacy opened two new retail stores, including a new children's store named Lil' Big Stuff Kid's Sweet Boutique which sells children's clothing, toys, accessories, and a large variety of retro candy. Libellule Florals is the other retail outlet that opened.
