= Hacienda (Las Vegas) =

Former Las Vegas hotel and casino

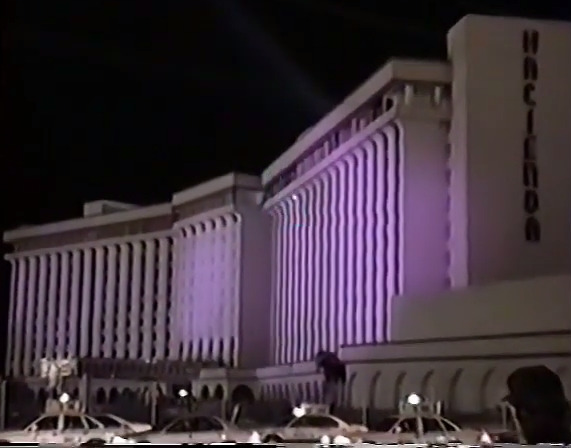
- The Hacienda in 1996, shortly before its implosion.

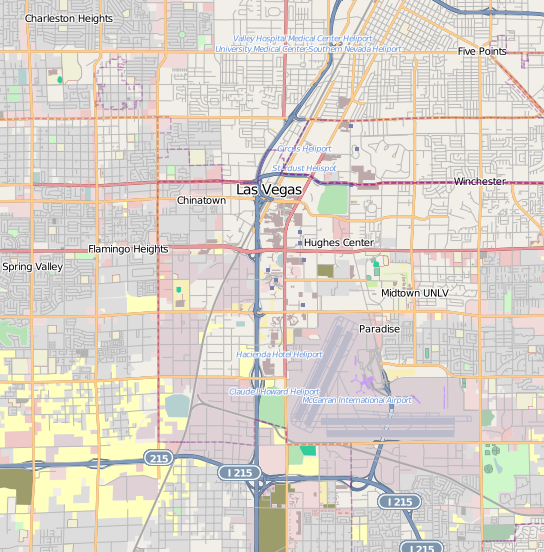
- Location within Las Vegas Boulevard Location within Nevada
- Interactive map of Hacienda
- Location: Paradise, Nevada; 3950 Las Vegas Blvd S; 36°5′19″N 115°10′39″W
- Opened: June 1956 (hotel); October 17, 1956 (casino)
- Closed: December 1, 1996; 29 years ago
- Theme: Mexican
- No. of rooms: 266 (1956); 538 (1980); 1,137 (1990s)
- Gaming space: 19,000 sq ft (1,800 m^{2}) (prior to 1990)
- Permanent shows: Lance Burton (1991–96)
- Notable restaurants: Charcoal Room
- Casino type: Land-based
- Owner: Warren Bayley (until 1964); Judy Bayley (1964–71); Joan Rashbrook and Calvin Magleby (1972); Allen R. Glick and Eugene Fresch (1972–77); Argent Corporation (1974–77); Paul Lowden (1972–95); Circus Circus Enterprises (1995–96)
- Architect: Homer A. Rissman
- Renovated in: 1965, 1975, 1980, 1991

The Hacienda was a hotel and casino on the Las Vegas Strip in Paradise, Nevada, that operated from 1956 to 1996. It was opened by Warren Bayley, who owned other Hacienda properties in California as well. Bayley opened the hotel portion in June 1956, although the opening of the casino was delayed as the Nevada Gaming Control Board objected to his choice of casino manager, Jake Kozloff. The casino portion eventually opened on October 17, 1956. The $6 million property had 266 rooms and the largest pool on the Las Vegas Strip. Like its sister properties in California, the resort included a neon sign that depicted a cowboy riding a palomino horse.

The Hacienda was built at the south end of the Strip, making it the first resort to be seen by tourists driving up from California. The Hacienda was located by itself at the time, a distance away from other resorts. Because of its location, most guests did not bother to visit the other resorts. The Hacienda was the first Las Vegas resort to target a family clientele, and until 1962, it operated a plane service to fly in guests from out of state.

When Bayley died in 1964, his wife Judy Bayley took over the Hacienda. At the time, she was the only female casino owner in Las Vegas. She died in 1971, and the resort was sold to a group of investors, who added an RV park for guests. The Hacienda was sold entirely to Paul Lowden, a part owner, in 1977. The Hacienda hosted several ice-skating shows starting in the 1970s, and would later host Lance Burton in a magic show that ran for five years. The Little Church of the West was relocated onto the Hacienda property in 1979, and 11-story hotel towers were added in 1980 and 1991, for a total of 1,137 rooms.

Circus Circus Enterprises purchased the Hacienda in 1995, with plans to build a new resort in its place. The Hacienda closed on December 1, 1996, and the hotel was imploded at the end of the month as part of a televised New Year's Eve special. The last portions of the hotel were demolished in January 1997. Circus Circus Enterprises opened the Mandalay Bay resort on the site in 1999, and the Hacienda name was licensed to another property, the Hacienda Hotel and Casino, near Boulder City, Nevada. The neon horse sign was preserved and put on display in downtown Las Vegas.

== History ==
=== Construction and opening ===
The Hacienda initially began as a hotel-casino project called Lady Luck, which was being planned by Carlton Adair in 1954. Adair had several partners in the project, including Stanley Burke, a Sacramento man who owned the land. Adair also brought in Warren "Doc" Bayley, a travel columnist and owner of several Hacienda motels in Fresno, Bakersfield, and Indio, California. Under the deal, Adair and his group would have interest in the casino, while Burke would own the land and buildings. Bayley would be in charge of the hotel portion. The owners hoped to have the project finished before the opening of the Tropicana resort down the street.

The Lady Luck project received approval from the Clark County Planning Commission in January 1955, and construction was underway later that year. The project struggled to get investors, and its financing fell apart before construction reached the halfway mark. Bayley took over the project, renamed it the Hacienda, and removed Adair, leaving only Bayley and Burke. Bayley agreed to lease the property for $55,000 per month for 15 years.

The Hacienda was designed by Homer A. Rissman, and was built like other Las Vegas properties at the time, with a central building for the casino and restaurants, and motel structures to provide lodging. Rissman designed the project so that each motel building would connect to the casino via glass-walled corridors. Before it opened, the Hacienda included a 300-seat dining theater. Because of the high cost for performers, the Hacienda owners decided to refocus the space on hosting conventions rather than live entertainment, which instead would be offered in a lounge.

The hotel portion opened in June 1956. Because Bayley and Burke lacked casino experience, they chose Jake Kozloff, a Las Vegas casino investor, to manage the gaming operations. However, the Hacienda was denied a gaming license, as the Nevada Gaming Control Board was opposed to Kozloff's involvement because of past activities. A gaming license was issued after Kozloff was removed from the project, and the casino eventually opened on October 17, 1956. The $6 million Hacienda had 266 rooms and the largest swimming pool on the Las Vegas Strip. Like the other Hacienda hotels, the Las Vegas property featured a roadsign neon sign that depicted a cowboy riding a palomino horse. It was designed by YESCO and was among the company's most popular signs.

The Hacienda was built on the south end of the Las Vegas Strip, making it the first resort to be seen by motor tourists arriving from California. It sat alone at the time, surrounded by desert and away from the other resorts on the Strip. Gaming executives initially predicted that the Hacienda would struggle due to its location, although the resort prospered for many years. Its remote location ensured that most guests stayed on the property rather than visiting other resorts. The Hacienda was also popular because of its location near the McCarran International Airport, although the resort never had the same success as other Strip properties such as the Dunes and the Sands. Because it lacked the same elegance as other resorts on the Strip, the Hacienda received the negative nickname "Hayseed Heaven". The Hacienda was built as a budget resort and was the first Las Vegas resort aimed at attracting families. It included a go-cart track and a miniature golf course for children, and Las Vegas' first par 3 golf course. It also offered the Palomino room, which was used for shows and small parties.

In 1957, a few months after the opening, Kozloff filed a writ of attachment against the Hacienda, alleging that he was owed $71,000 from a loan he made to the property. The hotel posted a bond which nullified the writ. Three months later, Burke made various allegations against Bayley and requested that the Hacienda be placed into receivership. Bayley denied the allegations, which included a claim that he had mishandled finances. Later that year, plans were being made to add additional hotel rooms.

=== Promotion ===
Bayley devised numerous ideas to promote the resort. Shortly after its opening, he formed Hacienda Airlines, offering packages that included transportation from Los Angeles to the Hacienda as well as a room and some casino chips. The airline service proved to be successful, prompting Bayley to increase the number of planes. Its success was attributed to low fares, frequent advertising in California, and its catering to working-class tourists. The service would later extend to other U.S. cities. The airline included DC-3s, DC-4s and Lockheed Constellations, eventually numbering as many as 30 aircraft. One plane included a piano bar with actor Dick Winslow, who provided musical entertainment during the ride. The flights also offered champagne, and featured young women modeling lingerie for the passengers, who were mostly men. By the end of 1960, the Hacienda had flown in 150,000 people, making it the largest consumer of California champagne.

The flights eventually stopped in 1962, following an order from the Civil Aeronautics Board (CAB). The agency alleged that the Hacienda was operating as an airline, and the resort was not licensed to provide such service. The Hacienda denied this and stated that its guests were flown in for free, saying that they paid only for food and a hotel room. However, because guests paid before boarding the plane, CAB determined that they were essentially paying for a plane fare.

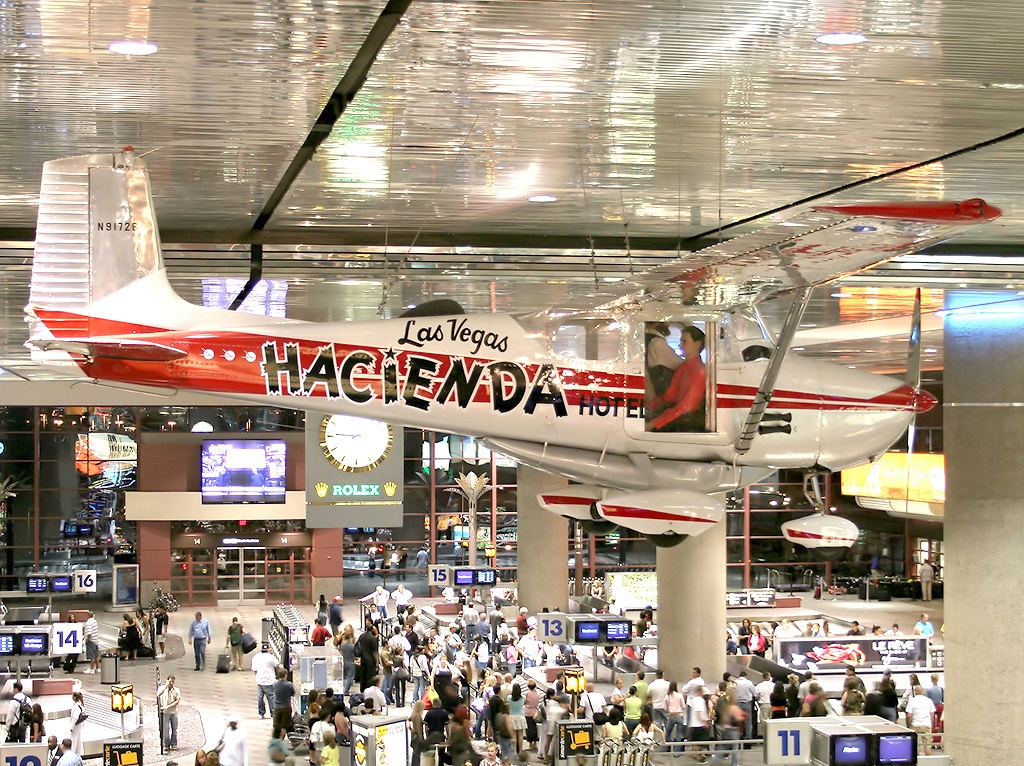
The Cessna 172 sponsored by the Hacienda, on display at the Harry Reid International Airport.

The resort also offered the Hacienda Holiday, a promotional program for tourists in which $10 casino chips were given away as part of a $16 package deal. In 1958, the Clark County licensing board ordered the Hacienda to halt this program, objecting to the fact that the chips were redeemable in the casino. The board said that these chips could be used for other services, but it was opposed to their use in the casino, stating that this would promote gambling. The promotion would be offered for at least the next 20 years, eventually becoming the Hacienda Champagne Holiday.

From December 1958 to February 1959, the Hacienda sponsored a flight endurance record when two men took turns flying a Cessna 172 across the southwestern United States for a period of 64 days. However, the promotion did not turn out as planned. Newspapers did not report on the story until 30 days after the plane took off, and they declined to mention the Hacienda. Dick Taylor, the Hacienda's general manager, said, "The papers, detecting a publicity stunt, did what they felt they had to do. They deleted the Hacienda name from all reports, and even went so far as to blank out the Hacienda name that was painted so large along the side of the plane."

=== Ownership changes ===
Bayley died of a heart attack in 1964, and his widow, Judith Bayley, took over the Hacienda. At the time, Bayley was the only female casino owner in Las Vegas, earning her a nickname as the "First Lady of Gambling". She lacked business training, and found the casino operation to be more complicated than initially expected. She lost hundreds of dollars in her first few months. Under her management, the Hacienda offered shuffleboard and babysitting services for guests, maintaining its appeal as a family resort. A lounge, known as the Jewel Box, was remodeled and reopened in 1965, followed by the opening of a keno room. Las Vegas mayor Oran Gragson attended both openings. One county commissioner had opposed the keno addition, stating that it would add a "honky tonk" atmosphere that was common in the city's Fremont Street area. In 1966, the Clark County Commission threatened to shut down the Hacienda unless Bayley made improvements to a resort that her company was building at Mount Charleston.

To focus on the Las Vegas Hacienda, Bayley sold off the California hotels in 1970, with the exception of one located in El Segundo. In December 1971, Judy Bayley died of cancer at the age of 56. Bayley's estate left the Hacienda to her assistant Joan Rashbrook and lawyer Calvin Magleby. Several weeks after Bayley's death, Magleby announced that American Mining and Smelting Inc. would purchase the Hacienda, with plans for expansion and remodeling of the resort. However, the sale was never completed. Later in 1972, the Hacienda was sold for $5 million to a group of buyers, which included Allen R. Glick, Paul Lowden, and Eugene Fresch. Lowden had raised $250,000 to purchase a 15-percent interest in the property, and he also became the resort's entertainment director.

In 1973, the Hacienda began construction on Travel World, an adjacent RV park for its guests. In 1974, the Hacienda became part of Glick's company, Argent Corporation, which held a controlling interest. Fresch and Lowden also retained interests. The 452-space RV park, later called Ramada Camp Inn, was opened in 1975. It was part of a $7 million renovation of the resort. In 1976, Argent announced that it would sell the Hacienda for $21 million to Hawaiian businessman Joseph Gennitti, who would also take over $11 million in debt. The deal ended after Gennitti failed to provide Glick with details about financing the purchase. Subsequently, two opposing investment groups began negotiations to purchase the Hacienda. Later that year, state investigators found that money had been skimmed from slot machines at Glick's casinos, including the Hacienda.

In January 1977, it was announced that Lowden, the hotel's president, would purchase the remaining interest from Argent and Fresch for $21 million. Lowden worked with several individuals to raise money for his purchase. The Nevada Gaming Control Board accused Lowden of being deceitful, alleging that people with questionable records would have hidden interests in the Hacienda and control over it. Lowden denied this, stating that he would be the sole buyer. The board recommended against his purchase, but was overridden by the Nevada Gaming Commission. According to commission chairman Harry Reid, there was no evidence of hidden interests. He said that audit agents in the case "didn't do a very good job in their investigation." The sale was completed in July 1977.

In 1978, the Hacienda began offering deluxe rooms and suites as timeshares. Within two years, the hotel had 3,000 timeshare members. The Hacienda was associated with Resort Condominiums International, an exchange network that allowed timeshare owners to trade their units. The Little Church of the West, located further north on the Strip, was relocated to the Hacienda property in 1979, making room for the new Fashion Show Mall. By 1980, the Hacienda included a popular steakhouse known as the Charcoal Room. A $30 million expansion of the Hacienda was underway in 1980, scheduled for completion later that year. It included an 11-story tower with 300 rooms, adding on to the hotel's 538-room count. Also added was a 22,000 sq ft (2,000 m^{2}) convention center, known as the Matador Arena. In addition to small conventions, it also hosted monthly, televised matches between professional boxers.

At the end of 1982, Wayne Newton was in discussions to become a co-owner in the Hacienda, as well as Lowden's other Strip resort, the Sahara. After two months of negotiations, Newton decided against the idea, as he was considering other resorts for purchase. In the mid-1980s, the RV park operated as the Hacienda Adventure Camperland. It occupied 16 acres, and included 451 hook-ups, a pool, and a playground. In 1989, Lowden announced a $30 million plan to add a 400-room tower and to expand the casino. The tower was completed in 1991, bringing the room count to 1,137. The expansion also doubled the 19,000 sq ft (1,800 m^{2}) casino.

=== Final years ===
In its final years, the Hacienda was owned by Lowden through his company, Sahara Gaming Corporation. The resort struggled as new megaresorts were opened nearby, including the Excalibur (1990) and the Luxor (1993), both owned by Circus Circus Enterprises. In September 1994, Sahara Gaming stated that it was receiving offers to purchase the Hacienda, and that such offers would be considered for the right price. In January 1995, Bill Bennett announced that he would buy the Hacienda and adjacent acreage. Bennett was a director for Circus Circus Enterprises and had previously served as the company chairman. Bennett planned to rename the Hacienda and give it a South American theme. His plans would include extensive renovations and the addition of approximately 2,000 hotel rooms. However, his impending purchase was complicated by a corporate clause which would give Circus Circus Enterprises the right to purchase the resort instead of him.

Shortly after Bennett's plans were announced, Circus Circus filed a lawsuit to prevent his purchase, stating that he was aware of the company's plans to buy the property and that he proceeded anyway. The Hacienda occupied 47 acres, and Circus Circus wanted to buy an adjacent 74 acres to build a new resort on both parcels, connecting with the Luxor and Excalibur. Bennett and Circus Circus agreed to a settlement in March 1995, allowing the company to buy the Hacienda for $80 million and the 74 acres for another $73 million. Lowden said that an inability to reach an agreement with the Culinary Workers Union was a major factor in choosing to sell the Hacienda.

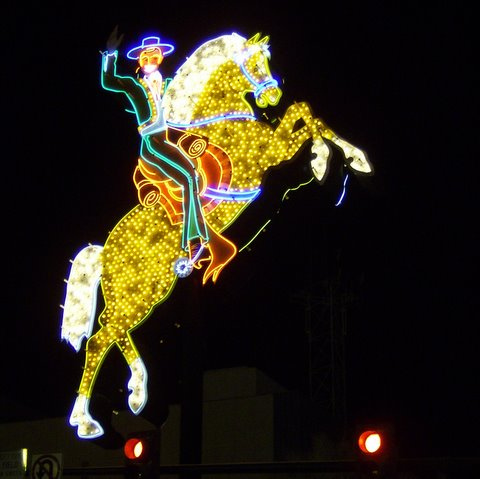
Horse and rider sign from the Hacienda, on display in downtown Las Vegas

The Hacienda's impending closure was announced in September 1996, as Circus Circus proceeded with plans to replace it. The closure would affect 900 employees. After 40 years, the Hacienda closed at 4:00 p.m. on December 1, 1996. The resort's fixtures and hotel furnishings were donated to local charities. A few days later, the Little Church of the West was relocated down the street. The resort's horse and rider neon sign was also saved, being put on display in downtown Las Vegas. The Neon Museum had the sign refurbished at a cost of $60,000, and it was then installed in its new location a couple weeks prior to the Hacienda's closure. Before the Hacienda was demolished, the stairwells and stripped interiors of the hotel were used in a firefighter training mission to aid them in the event of a real high-rise fire. More than 30 local firefighters rushed through the hotel in reaction to an imaginary fire, situated on the fifth floor.

Controlled Demolition, Inc. (CDI) was hired to demolish the 11-story hotel through implosion. CDI was usually given six months' notice, although Circus Circus Enterprises wanted the Hacienda demolished in 30 days for New Year's Eve, as part of a televised event that would compete with the annual Times Square Ball celebration in New York City. After the Hacienda's closure, salvage crews removed equipment such as air conditioners, and they had to knock out walls in the hotel's southern end stairwell. This presented a potential problem for CDI, as wall strength is an important factor in properly controlling an implosion. CDI expected that the south end would not fall with the rest of the hotel. All of the walls in the hotel were built to be reinforced.

The implosion took place on the night of December 31, 1996, and was televised as the culmination of Fox's New Year's special Sinbad's Dynamite New Year's Eve, where it aired approaching midnight ET. The coverage featured a cameo by ring announcer Michael Buffer. A six-minute fireworks show led up to the implosion at 9:00 p.m. More than 1,000 pounds of explosives were used for the implosion, which was watched by a crowd of more than 300,000 people. As expected, the southern end of the hotel did not fall. The next day, a crew was brought in to bring down the remaining structure with a wrecking ball. Thousands of spectators gathered to watch the final demolition.

Circus Circus Enterprises opened the Mandalay Bay resort on March 2, 1999, replacing the Hacienda. The company also licensed the Hacienda name to the Hacienda Hotel and Casino near Boulder City, Nevada. The name also continues to live on through Hacienda Avenue, a road that runs along the Mandalay Bay property, although a small portion was renamed Mandalay Bay Road.

== Entertainers and shows ==
When the Hacienda opened, several other Las Vegas resorts had suffered financially after competing for high-priced entertainers. Initially, the Hacienda owners did not intend to battle for top performers, and the only live entertainment would be lounge acts. In the late 1950s, the Hacienda debuted a show by Cole Porter called Can-Can. In 1964, the resort hosted the puppet show Les Poupées de Paris. Comedian Hank Henry also performed at the Hacienda during the mid-1960s. The resort also offered shows such as Strictly Burlesque and Topless Models. After taking ownership of the Hacienda, Glick said in 1973 that the resort would return to the "friendly image of the past" by eliminating nude stage shows.

In 1967, the Hacienda hosted a two-hour late-night TV program called The Las Vegas Show on the fledgling United Network. Hosted by Bill Dana and featuring regulars Ann Elder, Pete Barbutti, Danny Meahan, Joanne Worley, Cully Richards and Jack Sheldon, the show (and the network) were shut down after only a month on the air.

In the mid-1970s, the resort offered a nude ice-skating show called Spice on Ice, although it eventually lost interest among audiences as other resorts opened their own topless ice shows. Spice on Ice ran for four years, and was replaced by an ice-skating variety show, Ice Fantasy, in 1977. Another ice show, titled Fire and Ice, debuted in 1982, in the resort's Fiesta showroom. The show included Albert Lucas, who would juggle while ice-skating. The show eventually ended, but returned in 1989, when the Hacienda began reviving its old ice shows. At the time, the show consisted of comedy acts and ice skating.

Comedian Redd Foxx was a frequent performer at the Hacienda during the late 1980s, and he later got married at the Little Church of the West. Magician Lance Burton performed at the Hacienda from 1991 to 1996.
