= Terrible's Hotel & Casino =

Former casino hotel in Jean, Nevada, United States

Coordinates: 35°46′37″N 115°19′40″W

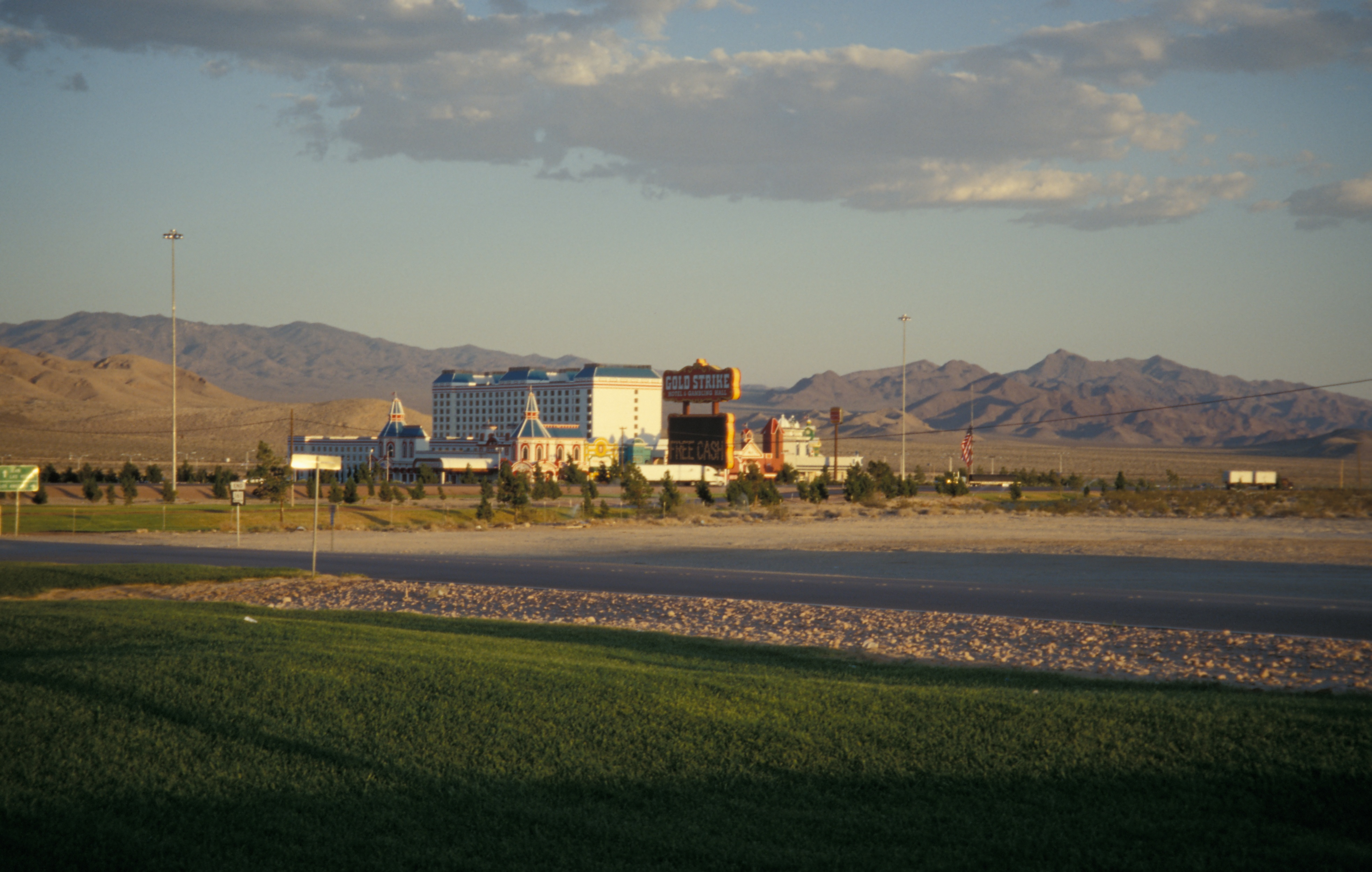
- Location: Jean, Nevada, U.S.; 1 Main Street
- Opened: December 23, 1987; 38 years ago
- Closed: March 17, 2020; 6 years ago
- Theme: Old West
- No. of rooms: 811
- Gaming space: 40,006 sq ft (3,716.7 m^{2})
- Casino type: Land-based
- Owner: JETT Gaming
- Previous names: Gold Strike (1987–2018)

Terrible's Hotel & Casino, formerly the Gold Strike Hotel and Gambling Hall, was a casino hotel in Jean, Nevada, approximately 13 mi (21 km) north of the California state line, and about 32 miles (51 km) south of Downtown Las Vegas. It opened in 1987, and closed in 2020. It was owned and operated by JETT Gaming from 2015 until its closure. It had 811 rooms, several restaurants, and 40,006 square feet (3,716.7 m^{2}) of gaming space. A partial demolition occurred in 2024, with plans to be replaced with an industrial park.

== History ==
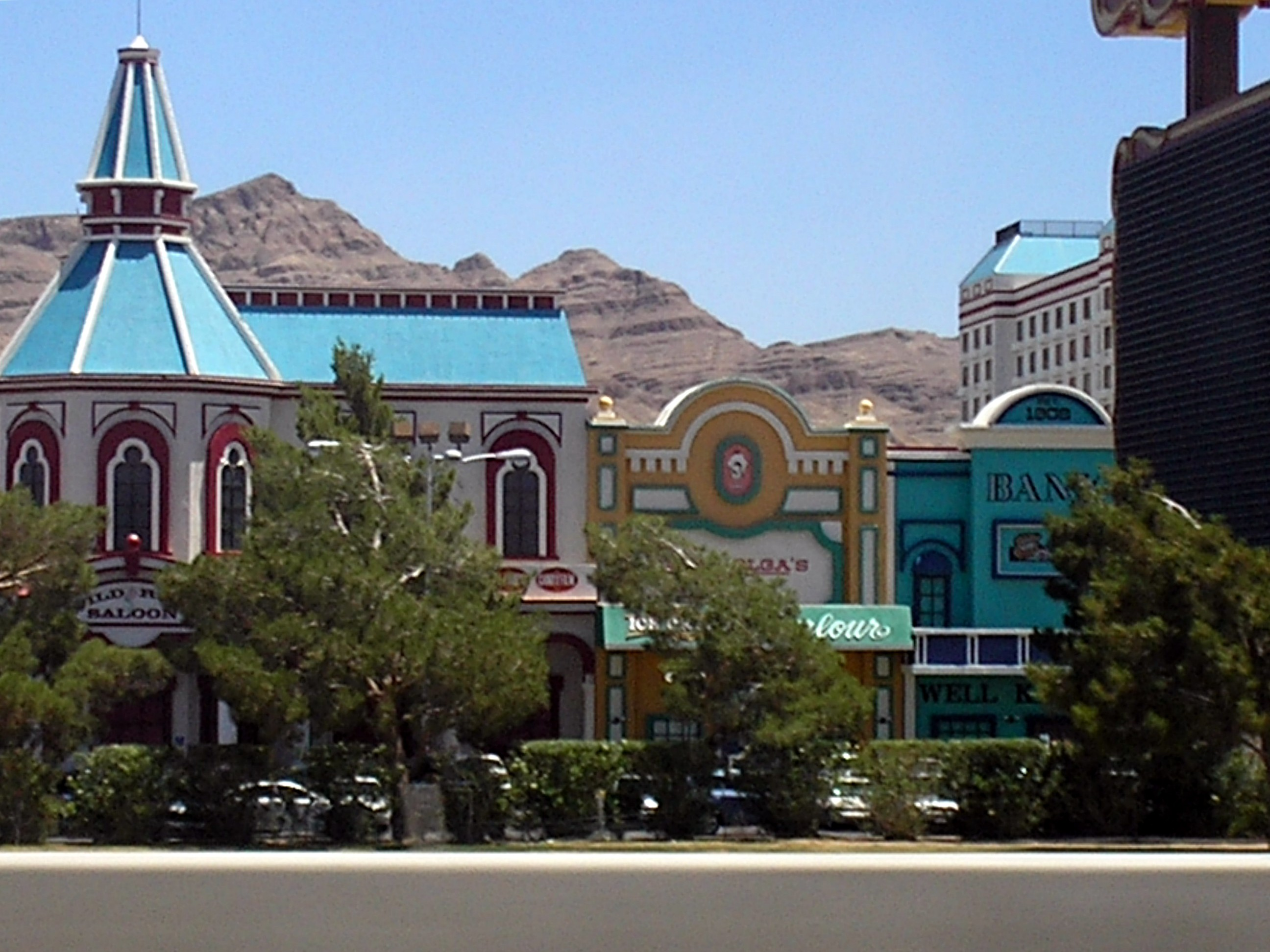
Gold Strike facade, 2008

The Gold Strike was opened on December 23, 1987 by Dave Belding and two other partners who owned the original Gold Strike Hotel near Boulder City. After it did better business than expected, a sister property, the Nevada Landing Hotel and Casino, was developed on the other side of the freeway and opened in 1989.

The two properties became part of the Gold Strike Resorts family of companies, which was acquired in 1995 by Circus Circus Enterprises (later named Mandalay Resort Group). They were then acquired in 2005 by MGM Mirage (later named MGM Resorts International) as part of its buyout of Mandalay.

In February 2007, MGM Mirage announced plans to close the Nevada Landing and build a master-planned community and a new casino hotel on the 166 acres (0.67 km^{2}) it owned in the area, in a joint venture with American Nevada Corp. and the Cloobeck Cos. The Gold Strike would remain open. The Nevada Landing closed in March 2007 and was demolished, leaving the Gold Strike as the only casino in Jean. The planned redevelopment was canceled due to the 2008 financial crisis.

In October 2014, MGM agreed to sell the Gold Strike for $12 million to JETT Gaming, owned by the Herbst family. The sale was completed in May 2015.

JETT Gaming performed upgrades and renovations to the property, including the installation of a new video marquee sign, the Off-Road Motorsports Hall of Fame, and a display of cars from popular movies. On November 1, 2018, the name of the casino was changed from Gold Strike to Terrible's, the same name used by the Herbst family's convenience stores and gas stations.

Terrible's and other state casinos closed temporarily on March 17, 2020, due to the COVID-19 pandemic in Nevada. On November 22, 2021, it was announced that the Terrible's closure was permanent. On February 24, 2022, the property was sold for $45 million to real estate company Tolles Development, which planned to demolish it to make way for an industrial park. Partial demolition occurred on January 6, 2024.

== In popular culture ==
Terrible's is the primary filming location for Absolute Dominion, a 2025 American dystopian science fiction action film by Lexi Alexander, set in 2063, with much of the human population killed off by religious terrorists.
