= Grand Victoria Casino Elgin =

Riverboat casino in Illinois, USA

Coordinates: 42.031046°N 88.280318°W

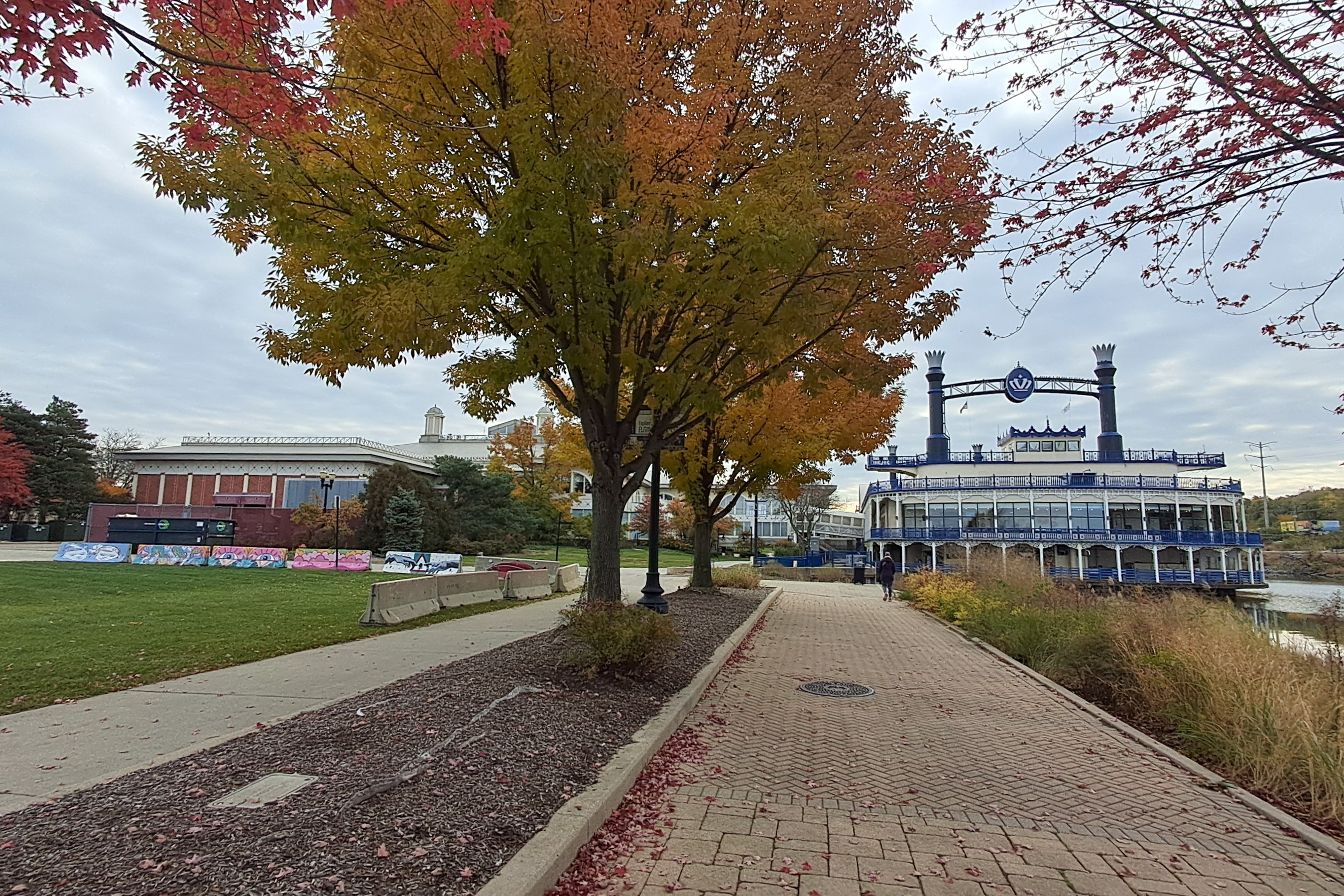
- Grand Victoria Casino, showing the building (left) and the riverboat (right)
- Interactive map of Grand Victoria Casino Elgin
- Location: Elgin, IL 60120 United States; 250 South Grove Avenue
- Opened: October 6, 1994
- Gaming space: 29,850 sq ft (2,773 m^{2})
- Notable restaurants: Buckinghams; Indulge; Prime Burger Bar; Crave Deli
- Casino type: Riverboat
- Owner: Caesars Entertainment
- Public transit access: Pace
- Website: grandvictoriacasino.com

The Grand Victoria Casino Elgin is a riverboat casino in Elgin, Illinois, United States, located about 40 mi (64 km) west of Chicago. It is owned and operated by Caesars Entertainment.

== History ==
The casino was developed by Gold Strike Resorts and Hyatt. Elgin won the fierce competition for the 10th license (the final for the first round of allotments) under the 1990 Riverboat Gambling Act in 1993. The boat would cruise a half-mile on the Fox River, parts of which had to be dredged to accommodate the boat's draft. It opened its doors on October 6, 1994.

Gold Strike was acquired in 1995 by Circus Circus Enterprises, which later changed its name to Mandalay Resort Group, and was then acquired by MGM Mirage in 2005. At the time of the merger in 2005, management of the property was transferred from Mandalay to Hyatt.

In August 2018, MGM and Hyatt sold the casino to Eldorado Resorts (later renamed as Caesars Entertainment) for $328M.

== Casino ==
The casino employs about 1,440 people. The 29,850 sq ft (2,773 m^{2}) facility consists of approximately 1,100 video poker and slot machines in addition to 36 table games.

In addition to games, the casino has banquet and dining facilities including Buckinghams, Crave Deli, and Slice Pizzeria.

== Economic contributions ==
Each year the Grand Victoria Casino Elgin donates 7.5% of its adjusted net operating income to the Kane County Board and 12.5% to the Grand Victoria Foundation. In 2008, Kane County received about $8 million to use for internal programs, about $1 million of which was available for projects benefiting the county's educational, environmental, and economic needs. Grants for these projects are recommended by Kane County's riverboat committee, but both the executive committee and the county board must approve the funds before they can be distributed.

In addition to the Kane County Board and the Grand Victoria Foundation, The city of Elgin receives its own portion of the Grand Victoria's revenue. Casino profits led to the removal of the $25 vehicle license fee as well as a yearly property tax rebate for senior citizens. Today, the city continues to allocate funds for housing restoration. In 2007 specifically, the city allocated twice as much money as usual for housing rehabilitation. Money is also dedicated to the following causes:

- Toy collecting
- Not-for-profit organizations

The Grand Victoria Foundation sponsors additional community programs, such as film screenings, at Gail Borden Public Library in Elgin.

== Revenue reports since 2000 ==
According to the Daily Herald, in 2007 the Grand Victoria Casino Elgin generated more revenue than any other Illinois casino, taking in $437 million, a rise of 13% since 2000. This increase in revenue came as a result of tightening slot machines, and occurred despite a 32% drop in attendance between 2000 and 2007.

As Illinois Gaming Board reports illustrate, the 2008-2009 economic recession led to an overall decrease in revenue among Illinois casinos, particularly the Grand Victoria. The casino's revenue of $25 million for the month of February, 2009 was down 9.9% from the previous year and down 24% from 2007. The Smoke Free Illinois Act, which banned smoking in all enclosed workplaces beginning January 1, 2008, also severely reduced casino attendance. Casino industry officials estimated that Illinois would receive about 20% less in monetary contributions from the casino over the course of 2008, a difference of nearly $144 million.

In an attempt to make up for lost revenue, the Grand Victoria and other Illinois riverboat casinos petitioned for permission to distribute free alcoholic beverages. Supporters of a proposed bill said that the existing law was unclear, while opposing groups cited increased gambling addiction as a likely consequence if free alcohol distribution were to be legalized.

In 2018, the Grand Victoria was third among Illinois riverboat casinos, with gross receipts of $160.7 billion.
