= Gold Strike Resorts =

- Company type: Private
- Industry: Gaming & hospitality
- Defunct: 1995; 31 years ago
- Fate: Acquired by Circus Circus Enterprises
- Headquarters: Jean, Nevada, U.S.

Gold Strike Resorts was a family of gaming companies based in Jean, Nevada.

== History ==
The company's history can be traced to 1977, when David Belding, Michael Ensign, and William Richardson purchased the Gold Strike Hotel and Casino near Boulder City, Nevada. Belding and Richardson acquired their shareholdings from their fathers Don Belding, and Jack Richardson, while Ensign bought out third owner O.L. Raney's shareholding. Ensign was the father of Senator John Ensign and had connections to competitor Circus Circus Enterprises.

In 1994, Gold Strike announced a partnership with Mirage Resorts to build a $250-million casino targeted at budget-conscious visitors, on part of the site of the demolished Dunes golf course on the Las Vegas Strip. It ultimately opened in 1996, following the merger, as the Monte Carlo.

Gold Strike Resorts was acquired in 1995 by Circus Circus Enterprises for $450 million in cash and stock. The acquisition did not include the original Gold Strike near Boulder City, because the owners wanted to pass it on to their children.

== List of properties ==
Gold Strike's properties at the time of its acquisition by Circus were:

- Gold Strike Hotel and Casino — Boulder City, Nevada
- Gold Strike Hotel and Gambling Hall — Jean, Nevada
- Grand Victoria Casino — Elgin, Illinois (50% ownership with Hyatt)
- Monte Carlo, Paradise, Nevada (50% owner in partnership with Mirage Resorts)
- Nevada Landing Hotel and Casino — Jean, Nevada
- Railroad Pass Hotel and Casino — Henderson, Nevada

=== Former properties ===
- Pioneer Club — Las Vegas, Nevada
