= Nevada Landing Hotel and Casino =

Casino hotel in Nevada, United States

Coordinates: 35°47′7″N 115°19′40″W

Nevada Landing

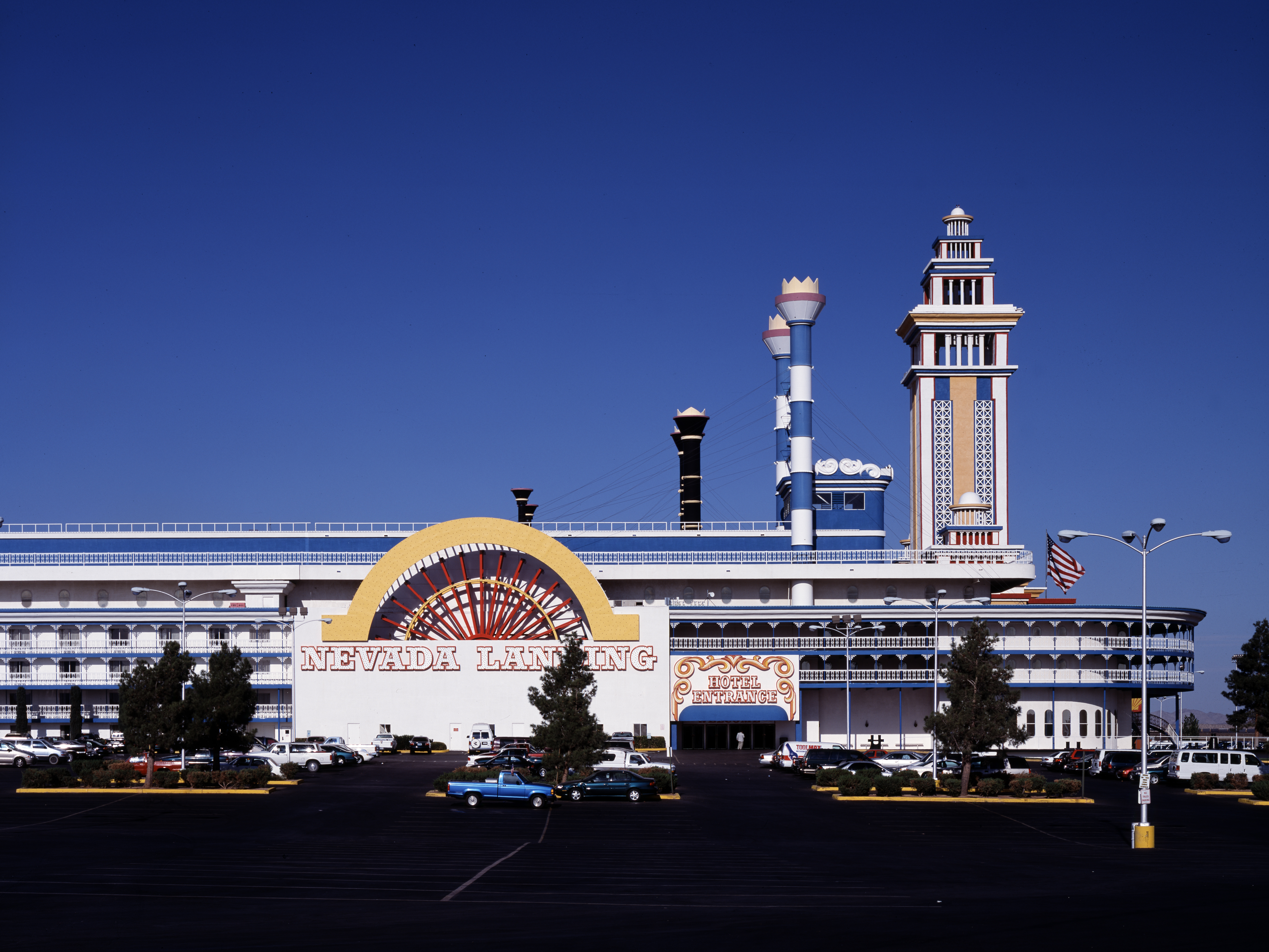
- Interactive map of Nevada Landing
- Location: Jean, Nevada, U.S.; 2 Goodsprings Road
- Opened: 1989; 37 years ago
- Closed: March 20, 2007; 19 years ago
- Theme: Riverboat
- No. of rooms: 303
- Gaming space: 35,800 sq ft (3,330 m^{2})
- Owner: MGM Mirage
- Website: Official website

Nevada Landing was a hotel and casino designed to resemble two riverboats. It was located in Jean, Nevada, United States, near the California state line, within a quarter mile of Interstate 15. The hotel, owned and operated by MGM Mirage, had 303 hotel rooms, four restaurants, over 800 slot machines (including video poker), live keno, table games, banquet facilities and wedding services. The property was typically marketed with its sister hotel, the Gold Strike Hotel and Gambling Hall, located across the I-15 freeway.

== History ==
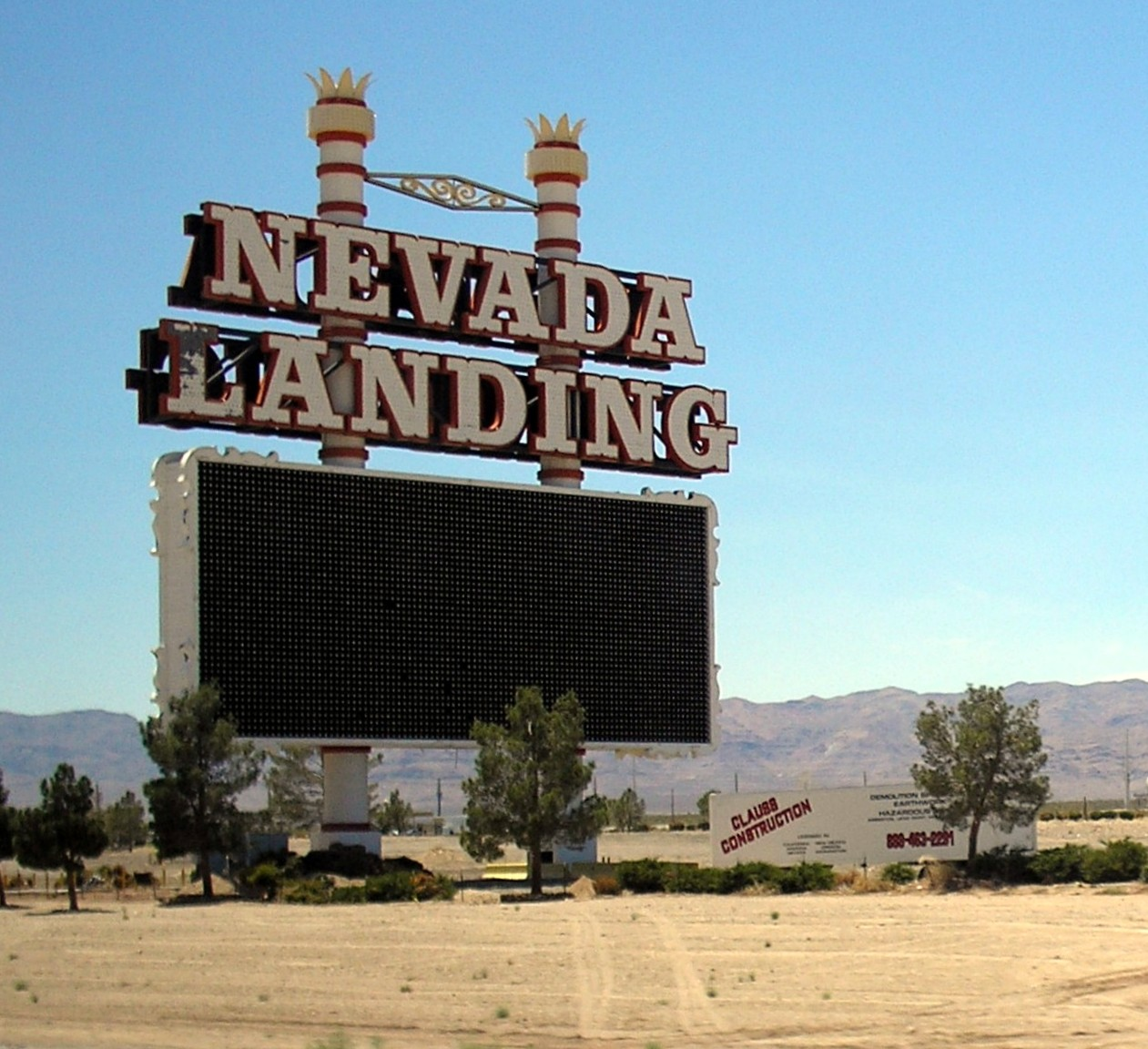
Casino sign, which remained standing after the building was demolished. The sign was demolished in 2010.

The casino opened in 1989, built by a partnership that included David Belding, Mike Ensign and William Richardson. It was first owned by Gold Strike Resorts and in 1995 was sold to Circus Circus Enterprises. Circus Circus Enterprises became Mandalay Resort Group in 1999 and in 2004 was acquired by MGM Mirage.

The hotel and casino closed on March 20, 2007.

Demolition began on the hotel in early March 2008. In April 2008, the hotel was no longer standing. The tall Nevada Landing sign by Interstate 15 was demolished in 2010.

The site along and several large adjoining parcels were sold in 2022 to a developer and are being developed into a 3 million-square-foot mega-warehouse complex.
