= Silver City Casino =

Casino in Nevada, United States

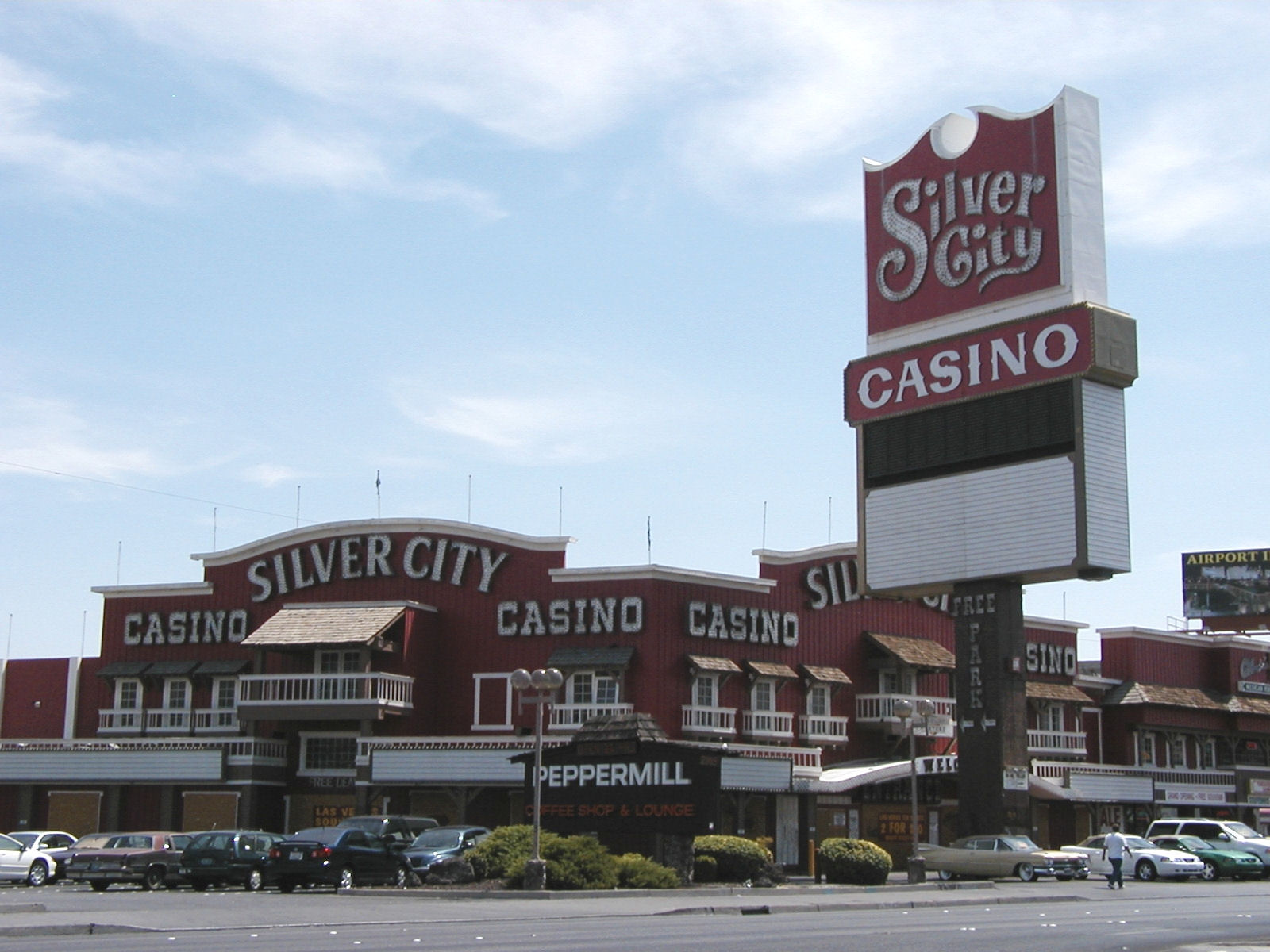
- Silver City

- Location within Las Vegas Strip Location within Nevada
- Interactive map of Silver City Casino
- Location: Winchester, Nevada; 3001 Las Vegas Boulevard South; 36°7′57″N 115°9′44″W
- Opened: 1973
- Closed: October 31, 1999; 26 years ago
- Theme: Western
- Gaming space: 20,000 sq ft (1,900 m^{2})
- Casino type: Land
- Owner: Major Riddle (1974–1981) Circus Circus Enterprises (1981–1999) Luke Brugnara (1999–2002)
- Previous names: Riata Casino

The Silver City Casino was a casino on the Las Vegas Strip in Winchester, Nevada.

== History ==
Major Riddle opened the Silver City Casino in 1974 in the place of Riata Casino, which had opened in 1973 and closed in less than a year. Circus Circus Enterprises purchased the casino in 1981 for $30 million, then refurbished both the interior and exterior. In 1991 it became the strip's first casino to ban cigarette smoking.

In early 1997, investment group United Leisure bought the 8.5-acre property where the Silver City Casino sat, with plans to develop a hotel-casino on the property.

In October 1999, San Francisco businessman Luke Brugnara purchased Silver City from United Casino Holdings LLC, at a cost of $31.5 million. At that time, the 20,000 sq ft (1,900 m^{2}) casino was operated by Mandalay Resort Group, which leased the space. The casino had approximately 150 employees, and was planned to close at the end of the month. The closure occurred on October 31, 1999. Brugnara had applied for a gaming license in August 1999, but was still undergoing a pre-licensing investigation, which prevented him from keeping the casino open. Brugnara planned to fully remodel the casino and to demolish the adjacent Las Vegas Shopping Plaza, which was to become the site of two restaurants. Walgreens opened a store on the property on November 30, 1999.

By January 2000, Brugnara was planning to build a San Francisco-themed resort on the property. Brugnara planned to give Silver City a multimillion-dollar renovation, which would include building around the Walgreens store, with plans to have a fully operational hotel-casino by 2002. In March 2001, Brugnara's request for a gaming license was rejected. Brugnara had stated his intention to sue the Nevada Gaming Control Board if rejected, although he later dropped such plans.

By July 2001, Brugnara had begun reapplying for a gaming license to operate the casino. In May 2002, it was announced that Brugnara had sold the casino and its 3.5-acre property to Angelo, Gordon & Co., which planned to demolish it and build a Ross clothing store. Brugnara retained six acres of vacant property located behind the casino. In 2003, Brugnara was planning to build a 24-story, 304-room hotel and casino resort on the property. The resort, to be named "Tycoon", was to be designed by Lee Linton (architect of Caesars Palace), with an expected cost of approximately $100 million.

The casino was demolished in 2004 to make way for a shopping center known as Silver City Plaza. As of November 2021, a marquee for Silver City Casino still stands on Convention Center Drive.
