= Eldorado Resort Casino =

Hotel and casino located in Downtown Reno, Nevada

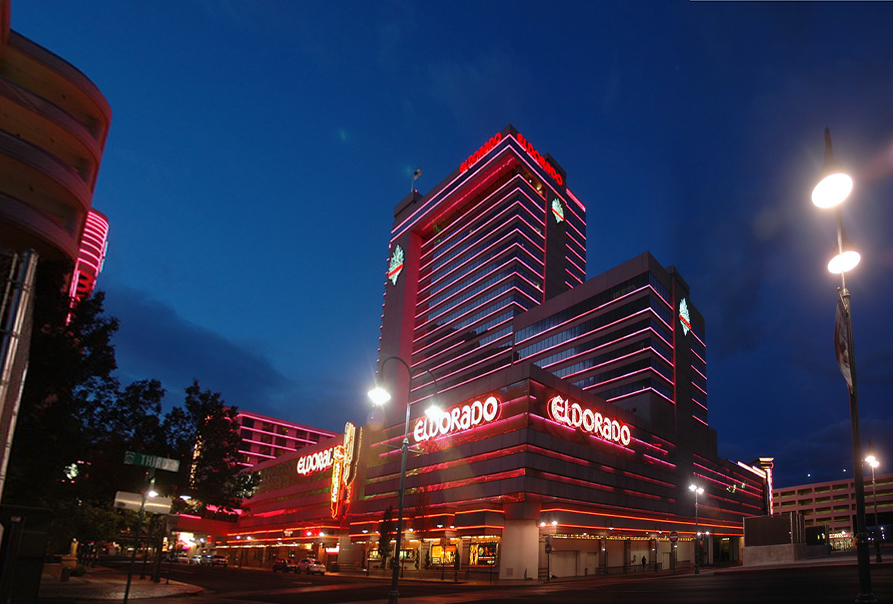
- Interactive map of Eldorado Resort Casino
- Location: Reno, Nevada, U.S.; 345 North Virginia Street; 39.529133°N 119.814593°W
- Opened: May 24, 1973; 53 years ago
- Theme: El Dorado
- No. of rooms: 815
- Gaming space: 78,987 sq ft (7,338.1 m^{2})
- Signature attractions: Eldorado Showroom; NoVi Lounge; Statue Fountain; The Brew Brothers
- Notable restaurants: La Strada; In Room Dining; Millies24; Pho Mein; Roxy; Sushi Sake; The Brew Brothers; The Buffet (until 2020); The Eldorado Coffee Company; Starbucks; The Prime Rib Grill
- Owner: Caesars Entertainment
- Architect: Worth Group
- Renovated in: 1995: Silver Legacy Sky Bridge access 1996: Eldorado Showroom; 2007: Skyline Tower; 2008: Spa Tower; 2008–2010: New rooms, new buffet and Swarovski addition 2014: Skyline Tower; 2016/2017: Sierra & Virginia Towers
- Website: caesars.com/eldorado-reno

Eldorado Resort Casino is a hotel and casino located in Downtown Reno, Nevada. It anchors a network of connected hotel-casinos in the downtown Reno core that included Circus Circus Reno and Silver Legacy Reno and are owned and operated by Caesars Entertainment.

== History ==
Plans for the Eldorado were announced in July 1972 by a group of six investors, including members of Reno's prominent Carano family. The hotel opened on May 24, 1973 with 278 guest rooms, two restaurants, and a casino with 200 slot machines, 9 table games, and a keno game. Also incorporated into the property were a ballroom accommodating up to 750 people, an underground parking garage, and executive suites.

In 1979, the success of the Eldorado Resort Casino prompted what would be the first of many expansions and improvements. Guestrooms were brought to a total of 411 with a further expansion completed in September 1985 adding 20,000 square feet of gaming area and four new restaurants. By 1989, the Eldorado had grown to 814 hotel rooms and boasted its own on-site bakery, pasta and gelato shop and butcher shop. In 1992, the Eldorado added a 10 story parking garage for added convenience to guests.

The completion of another transformation for the Eldorado happened in 1995. Coinciding with the construction of Silver Legacy Reno, a 50/50 joint venture between Eldorado Resorts and MGM Resorts International, the Eldorado added a crossover to the new downtown property connected by the first ever micro-brewery in a casino, The Brew Brothers. The Spa Tower was created, adding 10 floors of luxury accommodations; a 10,175 square foot convention center was opened as well as a 580-seat Broadway-style showroom. A coffee roasting company was added to the list of on-site services and the casino now totaled 78,987 square feet with more than 1,500 slot machines, 55 table games, a keno lounge, race and sportsbook and poker room.

In 2016, Eldorado Resorts announced that it expects to invest more than $50 million in enhancements. Eldorado's master plan for the three connected properties, which span eight city blocks in downtown Reno, also includes renovation of more than 4,100 guest rooms. The properties' upgrade announcement comes a week after the company's agreement to acquire Isle of Capri Casinos.

== Eldorado Showroom ==
The showroom seats 580 and has rotating productions.

== The Brew Brothers ==
The casino houses an on-site microbrewery, The Brew Brothers, which also operates as a music venue and night club. A second Brew Brothers is planned for Scioto Downs Racino in Columbus, Ohio.
