= Edgewater Hotel and Casino =

Hotel and casino in Nevada, United States

Coordinates: 35.16049°N 114.57305°W

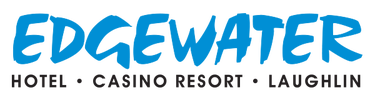

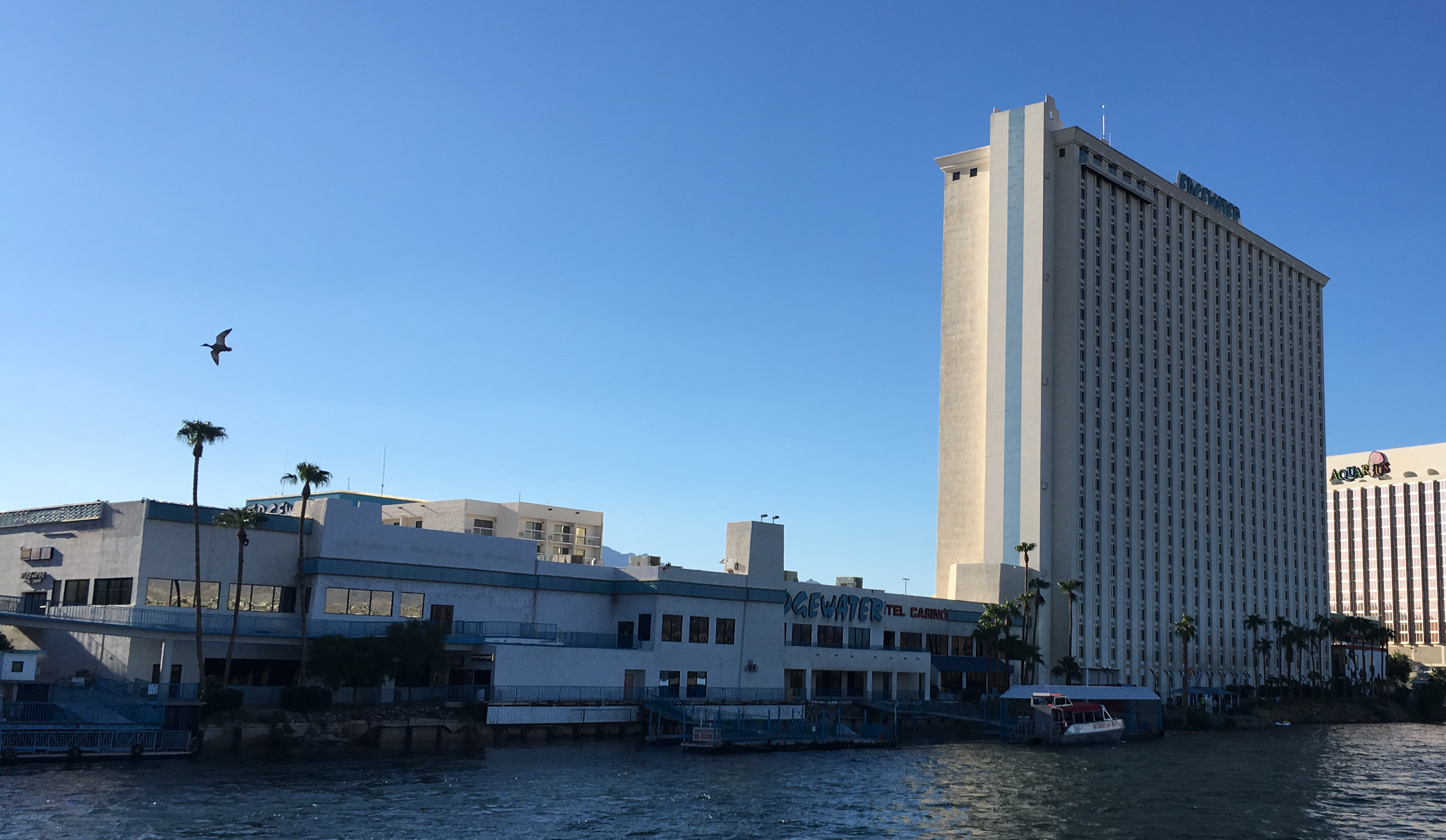
- The property as seen from the Colorado River in 2018
- Interactive map of Edgewater Hotel and Casino
- Location: Laughlin, Nevada, U.S.; 2020 South Casino Drive
- Opened: 1981; 45 years ago
- No. of rooms: 1,053
- Gaming space: 57,457 sq ft (5,337.9 m^{2})
- Owner: Vici Properties
- Operating license holder: Golden Entertainment
- Renovated in: 1998, 1999, 2004, 2012
- Website: edgewater-casino.com

The Edgewater Hotel and Casino is a casino hotel on the banks of the Colorado River in Laughlin, Nevada. It is owned by Vici Properties and operated by Golden Entertainment.

== Facilities ==
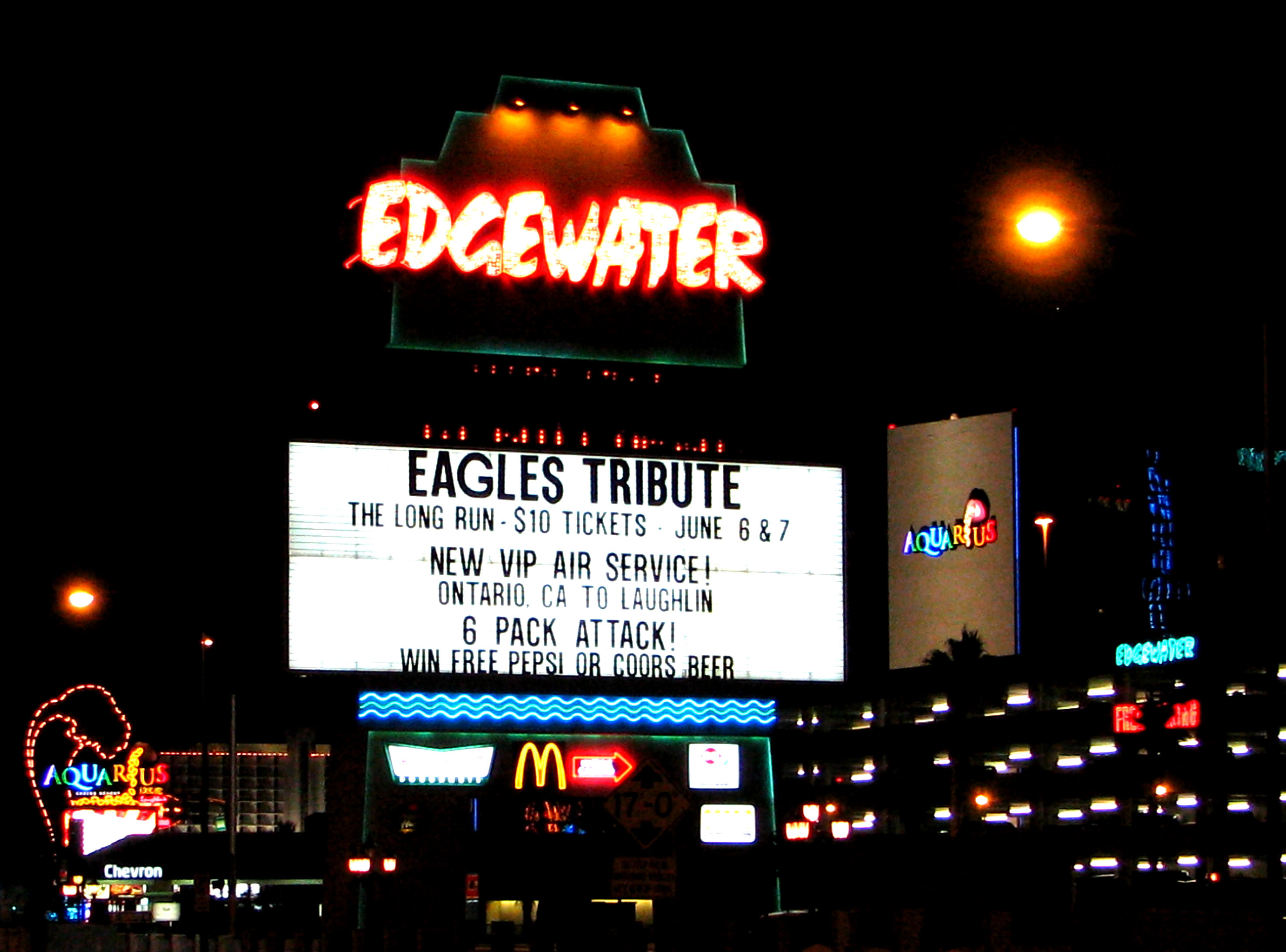
The property's marquee sign in 2008

The hotel has 1,053 rooms divided between two towers: a large 26-story tower, Sedona, and a smaller 6-story tower, Santa Fe. The property has a casino with 57,457 sq ft (5,337.9 m^{2}) of gaming space. There is also a pool and spa, as well as several restaurants.

== History ==
The Edgewater opened in 1981. It initially ran into licensing difficulties when the Nevada Gaming Control Board raised concerns about alleged connections between some partners in the ownership group and members of the Detroit crime family; the rest of the group was forced to buy out their shares.

Circus Circus Enterprises bought the Edgewater in 1983 for $17 million.

Circus Circus was later renamed as Mandalay Resort Group, and was then acquired in 2005 by MGM Mirage. In June 2007, MGM Mirage sold the Edgewater and the Colorado Belle to a partnership of Anthony Marnell III and Sher Gaming for a total of $200 million.

On February 3, 2010, a speeding vehicle crashed into the Edgewater Casino's south entrance, destroying six banks of slot machines and killing two casino patrons and injuring eight. Investigators said that the crash was caused by the driver having a "medical episode".

In January 2019, Golden Entertainment, the owner of the neighboring Aquarius Casino Resort, bought the Edgewater and the Colorado Belle from Marnell and Sher for a total of $190 million. In 2026, Vici Properties acquired the real estate of the Edgewater and leased it back to Golden Entertainment, as part of Golden's going-private transaction.

=== Gaming ===
The Edgewater has 57,457 square feet (5,337.9 m^{2}) of gaming space with 755 slot machines, 0 table games, and a race and sports book (Laughlin's largest).
