= William Pennington (businessman) =

American businessman (1923–2011)

- Born: William Norman Pennington; March 24, 1923; Lebanon, Kansas, U.S.
- Died: May 15, 2011 (aged 88); Reno, Nevada, U.S.
- Occupation: Businessman

William Norman Pennington (March 24, 1923 – May 15, 2011) was an American casino industry executive. A pioneer in Nevada's casino industry, he played a major role in establishing the Circus Circus company, including Excalibur Hotel Casino, Luxor and Mandalay Bay. He owned several properties in Las Vegas, Reno, Hawaii and elsewhere. For many years he was listed on the Forbes 400.
