= Rock in Rio USA =

Music festival in Las Vegas, Nevada

- Genre: Rock, pop, indie, heavy metal
- Location: Las Vegas
- Years active: 2015

Rock in Rio USA was a music festival held in Las Vegas, Nevada from May 8–9 and 15–16, 2015 at the MGM Resorts Festival Grounds on the Las Vegas Strip in Paradise, Nevada.

The event was conceived as an American version of Rio de Janeiro's Rock in Rio festival, and was a partnership between SFX Entertainment, Eike Batista's IMX, MGM Resorts International, Yucaipa Companies, and Cirque du Soleil Entertainment Group. The event was hosted at a new open-air venue neighboring the then MGM-owned Circus Circus Las Vegas, which was developed by the consortium. It shared a similar format to its Brazilian counterpart, with plans to host at least 120 acts across two weekends oriented towards rock music and pop music respectively.

Rock in Rio USA reached a short-term deal to host the event in Las Vegas biennially from 2015 through at least 2019, and planned to expand to a three-day format in 2017. However, after attendance and revenue from the 2015 edition were below expectations, plans for future editions of the event were quietly shelved.

== Development ==
In November 2013, SFX Entertainment, an electronic dance music events company founded by Robert F.X. Sillerman, reached a deal with Roberto Medina, organizer of the Rock in Rio festival series, to acquire a 50% stake in a new entity that would own the rock music festival alongside Eike Batista's IMX, with SFX replacing IMX as the managing partner of the festival. Sillerman also disclosed that plans were being made to bring the festival to the United States for the first time ever. Medina revealed further information about these plans in an interview with Billboard shortly after the deal was reached. He stated that the inaugural festival was to be held in Las Vegas in May 2015, at a site in proximity to the Las Vegas Strip. Medina touted that in comparison to other, U.S.-based festivals, Rock in Rio USA was going to be "bigger in terms of public, in terms of sponsorship, in terms of social media. Not a little bit bigger, a lot bigger."

On March 20, 2014, Rock in Rio USA was officially announced, to be held in May 2015. For its inaugural year, it would consist of four days of performances held across two weekends, with plans to expand to six days on subsequent editions. In April 2014, further details were announced; on April 22, 2014, it was announced that Rock in Rio would partner with MGM Resorts International, Cirque du Soleil, and Ron Burkle's Yucaipa Companies to construct a 33-acre open-air multi-purpose venue on the Strip near Circus Circus as its site. While the festival itself would not have any direct ownership stake in the venue, it contributed resources to its development, and secured a long-term deal to hold Rock in Rio USA at the venue biennially from 2015 to 2019. Additionally, Yucaipa Companies and Cirque each acquired a 20% equity stake in a subsidiary that would own Rock in Rio USA; Rock in Rio CEO Louis Justo explained that the involvement of Cirque du Soleil was oriented more towards their knowledge of the Las Vegas market and its consumers, rather than their creative works. At least $30 million was spent on marketing, including partnerships with Clear Channel Communications and National CineMedia.

== Venue ==
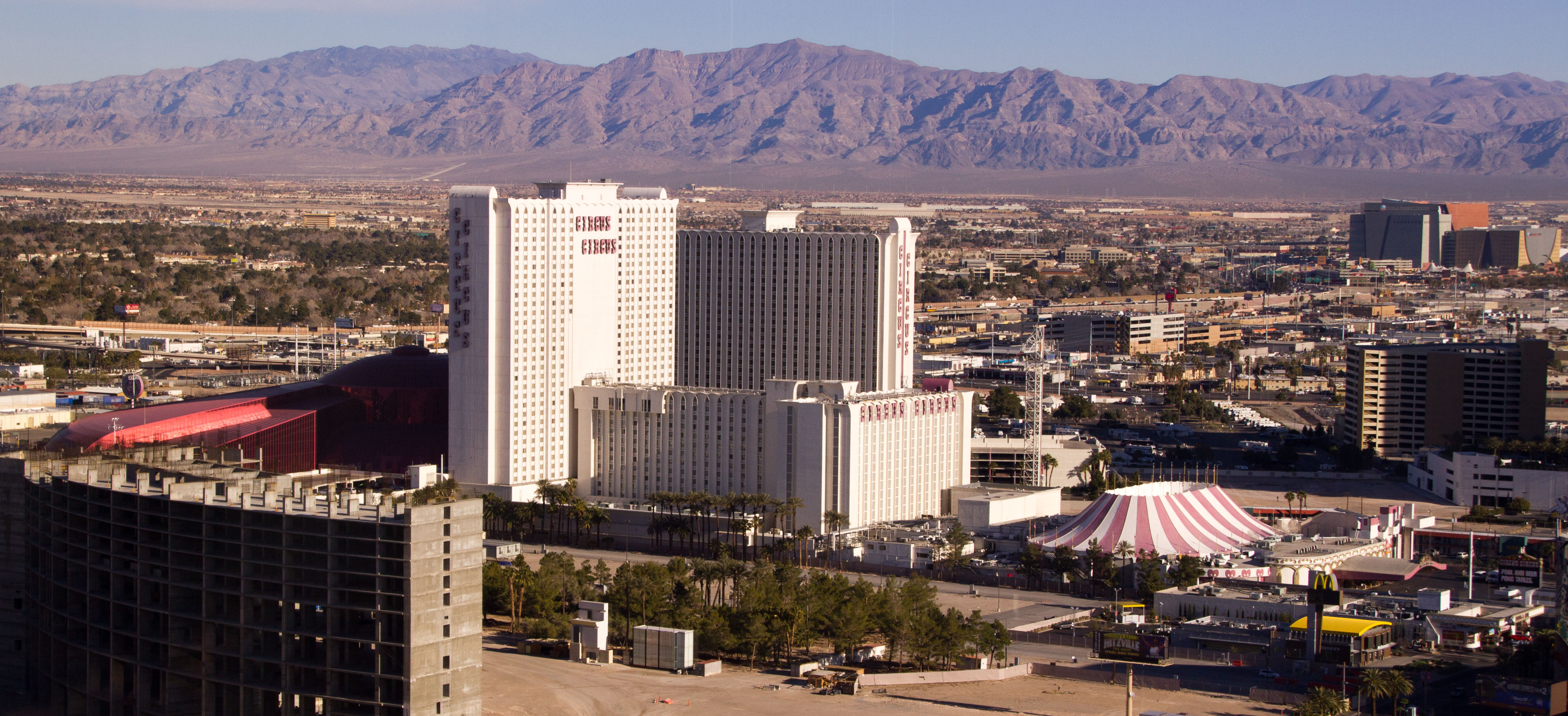
Circus Circus Las Vegas, a casino near the site of the Las Vegas Festival Grounds

Rock in Rio USA was held at the Las Vegas Festival Grounds, a 33-acre (13 ha), open-air venue with a capacity of 80,000, located on Sahara Avenue near the MGM-owned Circus Circus Las Vegas hotel and casino. It was owned by the MGM/Yucaipa/Cirque consortium, who collectively spent $20 million on its development. Rock in Rio organizers collaborated with MGM and Yucaipa on the design of the venue to ensure a "very premium festival experience", stating that it would have an amusement park-inspired layout with five stages (including dedicated stages for indie and electronic music acts), rides (such as a roulette-themed ferris wheel and a zipline), shopping, and themed food courts.

== Lineup ==
=== 2015 ===
For its inaugural edition, the festival featured a lineup of at least 120 acts; the first weekend's lineup was oriented towards rock music, while the second was more pop-oriented. Owing to its increasing prominence in the festival (especially under SFX ownership), electronic music acts were featured on a dedicated stage; additionally, plans were disclosed for a nightly feature where an EDM act would "fly" from the main stage to the EDM stage, and transform the venue into a "360-degree nightclub" to close each night.

The first artists for the 2015 lineup were revealed on September 26, 2014, at an event in New York City, including the Deftones, Jessie J, John Legend, Linkin Park, No Doubt, Metallica, and Taylor Swift.

- Friday, May 8
  - Main Stage: No Doubt, Maná, The Pretty Reckless, Smallpools, Cirque du Soleil
  - Mercedes-Benz Evolution Stage: Foster the People, Gary Clark Jr., Theophilus London, Saints of Valory
  - EDM Stage: AN21, Ftampa, Wax Motif, MVTH
- Saturday, May 9
  - Main Stage: Metallica, Linkin Park, Rise Against, Hollywood Undead
  - Mercedes-Benz Evolution Stage: Deftones, Sepultura featuring Steve Vai, Coheed & Cambria, Of Mice & Men
  - EDM Stage: Alok, Caked Up, The Gaslamp Killer, Felguk
- Friday, May 15
  - Main Stage: Taylor Swift (1989 World Tour), Ed Sheeran, Echosmith, Ivete Sangalo
  - Mercedes-Benz Evolution Stage: Jessie J, Charli XCX, Tove Lo, James Bay
  - EDM Stage: Heidi Lawden, Valida, Jeniluv, Whitney Fierce
- Saturday, May 16
  - Main Stage: Bruno Mars, John Legend, Empire of the Sun, Big Sean
  - Mercedes-Benz Evolution Stage: Joss Stone, Magic!, Mayer Hawthorne, Mikky Ekko
  - EDM Stage: DJ Vibe, Lovefingers, Renato Ratier, Behrouz

== Aftermath ==
Rock in Rio's attendance was lower than expected; only 140,000 attended in total, less than the 328,000 estimated prior to the event. As such, stakeholders doubted that the festival would return for 2017.

In February 2016, SFX Entertainment filed for bankruptcy, and was reorganized under new leadership as LiveStyle in December. In May 2018, Live Nation Entertainment acquired a majority stake in Rock in Rio, including from SFX's creditor committee.

In December 2019, MGM Resorts sold the Circus Circus resort and the Las Vegas Festival Grounds to Phil Ruffin.

== See also ==
- List of music festivals
