= Canyon Blaster =

Canyon Blaster may refer to the following:

- Canyon Blaster (Adventuredome), a roller coaster at the Adventuredome theme park in Las Vegas, Nevada
- Canyon Blaster (Great Escape), a family roller coaster at Great Escape theme park in Queensbury, New York
- Canyon Blaster (Six Flags Magic Mountain), a family roller coaster at Six Flags Magic Mountain in Valencia, California
