= Las Vegas Festival Grounds =

Open-air venue in Winchester, Nevada, United States

- Location in Nevada Location in the United States Location in North America
- Interactive map of Las Vegas Festival Grounds
- Former names: MGM Resorts Festival Grounds (2015)
- Address: 311 West Sahara Avenue
- Location: Winchester, Nevada, U.S.
- Coordinates: 36.1424°N 115.1603°W
- Owner: Phil Ruffin
- Capacity: 85,000
- Acreage: 37 acres (15 ha)

Construction
- Groundbreaking: September 2014; 12 years ago
- Opened: May 8, 2015; 11 years ago
- Cost: $20 million
- General contractor: Martin-Harris Construction

Website
- Venue website

The Las Vegas Festival Grounds is an open-air venue on the Las Vegas Strip in Winchester, Nevada, United States. It was developed by MGM Resorts International and hosted its first event on May 8, 2015. It is 37 acres (15 ha) and has a capacity of 85,000 people. It is located at the north end of the Strip, north of Circus Circus Las Vegas. In 2019, MGM sold the venue to Phil Ruffin.

== History ==
From 1941 to the 1970s, the El Rancho Vegas occupied most of the land. In 2007, MGM Mirage (later MGM Resorts International) purchased the 26-acre (11 ha) El Rancho site from Gordon Gaming for $444 million. MGM purchased other nearby acreage as well.

In 2014, MGM announced plans to develop the site as an outdoor music venue in partnership with Cirque du Soleil and Ron Burkle's Yucaipa Companies. The project was primarily designed to serve as the site of Rock in Rio USA, a new biennial music festival. The venue was initially referred to as the City of Rock, named after its equivalent in Rio de Janeiro, the site of the original Brazilian version of the Rock in Rio festival. The name was soon changed to the MGM Resorts Festival Grounds. MGM hoped to position the grounds as a site for festivals, concerts, and sporting events (such as boxing, mixed martial arts, and soccer) as a complement to its other venues in the area.

The festival grounds made its debut on May 8, 2015, with the Rock in Rio USA festival. Development costs for the site totaled $20 million. The Festival Grounds cover 37 acres (15 ha), and the site has capacity for up to 85,000 people.

In October 2015, the MGM Resorts branding was dropped and the site was renamed to simply Las Vegas Festival Grounds. The renaming was part of an effort to downplay MGM's role in the venue to improve its marketability for third-party events and to brand the site as being part of Las Vegas's "community".

MGM sold the property to Phil Ruffin, along with the neighboring Circus Circus hotel and casino, in 2019.

== Events ==
The Rock in Rio USA music festival was held at the venue in May 2015, headlined by No Doubt, Metallica, Taylor Swift, and Bruno Mars. The festival was intended to be held biennially, but after disappointing ticket sales, plans for future editions of the event were quietly shelved.

In April 2016, the Las Vegas Festival Grounds hosted the ACM Party For a Cause Festival on the weekend preceding the Academy of Country Music Awards.

In 2018, the iHeartRadio Music Festival relocated its Daytime Village stage to the Las Vegas Festival Grounds, moving from the Las Vegas Village.

On November 1–3, 2019, the Festival Grounds held a music festival called Day N Vegas, which featured performances from rap and hip-hop artists. Major headliners included J. Cole, Migos, Tyler, The Creator and Kendrick Lamar. The festival was organized by Goldenvoice, known for organizing the Coachella Festival. The following month, it hosted the inaugural Intersect Music Festival, organized and sponsored by Amazon Web Services.

The Festival Grounds hosted the heavy equipment exhibition of the 2020 Conexpo-Con/Agg held at the Las Vegas Convention Center, due to the construction of expansions to the facility.

On October 22–23 and 29, 2022, the When We Were Young festival was scheduled. The opening day was cancelled the day of the event due to high winds. The When We Were Young festival was held in 2023, 2024, and 2025. In February 2026, organizers announced that When We Were Young would take a hiatus that year and return to Las Vegas in October 2027.

The Sick New World Festival featuring rock and metal bands was held at the Festival Grounds in 2023 and 2024. The 2025 edition was cancelled due to "unforeseen circumstances". The festival returned to the grounds on April 25, 2026, with System of a Down and Korn among the performers.
