= Rim Runner =

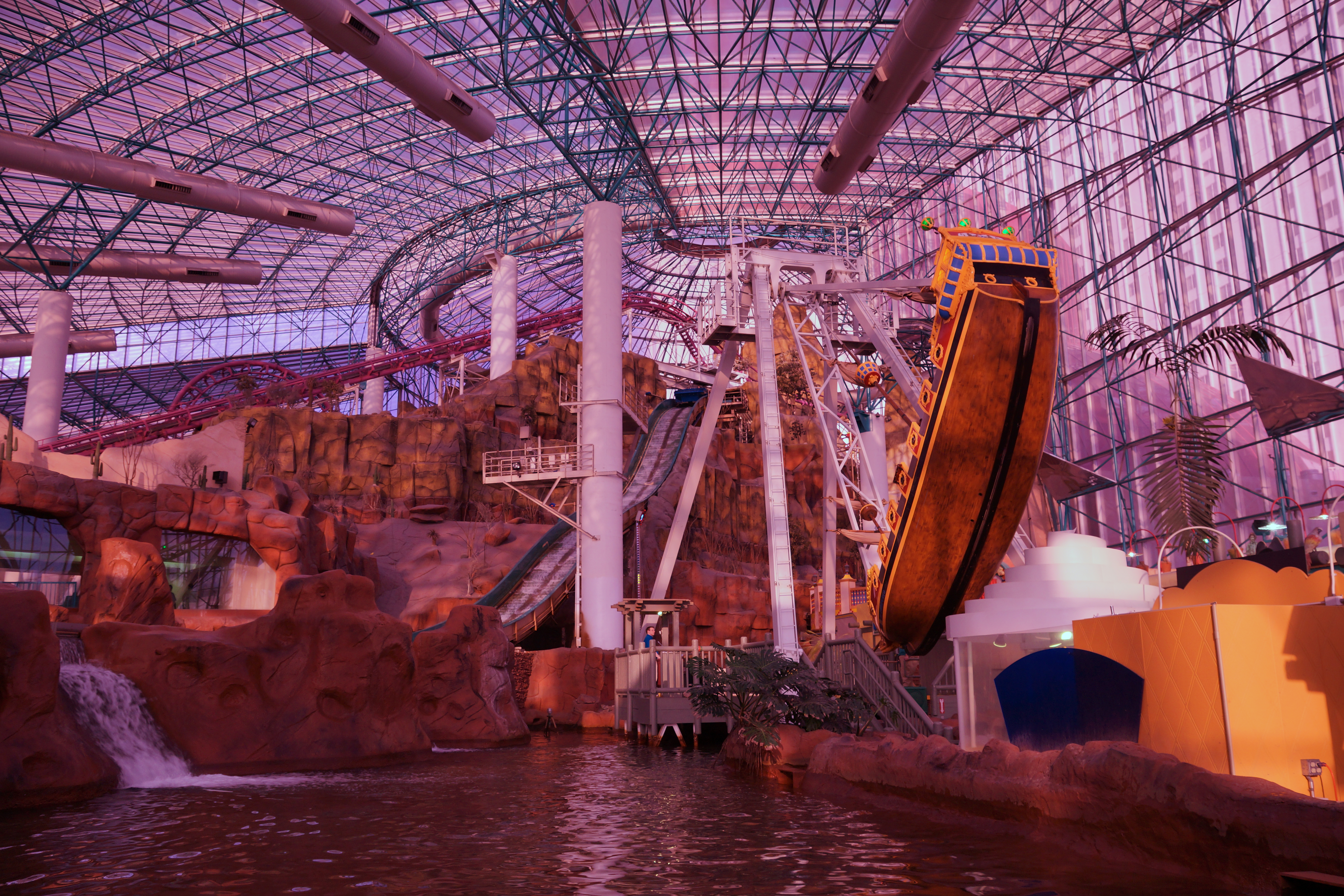

Adventuredome
- Status: Removed
- Opening date: 1993
- Closing date: February 3, 2013
- Replaced by: El Loco

General statistics
- Type: Shoot the Chute
- Manufacturer: Arrow Dynamics
- Height: 65 ft (20 m)
- Drop: 60 ft (18 m)

Rim Runner was an Arrow Dynamics Shoot-the-Chutes located at Adventuredome theme park at Circus Circus Las Vegas and was one of the world's longest and tallest indoor water flume rides with a height of 65 feet and a drop of 60 feet. The ride ceased operation on February 3, 2013 to make way for El Loco which opened in February 2014.

== Ride layout ==
Riders boarded on the second level of the park. Each boat held up to 15 passengers in three rows of five secured by a single-position lap bar that spanned each row. Once dispatched, conveyor belts moved the boat into the water.

The boat slowed as it entered a "lake" area and made a right turn. The water was at its deepest point at this point, approximately 12 feet, as this was the main reservoir for the ride. Another set of conveyor belts lifted the boat out of the water, into a tunnel and onto the one and only chain lift for the ride. As riders ascended the dimly lit cavern, pin points of light that look like eyes flicker. During the annual Halloween event, Fright Dome, special music and extra decoration filled the lift tunnel.

At the top, there was a slight drop-off the chain as the boat heads toward the drop. An animatronic "falling rock" teetered close to the boat. This area was once filled with an extremely dense layer of mist, to obscure riders' vision of what lies ahead. At this point, the Canyon Blaster was mere feet above the heads of Rim Runner passengers. Another set of conveyor belts positioned the boat for its final plunge, an 80-foot camelback drop to a wet conclusion. A final right-hand turn placed the boat at the final set of conveyor belts that lifted the boat out of the water and back into the station.

== Changes ==
When the attraction first opened riders were soaked during the final plunge and splashdown. The large wave created would hit the bridge that spans the runout, getting onlookers wet as well. However, due to complaints an acrylic glass wall was soon added to the bridge to keep the upper level dry. This area is now home to numerous arcade-style video games.

In addition to the wet spectators, passengers began to complain that the ride was simply too wet for the climate-controlled theme park. During the first few years of operations several remedies were tried by making adjustments to the boats themselves. At one point they even kept one boat in the original configuration calling it the "soak boat" and the modified one the "sprinkle boat". Eventually all the boats were modified to minimize the amount of water hitting the riders.

Over the years the boats have had other changes as well. Complaints about injuries sustained when the boat impacted the runout at the bottom of the drop were common during the first few years. First management put up a higher height requirement for the front row before eventually blocking off the front row entirely. Next, the back row was blocked off presumably to "balance" the boat (although not until some time later). The result is now a boat designed for 20 to 25 passengers fitting a maximum of 12.

Rim Runner officially closed to the public on Sunday, February 3, 2013 to make room for El Loco. The boat storage area, lift hill & trough leading to the drop still remain standing.

== See also ==
- 2013 in amusement parks
