= Jay Sarno =

American businessman

- Born: July 2, 1922; St. Joseph, Missouri, U.S.
- Died: July 21, 1984 (aged 62); Paradise, Nevada, U.S.
- Education: University of Missouri
- Occupation: Entrepreneur
- Years active: 1958–1984

Jay Sarno (July 2, 1922 – July 21, 1984) was an American developer, hotelier, and casino owner. He developed and owned the Atlanta Cabana Motel in Atlanta, Georgia, as well as several motels in California and Texas. He was the founder of the Caesars Palace and Circus Circus hotels in Las Vegas.

== Early life ==
Sarno was born in 1922 in St. Joseph, Missouri. His parents were Jewish immigrants from Poland. His father was a cabinet maker, his mother a homemaker.

Sarno graduated from the University of Missouri, with a degree in business. While in college, he met Stanley Mallin, who would become his lifelong friend and business partner.

During World War II, he served in the United States Army in the Pacific Theater of Operations alongside Mallin.

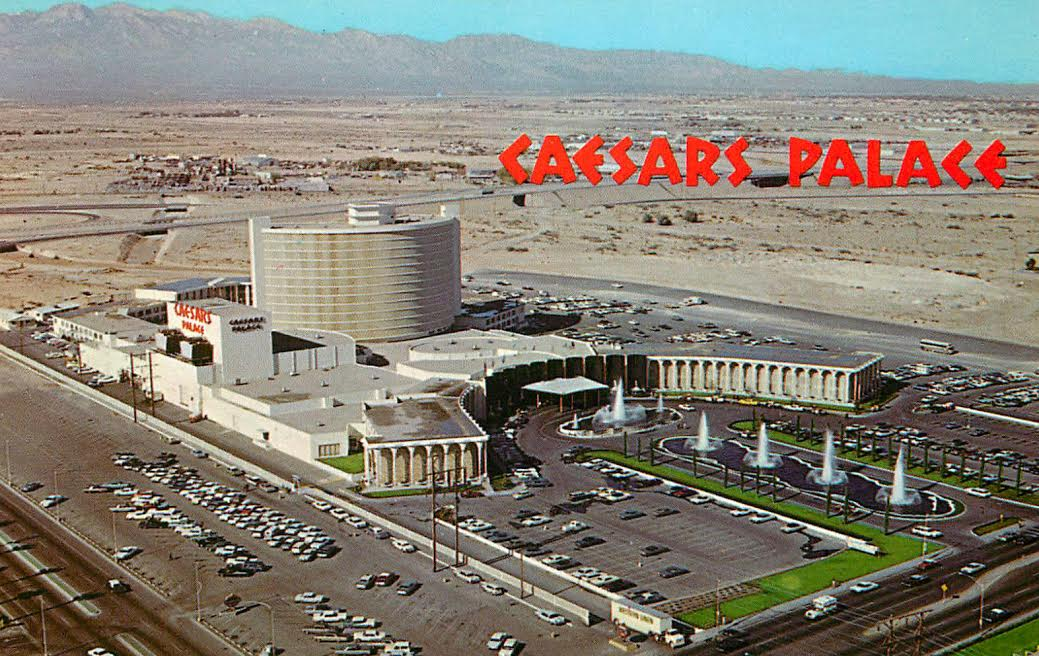
Caesars Palace in Las Vegas, developed by Jay Sarno.

== Career ==
With Stanley Mallin, Sarno became a tile contractor in Miami, Florida. They subsequently built subsidized housing in Atlanta, Georgia. In 1958, after they had met Jimmy Hoffa and Allen Dorfman, they built the Atlanta Cabana Motel with a loan from the Central States Pension Fund. They went on to build Cabanas in Palo Alto, California and another motel in Dallas.

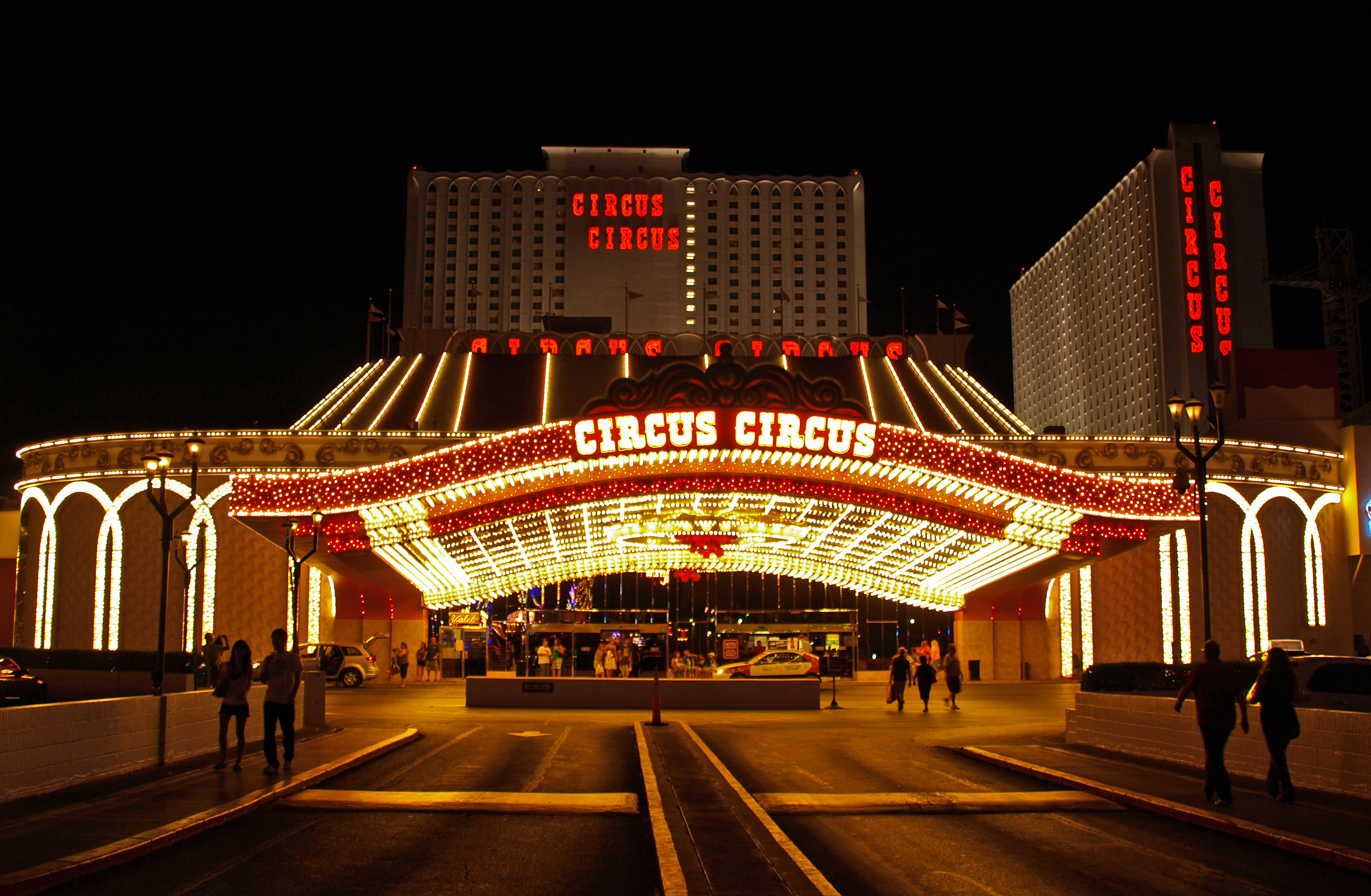
The Circus Circus in Las Vegas, Nevada, developed by Jay Sarno.

Sarno developed the Caesars Palace Hotel in Las Vegas. It was inaugurated on August 5, 1966.

Sarno later built Circus Circus. The attraction featured a circus tent with daily acts and Sarno would dress up as a ringmaster and attend to families and children personally. Sarno subsequently leased it to Bill Pennington and Bill Bennett, a Del Webb executive, and they purchased it in 1983.

Sarno planned to develop Grandissimo, a hotel and casino with 6,000 rooms. However, the project was shelved when Sarno died.

== Personal life ==
Sarno married Joyce Sarno Keys but they later divorced. They had four children.

== Death and legacy ==
Sarno died of a heart attack on July 21, 1984, at the age of 62, at Caesars Palace.

Sarno was posthumously elected to the Gaming Hall of Fame in 1989. He received, also posthumously, the inaugural Sarno Award for Casino Design from the Global Gaming Expo in 2003.

== Filmography ==
- Diamonds Are Forever (1971) - Sideshow Barker (uncredited)
