= Atlanta Cabana Motel =

Former motor hotel in Georgia, United States

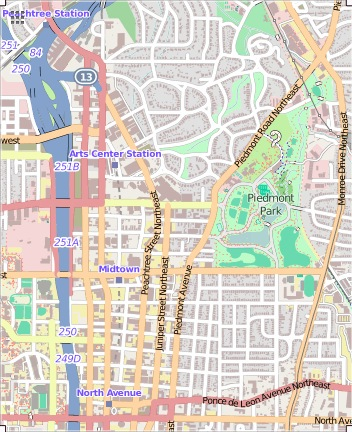
- Location within Atlanta Midtown

General information
- Location: 870 Peachtree St. NE (SW corner Peachtree and 7th), Midtown Atlanta
- Coordinates: 33.7782°N 84.3846°W
- Opening: 1958
- Closed: 2002
- Owner: Teamsters Union

Technical details
- Floor count: 5

Design and construction
- Developer: Jay Sarno

Other information
- Number of rooms: ca. 200

The Atlanta Cabana Motel was a 200-room motor hotel located at the southwest corner of Peachtree Street and 7th Street in Midtown Atlanta. It opened in 1958 and was razed in 2002; the site is now occupied by the 28-floor Spire residential tower. The Cabana was Atlanta's first major new hotel in 30 years as well as a pioneer in the concept of motor hotels, that is, motel-like facilities in cities, as opposed to alongside highways between cities. It was recognized as a prime example of modern motor hotel architecture.

It was one of many flashy hotels developed by casino mogul Jay Sarno, who also developed Caesars Palace. Jay Sarno and Stanley Mallin met Jimmy Hoffa. The union leader liked Sarno and Mallin's willingness to become successful businessmen, and he introduced Sarno and Mallin to Allen Dorfman, who loaned Sarno and his friend money allowing them to open the Atlanta Cabana Motel.

== Design ==
Georgia Tech architecture grad Jo Harris was the interior designer helping realize Sarno's vision of rococo modernism, decorating the complex with fountains, statues and mirrors. At ground level, a curvilinear flow of lounge, restaurant and ballrooms lined the motor court and pool, while a modern "L-configuration" of balconies allowed for ample people-watching. The design was influenced by architect Morris Lapidus's early '50s Miami hotels such as the Fontainebleau Miami Beach and Eden Roc. Large forms and bright colors dominated. A monolithic seven-story turquoise tile wall facing Peachtree Street, complemented by a zig-zag carport, served as a billboard for the car culture redefining Atlanta's main street in that epoch. Today's kitsch was the opulence of that era. The motor hotel was a symbol of Peachtree's transformation from a stuffy boulevard of the mansions of the old elite, to a modern American car-oriented boulevard.

The King's Inn restaurant operated at the motor hotel.

== Civil Rights Era ==
In 1962 while visiting Atlanta to give a concert for 5000 people at the city auditorium, Harry Belafonte and his troupe were denied service at the motel's King's Inn restaurant, which was leased out and not under the motel's management; the motel manager invited the group into his office for a private luncheon. That same year, the Cabana was sued for denying accommodation to black NAACP delegates during the Civil Rights Movement.

== Later years ==
In 1971 actress Doris Day, part owner of the motor hotel, accused her two business partners, Stanley Mallin and Jay Sarno, of mismanagements. She accused them of paying themselves at least more than $240,000 than they were entitled to between 1961 and 1969. Day claimed she received only $11,783 during the same period for her 13.7% interest, while company records showed payments to Day totaling $21,268.

In 1982 the hotel was a Howard Johnson. In 1986 the hotel was named the Cabaña.

Over the decades the Cabana deteriorated, finally becoming a Quality Inn. A plan by Stang & Newdow around the turn of the 21st century to renovate the Cabana into a boutique hotel was unsuccessful. The Cabana was razed to make way for the Spire.

== See also ==
- Hotels in Atlanta
- List of motels
