= Circus Circus Las Vegas =

Hotel and casino in Winchester, Nevada

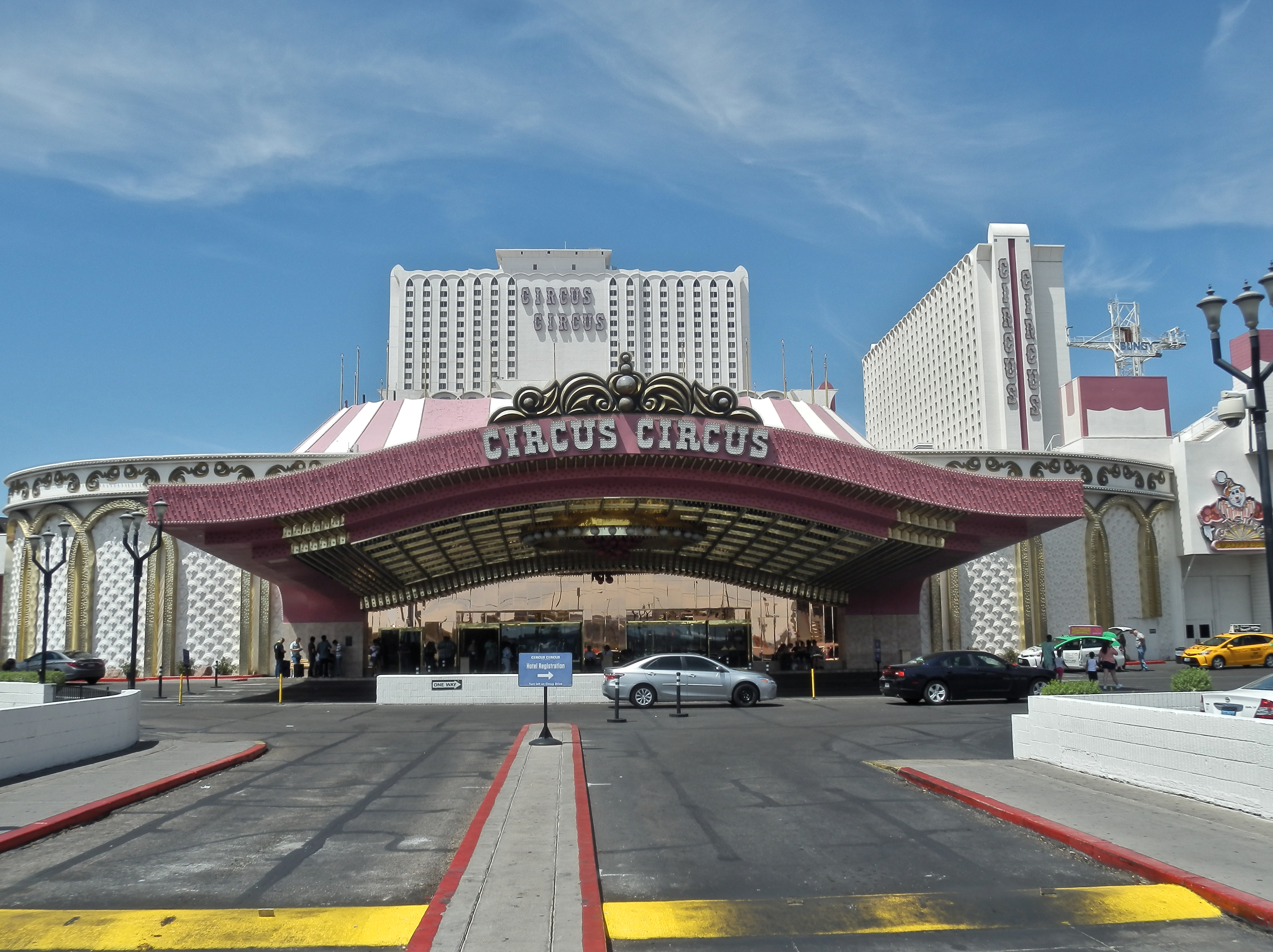
- Circus Circus Las Vegas in 2018

- Location within Las Vegas Strip Location within Nevada
- Interactive map of Circus Circus Las Vegas
- Location: Winchester, Nevada, U.S.; 2880 South Las Vegas Boulevard; 36°08′13″N 115°09′48″W
- Opened: October 18, 1968; 57 years ago
- Theme: Circus
- No. of rooms: 3,767
- Gaming space: 123,928 sq ft (11,513.3 m^{2})
- Permanent shows: Circus acts
- Signature attractions: Adventuredome; Carnival Midway; Slots-A-Fun Casino; Splash Zone
- Notable restaurants: Auntie Anne's; Circus Buffet; Burger King; Einstein Bros. Bagels; Pick Up Stix; Popeyes; The Steak House
- Owner: Phil Ruffin
- Architect: Rissman and Rissman Associates
- Renovated in: 1972, 1975, 1980, 1981, 1982, 1985–86, 1993, 1996–97, 2014, 2017, 2020–23
- Website: circuscircus.com

Circus Circus Las Vegas is a hotel and casino located on the northern Las Vegas Strip in Winchester, Nevada. It is owned and operated by Phil Ruffin. Circus Circus includes the largest permanent circus in the world. It features circus and trapeze acts, as well as carnival games, at its Carnival Midway. The resort also includes the Adventuredome, an indoor amusement park.

Circus Circus was originally owned by Jay Sarno and Stanley Mallin. It opened without a hotel on October 18, 1968. It included a casino on its first floor, while a second floor contained carnival games for children. Circus Circus was among the first family-oriented casinos in Las Vegas. It struggled financially during its early years, in part because of its lack of a hotel. A 15-story tower, with 409 rooms, was added in 1972. Sarno and Mallin were subsequently investigated for tax code violations and alleged connections with organized crime.

In 1974, the casino was leased to Bill Bennett and William Pennington, taking over operations from Sarno and Mallin. The property thrived under its new management. Another 15-story tower was added in 1975, followed by an RV park in 1979. A year later, Circus Circus added a series of motel structures, increasing the total room count to 1,610. Bennett and Pennington eventually purchased Circus Circus in 1983 and added a 29-story tower in 1986. The amusement park was added in 1993, and a 35-story tower was completed three years later. The casino contains 123,928 sq ft (11,513.3 m^{2}), while the hotel has 3,767 rooms. The Circus Circus property also includes the small Slots-A-Fun Casino, which Sarno opened in 1971.

The resort was owned through Circus Circus Enterprises, which was renamed Mandalay Resort Group in 1999. The resort was sold to MGM Mirage (later MGM Resorts International) in 2005. MGM intended to renovate and expand Circus Circus, but canceled such plans amid the Great Recession. Fifty years after its opening, Circus Circus remained popular among families. In 2019, MGM sold Circus Circus to Las Vegas casino owner Phil Ruffin. At the time, the resort included the only RV park on the Las Vegas Strip.

== History ==
Circus Circus was originally owned by Jay Sarno and Stanley Mallin. Explaining the casino's double name, Sarno said, "At first I planned a Roman circus motif, but changed my mind and decided to build a circus like we are all familiar with – instead of a Roman circus, it's a circus circus." A circus-themed casino was a departure from Sarno's previous Las Vegas resort, the luxurious Caesars Palace. Sarno called Circus Circus "the most exciting project of my life".

Planning for Circus Circus was underway at the end of 1967, and the opening was initially planned for August 1, 1968. The Nevada Gaming Control Board gave preliminary approval for Circus Circus, but this was overturned by the Nevada Gaming Commission, which noted that Sarno's group had only 70 percent of the necessary funds to finance the project. Approval was granted after a $1.1 million loan was provided by relatives of Kirk Kerkorian.

Circus Circus was designed by the California firm of Rissman and Rissman Associates. The general contractor was R. C. Johnson and Associates, of Las Vegas. Circus Circus was built on the Las Vegas Strip, across from the Riviera resort, on property next to the Westward Ho motel. The opening was eventually delayed to October 1, 1968. The Circus Circus owners had $4.2 million to cover the construction costs, and R. C. Johnson estimated the project to cost $3.9 million. However, work was sped up during the final month to get the casino opened sooner, resulting in a higher construction cost. The casino included a circus tent structure, made of steel and concrete. The tent-shaped roof reached 90 feet in the air, and was made of a plexiglass material which was painted white and hot pink.

=== Opening and financial problems ===
The $15 million Circus Circus ultimately opened on the night of October 18, 1968. An invitational costume party preceded the public opening. The opening was attended by numerous government officials and film stars, as well as media from across the United States. Nevada governor Paul Laxalt declared a "Circus Circus Premiere Week" to mark the opening.

Circus Circus had 1,000 employees. Sarno served as the casino's president, and held a 25-percent interest, while Jud McIntosh held 22 percent. The two-story building included an indoor balcony that overlooked the casino floor. Various high wire and trapeze acts took place over the casino, but Sarno said that such acts would not distract the gamblers below. The property also featured female shoeshiners in skimpy clothing. Sarno had wanted the trapeze artists and shoeshiners to be topless, an idea that was vetoed by the gaming commission. Other attractions in the casino, however, were allowed to feature topless women. The second floor included a midway with various carnival games for children. Circus Circus was among the first family-oriented casinos in Las Vegas, along with the Hacienda.

The casino featured costumed table dealers and cocktail waitresses, as well as small, pink elephants that could be ridden. Several trained monkeys roamed the casino as well and interacted with guests, for instance by paying out jackpot winnings. In addition, an elephant named Tanya was trained to pull slot machine handles and toss dice with her trunk. According to some accounts, a short-lived publicity stunt involved baby elephants that were transported around the casino via an overhead tram, giving the illusion that they were flying. The property also included an all-you-can-eat dessert experience known as the Diet Buster.

Circus Circus attracted 26,000 people within its first eight hours of opening. However, it would struggle financially during its early years. It was mocked and criticized by skeptics, who doubted the idea of a circus-themed casino. Gamblers were put off by the many distractions, including the trapeze artists and other performers. Howard Hughes, who owned several Las Vegas casinos, believed that Circus Circus did not fit in with the upscale resorts on the Las Vegas Strip. Mallin later said Circus Circus was "ahead of its time" and acknowledged that it was not well received in its early years.

By the end of 1968, Circus Circus owed more than $1 million in construction debt, which led to rumors about its finances. Casino management stated that it was performing satisfactorily, and that the debt was the result of certain construction work being disputed, due to concerns about whether such work was ever authorized. Circus Circus alleged $271,000 in unauthorized construction work by R. C. Johnson. The Nevada Gaming Commission declined to issue a permanent gaming license to Circus Circus until its debt was paid off, giving the casino one month to do so. In addition, Circus Circus charged a $1 admission fee, and the gaming commission determined on short notice that the casino had to pay $30,000 in taxes on the fees. The casino filed a lawsuit against the state to oppose the tax. The admission fee was one reason that Circus Circus struggled, and it was eventually dropped.

The gaming commission granted several extensions, allowing the casino to continue operating on a temporary license. In April 1969, the gaming commission voted to let the Circus Circus gaming license expire at the end of the month, after the discovery of secret loans that were made to the casino but not reported to the state. Hours before the scheduled closure, the commission extended the license for another month. This came after Sarno resigned as president and put his ownership stake into a trust until it could be sold. Mallin was chosen to serve as the new president. A permanent gaming license was granted in May 1969, and planning was underway for more than $500,000 in improvements. In January 1970, the Nevada Gaming Commission approved Sarno to return as the operator of Circus Circus.

The casino was unable to attract high rollers, due to its lack of a hotel. In 1971, the Teamsters' Union pension fund provided a loan to Circus Circus to pay off debts and to add a hotel. A 15-story tower opened in July 1972. As part of the loan arrangement, the Chicago Outfit's enforcer, Anthony Spilotro (under the name of Tony Stuart), was granted a gift shop concession in the hotel. In addition to a government investigation into the organized-crime connections, Sarno and Mallin were also being investigated for tax code violations. The casino's financial problems also continued, and Sarno began discussions to bring in a new casino operator.

=== Ownership changes and later years ===
In April 1974, William Bennett and William Pennington were approved by the state as new operators of the casino. They leased Circus Circus from Sarno and Mallin, who remained as landlords for several years. Bennett and Pennington had been searching for a financially challenged Las Vegas casino that they could take over. They originally considered the Landmark, before settling on Circus Circus. Bennett was initially skeptical that a family friendly casino could succeed in Las Vegas. However, he and Pennington quickly turned Circus Circus into a profitable venture. Under their management, the casino contained mostly slot machines, and did not cater to big gamblers. Although the casino was mocked for its theme, it had wide appeal among the middle-class demographic. Various additions were made over the years, including an RV park in 1979, followed by motel structures the next year.

Bennett said in 1981, "I don't believe kids and gambling mix. If I had to start over, I would not use this concept. We end up being babysitters for the town, which is fine, but we have a lot of problems because of all the kids around. We have more security wandering the floors than most hotels." Bennett and Pennington operated the property through Circo Resorts, Inc, which would later become Circus Circus Enterprises. In their lease, they had an option to buy Circus Circus from Sarno, which they eventually did in 1983. By that point, Circus Circus was one of the most successful casinos in the state.

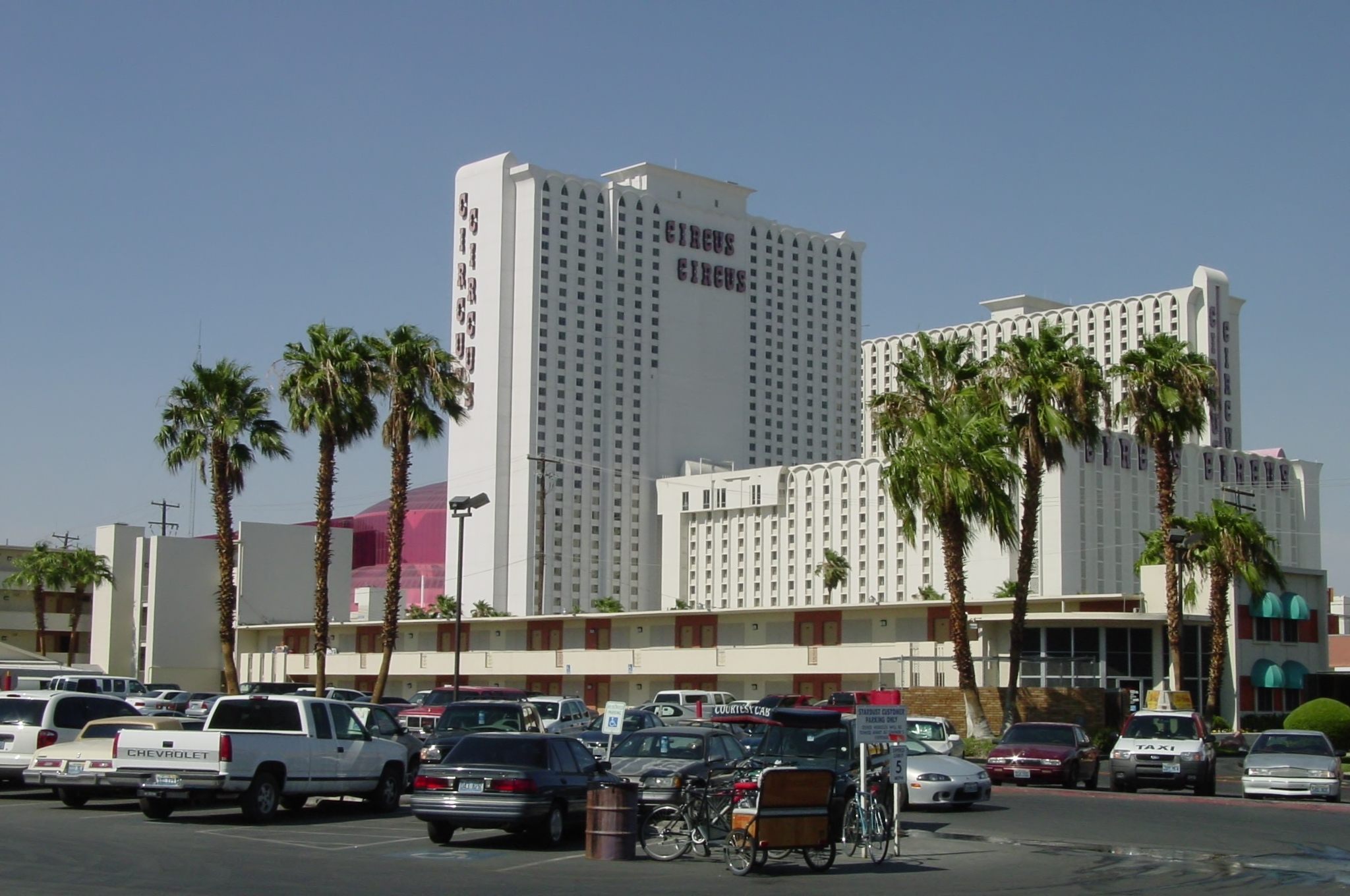
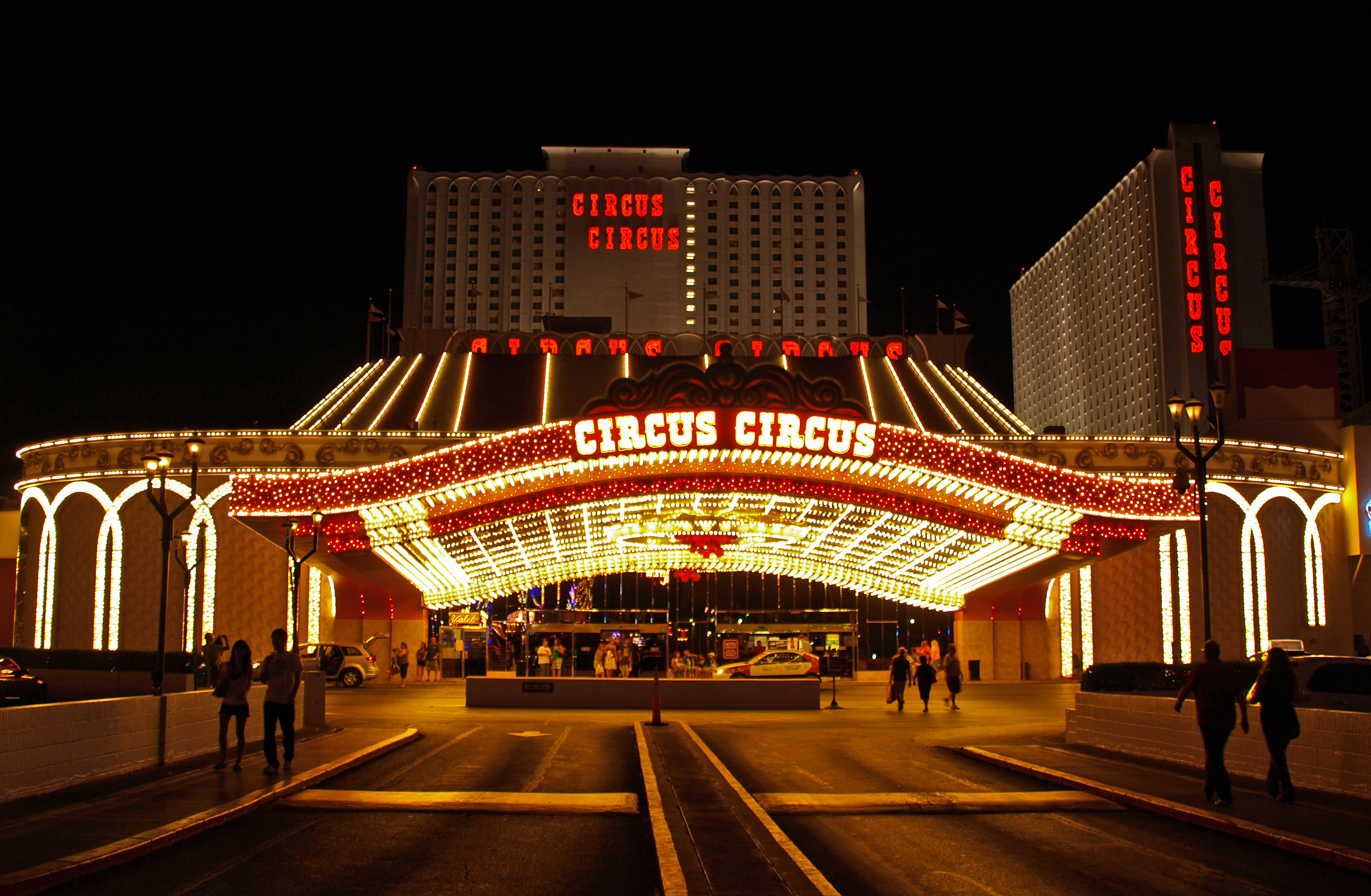
Circus Circus in the 2000s, with its 35-story West Tower seen in the center

A 29-story hotel tower was added in 1986, followed by the Adventuredome amusement park in 1993. A 35-story tower was added during renovations in 1996, part of an effort to bring in new customers. Circus Circus officials also hoped to retain the resort's core demographic: young families and retirees searching for bargains.

Circus Circus Enterprises was renamed as Mandalay Resort Group in 1999. MGM Mirage (later MGM Resorts International) bought out Mandalay Resort Group in 2005, and acquired Circus Circus as a result. In 2007, the company planned to build a multibillion-dollar resort on newly acquired property north of Circus Circus, where the El Rancho Vegas once stood. The Circus Circus motel structures and RV park were to be demolished to accommodate the new project, and the remaining structures would be renovated and expanded. However, MGM's plans were canceled due to the financial impact of the Great Recession. The El Rancho land was later used as the site of MGM's Festival Grounds, which opened in 2015.

Out of 10 resorts on the Las Vegas Strip, Circus Circus was MGM's most popular property among Hispanic tourists. Fifty years after its opening, Circus Circus remained popular among families, although the aging facility was in need of renovations, including new carpeting and exterior paint. Circus Circus was the oldest Las Vegas property owned by MGM Resorts. Although 50 years is a long lifespan for Las Vegas casinos, the anniversary went uncelebrated.

In 2019, MGM Resorts International sold Circus Circus to Phil Ruffin, owner of the Treasure Island Hotel and Casino, for $825 million. The sale included the Festival Grounds. Like previous owners, Ruffin continued to operate Circus Circus as a budget property. He began a $30 million renovation project focusing on various parts of the resort, with work extending into 2023.

Early on, Ruffin had planned to build a 2,000-seat theater in front of Circus Circus at a cost of $11 million. He also intended to convert the RV park into a swimming pool complex with a wave machine, sand beaches and a lazy river ride. As of 2026, these features have yet to be built.

In January 2025, Ruffin stated that he was planning to sell Circus Circus in order to acquire another property on the Las Vegas Strip or elsewhere. Circus Circus and the Festival Grounds make up a total of 102 acres and could sell for up to $5 billion.

== Features ==
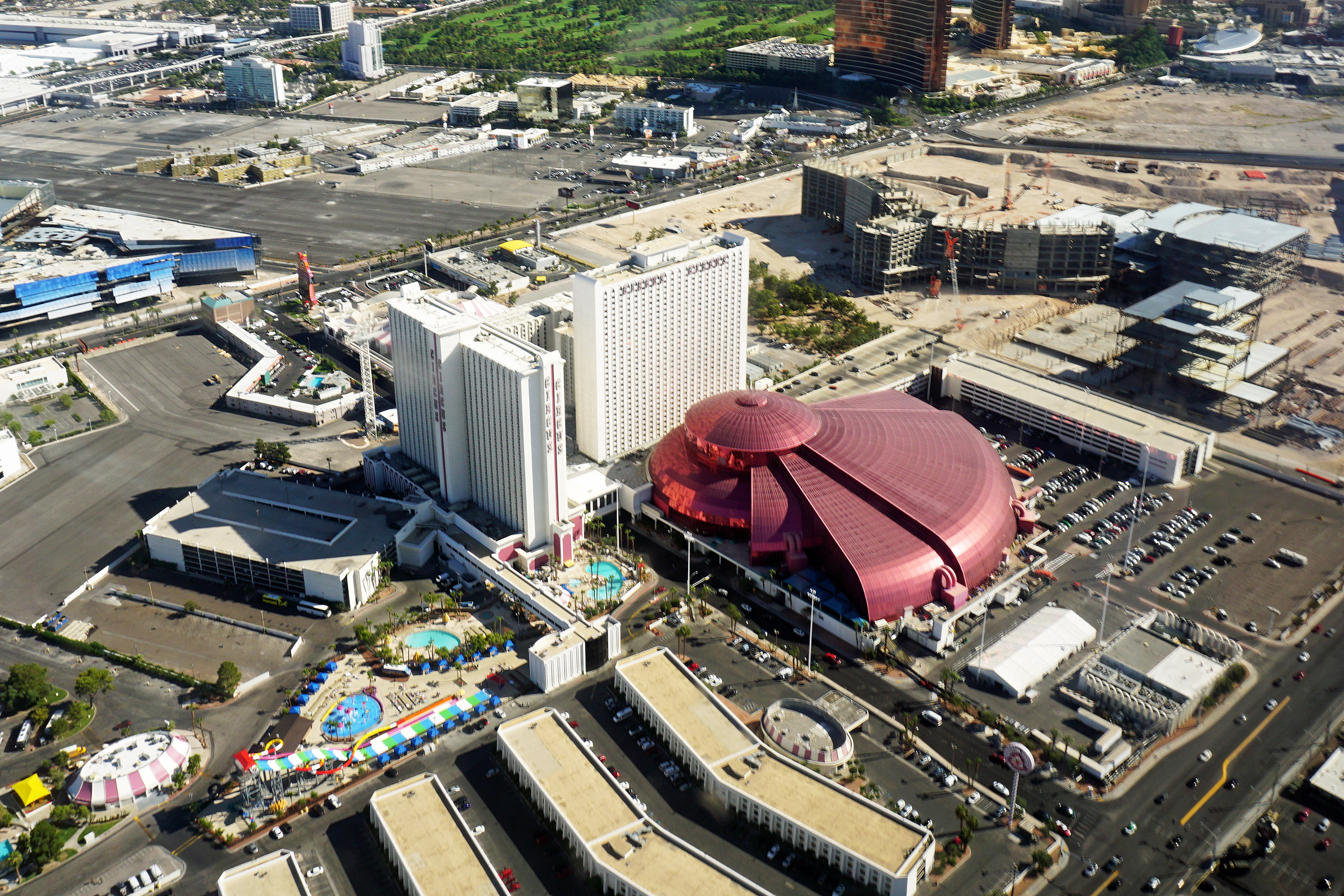
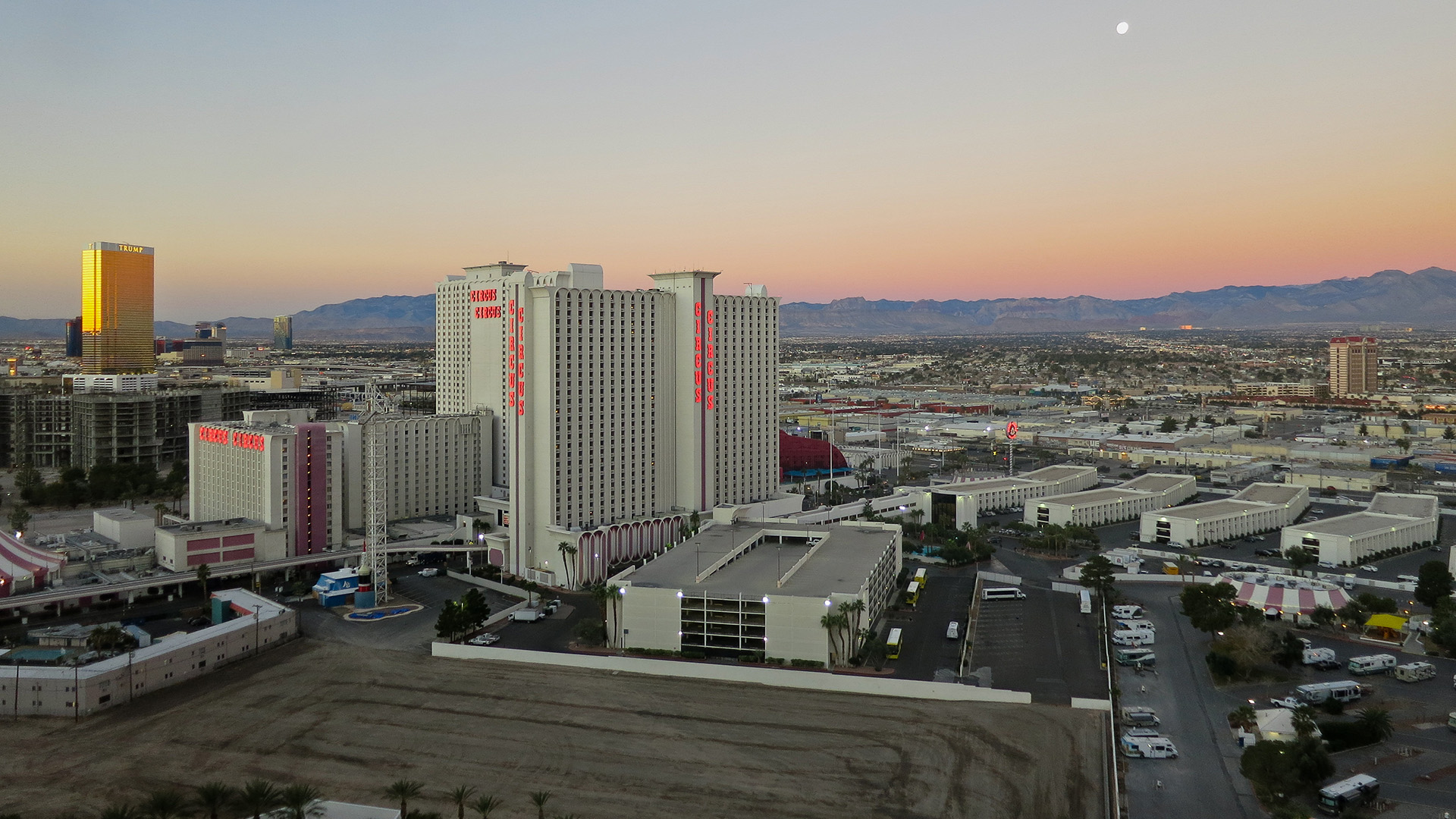
Circus Circus facilities in the 2010s

Circus Circus has 123,928 sq ft (11,513.3 m^{2}) of casino space, and 3,767 hotel rooms. When it opened, the casino originally had 19 blackjack tables, two roulette wheels, eight crap tables, and 686 slot machines.

The front exterior of the casino originally had various features which were eventually removed. A 306-foot-long fountain area marked the front, and some of the fountains could shoot water four stories high, while illuminating the water in a series of colors. Las Vegas artist Montyne was hired to sculpt several statues, which also stood in front of Circus Circus. A carousel was also located in front of the casino.

In its early years, Circus Circus included the Hippodrome showroom. It hosted the show Nudes in the Night, which at one point starred Babette Bardot. In 1970, Sarno launched Tom Jones, a topless show based on the eponymous 1963 film. Other shows would include Naked But Nice, Nudes Delight, and Hot Pants Sexplosion. The theater was soon walled off to public access and, as of 2024, has sat vacant for decades.

In 1974, the Guinness Book of World Records named Circus Circus as the world's largest permanent circus, a distinction that it continues to hold. Pink coloring is used throughout the resort. Jo Harris was the original interior designer. She had previously designed Caesars Palace, and would later work with Sarno on other projects. The 1972 hotel tower gave the casino 409 rooms. Another 15-story tower was opened in April 1975, adding an additional 400 rooms, and a convention hall. The two original towers are connected, and are known as the Casino Tower. In the 1970s, the hotel included a two-story Royal Suite, which was designed by Harris and included a balcony. A wedding chapel, known as Chapel of the Fountain, also opened in 1975.

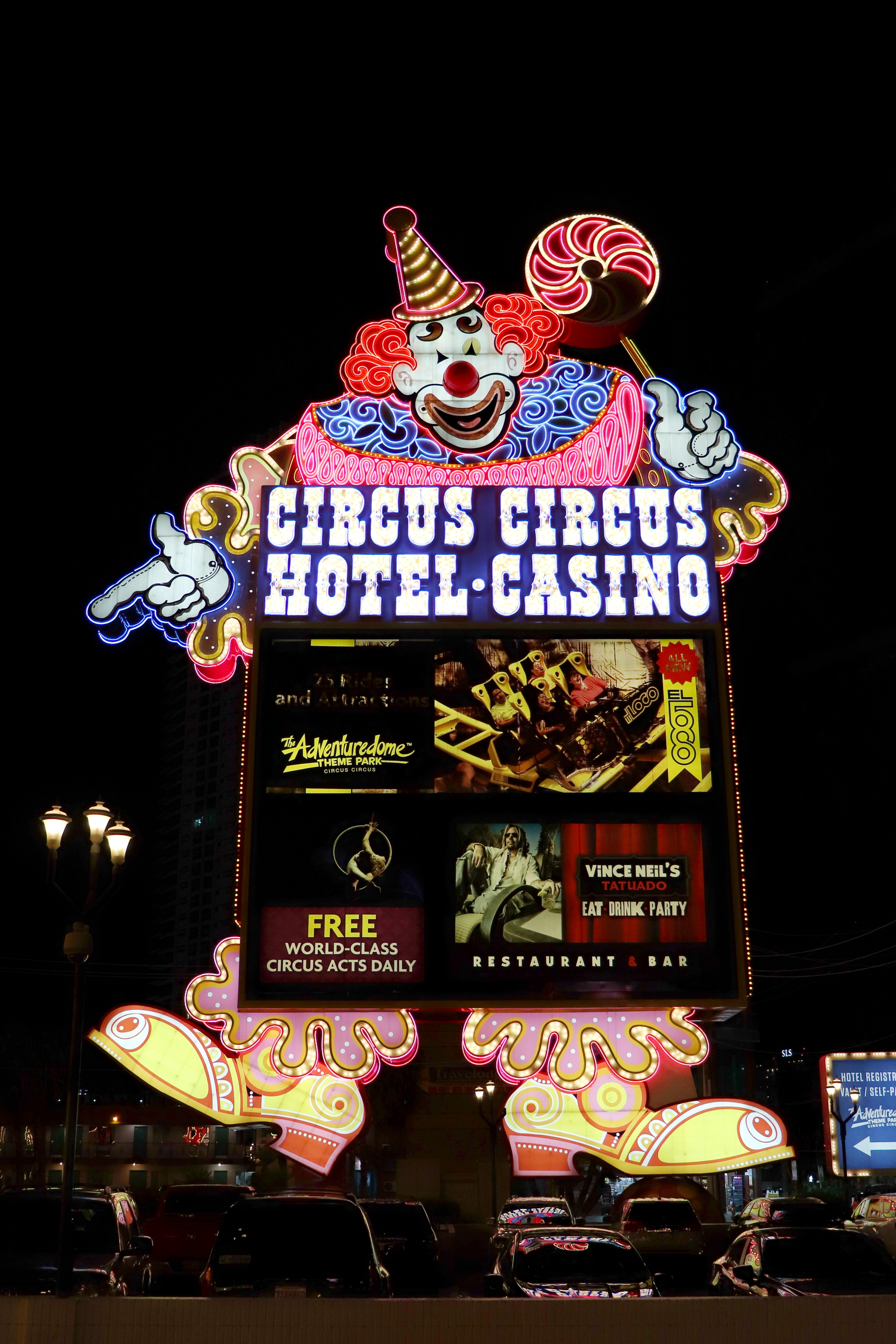
Lucky the Clown neon sign

The Circus Circus carousel was removed in 1976, to make room for the resort's new roadside sign, which stands 123 feet. The neon sign depicts a clown character known as Lucky. It was created by YESCO and is one of the most-photographed signs in Las Vegas. A sportsbook opened In September 1976, but closed seven months later, as management believed that the space could be better utilized through a different purpose.

In 1977, there were plans for an expansion, which would include a parking garage. The 1,000-space garage was completed in 1978, and the Circusland RV Park was added a year later. Circus Circus Manor, which opened in 1980, consists of five, three-story motel buildings with a total of 810 rooms. This brought the resort's overall total to 1,610 hotel rooms.

A monorail, the Circus Sky Shuttle, was added in 1981. It was the first automated transit system in the Las Vegas Valley. The track, located 18 feet above street level, connected the main resort to the Circus Circus Manor rooms. A $7 million renovation and expansion project was underway in 1982, expanding the casino and a video game arcade. A valet parking lot was added in front of the resort, replacing the fountains.

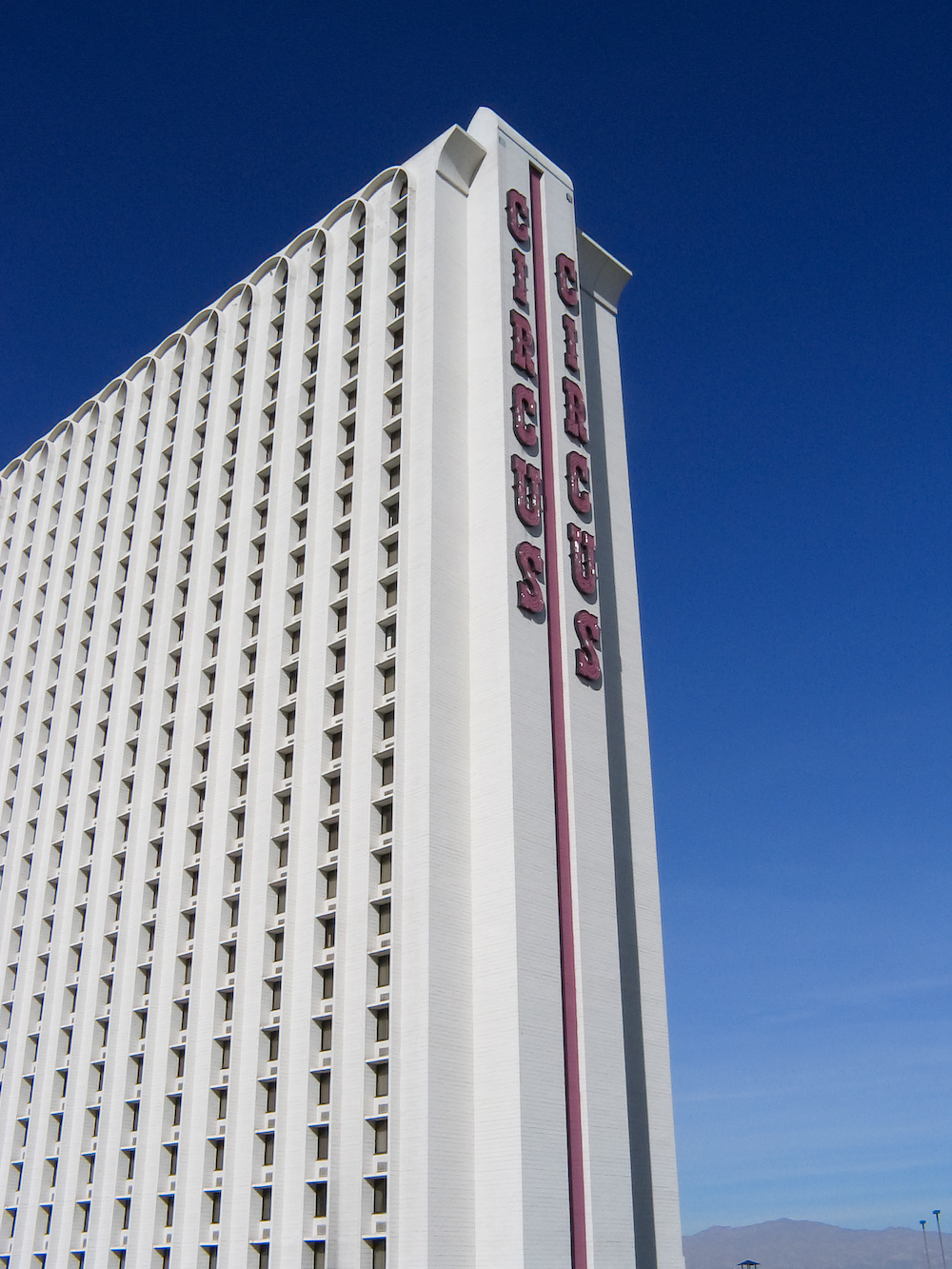
The 29-story Skyrise Tower

Additional casino space and a second parking garage were added in 1985, and construction was underway on the 29-story Circus Skyrise tower, which would add 1,188 rooms for a total of 2,793. It would also include more casino space and a sportsbook, as well as a third parking garage. The general contractor was Marnell Corrao Associates, with Veldon Simpson as the architect. Groundbreaking for the tower took place on January 31, 1985. It was topped off on September 25, 1985, and opened the following year, on property that was previously occupied by the Savoy Motel.

A $100 million renovation began in 1996. It included the December opening of the $60 million, 35-story West Tower. The addition added about 1,000 rooms, for a total of approximately 3,700. The older rooms underwent refurbishment, and a retail area with 14 shops was opened in January 1997. Operations of the monorail were ended around 2000, due to the high cost of maintaining its outdated equipment, although the track remains intact.

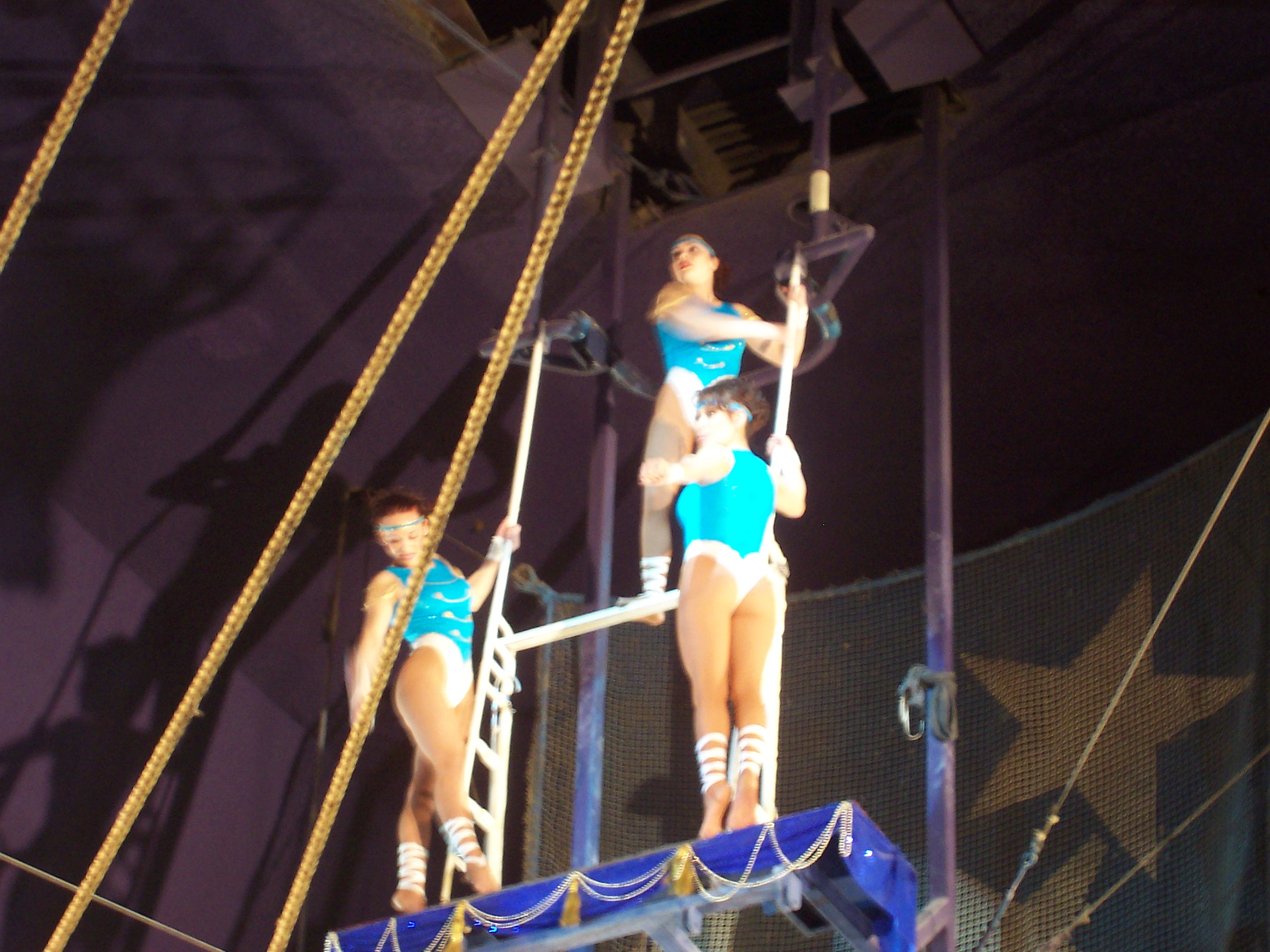
Trapeze artists performing at Circus Circus in 2005

Most of Montyne's statues were disposed of in 2006, under MGM's ownership. The company stated that the statues were in a state of deterioration. In 2012, Circus Circus introduced an exhibit dedicated to the work of animator Chuck Jones.

The Circus Circus midway includes a video game arcade and carnival-type games. It also features clown shows and trapeze acts several times a day. Clowns also roam the rest of the resort to amuse visitors. For decades, the midway featured a carousel that operated as a bar.

The hotel rooms were renovated in 2014. The RV park was also briefly closed and renovated; a portion of it was converted into additional space for MGM's Festival Grounds, leaving the RV park with 170 spaces. It takes up 10 acres, and is the only RV park on the Las Vegas Strip.

In 2017, Circus Circus added the Splash Zone water park for its hotel guests, after several years of planning. By 2022, the pool area had been enlarged as part of Ruffin's $30 million renovation project, which also made minor improvements to the property. This included a $10 million update of the resort's elevators, and a new paint job consisting of bright colors, emphasizing the property's circus theme. The property's faux circus tent structure was also included in the renovation project.

=== Adventuredome ===
The Adventuredome is a 5-acre (2.0 ha) indoor amusement park located within a large pink glass dome, which is connected to Circus Circus. It offers various rides and attractions, including the Canyon Blaster and El Loco roller coasters, as well as midway and arcade games.

Circus Circus added the amusement park in 1993, on property behind the resort. It was originally known as Grand Slam Canyon until 1997.

=== Restaurants ===
Circus Circus includes a popular restaurant known as the Steak House, which has won several awards. It opened in 1982, replacing a spa area. The two main restaurants in the 1990s were the Steak House and a buffet, although an Italian restaurant, Stivali, was added in 1997. The buffet averaged approximately 13,000 diners per day. Readers of the Las Vegas Review-Journal voted the buffet as Las Vegas' worst for seven straight years, starting in 2001. In 2021, a portion of the buffet was replaced with a food court, which includes Dairy Queen, Einstein Bros. Bagels, Pick Up Stix, and Popeyes.

=== Slots-A-Fun Casino ===
Slots-A-Fun logo

Slots-A-Fun Casino is a small casino located on the Circus Circus property. It operates in a separate building along the Las Vegas Strip, directly south of the Circus Circus east entrance. It was opened in August 1971, by Circus Circus owner Jay Sarno replacing a merry-go-round. In 1974, management of the casino was assumed by Ross W. Miller, a former Circus Circus executive (and father of eventual Nevada governor Bob Miller). Miller was reported to be leasing the premises from the Teamsters Union, which had provided some of the financing to develop Circus Circus.

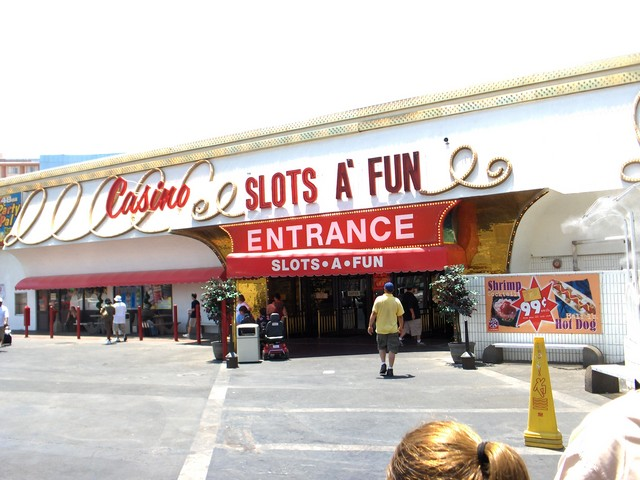
Slots-A-Fun northwest entrance, 2007

In 1975, gaming executive Carl Thomas bought into the casino as an equal partner with Miller, who died later that year. In 1979, however, Thomas was exposed as being involved in casino skimming operations on behalf of the Kansas City mob. Two FBI informants claimed that the mob owned a secret interest in Slots-A-Fun through Allen Dorfman, though that claim was never substantiated. Thomas's gaming licenses were revoked, and he was forced to sell his casino interests.

Miller's estate and Thomas sold Slots-A-Fun to Circus Circus Hotels, Inc., a company owned by Bill Bennett and Bill Pennington, who were the operators of the Circus Circus casino. Their company later became known as Circus Circus Enterprises, and then Mandalay Resort Group. In 1986, a woman accidentally crashed her car into the casino, injuring 14 people.

MGM Mirage (later MGM Resorts International) bought Mandalay Resort Group in 2005, and acquired Slots-A-Fun as part of the purchase. As of 2014, it was one of the last casinos to still offer coin-operated slot machines. Phil Ruffin bought Circus Circus and Slots-A-Fun in 2019. The casino is popular for its low-priced drinks and table games.

== In popular culture ==
In 1969, Circus Circus served as the location for an episode of The Ed Sullivan Show. It also appears in the 1970 film The Grasshopper.

In the 1971 journalistic novel Fear and Loathing in Las Vegas, author Hunter S. Thompson wrote, "The Circus-Circus is what the whole hep world would be doing Saturday night if the Nazis had won the war. This is the sixth Reich. The ground floor is full of gambling tables, like all the other casinos . . . but the place is about four stories high, in the style of a circus tent, and all manner of strange County-Fair/Polish Carnival madness is going on up in this space." When the novel was adapted to film in 1998, the fictional "Bazooko Circus" was featured as a thinly veiled stand-in for Circus Circus, which had refused permission for the filmmakers to shoot on their property.

Circus Circus is a featured location in the 1971 James Bond film, Diamonds Are Forever, which includes key scenes filmed in the casino and midway. Sarno himself has a cameo in the film, and Tanya the elephant is shown doing her slot machine-playing trick. A year later, Circus Circus appeared in an episode of Banacek titled "A Million the Hard Way". It also made appearances in several other films of the 1970s, including Las Vegas Lady, Damnation Alley, and Corvette Summer. The 1999 film Baby Geniuses was partially shot at the Adventuredome, which stood in as the fictional Joyworld theme park.

Circus Circus also appears in a 1998 King of the Hill episode "Next of Shin" as Hank, Dale, and Bill search for Hank's father Cotton in Las Vegas.

In the 2004 video game Grand Theft Auto: San Andreas, Circus Circus appears under the name Clown's Pocket. A recreation of Circus Circus, called the Ringmaster, also appears in the 2014 racing video game The Crew, near the northern end of the Las Vegas Strip.

A robbery occurred at Circus Circus in 1993, when Heather Tallchief, a driver for an armored truck, drove away with $3 million, which was in the process of being distributed to ATMs. Tallchief carried out the robbery with the help of murderer Roberto Solis. They disappeared, but she eventually surrendered 12 years later. The robbery is chronicled in an episode of the 2021 Netflix docuseries Heist.

== See also ==
- Circus Circus Reno
- Circus Circus Tunica
- List of largest hotels
- List of integrated resorts
