= El Loco (Adventuredome) =

Roller coaster in the Adventuredome, Las Vegas, Nevada, U.S.

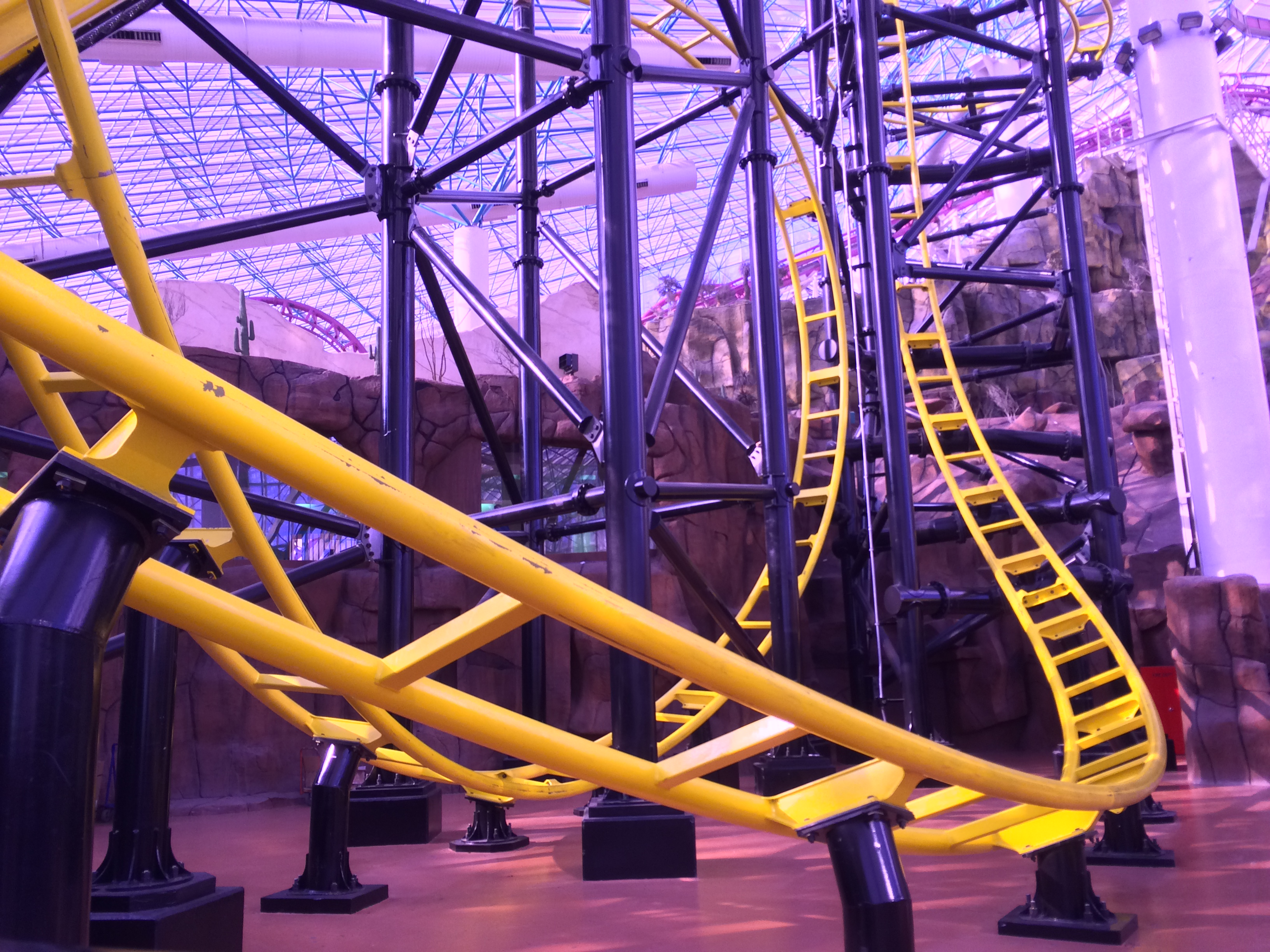

Adventuredome
- Location: Adventuredome
- Coordinates: 36.1375°N 115.1666°W
- Status: Operating
- Opening date: February 18, 2014
- Replaced: Rim Runner

General statistics
- Type: Steel – Indoor
- Manufacturer: S&S – Sansei Technologies
- Height: 90 ft (27 m)
- Length: 1,300 ft (400 m)
- Speed: 45 mph (72 km/h)
- Inversions: 2
- Duration: 1:13
- Max vertical angle: 90°
- Restraint style: Lap bar
- Height restriction: 48 in (122 cm)
- Trains: 6 trains with 2 cars; riders arranged 2 across in a single row for a total of 4 riders per train
- El Loco at RCDB

El Loco is a steel roller coaster in the Adventuredome amusement park at the Circus Circus Las Vegas resort. The coaster shares its name with the El Loco roller coaster model which is built by S&S – Sansei Technologies.

== History ==
El Loco opened on February 18, 2014, as a replacement for the Rim Runner log flume which had been removed in 2013—though El Loco still uses some of the structures of Rim Runner, including the station. Many sources reported that the El Loco at Adventuredome would have a "beyond vertical" first drop, which is typical for El Loco model coasters (some sources reported that the drop would be as steep as 120 degrees). Despite these reports, however, the coaster ultimately only had a 90-degree drop. The coaster is the second El Loco model to be built indoors (after Crazy Bird), as well as being the second El Loco model to be built in the United States (after Steel Hawg). Circus Circus would not project the specific increase in attendance it expected as a result of installing the coaster, but predicted that it would do well.

== Layout ==
Although it is not beyond vertical, many sources note the 90 degree drop on El Loco. The coaster also has a total of two inversions—both dive loops. It is also noteworthy for it sometimes banking toward the outside of turns. Guests ride the coaster in individual four-rider cars containing two rows of two. The cars have speaker systems which play music that was customized for the ride, and is a mix of "energetic hip hop, rock and Latin beats".

== Reception ==
The coaster was rated as one of the ten most anticipated rides for 2014 by USA Today.

== Incidents ==
On March 26, 2019, a woman was reported to have fallen from the coaster. The extent of her injuries and where she fell are still unknown. The woman was reported as a "double amputee", though which limbs were amputated and whether the amputations contributed to the accident is unknown. The coaster reopened in August 2019 with an updated training manual specifying that all riders must have at least one functional hand and arm, and that guests with leg amputations would not be able to ride.
