= Spire (Atlanta) =

Residential skyscraper in Atlanta, Georgia

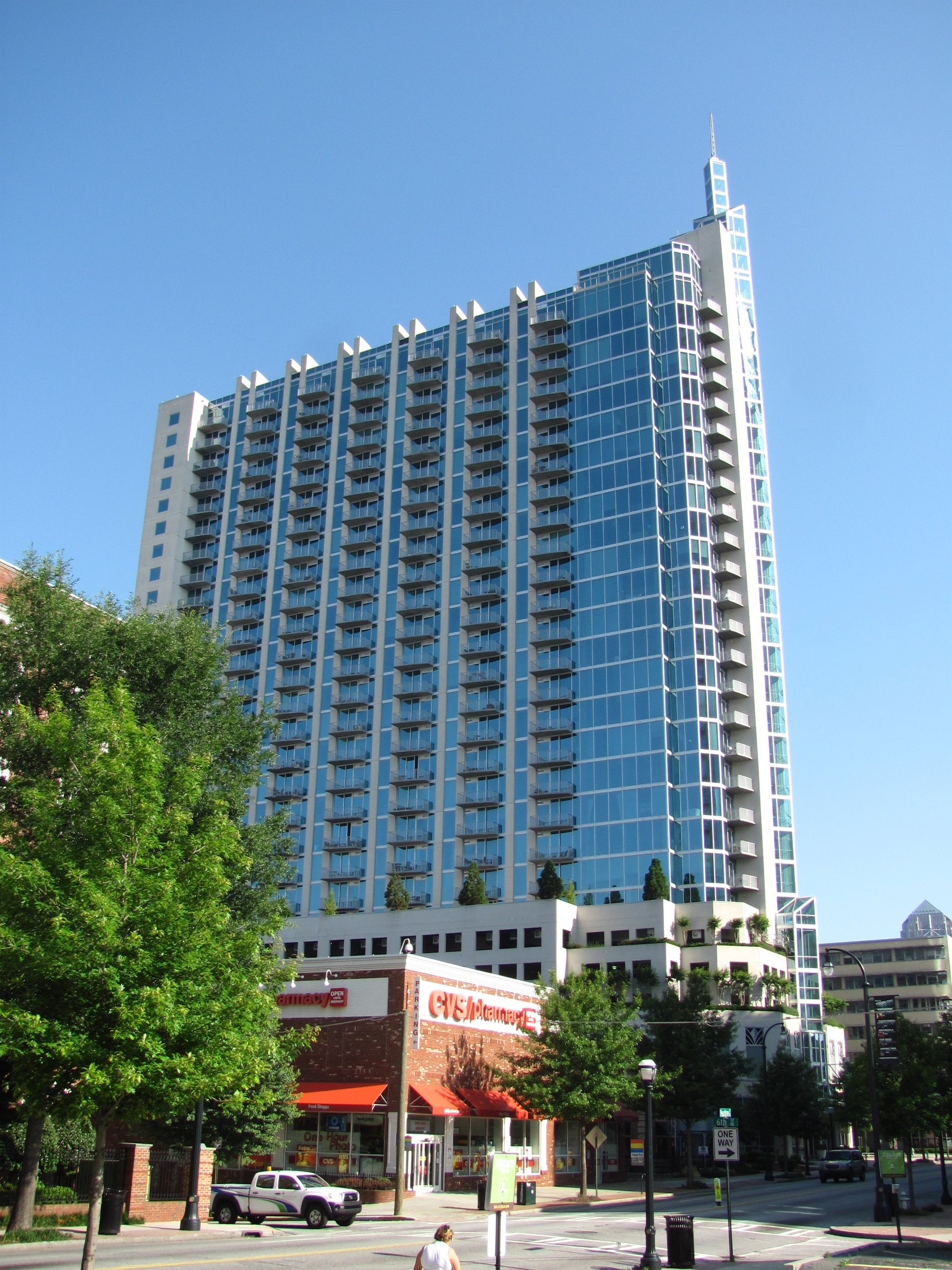
- Spire

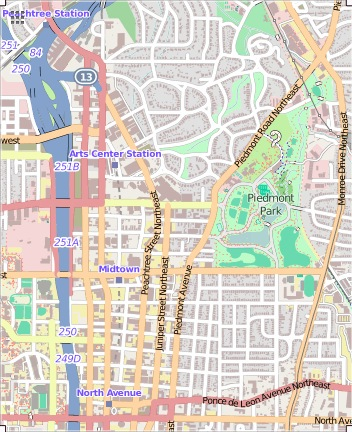
- Location within Atlanta Midtown

General information
- Type: Residential
- Location: 860 Peachtree Street NE, Atlanta, Georgia
- Coordinates: 33.7782°N 84.3846°W
- Construction started: 2004
- Completed: 2005

Height
- Roof: 453 ft (138 m)

Technical details
- Floor count: 28

Spire is a 453 ft (138m) tall skyscraper in Atlanta, Georgia. It was built from 2004 to 2005 on the site of the former Atlanta Cabana Motel. It has 28 floors and is tied with the Equitable Building as the 21st tallest building in the city. The building contains 393 apartment units.

== See also ==
- List of tallest buildings in Atlanta
