= Adventuredome =

Indoor amusement park at Circus Circus in Winchester, Nevada

- Previously known as Grand Slam Canyon (1993–1997)

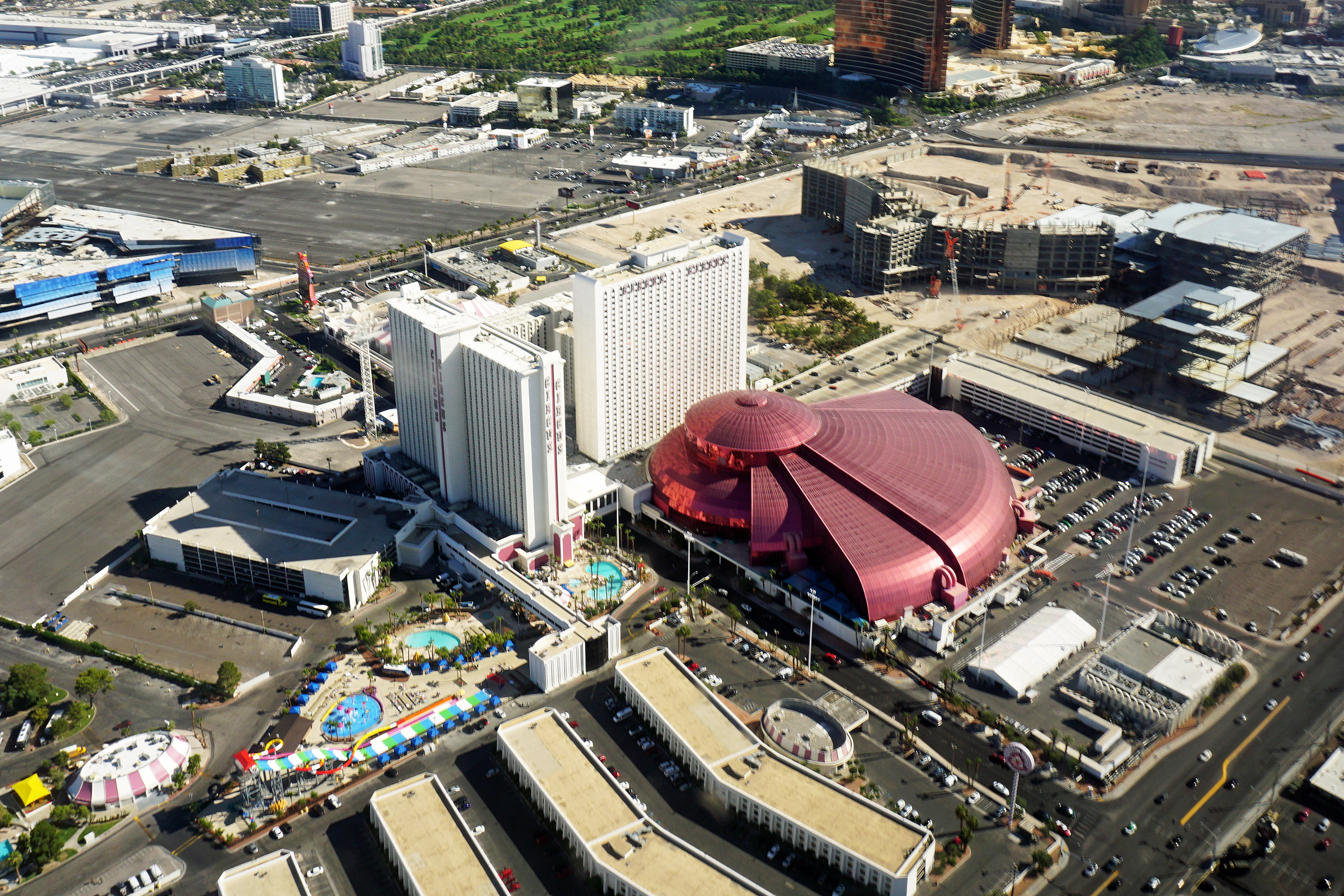
- The pink-colored Adventuredome, part of the Circus Circus property (2017)
- Interactive map of Adventuredome
- Location: Winchester, Nevada, U.S.
- Coordinates: 36°08′16″N 115°09′58″W
- Opened: August 23, 1993; 32 years ago
- Owner: Phil Ruffin
- Slogan: 5 Acres of Indoor Fun!
- Operating season: All year
- Area: 5 acres (2 ha)

Attractions
- Total: 19
- Roller coasters: 2
- Website: www.circuscircus.com/the-adventuredome

Adventuredome (formerly Grand Slam Canyon) is a 5-acre (2 ha) indoor amusement park at Circus Circus in Winchester, Nevada on the Las Vegas Strip. It is owned by Phil Ruffin. It is contained within a large glass dome, and offers various rides and attractions including the Canyon Blaster and El Loco roller coasters, a rock climbing wall, an 18-hole miniature golf course, a video game arcade, and carnival-type games. Because the park is enclosed, it is unaffected by weather, unlike most theme parks, and is open year-round. Every October from 2003 until 2017, the Adventuredome was turned into the Halloween-themed Fright Dome.

The theme park opened as Grand Slam Canyon on August 23, 1993, in the west parking lot of the hotel. It sits on a reinforced 18" thick deck elevated 18 feet (5 m) above ground. The dome itself consists of over 350,000 sq ft (33,000 m^{2}) of pink tinted, insulated glass over a teal green space frame (to minimize structural poles inside). Each pane of glass weighs approximately 300 lb (140 kg). After customer feedback, the park was closed for 45 days in 1994 to add new attractions. Grand Slam Canyon was renamed the Adventuredome in 1997.

Circus Circus Enterprises (later Mandalay Resort Group) initially owned the Adventuredome until 2005, when it was sold to MGM Mirage, which later became MGM Resorts International. Ruffin purchased the resort and theme park in 2019.

== History ==
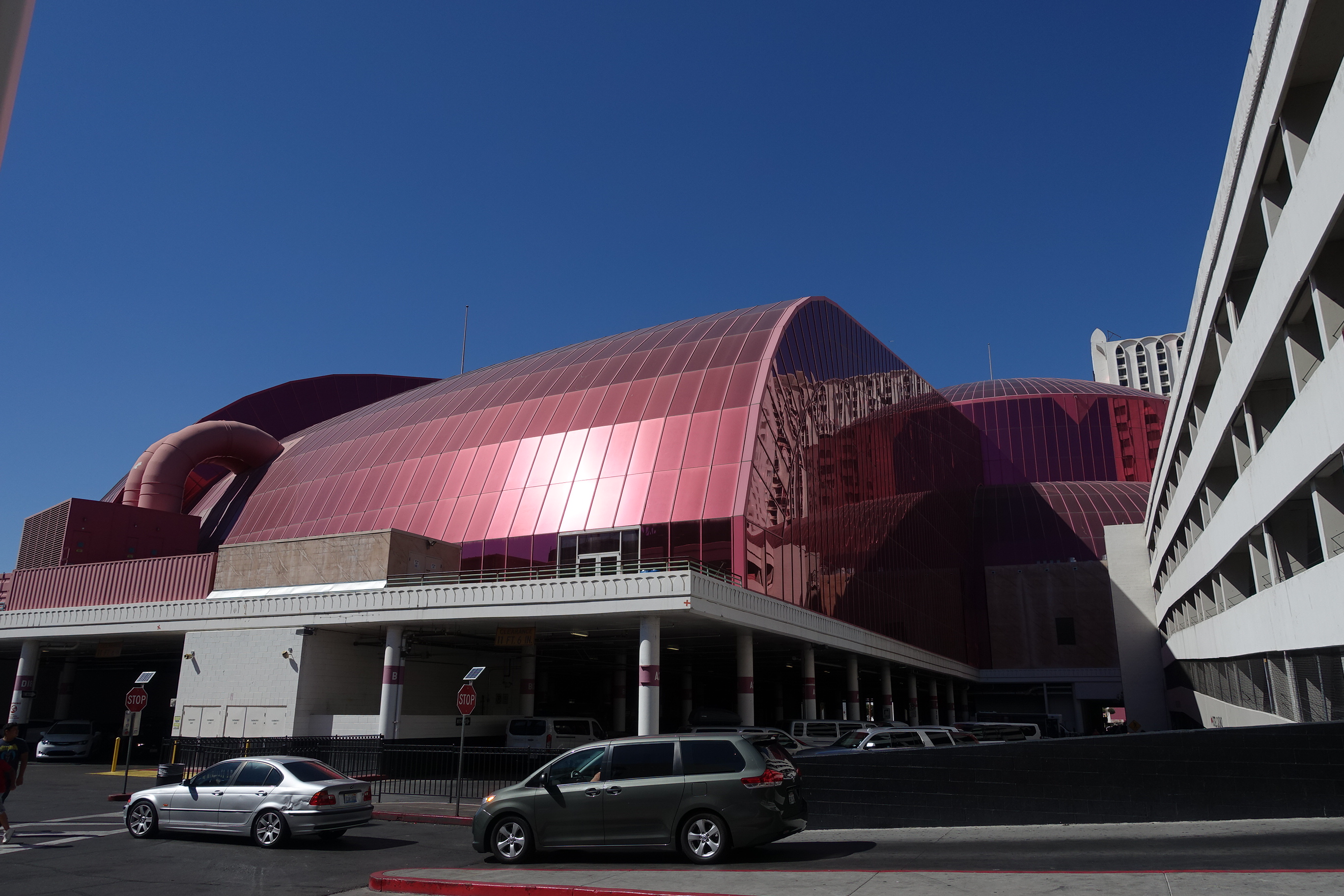
Adventuredome at street level

Circus Circus Enterprises announced the theme park on August 26, 1992, as an addition to its Circus Circus Las Vegas resort. The Grand Slam Canyon, themed after the Grand Canyon, would be built west of the casino, on a deck located above a parking lot. Veldon Simpson was the architect, and Arrow Dynamics was hired to design and build several of the rides. Perini Corporation was hired to construct the dome itself. The park cost $90 million to build.

Construction was underway in September 1992, and the opening was initially scheduled for the following July. Circus Circus hoped to have the Grand Slam Canyon opened before the MGM Grand Adventures theme park, which opened in December 1993. The building's dome design was created entirely out of pink tinted glass, with each pane weighing approximately 300 lb (140 kg). The dome itself consists of over 350,000 sq ft (33,000 m^{2}) of pink insulated glass placed over a teal green frame. The dome has 8,615 panes of glass.

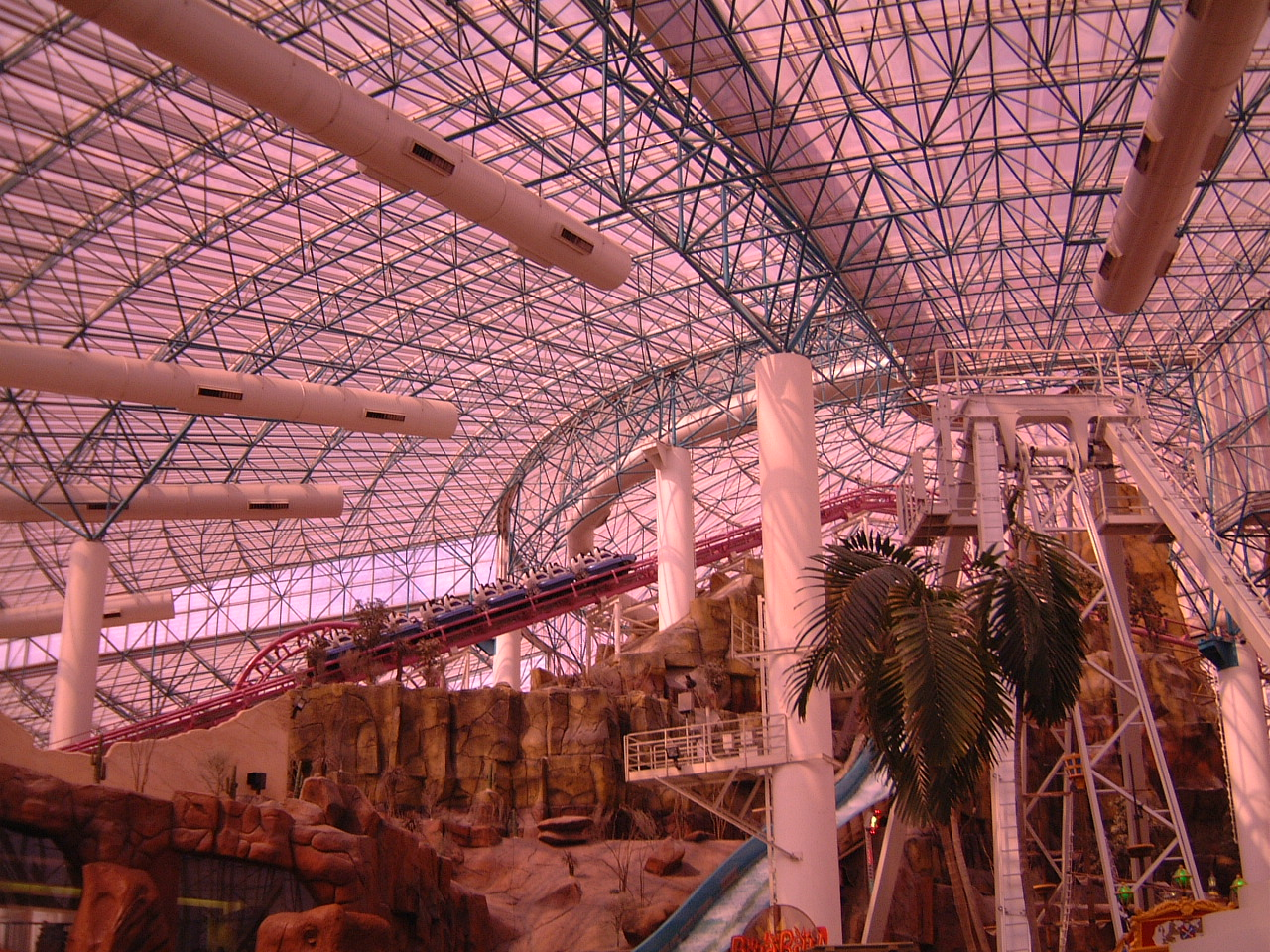
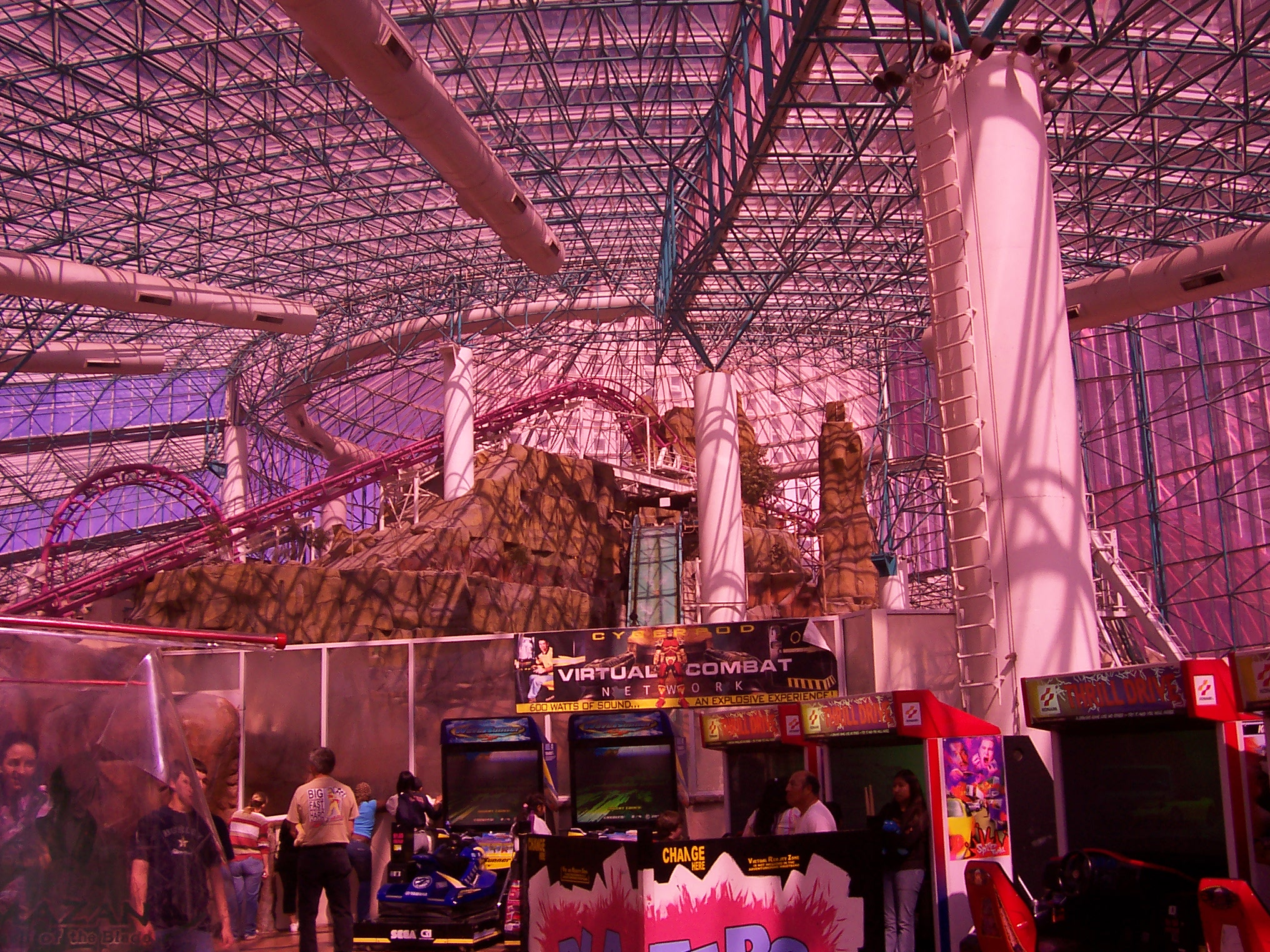
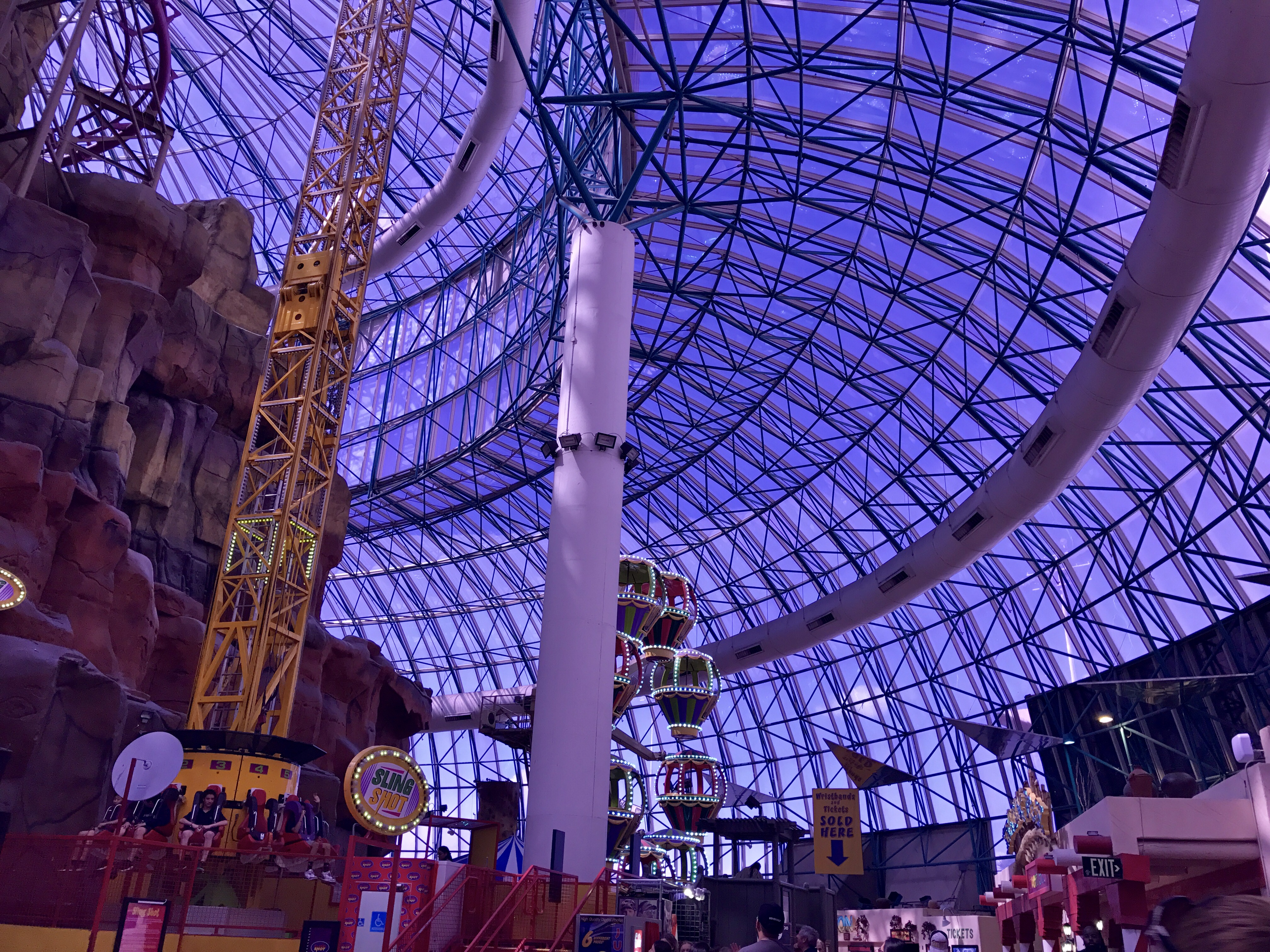
Adventuredome interior

Grand Slam Canyon opened on August 23, 1993. It featured river-rapid rides, two lagoonlike pools, a lazy creek and a re-creation of a pueblo. It had four attractions: the Canyon Blaster roller coaster, the Twist 'N' Shout water raft, the Rim Runner, and the Hot Shotz Lazer Tag arena, now known as Lazer Blast. The park also featured eight large animatronic dinosaurs spread throughout the park, with visitors being able to read the informational placards in front of each one. Though visitors could not ride them, the dinosaurs often "interacted" with the visitors, with some spitting water on guests.

Grand Slam Canyon was initially popular, but visitors expressed their desire for more to do. Tom Nolan, the vice president of theme park operations at Adventuredome, suggested that "it was a [matter] of what people wanted versus what they could do" and added that "there were a lot of animatronics, a lot of theming, but people said there weren't enough things to do." Following the feedback, the park closed for 45 days beginning in April 1994 to remodel, adding $15 million in new attractions. The park originally charged a $10 admission fee, but this was dropped in favor of a $2.50 fee for each ride.

During the remodeling, several family-friendly attractions were added, such as Midway shows, Canyon Cars (bumper cars), Sand Pirates (a swinging pirate ship), Miner Mike (a mini roller coaster), Thunderbirds (a mini airplane ride), and Drifters (a mini Ferris wheel). The Twist 'N' Shout water raft ride was removed to make way for several of these rides, due to its size. After the remodeling, rides were added to the theme park one or two at a time every few years, as space became available. Near the laser tag arena, for example, management added a rock climbing wall and a miniature golf course. Though initially hesitant to add the golf course out of concern for the park's glass dome, there have been no golf ball incidents as of 2009. The animatronic dinosaurs were eventually removed.

In its early years, the park was sometimes also known as "Grand Slam Canyon Adventuredome". The name was changed to simply "Adventuredome" in 1997. The theme park is climate-controlled, and this helped it succeed over MGM Grand Adventures, which was outdoors and struggled during the hot summer months in Las Vegas. The Adventuredome also competed against the nearby Wet 'n Wild water park.

The Adventuredome began offering IMAX film rides in 1998, including one based on the animated series ReBoot. In 1999, management consulted visitor surveys to keep up with the industry developments. This resulted in the addition of several thrill rides, including the Inverter that same year, Chaos in 2001, and the Sling Shot in 2004. The new rides were part of an effort to target an older demographic, from ages 13 and up.

On February 3, 2013, the Rim Runner was permanently closed to make way for a newer roller coaster named "El Loco", which opened on February 18, 2014. The Rim Runner's closure left the Canyon Blaster as the only original ride left from the park's opening.

Phil Ruffin purchased Circus Circus and the Adventuredome from MGM Resorts International in 2019. Renovations in 2023 added several new attractions.

Aside from rides, the Adventuredome includes midway and arcade games.

=== Attendance ===
The park had its 1-millionth guest in May 1994, and its 10-millionth in July 1998. At that time, the park averaged two million visitors a year. A record for daily attendance was hit on November 27, 1999, with 30,130 visitors. In 2000, the Adventuredome ranked 19th in North America and 34th in the world for attendance, with 2.9 million visitors. As of 2001, the park received an average of 7,500 visitors daily. In 2003, park attendance ranked 11th in North America and 19th in the world. The park had received 30 million total visitors as of 2004. Another single-day record was reached in November 2005, with 41,182 people. The Adventuredome had its 50 millionth visitor on January 1, 2009. In 2014, attendance was 3.2 million people.

=== Fright Dome ===
In 2003, the Adventuredome partnered with brothers Jason and Michael Egan, who owned Fright America, to transform the theme park into a temporary Halloween attraction known as Fright Dome. The project, modeled after Knott's Scary Farm, was intended to boost attendance during October, which was usually a poor month for visitation as children return to school. Fright Dome included haunted houses and actors in costumes. Nine of the theme park's rides, aimed at younger children, were closed during the Fright Dome event, in an effort to appeal to an older demographic.

Fright Dome became an annual event at the Adventuredome each October. It cost $2 million to put on each year. New features were added for each Fright Dome. In 2005, Fright Dome attracted 50,000 visitors. USA Today considered Fright Dome to be among the top 10 haunted house attractions in the U.S. In 2014, the Travel Channel ranked Fright Dome as the second best haunted attraction in the country, and another location was opened that year in Hong Kong.

Fright Dome was sometimes themed after horror films, including The Texas Chain Saw Massacre (1974), and the Halloween and Saw films. The 2016 event included a haunted house based on Five Nights at Freddy's.

In 2017, the last Fright Dome was held, as Circus Circus announced that Fright Dome would not return for 2018.

== Rides and attractions ==
The current and former attractions at the amusement park are provided below.

=== Current ===
==== Coasters ====
Current name	Picture	Opening date	Manufacturer	Minimum height requirements	Description	Ref(s)
Canyon Blaster		August 23, 1993	Arrow Dynamics	48 inches	The world's largest indoor double-loop, double-corkscrew roller coaster. This is an original park attraction.	
El Loco		February 18, 2014	S&S Worldwide	48 inches	Only the second of its kind in the United States, El Loco, a custom S&S coaster, took the place of the splash down pool of the Rim Runner ride.	

==== Premium rides ====
Current name	Picture	Opening date	Manufacturer	Minimum height requirements	Description	Ref(s)
Disk'O		2007	Zamperla	48 inches	A ride where passengers sit on a spinning disk which rides along a half pipe track.	
Angry Birds: The Ride		2018	SimEx-Iwerks	42 inches	Motion simulator experience in the Extreme Ride Theater.	
SCOOB! 4D Experience		2021	SimEx-Iwerks	33 inches	A 4-D film experience at the FX Theater.	
Ice Age: No Time for Nuts 4D		2016	SimEx-Iwerks	33 inches	A 4-D film in the FX Theater.	
Inverter		1999	Chance Rides	48 inches	Ride that spins riders upside down.	
Lazer Blast		August 23, 1993	Unknown	42 inches	A laser tag arena built into the base of the park's signature mountain. This is an original park attraction, initially known as Hot Shots Lazer Tag.	
NebulaZ		November 2020	Zamperla	42 inches to ride	NebulaZ is a three-minute ride with eight gondolas which fly through the air.	
Sling Shot		May 2004	Chance Morgan	48 inches	100' tall free fall ride that shoots riders upwards with 4G's of acceleration.	

==== Large rides ====
Current name	Picture	Opening date	Manufacturer	Minimum height requirements	Description	Ref(s)
Canyon Cars		1994	I.E. Park	42 inches to ride, 54 inches to drive	Bumper cars.	
Sand Pirates		1994	Zamperla	33 inches	Swinging pirate ship.	

==== Junior rides ====
Current name	Picture	Opening date	Manufacturer	Minimum height requirements	Description	Ref(s)
Frog Hopper		2002	S&S Worldwide	36–58 inches	A ride that bounces riders up and down.	
Thunderbirds		1994	Zamperla	36–58 inches	An airplane carousel that flies through the air.	

==== Family rides ====
Current name	Picture	Opening date	Manufacturer	Minimum height requirements	Description	Ref(s)
B.C. Bus		1994	Zamperla	42 inches	A bus that goes up, down and around.	
Circus Carousel		1997	Chance Rides	42 inches	Carousel themed with circus animals.	
Circus Swings	Circus Swings a Wave Swinger at Adventure Dome	2022	Zamperla	42 inches	Circus themed wave swinger.	
Drifters		1994	Zamperla	42 inches	A hot air balloon themed Ferris wheel.	
Road Runner		1994	Wisdom Rides	42 inches	Mini-Himalaya that gives a wild trip going forwards and backwards.	
Twistin' Tea Cups	Twistin' Tea Cups Ride at Adventurdome	2022	Zamperla	42 inches	A spinning teacup ride where riders spin inside pods while spinning on a disk.	

=== Former ===
Ride name	Picture	Opening date	Closing date	Manufacturer	Description
Chaos		March 2001	2023	Chance Rides	This was a ride that would spin while allowing each car to flip on its own axis while tilted to a 70 degree angle. This attraction will be replaced by a new upcoming ride which is yet to be announced.
Dino Island		c. May 2004 (Note: Archived versions of the Adventuredome's website indicate the ride opened between April 2004 and June 2004.)	January 2006	SimEx-Iwerks	
Dino Island II: Escape from Dino Island		c. May 2004 (first opening date); November or December 2009 (second opening date)	January 2006 (first closing date); May 2011(second closing date)	SimEx-Iwerks	This was a simulator in which one would rescue the last remaining dinosaur on earth. It was replaced with Happy Feet: Mumble's Wild Ride.
Xtreme Log Ride		November or December 2009	Unknown	SimEx-Iwerks	Motion simulator experience.
Fun House Express		March 1998	October or November 2004	SimEx-Iwerks	Motion simulator experience.
Happy Feet: Mumble's Wild Ride		May 2011	Unknown	SimEx-Iwerks	Motion simulator with scenes from Happy Feet.
Miner Mike		1994	2019	Wisdom Rides	A small children's coaster
Pacific Rim Motion Movie Experience		2016	Unknown	SimEx-Iwerks	Motion simulator with scenes from Pacific Rim.
ReBoot: The Ride		April 2000	October or November 2004	SimEx-Iwerks	Based on the TV series ReBoot.
Rim Runner		August 23, 1993	February 3, 2013	Arrow Dynamics	Shoot-the-Chutes with a 60-foot (18 m) drop. This was an original park attraction.
SpongeBob SquarePants 4-D		May or June 2005	May 2013	SimEx-Iwerks	A 4-D ride based on the television series SpongeBob SquarePants.
Twist 'N' Shout		August 23, 1993	April 1994	ProSlide Technology	A rafting ride that travelled along twists and turns. Occupied an area that is now home to Canyon Cars, Sand Pirates and midway games. This was an original park attraction.

== In popular culture ==
- In the 1999 film Baby Geniuses, the Adventuredome makes an appearance as the fictional "Joyworld" theme park. Sly starts the Canyon Blaster ride with two scientists on board and restraints still open. Both fall from the ride.
- In the season 3 episode titled "Rollercoaster Thru Criss" from the TV series Criss Angel Mindfreak, a train "goes through" Criss' body while he stands on the track of the Canyon Blaster ride after the corkscrews, and Criss ends up in the front seat.
