= Montyne =

American painter

- Born: Sherman LaMont Sudbury; 23 November 1916; Salt Lake City, Utah, USA
- Died: 17 March 1989 (aged 72); Las Vegas, Nevada, USA
- Known for: Sculpting, Painting
- Notable work: Lose-a-Minute Save-a-Life campaign (1939); Roman Fiesta (1963); View-Master 3D Scenes of Tarzan of the Apes (1968); Statues at Circus Circus Las Vegas (1968); Ceiling murals at the MGM Grand Hotel (1973)
- Website: http://www.montyne.com

Montyne (November 23, 1916 – March 17, 1989) was an American artist and stage performer. He was best known for his sculptures that once stood in front of Circus Circus Las Vegas and for his View-Master scenes of Tarzan of the Apes.

== Early life ==
Montyne was born Sherman LaMont Sudbury, the son of Sherman Sudbury and Lavon Browning.

His talent was recognized at the age of nine. He began studying art privately, and soon after, anatomy with medical students. He attended the University of Utah where he began to fence. Montyne attended the AB Wright Academy of Fine Arts.

== Artist ==
The first record of Montyne using his professional name is on a painting called Twinkle Star. The artist applied colorful oils on a thin round sheet of glass, with the figure in the painting holding a star. When light is placed behind this work, the star shines; signed "Monty ne – 1934".

During the 1930s, 40s, and into the 50s Montyne created works of art as an illustrator, commissioned fine artist, and muralist. In 1955, in Portland, Oregon, he met his wife China. In 1963 Montyne created a float called the Roman Fiesta and entered it into Portland Rose Festival's Grand Floral Parade. The float took all top honors including first place.

== Tarzan of the Apes ==
In 1966, executives from GAF Corporation saw Montyne’s work and wanted him to create the three-dimensional scenes for their upcoming View-Master stereo pictures of Tarzan of the Apes. The book contains 21 scenes recreating the Edgar Rice Burroughs story. Montyne created an illusion of depth, using special lighting and an understanding of photography, to make viewers think Tarzan was over three hundred feet in the air flying through the trees. The scene actually only had a depth of three feet.

== Las Vegas ==
=== Circus Circus ===
Montyne moved to Las Vegas in 1968 to sculpt the statues in front of Circus Circus. The first, The Balancer, was a self-portrait, depicting him as an acrobat. This heroic-size statue in 1978 was featured on the front cover of 35mm Photography. The work at one time was one of the most-photographed sculptures in the world. Over the next three years, he created four more statues: the Lion, the Clown, Gargantua the gorilla, and his wife China who was featured balancing on a rolo-board.

=== MGM Grand ===
While working on the statues at Circus Circus, Montyne also was commissioned to create the wall murals in the convention hall at the then-International Hotel. A challenging contract was the MGM Grand Hotel and Casino. The casino was longer than a football field, and on the 15 ceiling arches were Montyne’s murals. The murals were destroyed in the 1980 MGM Grand fire.

After the MGM commission Montyne worked on his sculpting skills, creating small statues for galleries in the hotels on The Las Vegas Strip. He created Windsong (1976), Marathon-man (1979), The Indian Warriors (1980), and The Intrusion (started in 1975).

== Death ==
On March 17, 1989 Montyne died of pneumonia while suffering from cerebral granulomatosis angitis. He is buried in Palm Mortuary.
