= Pick Up Stix =

American fast-casual restaurant chain

- A bowl of Firecracker chicken
- Industry: Restaurants
- Founded: 1989; 37 years ago in Rancho Santa Margarita
- Founder: Charlie Zhang
- Headquarters: Laguna Hills, California, United States
- Number of locations: More than 70
- Key people: Linda Nelson, COO and Lorne Goldberg, owner
- Number of employees: 1,000
- Parent: Mandarin Holdings
- Website: www.pickupstix.com

Pick Up Stix is an American fast-casual restaurant chain based in Laguna Hills, California, that serves fresh Asian cuisine (or Chinese-American cuisine as well) through corporate-owned restaurants and franchises in Southern California. The company serves both dine-in and take-out customers, and offers offsite catering and some delivery services. It also supplies meals to private schools as part of a school lunch program. It is owned by Lorne Goldberg's Mandarin Holdings, the parent company of Leeann Chin, who bought the company from Carlson Companies in 2010.

All of the company's food is cooked-to-order over high-heat burners using traditional woks. In a readers' poll in the June 2008 issue of San Diego Magazine, Pick Up Stix was named one of the three "Best Takeout" restaurants in San Diego.

== History ==
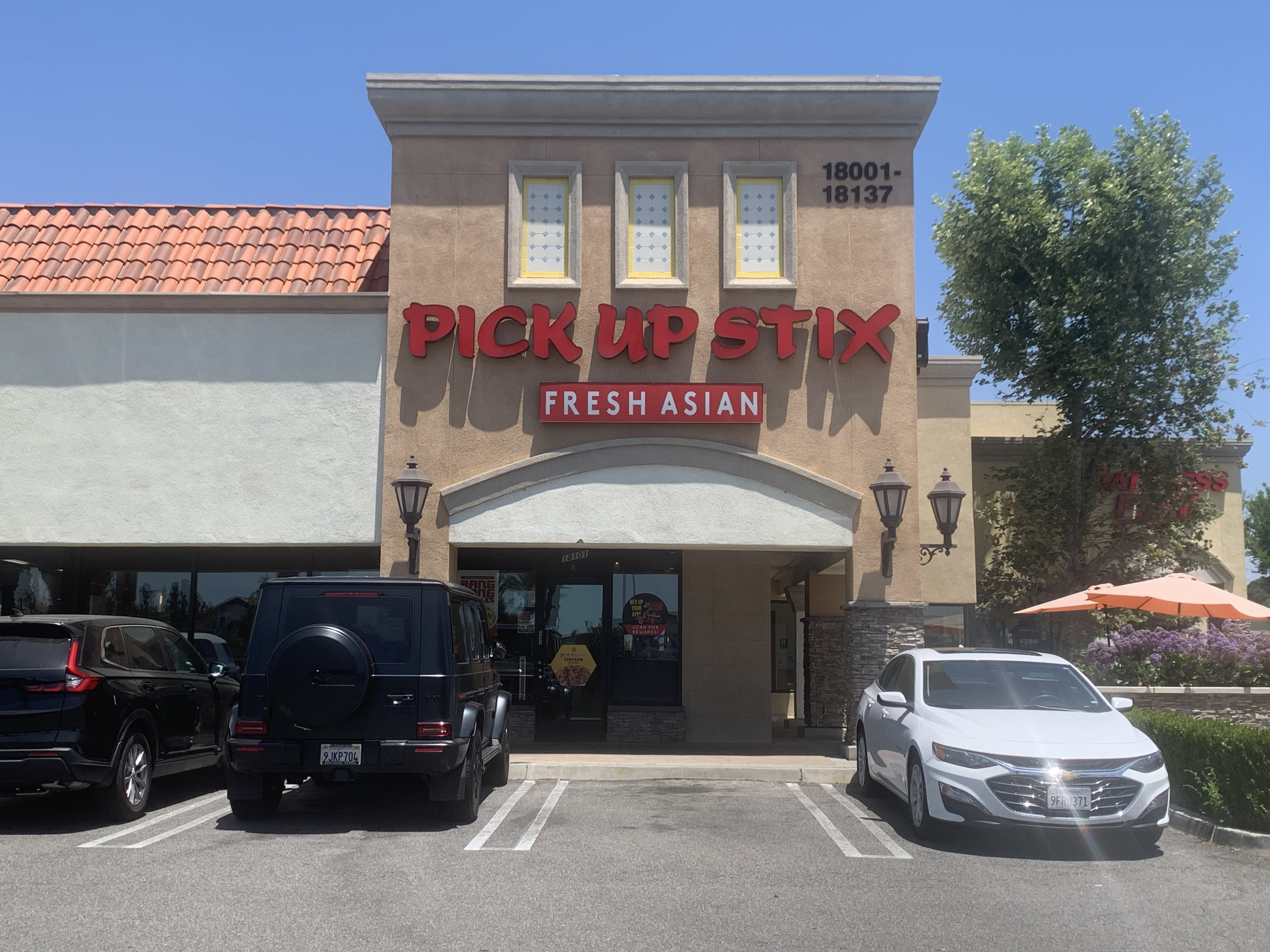
A Pick Up Stix location in Los Angeles

Pick Up Stix was created by a Chinese immigrant, Charlie Zhang, who moved to the United States in 1982 with only $20 in his pocket. He took traditional Asian food and adapted it to the American palate by reducing the amount of oil and adding wine, vinegar and soy sauce. He opened the first restaurant in Rancho Santa Margarita, California, in 1989. By 1992, there were two more locations in Orange County, in Irvine and Laguna Niguel. Two years later, the chain expanded into San Diego County with locations in Del Mar, Carlsbad and San Diego. In July 2001, the company was acquired by Carlson Restaurants Worldwide, a unit of the Carlson Companies. The company is headquartered in Laguna Hills, California, and owns and operates its own food-processing facility. Zhang remained as president and CEO of the company until his retirement in 2003. In 2010, Carlson Restaurants Worldwide sold the company to Lorne Goldberg's Mandarin Holdings. There are over 70 locations throughout the United States.

== Closings ==
In early 2008, 26 locations were closed in California, Nevada and Arizona in order to "focus on stronger markets". In 2010, all locations in Nevada and Arizona were closed although Pick Up Stix' Facebook page encouraged these states' local customers to continue to enjoy their menu at various California locations. However, in late 2012 the Food Court in the Excalibur Hotel and Casino in Las Vegas underwent a major renovation. As a result of the renovation Manchu Wok was removed and a branch of Pick Up Stix was put in its place. In 2022, their Rancho Santa Margarita location was closed.
