= Phil Ruffin =

American businessman (born 1935)

- Born: March 14, 1935 (age 91); Potter County, Texas, U.S.
- Education: Washburn University; Wichita State University
- Spouse(s): Mary Miller (divorced); Lynne Ruffin (divorced); Oleksandra Nikolayenko

Phillip Ruffin is an American businessman. He owns the Treasure Island Hotel and Casino and Circus Circus Hotel & Casino in Las Vegas, in addition to a number of other enterprises including hotels, casinos, greyhound racing tracks, oil production, convenience stores, real estate, and the world's largest manufacturer of hand trucks. On the Forbes 2026 list of the world's billionaires, he was ranked No. 972 with a net worth of US$4.3 billion.

== Early life and education ==
Ruffin was born in Potter County near Amarillo, Texas. He is of Lebanese descent (his family's surname was originally "Rufan"; Arabic: روفان). He was raised in Wichita, Kansas where his father had a grocery store. He has four siblings: Elaine Ruffin Nemer, Roy Ruffin Jr., Pat Ruffin, and Pam Ruffin. In 1953, he graduated from Wichita North High School where he was a wrestling champion. "After he won the state championship," states one profile, "his father, who never attended a match, asked him if he was the one they were talking about in the newspaper." He attended Washburn University in Topeka for three years and Wichita State University but never got his degree.

== Career ==
In 1972, Ruffin pioneered self-serve gasoline in Kansas, creating a chain of 60 convenience stores in the Midwest. In 1987, he then used cash from the convenience stores to build his first hotel, a Marriott in Wichita. His businesses also included oil distribution and one of the country's largest manufacturers of hand trucks.

In 1994, Ruffin leased his convenience stores to Total, using the money to purchase more hotels. Then, in 1995, Ruffin acquired the Crystal Palace casino resort in Nassau in the Bahamas. Mortgaging the casino, Ruffin then purchased the New Frontier Hotel and Casino.

=== New Frontier Hotel and Casino ===
Ruffin is best known for his purchase of the New Frontier Hotel and Casino, one of the Las Vegas Strip's venerable properties. When he bought the resort from Margaret Elardi and her family, it had been mired in a longtime strike, the longest running in American history, with employees represented by the Culinary Workers Union, one of the most powerful labor organizations in Las Vegas. Ruffin settled the strike very soon after his purchase in 1998. Soon after, the casino-hotel became known as the New Frontier. In 2005, Ruffin announced plans to demolish the New Frontier and replace it in 2005 with a new resort to be called The Montreaux, but the development never got off the ground. Ruffin sold the New Frontier to El Ad Properties in 2007. The $1.2 billion sale price for the 36 acres (15 ha) property was the largest per-acre price in The Strip's history.

=== Treasure Island ===
MGM Mirage sold Treasure Island Hotel and Casino (TI) to Ruffin in March 2009. The negotiated price was $600 million in cash and $175 million in secured notes. Ruffin estimates that to build a casino like Treasure Island from the ground up would cost $2.7 billion. In calendar year 2008, Treasure Island reported $376M in revenue (down from $431M in 2007) and $101M in EBITDA. Ruffin expressed his lack of concern about buying a casino in a down market, because the TI will have very little debt. Ruffin took complete ownership of the hotel and casino resort in the early morning of March 20, 2009. In February 2018 he said he had turned down a "huge" offer for TI from a Chinese firm, explaining that Strip assets are "irreplaceable." "There isn't any price they could throw at me that would interest me," he said. "Money is not that valuable. Assets are valuable, especially when they are irreplaceable."

=== Trump International Tower ===
Ruffin's joint venture with his friend Donald Trump involved a portion of the New Frontier land. The Trump International Hotel and Tower, built immediately adjacent to the Fashion Show Mall, broke ground in July 2005. The tower opened in March 2008, and plans for an identical second tower were announced. Ruffin has a half-interest in the development, having contributed the land for his part of the deal.

=== Circus Circus ===
MGM Resorts International sold Circus Circus Las Vegas to Ruffin in December 2019 for $825 million. The purchase includes the adjacent Slots-A-Fun Casino, the Adventuredome amusement park, and adjacent open space. Ruffin plans to add to the property a swimming pool complex with a wave machine, sand beaches and a lazy river ride.

In January 2025, Ruffin stated his intention to sell the property, contradicting his February 2018 statement calling strip properties "irreplaceable" and couldn't be exchanged for money.

=== Wichita Greyhound Park ===
Ruffin's company owns Wichita Greyhound Park. On August 7, 2007, Ruffin announced that he would close the track, after a voting referendum to allow slot machines or casino gambling at his dog racing track failed by a narrow margin. The referendum to expand gambling at the dog track was long opposed by Kansas state Senate President Susan Wagle, a Republican who owned bingo parlors with her husband.

=== Convenience stores ===
Ruffin Companies' web site states that the company owns 61 convenience stores leased to Total and operated by Diamond Shamrock over a three-state area.

=== Lodging ===
Ruffin's Hotel Group division owns and operates 13 hotels under the Marriott Hotels, Fairfield Inn and Courtyard by Marriott brands in Oklahoma, Kansas, California, Texas and Alabama.

=== Manufacturing ===
Ruffin owns and operates Harper Trucks, the world's largest manufacturer of hand trucks and Angelus Manufacturing, a maker of steel hand trucks. In December 2013, Ruffin purchased the assets of Torrance, California-based WelCom Products, makers of the Magna Cart line of folding hand trucks sold across the US and over 25 countries worldwide.

=== Casino Miami ===
Ruffin purchased Casino Miami in Miami, Florida which was sold to him on December 3, 2018. It is located at 3500 NW 37th Avenue, Miami, Florida with extensive plans to expand.

== Relationship with Donald Trump ==
Ruffin is a longtime friend and business partner of Donald Trump, who was the best man at Ruffin's third wedding in 2008. "Few know Trump as well, or in as many capacities, as Ruffin," reported the Associated Press in March 2017. They met at Trump Tower "in the early 2000s" when Ruffin was considering adding a Trump hotel to his Treasure Island casino. That idea did not pan out, but sometime later, in Las Vegas, "Ruffin took Trump to a Nordstrom parking lot to show him a parcel of undeveloped land." Ruffin said, "This is where you ought to be," and Trump "instantly made a decision" to build there. Their wives are also good friends. Ruffin has described a Trump handshake as "better than any contract." In June 2018, Trump gave the Ruffins a tour of Air Force One during a stop in Las Vegas.

=== 2013 Trump visit to Moscow ===
Ruffin may have become an important witness in the Trump-Russia Investigation and to disputed allegations in the related Steele dossier. Trump had flown on Ruffin's private jet to Moscow in 2013 for the Trump-owned Miss Universe Pageant. At the time Ruffin himself was married to a former Miss Universe, Ukrainian supermodel, Oleksandra Nikolayenko. Trump has since been accused of having engaged with prostitutes in urolagnia-related sexual activities in a hotel room during that trip, and that those activities were filmed by Russian agents intended for the blackmailing of Donald Trump (kompromat). Former British intelligence officer, Christopher Steele provided reports of such activities, although they have not been substantiated in any major media outlets. Trump has repeatedly denied having stayed overnight in Moscow for the pageant (and therefore didn't require a hotel room) despite flight records indicating that Ruffin's plane arrived in Moscow on a Friday morning and departed Sunday.

On that same trip. Ruffin may also have attended a meeting with Trump, Trump's bodyguard Keith Schiller, and local Russian officials regarding the development of a Trump Tower Moscow, another important aspect of the Trump-Russia Investigation.

=== Trump Campaign ===
In 2015, Trump also mentioned Ruffin as a person that he would send as an envoy to China if elected president. Ruffin said later that the remark was a joke. Trump traveled to Mexico City on August 31, 2016 aboard a Boeing 737 (registration N43PR) operated by a company owned by Phil Ruffin.

Ruffin gave $1 million in 2015 to the Make America Great Again PAC, a super PAC supporting the Trump's campaign for the presidency. Ruffin's contribution made up more than half of all of the contributions received by the super PAC ($1.74 million). The super PAC shut down and refunded Ruffin's money after the Washington Post reported on its close association with Trump's campaign. At an event in January 2016, Trump praised Ruffin for making a $1 million donation to veterans' groups.

In April 2017, Ruffin said that he talks with Trump every fortnight or so. "If something comes up, I’ll call him," Ruffin stated. "They’ll always put me through. But I don't call unless it's something important." In May 2017, he lamented that the news media had "a vendetta" against Trump. "I don't know how he can stand it," Ruffin said. "Every day it's something new. If he says good morning, they find something wrong with that." He added that Trump was "not used to that level of criticism. He gave up a lot – the most luxurious life you can imagine, and he did it to try to help the country." Ruffin told Sheldon Adelson's Las Vegas Review-Journal in February 2018 that he was "thrilled to death" with Trump's tax cuts.

Together with his spouse, Ruffin contributed a total of $1.5 million to Trump's 2020 presidential campaign. In 2023, Ruffin contributed $2 million to Trump's Make America Great Again (MAGA Inc.) super PAC.

=== Trump University settlement payment ===
In February 2019, during a meeting of the US House Committee on Oversight and Reform, Congresswoman Jackie Speier suggested "a Kansan", later revealed to be Ruffin, had paid $25 million to satisfy Trump's liability in the Trump University judgement. Ruffin admitted to paying Trump $28 million in 2018, but claimed it was for "back-fees" related to Trump International Hotel Las Vegas and unrelated to the Trump University case.

== Personal life ==
Ruffin has been married three times. He has three children with his second wife Lynne: Daughter Michelle Ruffin-Stein runs the Wichita Marriott which he owns; his son Chris Ruffin runs Wichita Hyatt which he owns; and his son Phil Ruffin Jr. runs Harper Trucks Inc. a hand truck manufacturer. On January 6, 2008, the then-72-year-old Ruffin married the then-26-year-old supermodel and Miss Ukraine 2004 title holder Oleksandra Nikolayenko. They have two children: Richard William Ruffin (born April 2010) and daughter Malena (born 2013). Ruffin funded "an organic food and learning initiative" at the Alexander Dawson School at Rainbow Mountain.

Ruffin appeared on the 7th season of GSN's High Stakes Poker.
