= Canyon Blaster (Adventuredome) =

Steel roller coaster

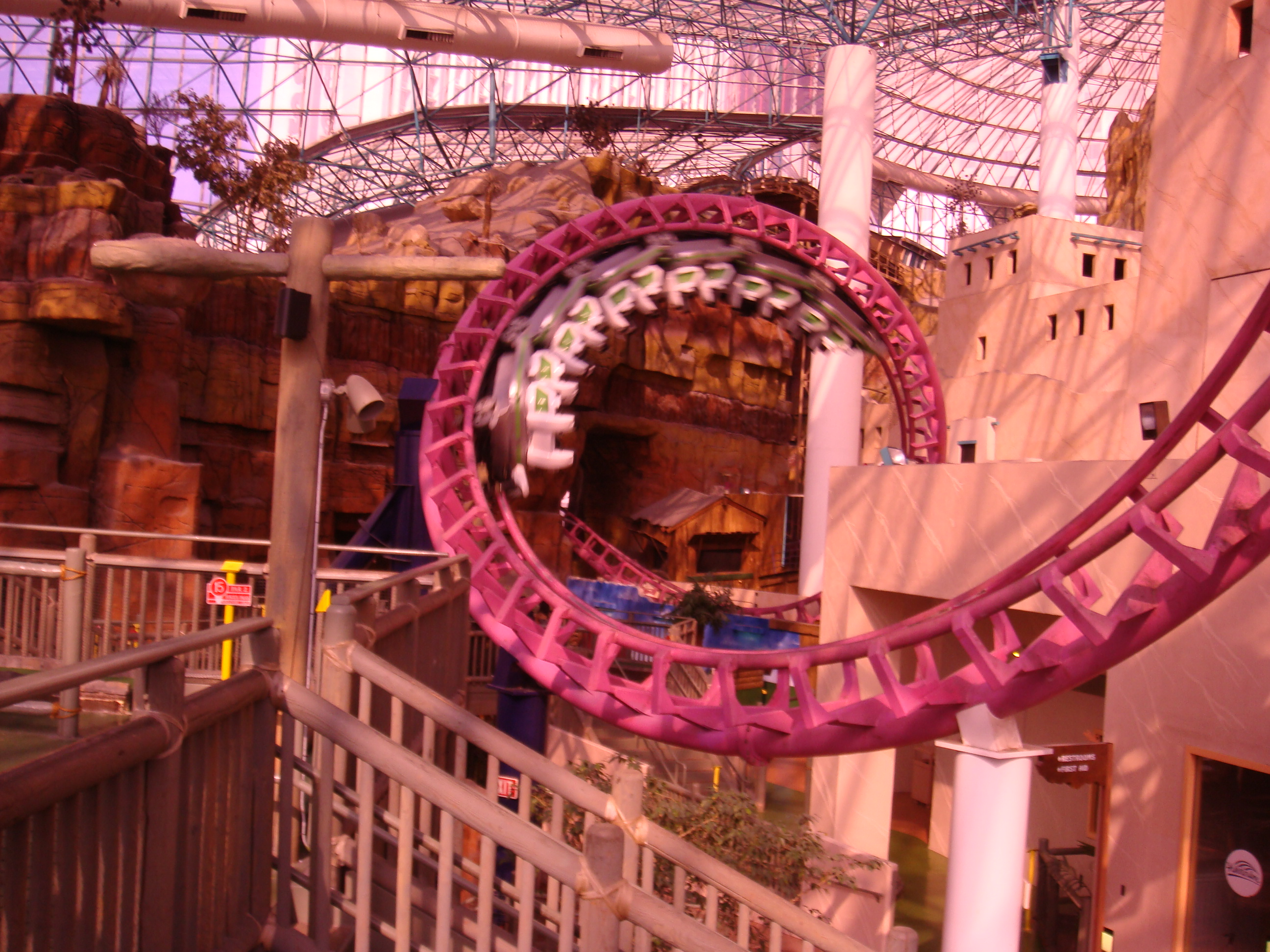
- Canyon Blaster train with the current white and green livery passing the second of the two double corkscrews.

Adventuredome
- Location: Adventuredome
- Park section: 2nd Level
- Coordinates: 36°08′17″N 115°09′59″W
- Status: Operating
- Opening date: August 23, 1993

General statistics
- Type: Steel – Indoor
- Manufacturer: Arrow Dynamics
- Lift/launch system: Chain
- Height: 94 ft (29 m)
- Drop: 66 ft (20 m)
- Length: 2,423 ft (739 m)
- Speed: 41 mph (66 km/h)
- Inversions: 4
- Duration: 1:30
- Max vertical angle: 53°
- G-force: 3.5
- Restraint style: Over-the-shoulder
- Height restriction: 48 in (122 cm)
- Trains: 2 (typically 1 in operation) trains with 6 cars; riders arranged 2 across in 2 rows for a total of 24 riders per train
- Canyon Blaster at RCDB

Canyon Blaster is an indoor roller coaster at the Adventuredome theme park in Winchester, Nevada. It features back-to-back vertical loops and corkscrews, and ends with a helix inside the mountain that takes up a large portion of the park. It is proclaimed as the world's largest indoor double-loop, double-corkscrew coaster. The roller coaster is a clone of the Arrow Dynamics roller coaster "Rolling X-Train" in the South Korean theme park Everland.

Canyon Blaster features two six-car trains that seat four passengers in two rows per car. When it originally opened it operated with seven-car trains. In 2001, the trains were re-painted in a dark blue and deep purple heliochrome paint but changed to white and green livery somewhere between 2010 and 2011.

It is the second Arrow coaster to be built for an indoor amusement park. The first was Chicago Loop at Old Chicago in Bolingbrook, Illinois, later relocated to Canobie Lake Park as an outdoor coaster named Canobie Corkscrew.

== Ride experience ==
The train departs from the loading zone and gets pulled up the lift. After that, the train drops a bit and curves and makes the 66 ft. drop, entering the double loops. Afterward, the train turns right into the double corkscrews. Then the train goes into the double helix and pulls back into the station.

Typically a single train is used while the other comes out during busier times.

== In media ==
- Baby Geniuses - part of fictional "Joyworld" theme park, Sly starts the ride with two scientists on board and restraints still open. Both fall from the ride.
- Criss Angel Mindfreak (Season 3 Episode "Rollercoaster") - a train "goes through" Criss' body while he stands on the track after the corkscrews and Criss ends up in the front seat.
