= Bruno Mars at Park MGM =

2016–2025 residency show

- Residency by Bruno Mars
- Location: Paradise, Nevada, U.S. National Harbor, Maryland, U.S. Boston, Massachusetts, U.S. Cotai, Macau, China
- Venue: Dolby Live at Park MGM; The Theater at MGM National Harbor; MGM Music Hall at Fenway; MGM Cotai
- Start date: December 27, 2016
- End date: December 31, 2025
- Legs: 20
- No. of shows: 110
- Attendance: 574,000
- Box office: $197.2 million

Bruno Mars concert chronology
- Bruno Mars at the Chelsea, Las Vegas (2013–2015); Bruno Mars at Park MGM (2016–2025); 24K Magic World Tour (2017–2018)

Bruno Mars at Park MGM was a concert residency by American singer-songwriter Bruno Mars. It was held at the Dolby Live (previously Park Theater) at Park MGM on the Las Vegas Strip in Paradise, Nevada, at the Theater at MGM National Harbor, in National Harbor, Maryland, at MGM Music Hall at Fenway, Boston, Massachusetts and once outside of the United States, in China at MGM Cotai in Cotai, Macau. For performances, Mars was accompanied by his band, the Hooligans, and the setlists feature songs from his albums Doo-Wops & Hooligans (2010), Unorthodox Jukebox (2012), and 24K Magic (2016), along with various covers.

The show typically ended with Mars performing an encore of "Uptown Funk" (2014). It received a positive reception from music critics, who praised the energy and the singer's showmanship. The concert residency was promoted by Live Nation and MGM Resorts, has lasted nine years, and grossed $124.5 million. The April 2020 shows were canceled due to the COVID-19 pandemic. At the 2022 Billboard Music Awards, the residency won Top R&B Tour. The concert residency grossed $197.2 million and sold 574,000 tickets.

== Background and development ==
On October 10, 2016, Entertainment Tonight announced that Bruno Mars had signed a two-year deal with MGM Resorts International to perform at the Park Theater in Las Vegas and the Theater at MGM National Harbor in Maryland. This was Mars' second concert residency, after performing at The Chelsea. The president of MGM Resorts International, Bill Hornbuckle, was quoted as saying "There is no stronger launching pad for a new venue than for Mars to be among the first to grace its stage". The singer was among the first to perform at MGM National Harbor, as well as the first to perform at the new Park Theater, which, at the time, featured 5,300 seats, as well as brand new audio and visual technology. The concert residency was promoted by Live Nation and occasionally by MGM Resorts. At least as of, July 28, 2018, the concert had a no cell phone policy, with the audience's devices locked in Yondr pouches before entry.

The first show of the residency took place on December 27, 2016, at the theater at MGM National Harbor. It was followed by two shows on December 30 and 31 of 2016 at the Park Theater, in Las Vegas. In 2017, the singer performed a total of eight shows, two at the theater at MGM National Harbor and the other six at the Park Theater. He also took the stage on December 30 and 31, similar to the previous year. In 2018, Mars performed shows in February and July, all at The Park Theater. In 2019, he performed at the Park Theater in April, May and September.

In 2020, the singer only performed on March 6 and 7, both at the Park Theater, mainly due to the ongoing COVID-19 pandemic. In 2021, Mars returned to perform at the Park Theater and MGM National Harbor from early July until late August. He continued performing in October at the both aforementioned venues. In mid-October, the Park Theater was renamed "Dolby Live", and the theater's sound system was upgraded to use Dolby Atmos surround sound technology as part of an agreement with Dolby. Mars continued his performances at both the venues aforementioned into December 2021.

In 2022, Mars performed seven shows, two at MGM National Harbor in National Harbor, three at the MGM Music Hall at Fenway in Boston, and two at Dolby Live in Las Vegas, including the New Year's Eve show. In 2023, Mars performed in January and February at Dolby Live. Extra show dates for May and June 2023 were later added to the lineup at Dolby Live, except for two in June at The Theater at MGM National Harbor. In August, the final five show dates were added, including one on New Year's Eve.

In 2024, various shows were scheduled, including one on January 6 for the MGM Cotai in Macau. Several other concerts were scheduled in Las Vegas at Dolby Live throughout the rest of the year, including shows in February, June, August, September and December. In 2025, a total of sixteen additional dates were announced, six for May, one for June, six for August and three for September.

== Cancelled and rescheduled shows ==
The Las Vegas Review-Journal reported that Mars avoided close contact with fans at his shows on March 6 and 7, 2020, as a response to the COVID-19 pandemic. Moreover, MGM Resorts announced the cancellation of shows planned for April 20, 24, and 25 at the Park Theater due to the COVID-19 pandemic. On April 26, 2021, it was announced that Mars was to return to perform more concerts at the venue beginning on Fourth of July weekend. The scheduled shows sold out within minutes after being announced. On July 22, 2021, Mars postponed his July 23 and 24 shows to August 27 and 28 due to "unforeseen circumstances", according to a spokesperson for MGM Resorts.

== Concert synopsis ==
The concert, which had a runtime of 90 to 95 minutes, opened with "24K Magic" or "Finesse". During the show, Mars would split the fans in half to know "who was loudest". During the concert, the song "Runaway Baby" was interluded with The Isley Brothers's "Shout", and as Mars sang "A little bit softer now..." he and his band, The Hooligans, would fall to the ground, only to rise again, ending the track. There was also a mash-up of Barrett Strong's "Money (That's What I Want)" and Travie McCoy's "Billionaire", the latter featured Mars. He also covered "Pony" by Ginuwine and gave "Grenade" a guitar solo, transforming it into a rock song.

Mars also performed a song titled "I Took Your Phones Away" as a ballad. Mars sang "When I Was Your Man" alone on the stage. Afterwards, his band came back to perform "Locked Out of Heaven" and "Just the Way You Are" with him. During the 2017 New Year's Eve show, as the performance of "Locked Out of Heaven" ended, the power went out onstage. The show closed with an encore of "Uptown Funk". The concert included fire cannons and a large sign that spelled out 'Bruno Mars'. An artificial smoke machine was used during the shows.

Mars performed a medley of various covers that would vary according to dates and fan suggestions. During the New Year's Eve show, he sung portions of Celine Dion's "My Heart Will Go On", Queen's "We Will Rock You" and "Another One Bites the Dust", "Hollaback Girl" by Gwen Stefani, the Backstreet Boys' "I Want It That Way", The Beatles' chorus "Hey Jude" from the Cirque du Soleil's Love tribute show at The Mirage in Las Vegas, and "Isn't She Lovely" by Stevie Wonder. In another show, on February 19, 2018, Mars performed covers of songs by Ginuwine, Janet Jackson, Bobby Brown, Soul for Real's "Candy Rain", as well as portions of "My Cherie Amour" by Stevie Wonder, Lauryn Hill's "Doo Wop (That Thing)", and a full version of Prince's "Let's Go Crazy".

During the New Year's Eve show on December 31, 2021, Usher joined Mars on stage. They sang Usher's 2001 single "U Got It Bad" together as Mars played the piano, and Usher's "U Don't Have to Call" while Mars played the guitar and both danced side-by-side. After this number, Usher left the stage and watched the rest of the show from the Dolby Live VIP section. On August 27, 2024, Lady Gaga joined Mars on stage to sing together "Die with a Smile"; the performance was recorded and later released on Mars's YouTube channel.

== Reception ==
The residency was met with positive reviews from critics. Mike Weatherford from Las Vegas Review-Journal, while reviewing Mars' 2017 New Years concert, commented: "If the casinos could genetically engineer the perfect entertainment machine, Mars is it." Weatherford gave the show an A rating. Writing for the same publication, John Katsilometes dubbed the performance "extraordinary" and "classic". When reviewing Mars and Usher's show, Katsilometes wrote that these two kings "won the hand and rocked the house at Dolby Live at Park MGM". Las Vegas Weekly's Brock Radke noted that "the modern age of Vegas entertainment hasn't had a hotter, more relevant regular than Bruno Mars". Genevie Durano witting for Las Vegas Magazine praised the residency, "When Bruno Mars takes the stage at Dolby Live at Park MGM, something electric happens", she added "His presence does the heavy lifting, whether he's behind the drum kit, leading synchronized steps with his horn section or slowing the room down with a stripped-back ballad".

As of August 27, 2021, Billboard's Boxscore reported that Mars grossed $53.2 million and sold 201,000 tickets after playing 41 shows. The ten shows played between July and August 2021 had the highest per-show gross, per-show attendance, and per-ticket price out of the entire residency. The shows in July were sold out in minutes. In late September, his theater residency was the highest-grossing in the MGM franchise at $56.2 million. In late 2021, Billboard's Boxscore reported that Mars had the top R&B/hip-hop tour of the year, as well as the top-earning residency of 2021 with $24.4 million and 240,000 tickets sold that year. As of December 2024, the residency's Las Vegas shows have grossed $124.5 million from a total 410,000 tickets sold.

On December 31, 2024, Mars set a record for highest grossing theater-concert in Las Vegas residencies history. His concert sold 5,314 tickets with a $3.278 million gross. As of December 2025, Mars 108 shows, in Las Vegas, generated a revenue of $190,802,206 and sold 563,678 tickets. In the same year, Forbes reported that Mars estimated earnings from 19 shows in 2025 were around $30 million, including merchandise sales. As of April 11, 2026, Billboard reported that his 110 shows grossed a total of $197.2 million, selling 574,000 tickets. It became Dolby Live's (Park Theater) highest-grossing residency in the history of the venue.

In 2022, the residency won Top R&B Tour at the 2022 Billboard Music Awards. In April 2026, MGM Resorts International named Park Avenue, the street between Park MGM and T-Mobile Arena, "Bruno Mars Drive". To commemorate the renaming of the avenue a parade and ceremony will take place. The event celebrated Mars's ties to Las Vegas, such as his residency at Dolby Live at Park MGM. It also promoted his tour, The Romantic Tour (2026), that started that evening at Allegiant Stadium. Mars attended the event.

== Shows ==
List of concerts, showing date, city, venue, tickets sold, number of available tickets and amount of gross revenue
Date	City	Venue	Attendance	Revenue
Leg 1
December 27, 2016	National Harbor	The Theater at MGM National Harbor	2,646 / 2,746	$582,275
December 30, 2016	Las Vegas	The Park Theater	10,157 / 11,000	$2,547,397
December 31, 2016	Las Vegas	The Park Theater	10,157 / 11,000	$2,547,397
Leg 2
March 11, 2017	Las Vegas	The Park Theater	10,466 / 10,466	$2,158,850
March 12, 2017	Las Vegas	The Park Theater	10,466 / 10,466	$2,158,850
Leg 3
September 2, 2017	Las Vegas	The Park Theater	10,505 / 10,505	$2,153,264
September 3, 2017	Las Vegas	The Park Theater	10,505 / 10,505	$2,153,264
Leg 4
December 20, 2017	National Harbor	The Theater at MGM National Harbor	5,498 / 5,498	$1,354,000
December 21, 2017	National Harbor	The Theater at MGM National Harbor	5,498 / 5,498	$1,354,000
December 30, 2017	Las Vegas	The Park Theater	10,292 / 10,292	$2,737,700
December 31, 2017	Las Vegas	The Park Theater	10,292 / 10,292	$2,737,700
Leg 5
February 14, 2018	Las Vegas	The Park Theater	20,509 / 20,592	$4,354,719
February 16, 2018	Las Vegas	The Park Theater	20,509 / 20,592	$4,354,719
February 17, 2018	Las Vegas	The Park Theater	20,509 / 20,592	$4,354,719
February 19, 2018	Las Vegas	The Park Theater	20,509 / 20,592	$4,354,719
Leg 6
July 25, 2018	Las Vegas	The Park Theater	15,154 / 15,450	$3,413,843
July 27, 2018	Las Vegas	The Park Theater	15,154 / 15,450	$3,413,843
July 28, 2018	Las Vegas	The Park Theater	15,154 / 15,450	$3,413,843
Leg 7
April 29, 2019	Las Vegas	The Park Theater	20,632 / 20,632	$4,964,826
April 30, 2019	Las Vegas	The Park Theater	20,632 / 20,632	$4,964,826
May 3, 2019	Las Vegas	The Park Theater	20,632 / 20,632	$4,964,826
May 4, 2019	Las Vegas	The Park Theater	20,632 / 20,632	$4,964,826
September 3, 2019	Las Vegas	The Park Theater	36,630 / 36,630	$9,787,031
September 4, 2019	Las Vegas	The Park Theater	36,630 / 36,630	$9,787,031
September 7, 2019	Las Vegas	The Park Theater	36,630 / 36,630	$9,787,031
September 9, 2019	Las Vegas	The Park Theater	36,630 / 36,630	$9,787,031
September 10, 2019	Las Vegas	The Park Theater	36,630 / 36,630	$9,787,031
September 13, 2019	Las Vegas	The Park Theater	36,630 / 36,630	$9,787,031
September 14, 2019	Las Vegas	The Park Theater	36,630 / 36,630	$9,787,031
Leg 8
March 6, 2020	Las Vegas	The Park Theater	10,380 / 10,380	$2,889,112
March 7, 2020	Las Vegas	The Park Theater	10,380 / 10,380	$2,889,112
Leg 9
July 3, 2021	Las Vegas	The Park Theater	59,304 / 59,304	$19,300,000
July 4, 2021	Las Vegas	The Park Theater	59,304 / 59,304	$19,300,000
July 9, 2021	Las Vegas	The Park Theater	59,304 / 59,304	$19,300,000
July 10, 2021	Las Vegas	The Park Theater	59,304 / 59,304	$19,300,000
July 30, 2021	Las Vegas	The Park Theater	59,304 / 59,304	$19,300,000
July 31, 2021	Las Vegas	The Park Theater	59,304 / 59,304	$19,300,000
August 6, 2021	National Harbor	The Theater at MGM National Harbor	59,304 / 59,304	$19,300,000
August 7, 2021	National Harbor	The Theater at MGM National Harbor	59,304 / 59,304	$19,300,000
August 13, 2021	Las Vegas	The Park Theater	59,304 / 59,304	$19,300,000
August 14, 2021	Las Vegas	The Park Theater	59,304 / 59,304	$19,300,000
August 27, 2021	Las Vegas	The Park Theater	59,304 / 59,304	$19,300,000
August 28, 2021	Las Vegas	The Park Theater	59,304 / 59,304	$19,300,000
Leg 10
October 1, 2021	Las Vegas	The Park Theater	10,316 / 10,316	$2,995,739
October 2, 2021	Las Vegas	The Park Theater	10,316 / 10,316	$2,995,739
October 9, 2021	National Harbor	The Theater at MGM National Harbor	5,219 / 5,538	$2,102,128
October 10, 2021	National Harbor	The Theater at MGM National Harbor	5,219 / 5,538	$2,102,128
December 4, 2021	National Harbor	The Theater at MGM National Harbor	5,538 / 5,538	$1,617,335
December 5, 2021	National Harbor	The Theater at MGM National Harbor	5,538 / 5,538	$1,617,335
December 17, 2021	Las Vegas	Dolby Live	10,367 / 10,367	$3,000,043
December 18, 2021	Las Vegas	Dolby Live	10,367 / 10,367	$3,000,043
December 30, 2021	Las Vegas	Dolby Live	10,301 / 10,301	$3,826,375
December 31, 2021	Las Vegas	Dolby Live	10,301 / 10,301	$3,826,375
Leg 11
September 1, 2022	National Harbor	The Theater at MGM National Harbor	N/A	N/A
September 2, 2022	National Harbor	The Theater at MGM National Harbor	N/A	N/A
September 7, 2022	Boston	MGM Music Hall at Fenway	N/A	N/A
September 9, 2022	Boston	MGM Music Hall at Fenway	N/A	N/A
September 11, 2022	Boston	MGM Music Hall at Fenway	N/A	N/A
December 30, 2022	Las Vegas	Dolby Live	11,354 / 11,354	$3,041,615
December 31, 2022	Las Vegas	Dolby Live	11,354 / 11,354	$3,041,615
Leg 12
January 25, 2023	Las Vegas	Dolby Live	15,328 / 15,328	$4,884,371
January 27, 2023	Las Vegas	Dolby Live	15,328 / 15,328	$4,884,371
January 28, 2023	Las Vegas	Dolby Live	15,328 / 15,328	$4,884,371
February 1, 2023	Las Vegas	Dolby Live	15,424 / 15,424	$4,746,784
February 3, 2023	Las Vegas	Dolby Live	15,424 / 15,424	$4,746,784
February 4, 2023	Las Vegas	Dolby Live	15,424 / 15,424	$4,746,784
February 8, 2023	Las Vegas	Dolby Live	20,340 / 20,340	$6,650,083
February 10, 2023	Las Vegas	Dolby Live	20,340 / 20,340	$6,650,083
February 11, 2023	Las Vegas	Dolby Live	20,340 / 20,340	$6,650,083
February 14, 2023	Las Vegas	Dolby Live	20,340 / 20,340	$6,650,083
Leg 13
May 24, 2023	Las Vegas	Dolby Live	15,582 / 15,582	$5,237,691
May 27, 2023	Las Vegas	Dolby Live	15,582 / 15,582	$5,237,691
May 28, 2023	Las Vegas	Dolby Live	15,582 / 15,582	$5,237,691
May 31, 2023	Las Vegas	Dolby Live	15,474 / 15,474	$5,152,249
June 2, 2023	Las Vegas	Dolby Live	15,474 / 15,474	$5,152,249
June 3, 2023	Las Vegas	Dolby Live	15,474 / 15,474	$5,152,249
June 6, 2023	National Harbor	The Theater at MGM National Harbor	N/A	N/A
June 7, 2023	National Harbor	The Theater at MGM National Harbor	N/A	N/A
August 25, 2023	Las Vegas	Dolby Live	10,419 / 10,419	$3,767,384
August 26, 2023	Las Vegas	Dolby Live	10,419 / 10,419	$3,767,384
Leg 14
December 22, 2023	Las Vegas	Dolby Live	10,422/10,422	$3,437,135
December 23, 2023	Las Vegas	Dolby Live	10,422/10,422	$3,437,135
December 28, 2023	Las Vegas	Dolby Live	15,633/15,633	$6,881,714
December 30, 2023	Las Vegas	Dolby Live	15,633/15,633	$6,881,714
December 31, 2023	Las Vegas	Dolby Live	15,633/15,633	$6,881,714
Leg 15
January 6, 2024	Macau	MGM Cotai	N/A	N/A
February 1, 2024	Las Vegas	Dolby Live	25,701/25,701	$9,260,108
February 2, 2024	Las Vegas	Dolby Live	25,701/25,701	$9,260,108
February 5, 2024	Las Vegas	Dolby Live	25,701/25,701	$9,260,108
February 7, 2024	Las Vegas	Dolby Live	25,701/25,701	$9,260,108
February 9, 2024	Las Vegas	Dolby Live	25,701/25,701	$9,260,108
Leg 16
June 7, 2024	Las Vegas	Dolby Live	26,416/26,416	$10,224,636
June 8, 2024	Las Vegas	Dolby Live	26,416/26,416	$10,224,636
June 12, 2024	Las Vegas	Dolby Live	26,416/26,416	$10,224,636
June 14, 2024	Las Vegas	Dolby Live	26,416/26,416	$10,224,636
June 15, 2024	Las Vegas	Dolby Live	26,416/26,416	$10,224,636
August 20, 2024	Las Vegas	Dolby Live	37,121/37,121	$14,329,143
August 23, 2024	Las Vegas	Dolby Live	37,121/37,121	$14,329,143
August 24, 2024	Las Vegas	Dolby Live	37,121/37,121	$14,329,143
August 27, 2024	Las Vegas	Dolby Live	37,121/37,121	$14,329,143
August 28, 2024	Las Vegas	Dolby Live	37,121/37,121	$14,329,143
August 31, 2024	Las Vegas	Dolby Live	37,121/37,121	$14,329,143
September 1, 2024	Las Vegas	Dolby Live	37,121/37,121	$14,329,143
Leg 17
December 18, 2024	Las Vegas	Dolby Live	31,900/31,900	$16,000,000
December 20, 2024	Las Vegas	Dolby Live	31,900/31,900	$16,000,000
December 21, 2024	Las Vegas	Dolby Live	31,900/31,900	$16,000,000
December 27, 2024	Las Vegas	Dolby Live	31,900/31,900	$16,000,000
December 30, 2024	Las Vegas	Dolby Live	31,900/31,900	$16,000,000
December 31, 2024	Las Vegas	Dolby Live	31,900/31,900	$16,000,000
Leg 18
May 21, 2025	Las Vegas	Dolby Live	37,086/37,086	$17,336,903
May 24, 2025	Las Vegas	Dolby Live	37,086/37,086	$17,336,903
May 25, 2025	Las Vegas	Dolby Live	37,086/37,086	$17,336,903
May 28, 2025	Las Vegas	Dolby Live	37,086/37,086	$17,336,903
May 30, 2025	Las Vegas	Dolby Live	37,086/37,086	$17,336,903
May 31, 2025	Las Vegas	Dolby Live	37,086/37,086	$17,336,903
June 2, 2025	Las Vegas	Dolby Live	37,086/37,086	$17,336,903
Leg 19
August 22, 2025	Las Vegas	Dolby Live	47,655/47,655	$18,626,764
August 23, 2025	Las Vegas	Dolby Live	47,655/47,655	$18,626,764
August 26, 2025	Las Vegas	Dolby Live	47,655/47,655	$18,626,764
August 27, 2025	Las Vegas	Dolby Live	47,655/47,655	$18,626,764
August 30, 2025	Las Vegas	Dolby Live	47,655/47,655	$18,626,764
August 31, 2025	Las Vegas	Dolby Live	47,655/47,655	$18,626,764
September 3, 2025	Las Vegas	Dolby Live	47,655/47,655	$18,626,764
September 5, 2025	Las Vegas	Dolby Live	47,655/47,655	$18,626,764
September 6, 2025	Las Vegas	Dolby Live	47,655/47,655	$18,626,764
Leg 20
December 30, 2025	Las Vegas	Dolby Live	N/A	N/A
December 31, 2025	Las Vegas	Dolby Live	N/A	N/A
Total			549,302 / 549,302	$183,764,912

== Cancelled and rescheduled shows ==
=== Cancelled shows ===
List of cancelled concerts, showing date, city, venue and reason for cancellation
Date	City	Venue	Reason
April 20, 2020	Las Vegas	The Park Theater	COVID-19 pandemic
April 24, 2020	Las Vegas	The Park Theater	COVID-19 pandemic
April 25, 2020	Las Vegas	The Park Theater	COVID-19 pandemic

=== Rescheduled shows ===
List of rescheduled concerts, showing date, city, venue and reason for rescheduling
Date	City	Venue	Reason
July 23, 2021	Las Vegas	The Park Theater	Unforeseen circumstances
July 24, 2021	Las Vegas	The Park Theater	Unforeseen circumstances

== Personnel ==
Credits adapted from:

- Chris Rabold – FOH engineer
- Chris "Sully" Sullivan – L-Acoustics support
- Ramon Morales – monitor engineer

== See also ==
- List of Billboard Boxscore number-one concert series of the 2020s
- List of highest-grossing concert series at a single venue
