= Dolby Live =

Indoor amphitheater on the grounds of the Park MGM in Las Vegas, Nevada, United States

Coordinates: 36.104328°N 115.174472°W

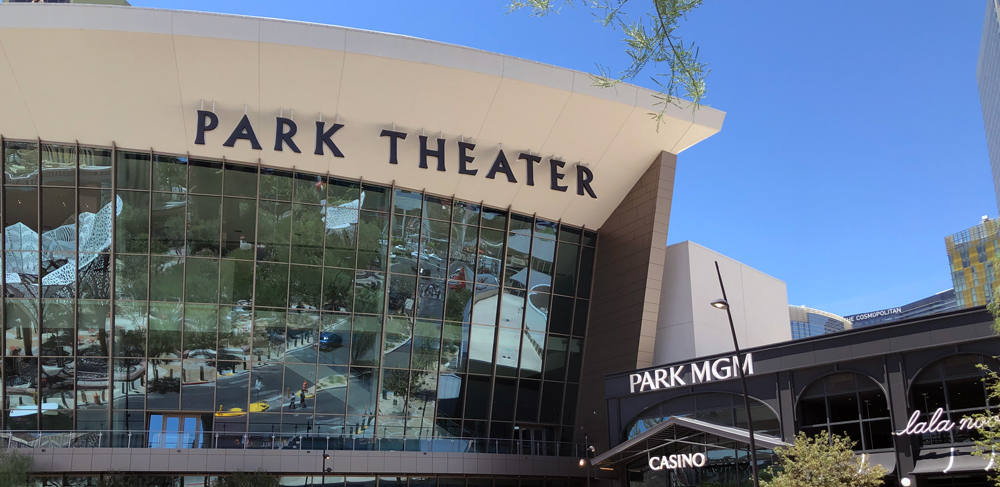
- Exterior of the venue (2019)
- Full name: Dolby Live at the Park MGM
- Former names: MGM Resorts Theater (planning/construction); MCR Concert Hall (planning/construction); Park Theater (2016-21)
- Address: 3770 S Las Vegas Blvd; Paradise, NV 89109; United States
- Location: Park MGM
- Owner: MGM Resorts International
- Operator: AEG
- Capacity: 6,400; 5,169 (residency shows)

Construction
- Groundbreaking: November 2, 2015
- Opened: December 17, 2016
- Cost: $90 million ($122 million in 2025 dollars)
- Architect: Marnell Companies
- General contractor: Martin-Harris Construction

Website
- Venue Website

Dolby Live (formerly Park Theater) is an indoor amphitheater on the grounds of the Park MGM casino hotel in Paradise, Nevada, United States. Opening in December 2016, the theater primarily hosts concerts and residencies and is the second-largest theater on the Las Vegas Strip. The theater sits adjacent to the T-Mobile Arena and Paramount+ Plaza.

== Description ==
The theater was announced in July 2015, as part of the mass redevelopment of the aging Monte Carlo Resort and Casino. Spearheaded by MGM Resorts International and AEG, construction began November 2, 2015 on the "MGM Resorts Theater" (later known as the "MCR Concert Hall" before settling on its current name) at the site of the former Lance Burton Theatre. After one year of construction, the $90 million theatre opened on December 17, 2016, with a concert by Stevie Nicks.

The theater boasts a capacity of 6,400 (5,200 for residency shows), making it the second largest theater on the Strip after PH Live.

The venue is 150,000 square feet with a 135'x40' stage and 7,500 square foot proscenium arch. The theatre was designed ensuring the back row was only 145 feet from the stage. It also includes an 80'x40' 4K-LED screen.

In October 2021, the theater was renamed "Dolby Live" as part of a naming rights agreement with Dolby. As part of the agreement, the theater's sound system was upgraded to use Dolby Atmos, making it the first performance venue to use such technology.

== Performance history ==
=== Headliners ===
Performer	Show	Length
Bruno Mars	Bruno Mars at Park MGM	2016–2025
Lady Gaga	Enigma + Jazz & Piano	2018–2024
Aerosmith	Deuces Are Wild	2019–2020; 2022
Janet Jackson	Metamorphosis	May–August 2019
Ricky Martin	All In	2017–18
Cher	Classic Cher	2017–2020
Jonas Brothers	Jonas Brothers in Vegas	Cancelled
Jonas Brothers	Live in Las Vegas	2022
Stevie Wonder	Steve Wonder's Song Party: A Celebration of Life, Love & Music	August 2018
Queen + Adam Lambert	Crown Jewels	September 2018
Britney Spears	Domination	Cancelled
Silk Sonic	An Evening with Silk Sonic at Park MGM	2022
Usher	Usher: The Vegas Residency	2022
Maroon 5	Maroon 5: The Las Vegas Residency	2023–2025
Mariah Carey	The Celebration of Mimi	2024
Los Bukis	La Residencia Las Vegas	2024
Sammy Hagar		2025
Mary J. Blige	Mary J. Blige: My Life, My Story	2026

=== Concerts ===
Date	Performer(s)	Show/Tour
December 17, 2016	Stevie Nicks	24 Karat Gold Tour
December 24, 2016	Fish Leong	—N/a
December 25, 2016	Mansour; Arash	Arash and Mansour: Live in Concert
January 29, 2017	Richie Jen; Steve Wong; Edmond Leung; William So	—N/a
March 25, 2017	Il Volo	Notte Magica: A Tribute to the Three Tenors
April 2, 2017	Russell Dickerson; Chris Janson; Tracy Lawrence; RaeLynn; Clay Walker	ACM Awards Official After Party
April 21, 2017	Hans Zimmer	Revealed
April 28, 2017	Brett Eldredge	—N/a
June 9, 2017	The Doobie Brothers; Chicago	2017 North American Tour
June 17, 2017	Boston	Hyperspace Tour
July 21, 2017	Kenny Rogers	The Gambler's Last Deal
July 22, 2017	Lindsey Buckingham; Christine McVie	Lindsey Buckingham and Christine McVie: Live in Concert
September 9, 2017	Jonathan Lee	—N/a
September 30, 2017	DMX; Eve; The Lox; Swizz Beatz; Drag-On	Ruff Ryders Reunion: 20th Anniversary Tour
January 12, 2018	Frankie Valli and the Four Seasons	A Special Evening with Frankie Valli and the Four Seasons
January 13, 2018	Frankie Valli and the Four Seasons	A Special Evening with Frankie Valli and the Four Seasons
February 24, 2018	Kadim Al-Saher; Najwa Karam	—N/a
February 25, 2018	G-Eazy	Beautiful & Damned Tour
March 10, 2018	311	—N/a
April 7, 2018	Gloria Trevi; Alejandra Guzmán	—N/a
June 22, 2018	Post Malone	Beerbongs & Bentleys Tour
July 21, 2018	Logic	Booby Tarantino vs Everybody Tour
October 5, 2018	Dropkick Murphys	Fall Tour 2018
October 10, 2018	Central Live	Central Church
October 13, 2018	Sting; Shaggy	44/876 Tour
October 27, 2018	Widespread Panic	—N/a
October 28, 2018	Widespread Panic	—N/a
October 29, 2018	Widespread Panic	—N/a
October 31, 2018 - February 21, 2020	Cher	Classic Cher
November 24, 2018	Rene Liu	—N/a
December 5, 2018	Thirty Seconds to Mars; Bishop Briggs; Robert DeLong; Grandson; The Crystal Method	Holiday Havoc
December 15, 2018	Kane Brown	Live Forever Tour
July 19, 2019	Beck; Cage the Elephant	Night is Running Tour
July 20, 2019	Why Don't We	8 Letters Tour
March 11–13, 2020	311	311 Day
August 6, 2021	Joe Bonamassa	—N/a
August 20–21, 2021	Jonas Brothers	Remember This Tour
December 2 & 4, 2021	Foo Fighters	—N/a
December 9–11, 2021	Jason Aldean	Back in the Saddle Tour
February 4–5, 2022	Garth Brooks	The One Man Show
March 11–12, 2022	311	311 Day
November 4–5, 2022	The Who	The Who Hits Back Tour
December 24-25, 2022	A-Mei	aMEI ASMR World Tour
September 15-17, 2023	Luis Miguel	Luis Miguel Tour 2023-2024
March 1, 2024	Dave Matthews Band	-
