= Park MGM =

Casino hotel in Paradise, Nevada

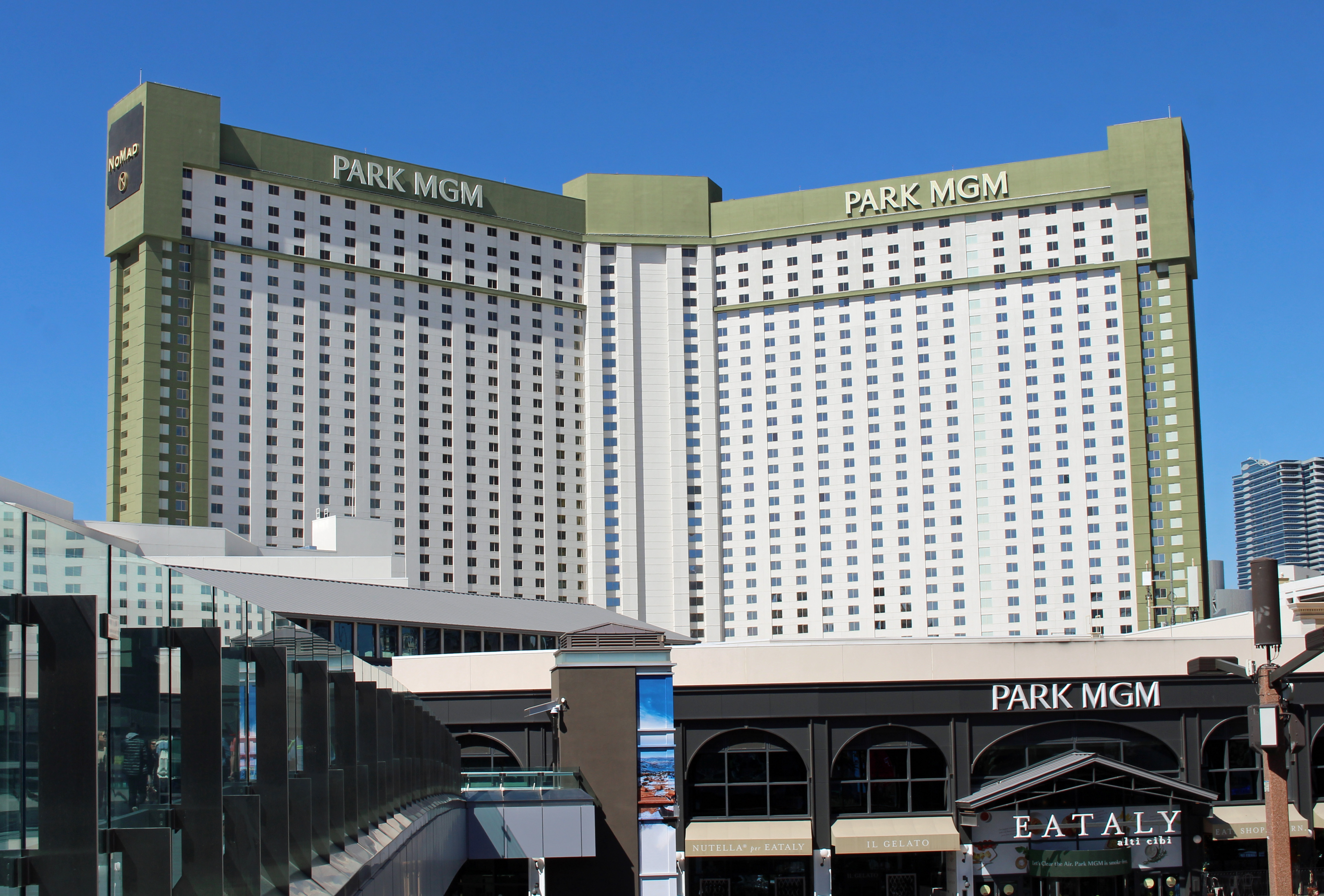
- Park MGM as seen in 2023

- Location within Las Vegas Strip Location within Nevada
- Interactive map of Park MGM
- Location: Paradise, Nevada, U.S.; 3770 South Las Vegas Boulevard; 36°06′17″N 115°10′34″W
- Opened: June 21, 1996; 30 years ago
- No. of rooms: 2,993 (Note: Including 2,700 at Park MGM and 293 at The Reserve at Park MGM.)
- Gaming space: 76,982 sq ft (7,151.9 m^{2})
- Signature attractions: Dolby Live; Blue Man Theatre (2012–2015)
- Notable restaurants: Bavette's Steakhouse; Eataly; Primrose
- Casino type: Land-based
- Owner: Vici Properties
- Operating license holder: MGM Resorts International
- Previous names: Monte Carlo Resort and Casino
- Renovated in: 2009, 2016–2018
- Website: parkmgm.com

Park MGM, formerly Monte Carlo Resort and Casino, is a megaresort hotel and casino on the Las Vegas Strip in Paradise, Nevada, United States. It is owned by Vici Properties and operated by MGM Resorts International. It was developed by Mirage Resorts and Circus Circus Enterprises, both later acquired by MGM.

The resort opened as the Monte Carlo on June 21, 1996. Its design was based on the Monte Carlo Casino in Monaco. In January 2008, a fire occurred on the rooftop of the 32-story hotel. The fire, caused by welding, forced the evacuation and closure of the Monte Carlo, and 13 people were treated for smoke inhalation. The resort lost nearly $100 million because of the fire, including damage and lost revenue from the closure. It reopened three weeks later. The top floor suffered water damage and received a total renovation, reopening as Hotel32 in August 2009. It operated as a hotel-within-a-hotel, offering 50 rooms.

In June 2016, MGM announced that it would renovate the Monte Carlo and rebrand it as Park MGM, with the name change taking effect on May 9, 2018. The two-year renovation, costing more than $550 million, concluded in December 2018. Hotel32 was removed, and the top four floors of the tower were rebranded as NoMad Las Vegas, a new hotel-within-a-hotel; it was renamed The Reserve at Park MGM in December 2025. Park MGM includes a 76,982-square-foot (7,200 m^{2}) casino and 2,700 rooms, not counting another 293 at The Reserve, which brings the total to 2,993.

Magician Lance Burton served as the Monte Carlo's longtime headliner, entertaining in the 1,200-seat Lance Burton Theatre from 1996 to 2010. A new venue, the Park Theater, opened in 2016 and has since been renamed Dolby Live. The theater seats 5,200, and was built on the former site of the Lance Burton Theatre.

== History ==
Park MGM originally operated as the Monte Carlo. A portion of the resort's land was once occupied by the Desert Rose motel, opened in 1953. Another portion of the future resort site was occupied by a golf course, built in the 1960s, for the nearby Dunes hotel-casino.

=== Monte Carlo (1996–2018) ===
Mirage Resorts purchased the Dunes and its golf course in November 1992, and closed them both a couple months later. In May 1994, Mirage and Gold Strike Resorts announced a joint venture to build a then-unnamed resort on part of the former golf course. The Desert Rose was also purchased and demolished to make way for the resort.

Monte Carlo logo

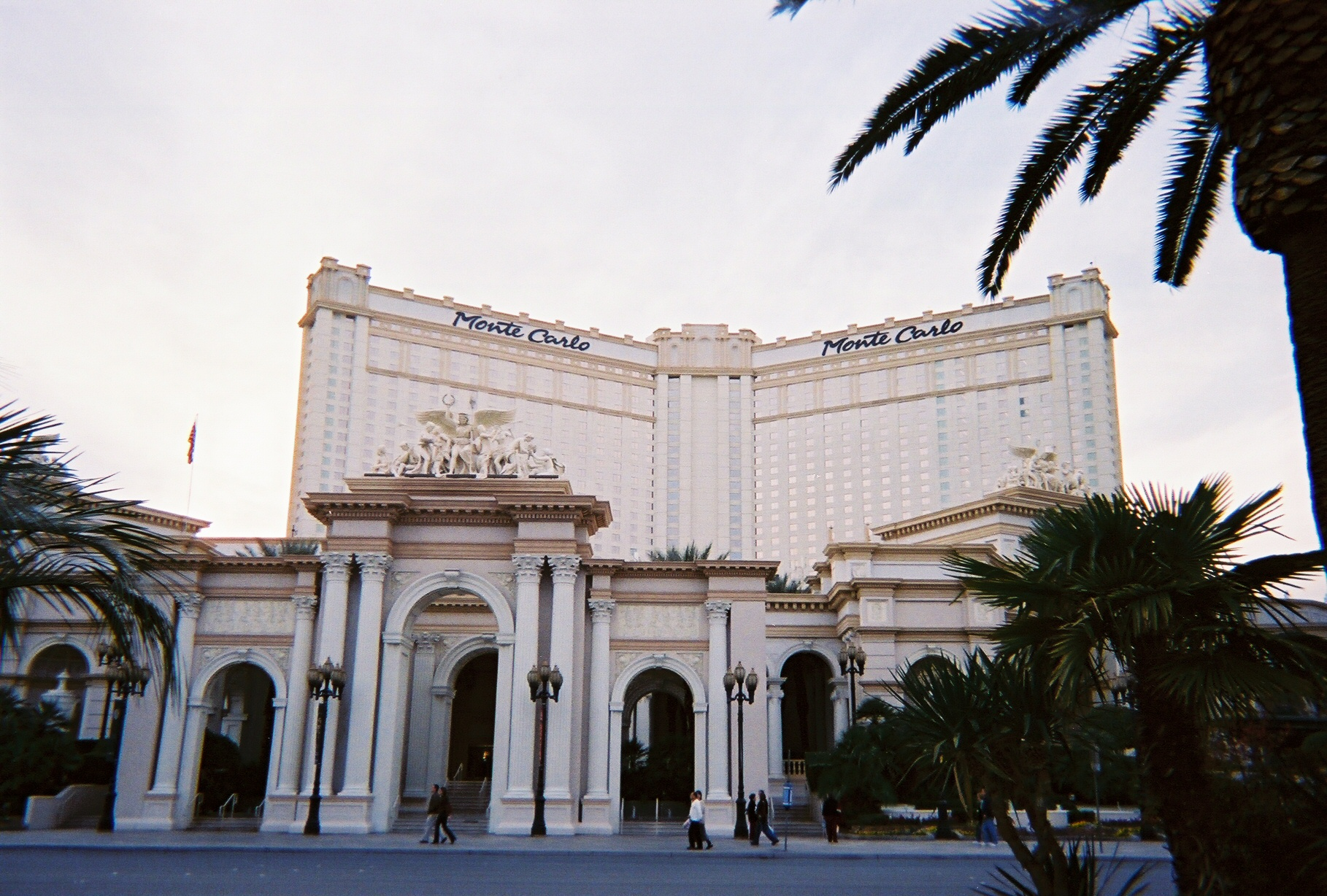

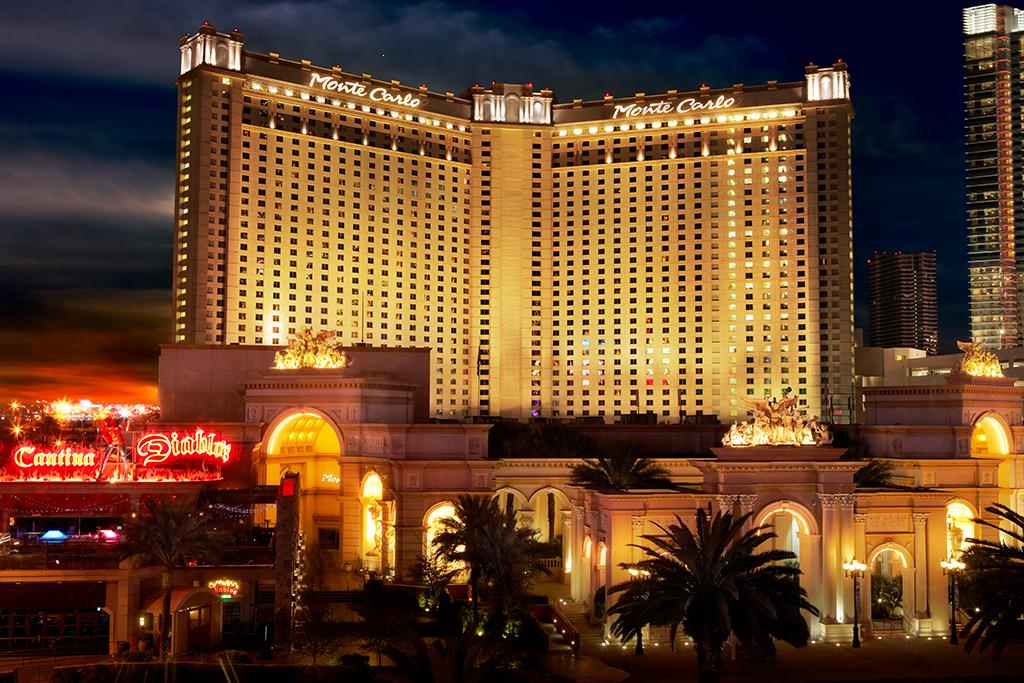
Monte Carlo in the late 2000s

Ground was broken in March 1995. Circus Circus Enterprises acquired Gold Strike three months later and took over its role of managing the project. Gold Strike had hoped to name the project the Grand Victoria, the same name as the casino being developed by the company in Illinois, but that idea was discarded because of potential confusion with the MGM Grand. "Victoria" and "Victoria Bay" were reported as likely names. Details about the property were revealed in July 1995, including that it would be named the Monte Carlo and feature Belle Époque architecture, based on the unaffiliated Monte Carlo Casino in Monaco.

The Monte Carlo opened to the public at midnight on June 21, 1996, following an invitation-only pre-opening celebration, including a fireworks show. Originally proposed as a $250 million project, the final cost ballooned up to $344 million.

The resort aimed for mass appeal, offering European luxury rooms to middle-income guests, whereas the Monte Carlo in Monaco is tailored to high rollers. The Las Vegas property became popular among tourists as a second-choice hotel, handling overflow from other resorts. As of 2009, the Monte Carlo print advertising campaign featured intentionally misspelled French words ("tray sheek") coupled with glamorous images. The campaign's tagline was "Unpretentiously luxurious".

Mirage and Circus Circus split the resort's profits, and operations were overseen by the latter company. MGM Grand, Inc. acquired Mirage in 2000, forming MGM Mirage and acquiring 50-percent ownership of the Monte Carlo. MGM acquired the other half in 2005, after purchasing Mandalay Resort Group (formerly Circus Circus Enterprises).

==== 2008 fire ====
The rooftop of the hotel's 32-story tower contains most of the resort's air-conditioning, as well as electrical equipment. An architectural facade, measuring three stories, was built along the top of the tower to hide the rooftop machinery. The facade was part of the resort's original construction. It was made with a foam known as exterior insulation finishing system (EIFS), which is widely used, including on other resorts along the Las Vegas Strip.

A three-alarm rooftop fire began on January 25, 2008, shortly before 11:00 a.m. Approximately 120 firefighters responded to the blaze, which was put out by 12:15 p.m. Certain parts of the fire could not be reached from the roof; in these cases, firefighters instead had to break open hotel-room windows to reach the flames.

The Monte Carlo had been occupied by approximately 5,000 guests and 950 employees when the fire broke out. The entire resort was evacuated and closed indefinitely until repairs could take place. Thirteen people were treated for smoke inhalation. The evacuation process was generally praised by experts. Local fire safety protocols, adopted after the 1980 MGM Grand fire, were credited for the organized evacuation and minimal injuries. However, some guests complained of a delay in initiating the evacuations, and others said they initially did not hear any fire alarms; the alarms only activate on floors where smoke is detected, as well as the floors immediately above and below. Evacuated hotel guests were offered accommodations at MGM's other Strip properties.

Much of the fire damage occurred to the hotel tower's upper exterior, which was left blackened. Large chunks of EIFS fell from the tower; the structure was built according to the 1991 Uniform Building Code, which allowed a thicker amount of foam compared with modern standards. A later analysis found that a non-approved resin had been used in two areas along the roof during initial construction, which helped spread the fire at a faster rate. Many rooms also suffered water damage and had to be stripped down for repair work, which began a day after the fire.

Welding had been taking place on the roof and was the cause of the fire. A team of contractors had been cutting steel for a walkway along the roof's edge, to be installed for window-washing. Pieces of molten steel fell onto the roof, sparking a fire which spread to the facade. According to fire officials, the workers had failed to acquire a permit for their work and failed to use a slag mat, designed to catch molten drippings. The contracting company said its welders had a permit and worked safely and responsibly.

Because the fire was determined to be accidental, no citations were issued by the fire department. The Occupational Safety and Health Administration fined the contractor $18,000, alleging it broke nine workplace safety laws. However, the agency's review board overturned nearly all of the citations, while acknowledging that the contractor failed to take necessary precautions to prevent the fire spread.

Revenue losses were initially estimated at $1.1 million for each day of the Monte Carlo's closure. The resort ultimately lost nearly $100 million because of the fire, including damage and lost revenue from the closure. However, company losses were minimal due to MGM's portfolio of Strip properties. The fire also had no negative impact on other businesses along the Strip, which operated as normal. The Monte Carlo partially reopened on February 15, 2008, and much of the property was operational within a week.

=== Park MGM (2018–present) ===
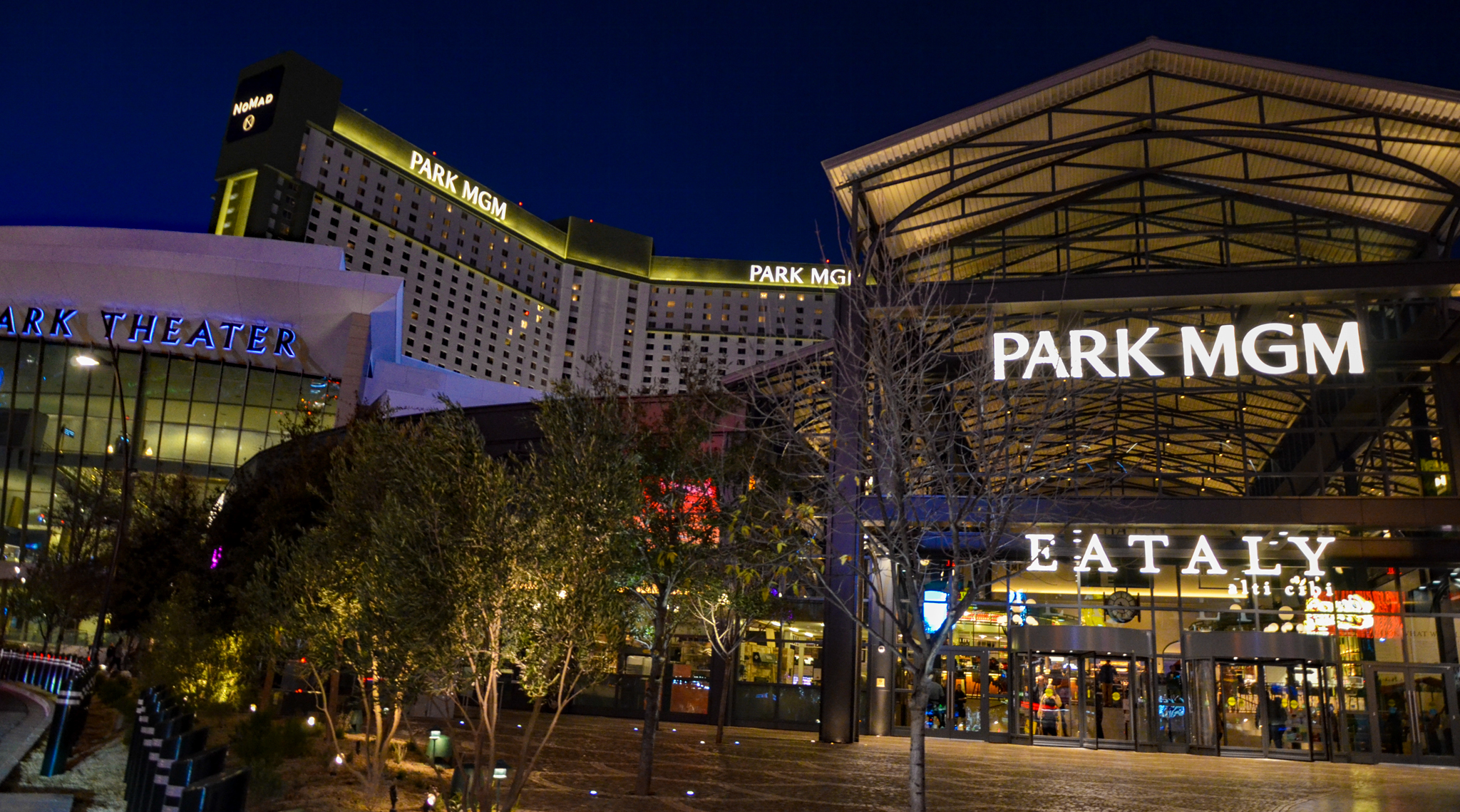
The rebranded Park MGM in 2019

In 2015, construction was underway on MGM's nearby T-Mobile Arena. The Monte Carlo was viewed as the gateway to the venue, prompting MGM to consider renaming the resort, which was seen as underutilized. The Park, a dining and entertainment district, opened in April 2016. Built in between the Monte Carlo and New York-New York, it serves as the Strip entrance to T-Mobile Arena. At the time, MGM chairman and chief executive officer Jim Murren said about the Monte Carlo, "We are not going to name it something from somewhere else. Those days are over. This is Las Vegas; we are at the top of the list of entertainment cities. We are not second to anybody. We're not going to have a property themed after a city from a far-away place."

In June 2016, MGM announced that the Monte Carlo would be rebranded as Park MGM, a reference to The Park. The resort received a two-year renovation which took place in phases, allowing the property to remain open. The name change took effect on May 9, 2018, although construction remained ongoing. Renovations took place throughout the entire resort, and cost more than $550 million, before concluding in December 2018.

During 2016, ownership of the Monte Carlo and other MGM properties was transferred to MGM Growth Properties (later acquired by Vici Properties in 2022), while MGM Resorts continued to operate it under a lease agreement.

Nevada casinos were ordered to close in March 2020, due to the COVID-19 pandemic and its effects on the state. Nevada casinos began reopening a few months later. When Park MGM reopened on September 30, 2020, it instituted a non-smoking policy, becoming the only casino resort on the Strip to be smoke-free. This was done to attract a non-smoking clientele who dislike the cigarette smoke that is typically associated with casinos. The timing for such a decision was considered appropriate, as there was support for smoke-free policies amid the pandemic. The non-smoking policy had previously been considered two years earlier, until MGM passed on the idea. Smoking is still permitted in designated outdoor areas.

== Features ==
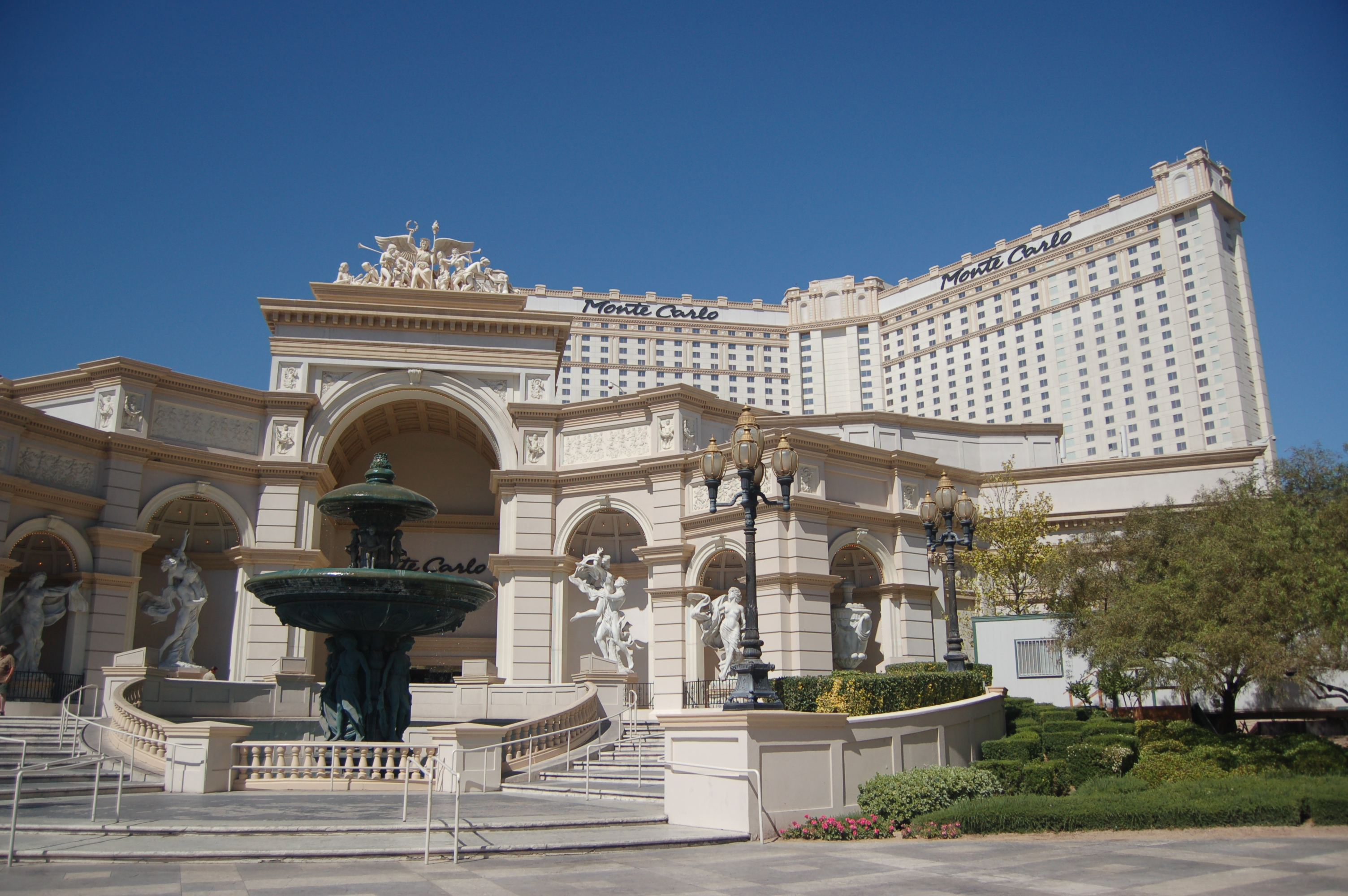
Monte Carlo facade, 2008

Park MGM includes a 76,982 sq ft (7,151.9 m^{2}) casino. Upon its initial opening in 1996, it featured 2,200 slot machines, 95 table games, a high-limit gaming area, a race and sports book, and a bingo room with seating for 550.

The resort interior included the Street of Dreams, a French-themed area featuring cobblestone walkways, gas lights, and gargoyles. The property featured 22,000 sq ft (2,000 m^{2}) of retail space divided into three sections, including the Street of Dreams. The facade along the Strip featured fountains, staircases and arches. This was removed in 2013, making way for restaurant space.

The resort's pool area included a wave pool and lazy river. The CityCenter Tram was added in 2009, connecting Monte Carlo with two other MGM properties, CityCenter and the Bellagio. The poker room was closed in 2017, as the Bellagio and CityCenter already offered such facilities. As Park MGM, the resort updated its sports book to resemble a sports bar and offer food. The updated property also added 77,000 sq ft (7,200 m^{2}) of convention space.

In 2018, Houston Hospitality opened On the Record, an 11,000 sq ft (1,000 m^{2}) speakeasy and nightclub. It has capacity for approximately 1,000 people, and includes a double-decker bus converted into a DJ booth. In 2019, restaurateur Bricia Lopez opened Mama Rabbit, a bar specializing in tequila and mezcal. The name is a reference to Mayahuel, a female deity who is mother to a group of rabbits known as the Centzon Tōtōchtin.

=== Hotels ===
The Monte Carlo opened with 3,014 rooms, and now has 2,700 as Park MGM.

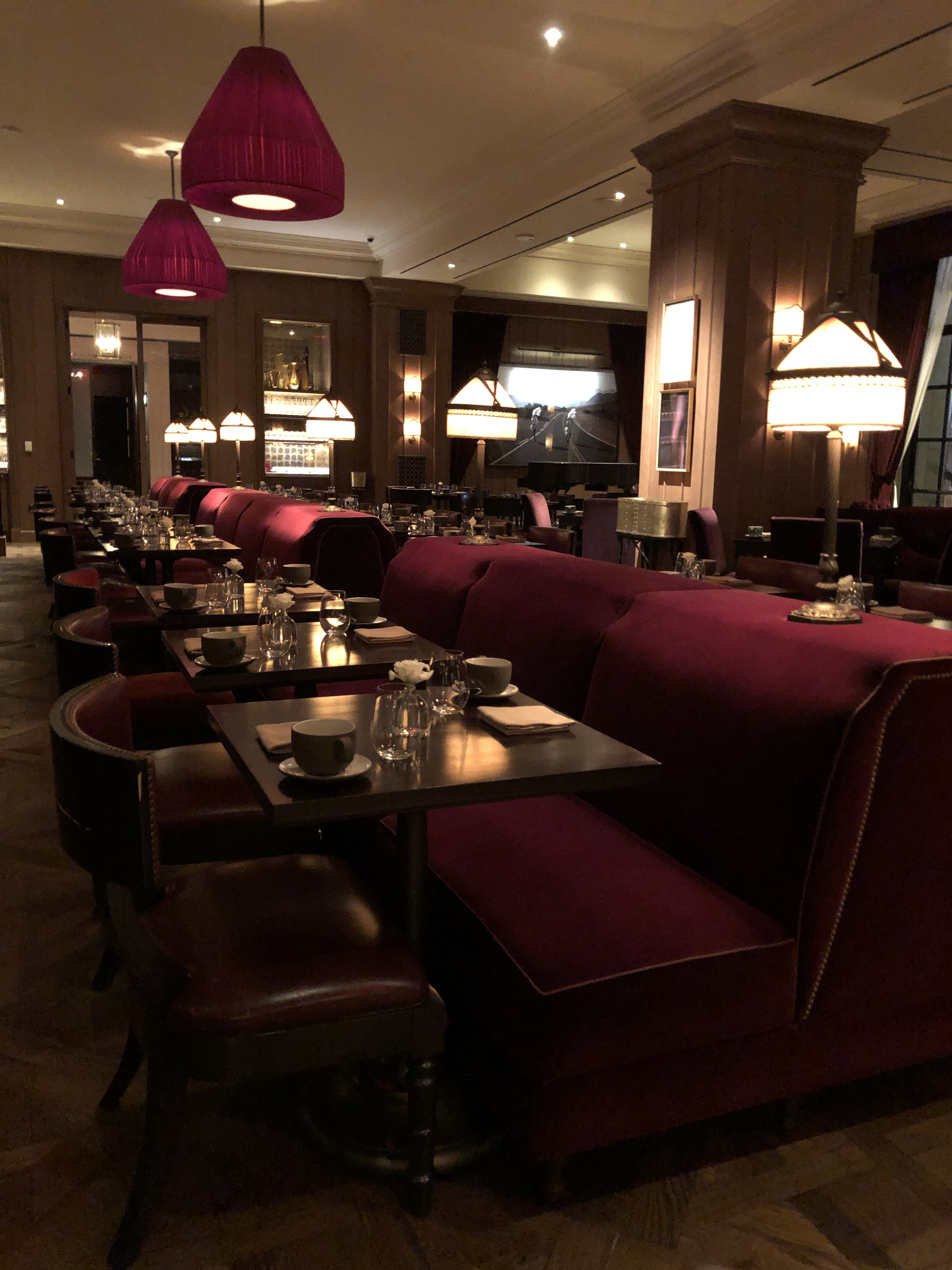
NoMad Bar

Following the 2008 fire, the 32nd floor was stripped down in order to repair water damage. The entire floor was renovated and rebranded as Hotel32. A renovation of the floor had already been planned at the time of the fire, and the incident prompted a complete rebuild. Hotel32 opened on August 10, 2009. Deemed a hotel-within-a-hotel, it was aimed at a higher-end clientele compared to the Monte Carlo, with room rates going up to $6,000 per night. The hotel had 50 rooms, including suites and penthouses. Rooms featured an assistant, limo service, and Wii gaming consoles. The floor also included Lounge32, overlooking CityCenter.

The Park MGM conversion removed Hotel32 for a new hotel-within-a-hotel. The top four floors were rebranded as NoMad Las Vegas through a partnership with the Sydell Group, which owned the NoMad hotel in New York City. Discussions with Sydell had been ongoing for three years before the partnership was announced in 2016. NoMad Las Vegas had a soft opening on October 12, 2018, and most of its amenities were fully operational a month later.

NoMad was considered separate from Park MGM, with its own lobby and pool. NoMad rooms were designed to resemble urban apartments, and were higher priced compared with those at Park MGM. The hotel included a ground level casino, bar, and restaurant. The NoMad's casino featured the only high-limit gaming area on the property, and a Tiffany glass ceiling was retained from when the area operated as part of the Monte Carlo.

NoMad Las Vegas was rebranded The Reserve at Park MGM on December 17, 2025. The Park MGM property has a total of 2,993 rooms, including 293 at The Reserve.

=== Restaurants ===
The Monte Carlo opened with six restaurants, including a 250-seat steakhouse and a 700-seat buffet featuring a Moroccan design. In addition, it offered a 210-seat food court. It also featured the Monte Carlo brewery and pub, which sold its own beers. It rebranded as The Pub in 2009, and removed its microbrewery; construction of the adjacent CityCenter forced the removal of the large brewing tanks in order to create more room.

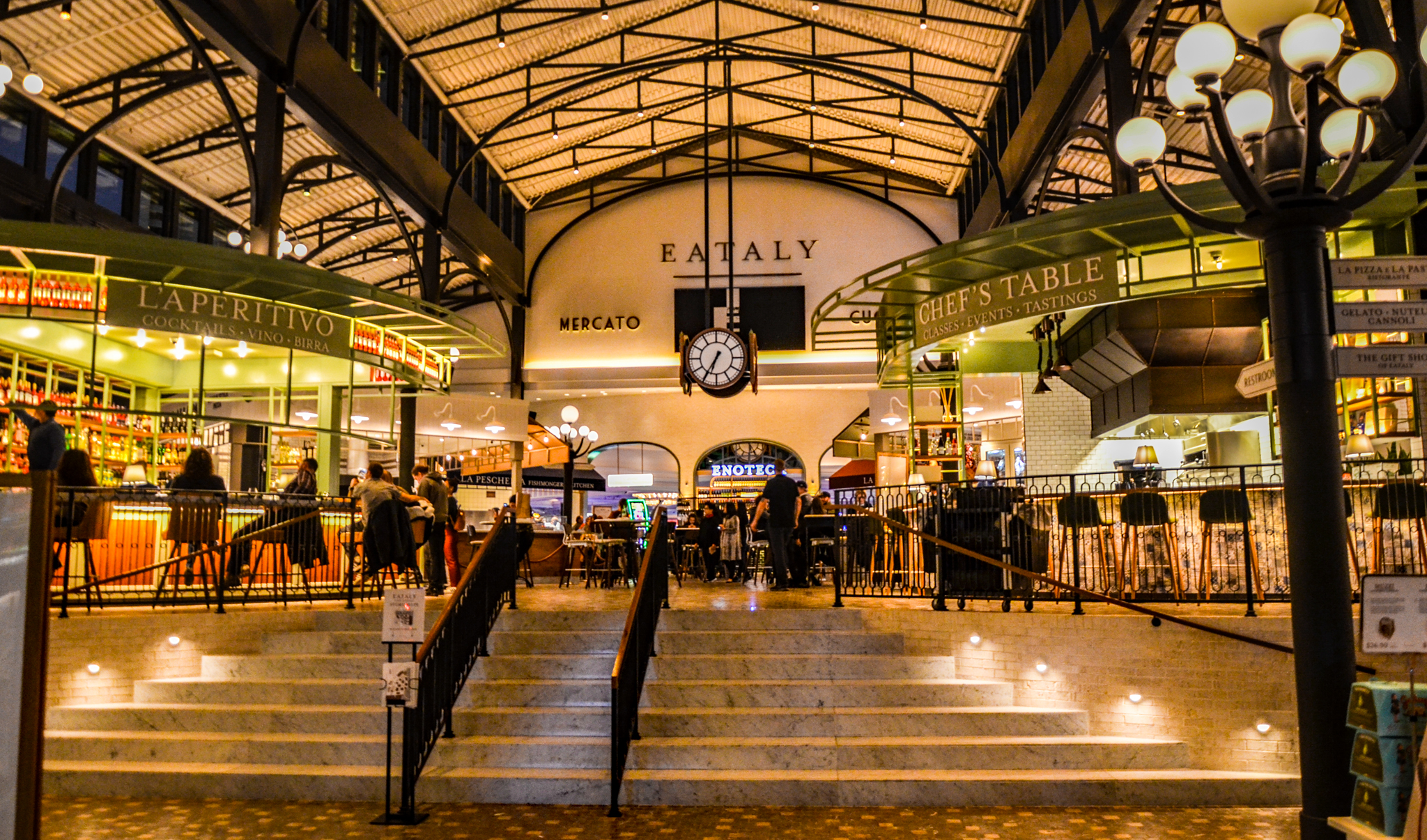
Eataly at Park MGM

Dragon Noodle Co. & Sushi Bar debuted with the Monte Carlo. It was remodeled in 2009 and updated to include cocktail waitresses dressed as anime characters. In 2008, the resort debuted Brand, a 5,000 sq ft (460 m^{2}) steakhouse by The Light Group, while an ice bar opened two years later.

Several restaurants, as well as the ice bar, closed in 2017 to make way for new eateries, part of the Park MGM conversion. Two new restaurants opened in 2017: Bavette's Steakhouse & Bar, which originated in Chicago; and Primrose, a French restaurant seating more than 300. Also added was Eataly, part of a chain of Italian restaurants. MGM had tried for 10 years to bring the chain to one of its Strip resorts. Chef Roy Choi opened Best Friend, his first Las Vegas restaurant, at the end of 2018.

== Live entertainment ==
Magician Lance Burton headlined at the Monte Carlo from its opening until September 4, 2010. He had previously performed at the Hacienda resort, also on the Strip, since 1991. Burton originally signed a 13-year contract with the Monte Carlo, which built him a 1,200-seat venue known as the Lance Burton Theatre. His show was successful, closely associating him with the Monte Carlo. In 2009, Burton signed an extension with the resort for up to six years. However, he departed the property in 2010, due to disagreements with resort management. Burton had reportedly been asked to reduce his budget, to which he replied that he would rather end the show.

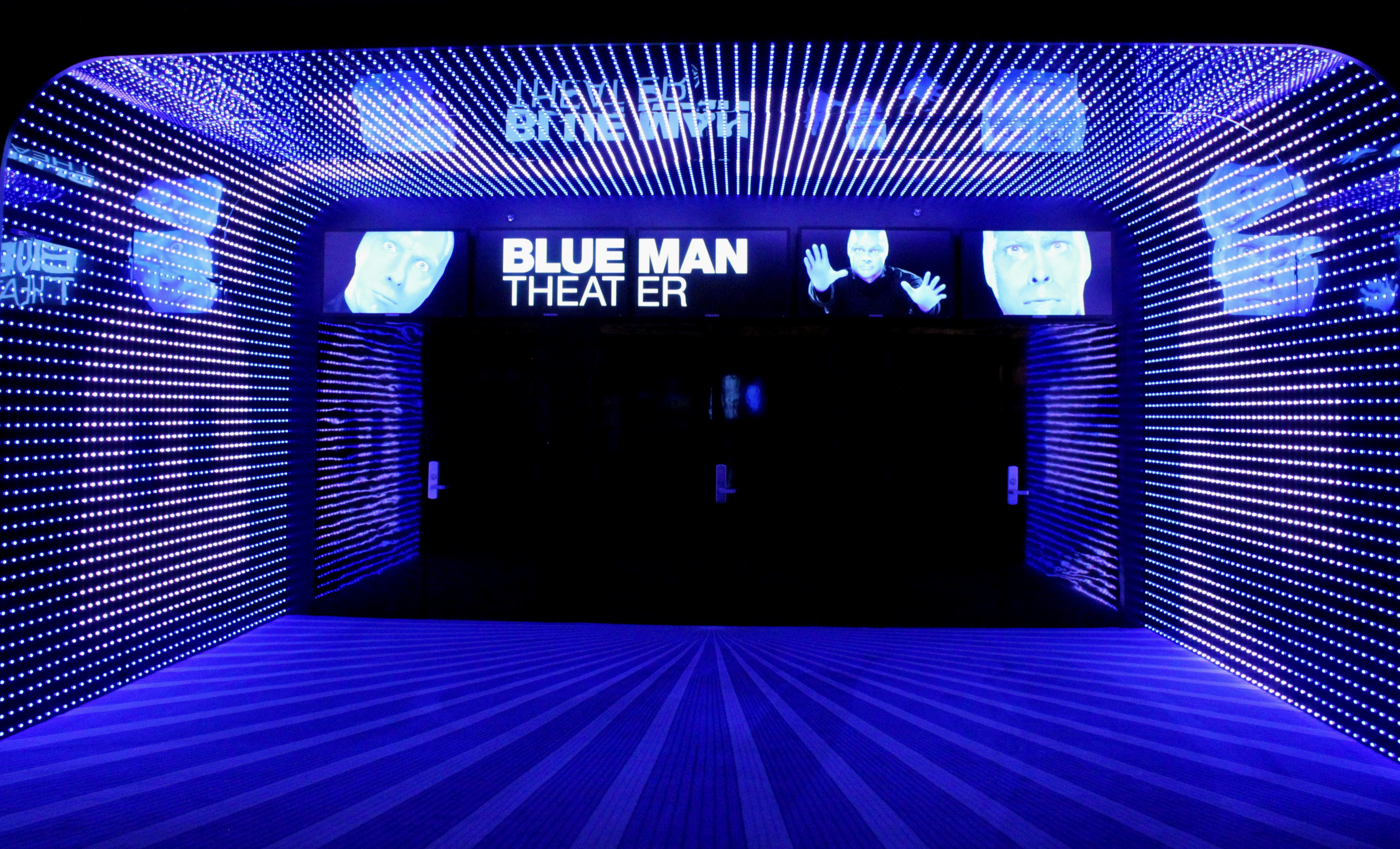
The Blue Man Theater

Other entertainers in the Lance Burton Theatre included comedian Frank Caliendo, who performed there from 2009 to 2011. Following Burton's departure, the Jabbawockeez dance crew began performance of their residency at Monte Carlo, entitled "MÜS.I.C". It took place in Burton's former venue, renamed the Monte Carlo Theater. In early 2011, it was announced that the Blue Man Group would renovate and take over the venue. The Jabbawockeez relocated to a temporary tent structure on the Monte Carlo property, with seating for 867. As scheduled, the Jabbawockeez departed the resort in 2013. The Blue Man Group performed at Monte Carlo from October 2012 to October 2015.

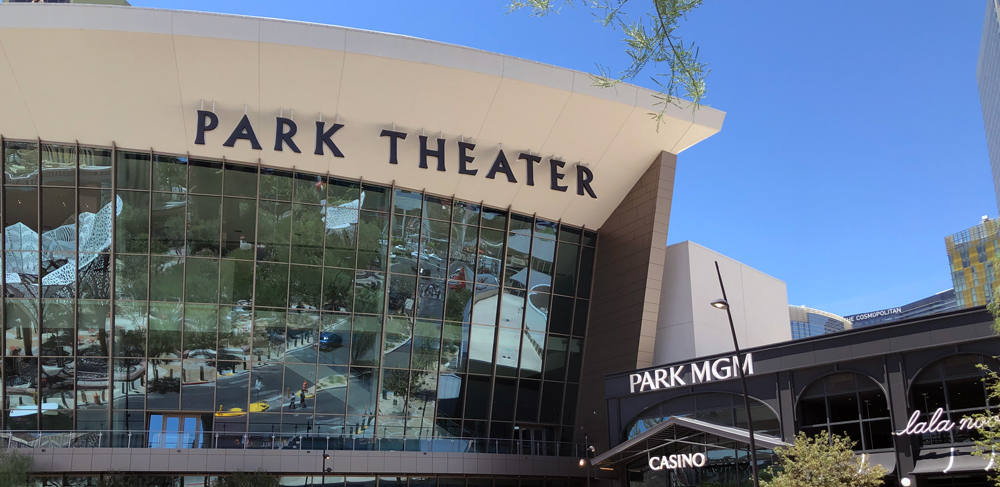
The Park Theater (now Dolby Live) in 2019

In 2015, as part of the Park MGM conversion, construction began on a new 5,200-seat venue known as the Park Theater. The former Lance Burton venue was demolished to make way for the Park Theater, which opened on December 17, 2016. It was renamed Dolby Live in October 2021, in partnership with Dolby. The theater has had residencies by Ricky Martin (All In), Cher (Classic Cher), Lady Gaga (Enigma), Aerosmith (Deuces Are Wild), Maroon 5, New Kids on the Block, and the first concert residency by Janet Jackson (Metamorphosis).

== In popular culture ==
The Monte Carlo made several media appearances, including the films Dance with Me (1998), and Dodgeball: A True Underdog Story (2004). It was also in the television series The X-Files, serving as the main location in the season six episode "Three of a Kind" (1999). In the finale of The Amazing Race 15 (2009), teams had to count out $1 million worth of poker chips at the Monte Carlo to receive their next clue.

== Gallery ==
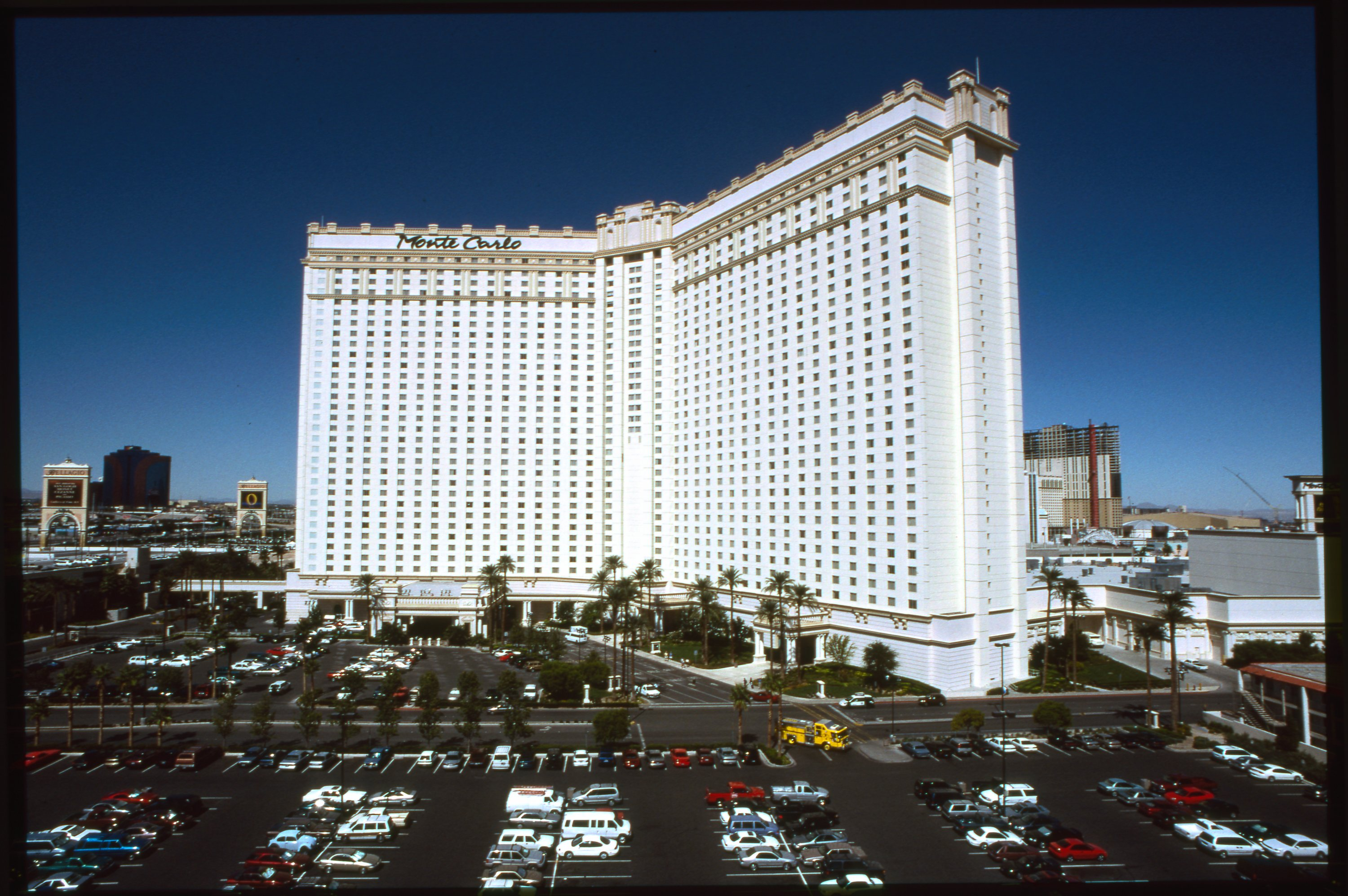
Monte Carlo hotel tower, 1999

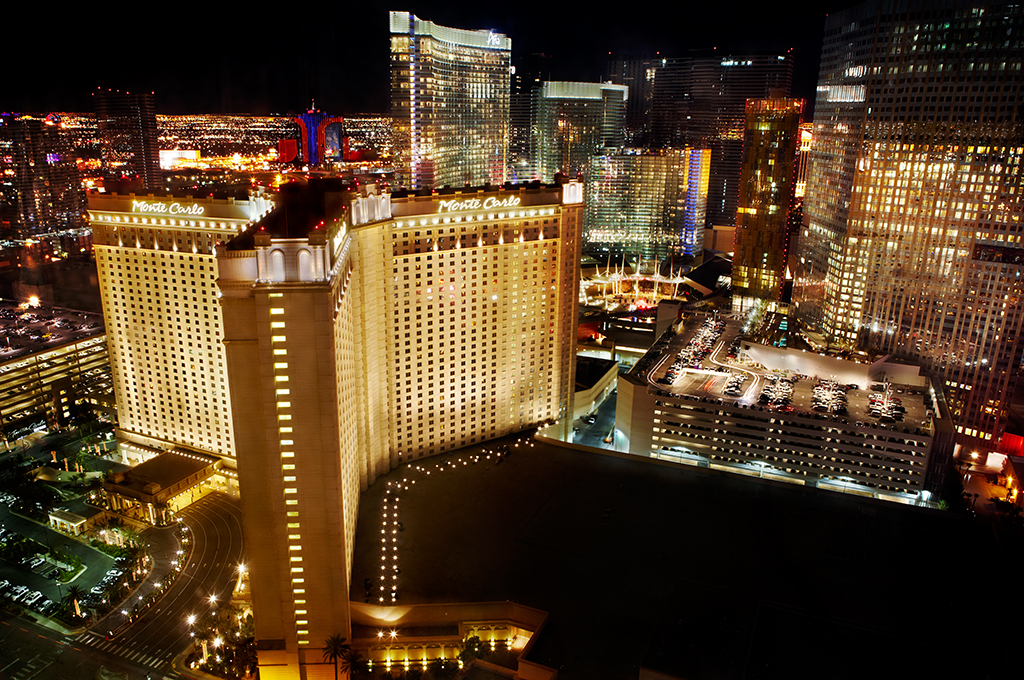
Aerial view of the Monte Carlo at night, 2009

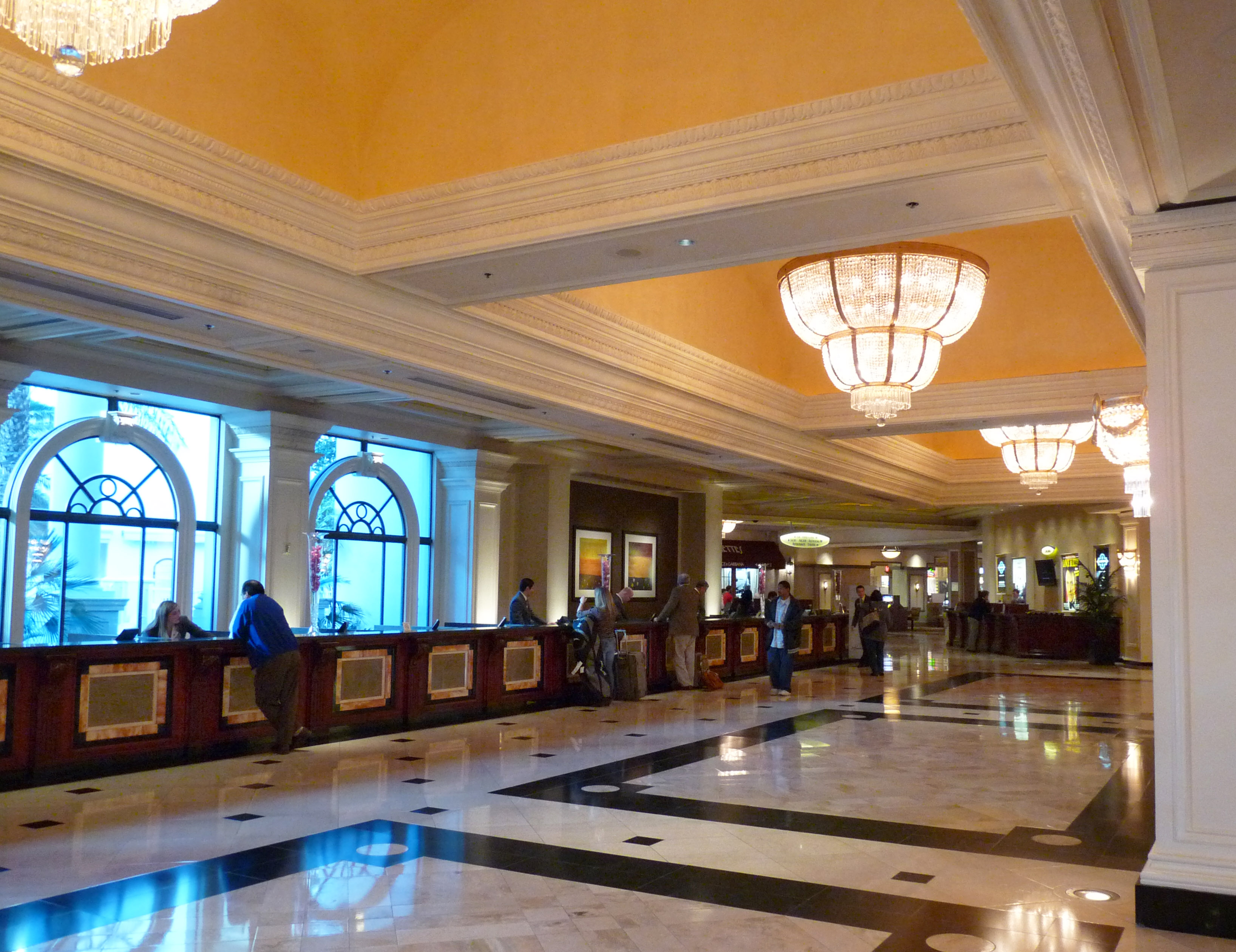
Monte Carlo hotel lobby, 2009

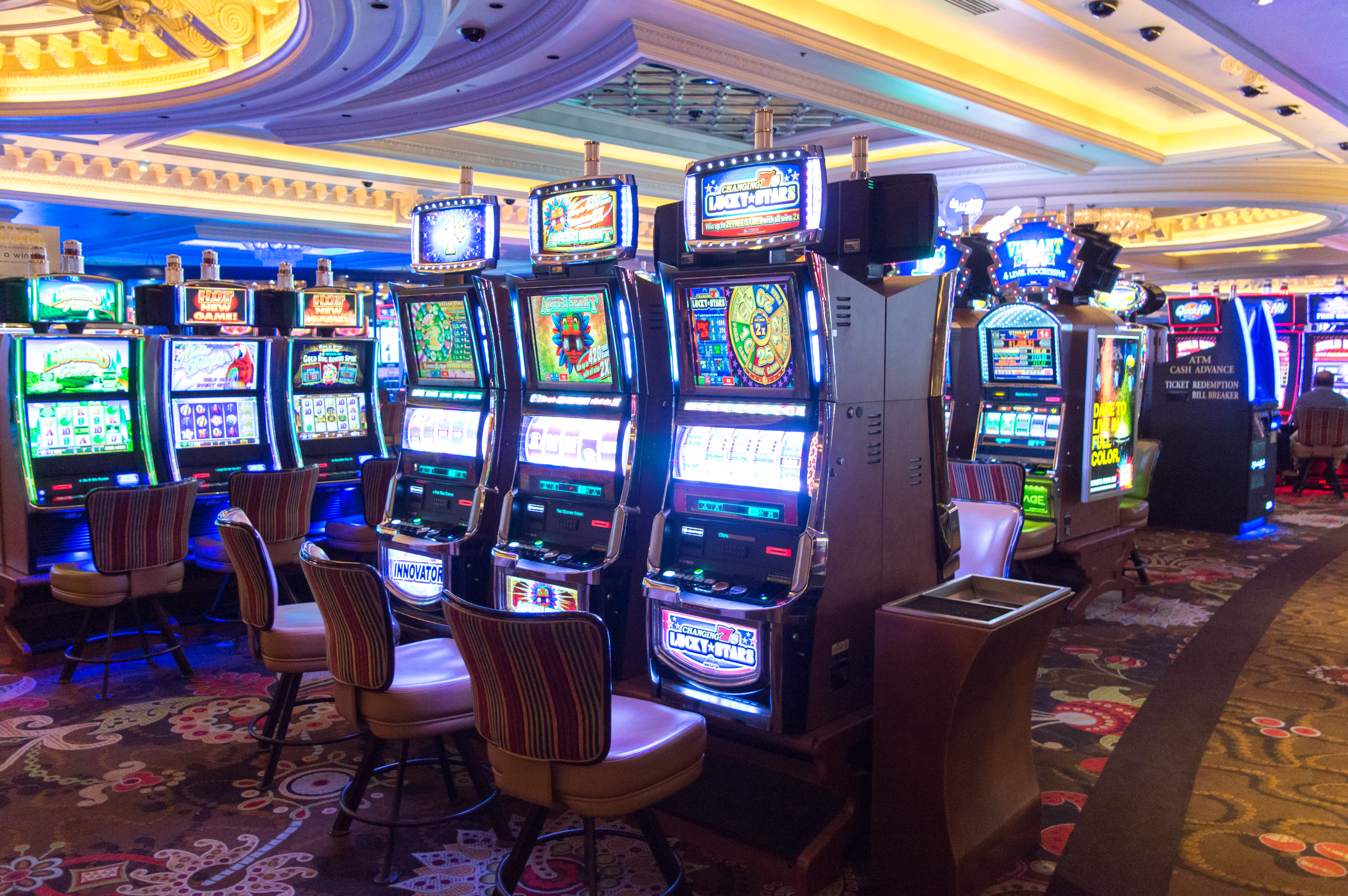
Monte Carlo casino floor, 2015

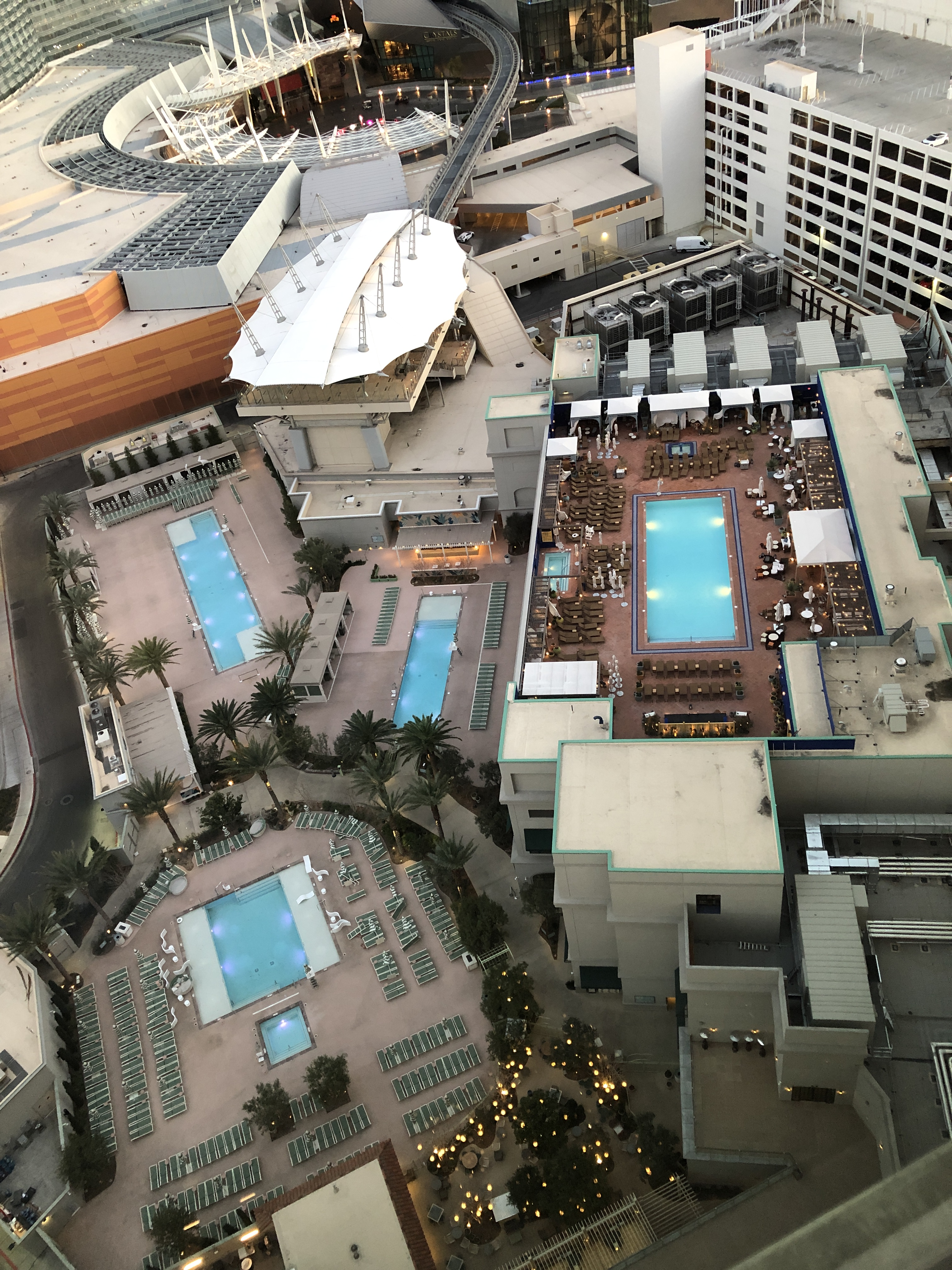
The resort's pool area, 2019

== See also ==
- List of integrated resorts
