= Criss Angel's Magic with the Stars =

American television magic show

- Genre: Stage magic
- Presented by: Eddie Griffin
- Judges: Criss Angel; Loni Love; Lance Burton
- Country of origin: United States
- Original language: English
- No. of seasons: 1
- No. of episodes: 10

Production
- Executive producers: Criss Angel; Dave Baram; Erich Recker
- Running time: 42 minutes
- Production company: Criss Angel Studios

Original release
- Network: The CW
- Release: October 22, 2022 – February 10, 2023

Criss Angel's Magic with the Stars is an American television magic competition show that premiered on October 22, 2022 on The CW. It was canceled after one season.

== Format ==
Each week two celebrities compete against each other after they are trained by Angel. There are three categories which are performed in front of a live audience and judged by Angel, Loni Love, and Lance Burton.

== Production ==
On May 19, 2022, it was announced that The CW had ordered the series. On December 9, 2021, Eddie Griffin was announced as host of the show, with Criss Angel, Loni Love, and Lance Burton serving as judges.

The series premiered on October 22, 2022. It was canceled by The CW after one season.

== Episodes ==
No.	Title	Original release date	Prod. code	U.S. viewers (millions)
1	"The Greatest Levitation of All Time"	October 22, 2022	101	0.37
Guests: Corbin Bleu and Miles Brown
2	"Amystika Chair"	October 29, 2022	102	0.32
Guests: Maksim Chmerkovskiy and Omarion
3	"Metamorphosis"	November 5, 2022	103	0.33
Guests: Lolo Jones and Frankie Muniz
4	"Submerged"	November 12, 2022	104	0.33
Guests: Ginuwine and Jeff Timmons
5	"100 Foot Rope Escape"	November 19, 2022	106	0.36
Guests: Vernon Davis and Flavor Flav
6	"Easy Rider"	December 2, 2022	108	0.47
Guests: Michael Ian Black and Matt Walsh
7	"Enigma"	January 20, 2023	110	0.43
Guests: Donny Osmond and Debbie Gibson
8	"Video Game to Life"	January 27, 2023	107	0.41
Guests: Randy Couture and Frank Mir
9	"Upside Down Straight Jacket"	February 3, 2023	109	0.36
Guests: Johnny Weir and Tara Lipinski
10	"In Two"	February 10, 2023	105	0.35
Guests: Cynthia Bailey and Brec Bassinger

== Ratings ==
Viewership and ratings per episode of Criss Angel's Magic with the Stars
No.	Title	Air date	Rating/share (18–49)	Viewers (millions)	DVR (18–49)	DVR viewers (millions)	Total (18–49)	Total viewers (millions)
1	"The Greatest Levitation of All Time"	October 22, 2022	0.1	0.37	0.3	0.03	0.1	0.40
2	"Amystika Chair"	October 29, 2022	0.0	0.32	0.0	0.04	0.0	0.36
3	"Metamorphosis"	November 5, 2022	0.1	0.33	0.0	0.05	0.1	0.38
4	"Submerged"	November 12, 2022	0.1	0.33	0.0	0.05	0.1	0.38
5	"100 Foot Rope Escape"	November 19, 2022	0.0	0.36	—N/a	—N/a	—N/a	—N/a
6	"Easy Rider"	December 2, 2022	0.0	0.47	—N/a	—N/a	—N/a	—N/a
7	"Enigma"	January 20, 2023	0.1	0.43	0.0	0.04	0.1	0.47
8	"Video Game to Life"	January 27, 2023	0.1	0.41	TBD	TBD	TBD	TBD
9	"Upside Down Straight Jacket"	February 3, 2023	0.1	0.36	TBD	TBD	TBD	TBD
10	"In Two"	February 10, 2023	0.1	0.35	TBD	TBD	TBD	TBD
