= Bricia Lopez =

Mexican-American author and restaurateur

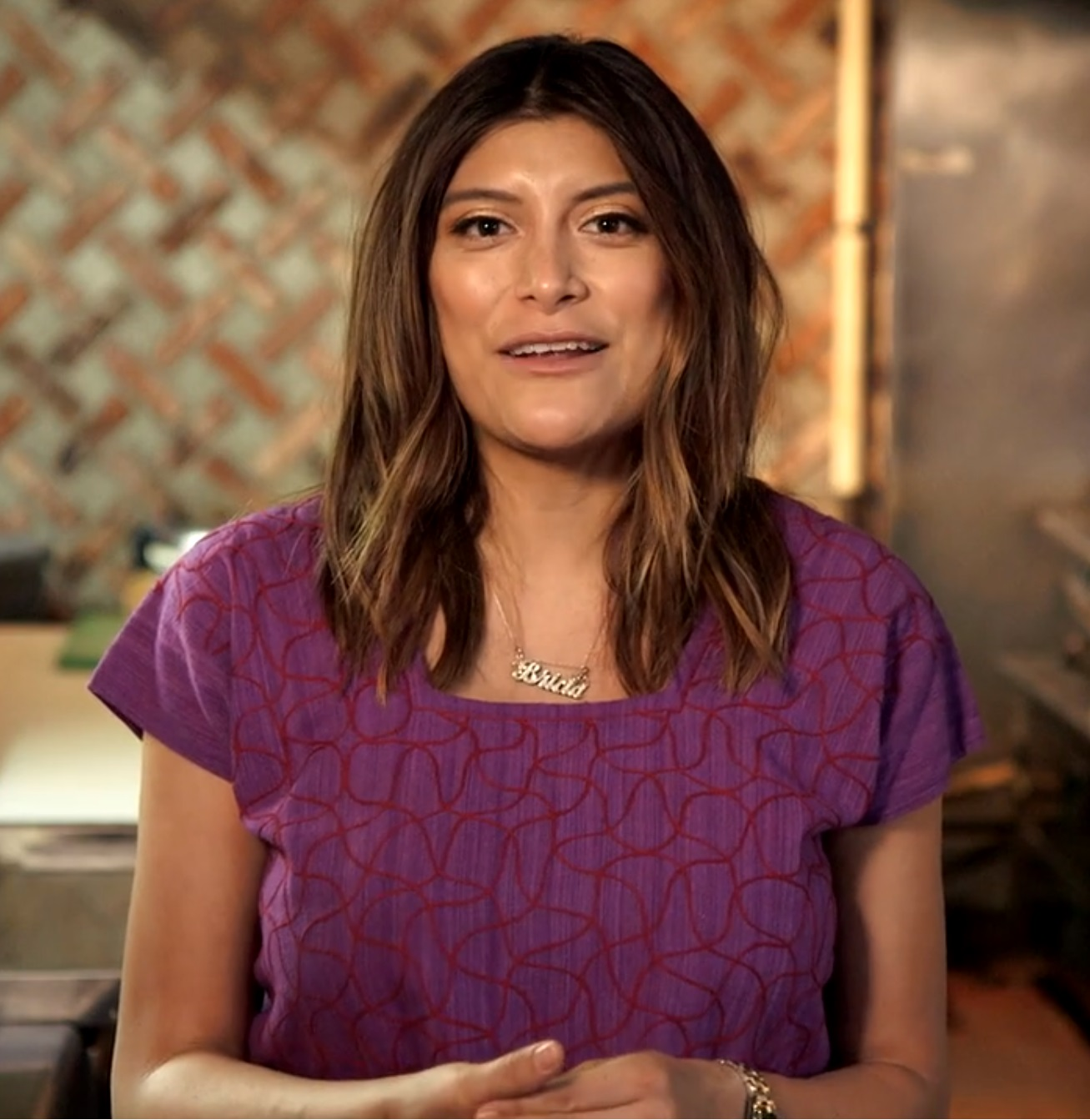
- Lopez interviewed in 2015
- Born: San Pablo Villa de Mitla, Mexico
- Occupations: Restauranteur, author
- Spouse: Eduardo Maytorena III
- Children: 2

Bricia Lopez is a Mexican-American restaurateur and author. Lopez is the co-owner of Guelaguetza, a Oaxacan restaurant in Los Angeles, California in the United States. Lopez is one of America's foremost authorities on Oaxacan culture and cuisine and is credited with helping to popularize mezcal in the United States. She also co-hosts the Super Mamás podcast with her sister, Paulina Lopez.

== Early life and education ==
Bricia Lopez was born in San Pablo Villa de Mitla in Mexico. Her father made mezcal and operated a mezcal store. As a child, Lopez worked in the store, selling mezcal. At the age of ten, she migrated, with her parents, to the United States. Her parents, Maria Monterrubio and Fernando Lopez, opened Guelaguetza, a Oaxacan restaurant in the Koreatown neighborhood of Los Angeles in 1994.

== Career ==
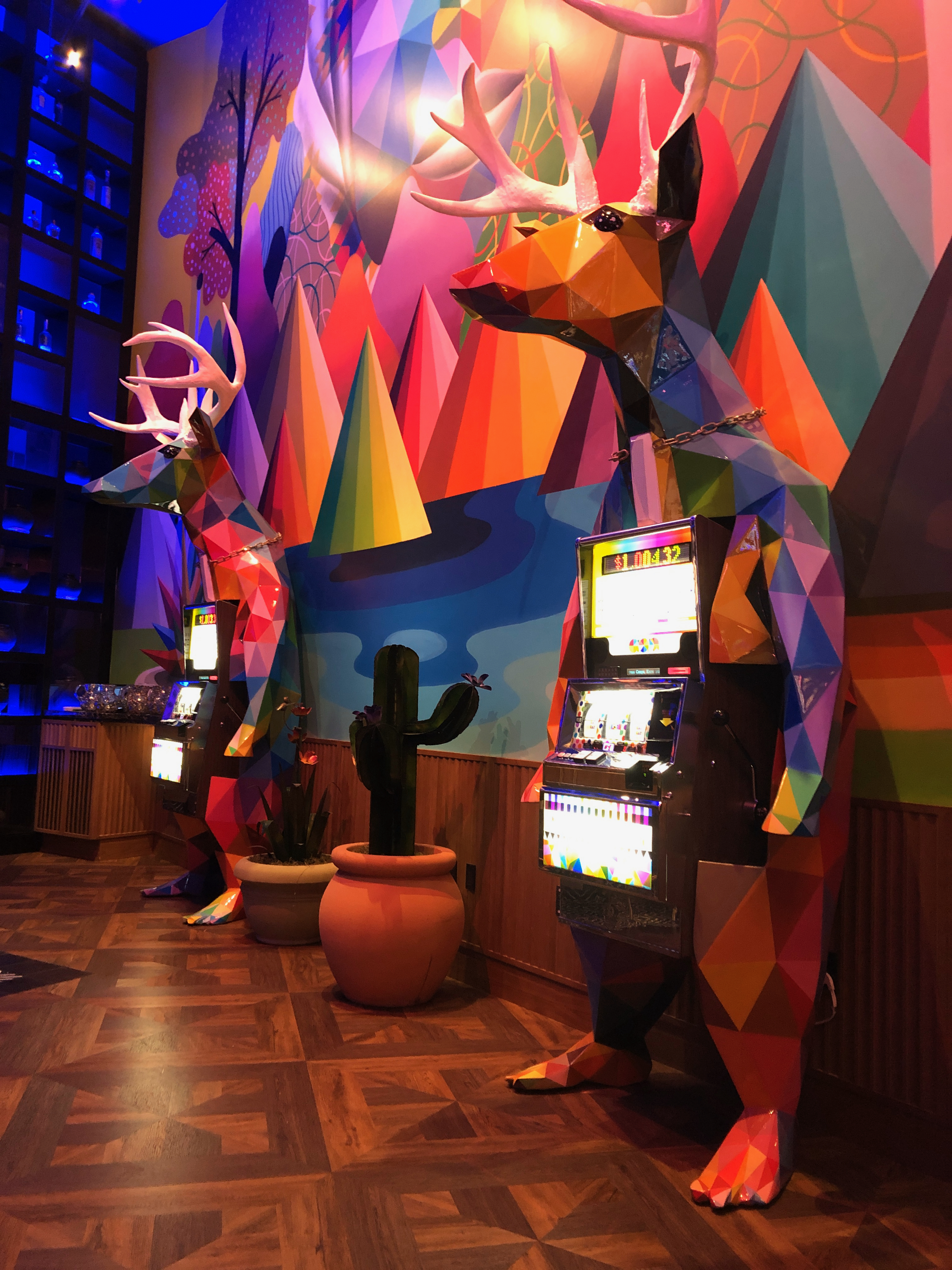
Oaxacan-themed mural and slot machines at Mama Rabbit.

Lopez and her sister, Paulina, and brother, Fernando, took over ownership of Guelaguetza after their parents retired. The late L.A. Times food critic Jonathan Gold called the restaurant "The best Oaxacan restaurant in the United States". In 2015, she co-created the podcast Super Mamás with her sister, Paulina. In 2019, Lopez opened Mama Rabbit at the Park MGM in Las Vegas, Nevada. It claims to have the largest tequila and mezcal selection in the United States, with over 500 offerings. That same year, the cookbook Oaxaca: Home Cooking from the Heart of Mexico, written by Lopez and Javier Cabral, was published. It is the first cookbook published to be written by an Oaxacan person. The book has been named one of the top cookbooks of 2019 by Mother Jones, the Los Angeles Times and The Washington Post.

== Personal life ==
Lopez is divorced and divides her time between Los Angeles and Oaxaca, where she lives with her two children.
