= Lance Burton =

American stage magician (born 1960)

- Born: William Lance Burton; March 10, 1960 (age 66); Columbia, Kentucky, U.S.
- Occupation: Magician
- Years active: 1977–2010
- Height: 6 ft 0 in (1.83 m)
- Spouse: Melinda Saxe (m. 1993; div. 1994)

William Lance Burton (born March 10, 1960) is an American stage magician. He performed more than 15,000 shows in Las Vegas for over 5,000,000 people until retiring in 2010. He serves as a judge on Criss Angel's Magic with the Stars.

== Professional history ==
Burton first became interested in magic at the age of 5, when he was one of the volunteers at a magic show of Magician Harry Collins. The trick was the Miser's Dream, where Collins "pulled silver dollars out of the sky" and Burton's ears. The young Burton was fascinated, and a neighbor, hearing of his interest, gave him a book, Magic Made Easy, which her own (then-grown) children had used. It contained ten tricks, all of which young Burton quickly learned. His first performances were for neighborhood children, charging them a nickel each.

Collins, a full-time magician, noticed the interest, and became his mentor when Burton was in his teens, teaching him the fundamentals of the trade. Another of Burton's influences was his mentor Channing Pollock, who influenced Burton's card manipulation and use of doves. In 1977, as a teenager, Burton entered his first magic competition and won first prize. In 1980, shortly after his 20th birthday, he was awarded a "Gold Medal of Excellence" from the International Brotherhood of Magicians. Soon after, Burton moved to Southern California, where within a week he appeared on The Tonight Show (on October 28, 1981). Through the course of Burton's career he was invited back for a total of ten performances while Johnny Carson was host, and another ten performances during Jay Leno's tenure. Burton has also appeared on The Late Late Show with Craig Ferguson.

He performed an initial eight-week trial at the Folies Bergère show in Las Vegas, and then had his contract extended for a record-breaking nine years. In 1982, he competed at the international Fédération Internationale des Sociétés Magiques (FISM) competition in Lausanne, Switzerland, and won the "Grand Prix" prize (the main event of the FISM competition). He was, up to that point, the youngest to win the Grand Prix, and the first American to do so.

In 1991, he produced, directed, and wrote his own show, which opened at the Hacienda Hotel and ran for five years. He had a brief marriage to magician Melinda Saxe in August 1993, but they divorced shortly after. In August 1994, Burton signed a 13-year contract (the longest contract given, at that point, to any entertainer in Las Vegas history) with the Monte Carlo Resort in Las Vegas. The 1,274-seat Lance Burton Theater was built to Burton's specifications for his show, cost $27 million, and opened on June 21, 1996. Entertainment Today magazine listed it as the #1 family magic act, and during its 13-year run Burton earned an estimated $110 million.

In 2004, Burton celebrated his tenth anniversary at the Monte Carlo by introducing an illusion entitled "Solid Gold Lady", for which he used $10 million in gold. In 2006, he appeared on the Labor Day Weekend Jerry Lewis MDA Telethon. On July 1, 2009, Burton signed a six-year contract extension with the Monte Carlo Resort and Casino, which would continue his contract until 2015. However, the contract was ended five years earlier than planned, and the final show was performed on September 4, 2010.

In 2020, Lance Burton performed in Blackpool, England.

=== Television appearances ===
In 1986, Burton guest starred in a fourth season episode Knight Rider titled "Deadly Knightshade" as the mastermind magician behind the murder of a Foundation trustee. In 1986, he appeared in Nickelodeon's Halloween special Mystery Magical Special.

Burton starred in several network television specials, including

- The Legend Begins (1996)
- The Encounter (1997)
- Top Secret (1998)
- On The Road (2001)

For his Top Secret special that first aired on February 24, 1999, at Buffalo Bill's Hotel & Casino in Primm, Nevada, Burton staged an illusion in which he appeared to escape the path of a speeding roller coaster while on the tracks of "The Desperado". The Desperado is one of the tallest and fastest roller coasters in the United States – taking one minute to climb, and 3.5 seconds to descend to where he was on the tracks. He appeared to avoid the coaster by a mere tenth of a second, the trick having apparently gone wrong. After the "narrow escape", he looked at the camera and said "That was stupid...That was really stupid."

Burton appeared on an episode of the History channel series American Restoration, televised November 1, 2010, in which the Rick's Restorations crew repaired a light pole at Burton's residence that had been destroyed in a windstorm.

In 2022, Lance Burton was a guest judge on Criss Angel's Magic with the Stars on The CW.

== Awards ==
- The Academy of Magical Arts has twice awarded him "Magician of the Year" (1985, 1991), and also given him a Masters Fellowship (2010)."Hall of Fame". The Academy of Magical Arts. July 2, 2014.
- 1982 Grand Prix Award at FISM for a performance in which he stood in a street scene in traditional top hat and tails and produced doves, candles and gentleman's walking canes.
- 1997 Blackstone Theatre Award.
- 2016 David Devant Award from The Magic Circle, given "to those who have made a significant contribution in advancing the art of magic."
