= Lance Burton Theatre =

Former theater in Paradise, Nevada, US

- Interactive map of Lance Burton Theatre
- Address: 3770 South Las Vegas Boulevard; Las Vegas, Nevada 89109-8924
- Location: Monte Carlo, Las Vegas Strip, Paradise
- Coordinates: 36°06′14″N 115°10′30″W
- Owner: MGM Resorts International
- Operator: MGM Resorts International
- Capacity: 1,274

Construction
- Groundbreaking: 1994
- Opened: June 21, 1996
- Renovated: 2013
- Closed: July 2015
- Cost: $108 million
- Architects: Scéno Plus and GSB, Inc.
- Structural engineer: Kordt Engineering Group
- Services engineer: Global Structural Detailing
- General contractor: Perini Corporation
- Main contractor: Morris-Shea Bridge Company

The Lance Burton Theatre was located in the Monte Carlo Resort and Casino. Its 1,274 seats were arranged in three main sections: the main floor, the mezzanine, and the balcony. The theatre was specially built for Lance Burton's magic show and until 2010 hosted Lance Burton: Master Magician.

On October 22, 2001, the theater was the host site for the release of the USPS Harry Houdini stamp.

== Entertainment ==
In addition to Lance Burton's magic show five days a week, the theater hosted a weekly Vintage Vegas Show with Chris Phillips, Marley Taylor, and Frank Caliendo for 4 shows a week.
