= Classic Cher =

Concert residency by Cher from 2017 to 2020

- Residency by Cher
- Promotional poster for the residency
- Location: Las Vegas, Nevada; Oxon Hill, Maryland; Atlantic City, New Jersey
- Venue: Park Theater; The Theater at MGM National Harbor; Borgata Event Center
- Start date: February 8, 2017
- End date: February 21, 2020
- Legs: 14
- No. of shows: 104
- Attendance: 348,247
- Box office: US$52,881,124

Cher concert chronology
- Dressed to Kill Tour (2014); Classic Cher (2017–20); Here We Go Again Tour (2018–20)

Classic Cher was a concert residency by American singer Cher, presented at the Park Theater in Las Vegas, Nevada, The Theater at MGM National Harbor in Oxon Hill, Maryland, and the Borgata Event Center in Atlantic City, New Jersey. The residency began on February 8, 2017, and concluded on February 21, 2020, after 104 performances. It was Cher's third concert residency and featured a career-spanning selection of her songs, along with elaborate costumes, multimedia elements, and theatrical staging.

The show opened at the newly constructed Park Theater and featured songs from throughout Cher's career, along with costumes designed by Bob Mackie, video projections, aerialists, lasers, and other theatrical effects. The set list changed during the residency, with several ABBA songs added in 2018 as Cher incorporated material from her album Dancing Queen into the show.

The residency ran for 104 performances, with box-office reports documenting more than $51 million in gross revenue by February 2020.

== Set list ==
This set list is representative for the opening concert on February 8, 2017.

1. "Woman's World"
2. "Strong Enough"
3. "Gayatri Mantra"
4. "All or Nothing"
5. "The Beat Goes On"
6. "All I Really Want to Do"
7. "I Got You Babe"
8. "Gypsys, Tramps & Thieves"
9. "Dark Lady"
10. "Half-Breed"
11. "Welcome to Burlesque"
12. "Take Me Home"
13. "After All"
14. "Walking in Memphis"
15. "The Shoop Shoop Song (It's in His Kiss)"
16. "I Found Someone"
17. "If I Could Turn Back Time"

Encore

18. "Believe"
Notes
- "All I Really Want to Do" was removed after the show on August 4, 2018
- On October 31, 2018, "Take Me Home" and "The Shoop Shoop Song (It's in His Kiss)" were removed from the set list, and the ABBA covers of "Waterloo", "SOS" (Removed during leg 13, and then added back for leg 14) and "Fernando" were added.
- Starting with the show on November 2, 2018, "The Shoop Shoop Song (It's in His Kiss)" got added back and "Gypsys, Tramps & Thieves", "Dark Lady" and "Half-Breed" were removed from the set list.

== Shows ==
List of concerts, showing date, city, country, venue, tickets sold, number of available tickets and amount of gross revenue
Date	City	Venue	Attendance	Revenue
Leg 1
February 8, 2017	Las Vegas	Park Theater	28,648 / 35,763 (80%)	$3,889,480
February 10, 2017	Las Vegas	Park Theater	28,648 / 35,763 (80%)	$3,889,480
February 11, 2017	Las Vegas	Park Theater	28,648 / 35,763 (80%)	$3,889,480
February 14, 2017	Las Vegas	Park Theater	28,648 / 35,763 (80%)	$3,889,480
February 22, 2017	Las Vegas	Park Theater	28,648 / 35,763 (80%)	$3,889,480
February 24, 2017	Las Vegas	Park Theater	28,648 / 35,763 (80%)	$3,889,480
February 25, 2017	Las Vegas	Park Theater	28,648 / 35,763 (80%)	$3,889,480
Leg 2
March 17, 2017	Oxon Hill	The Theater at MGM National Harbor	15,826 / 16,557 (96%)	$2,885,444
March 19, 2017	Oxon Hill	The Theater at MGM National Harbor	15,826 / 16,557 (96%)	$2,885,444
March 20, 2017	Oxon Hill	The Theater at MGM National Harbor	15,826 / 16,557 (96%)	$2,885,444
March 23, 2017	Oxon Hill	The Theater at MGM National Harbor	15,826 / 16,557 (96%)	$2,885,444
March 25, 2017	Oxon Hill	The Theater at MGM National Harbor	15,826 / 16,557 (96%)	$2,885,444
March 26, 2017	Oxon Hill	The Theater at MGM National Harbor	15,826 / 16,557 (96%)	$2,885,444
Leg 3
May 3, 2017	Las Vegas	Park Theater	37,734 / 41,576 (91%)	$5,556,950
May 5, 2017	Las Vegas	Park Theater	37,734 / 41,576 (91%)	$5,556,950
May 6, 2017	Las Vegas	Park Theater	37,734 / 41,576 (91%)	$5,556,950
May 10, 2017	Las Vegas	Park Theater	37,734 / 41,576 (91%)	$5,556,950
May 12, 2017	Las Vegas	Park Theater	37,734 / 41,576 (91%)	$5,556,950
May 13, 2017	Las Vegas	Park Theater	37,734 / 41,576 (91%)	$5,556,950
May 17, 2017	Las Vegas	Park Theater	37,734 / 41,576 (91%)	$5,556,950
May 19, 2017	Las Vegas	Park Theater	37,734 / 41,576 (91%)	$5,556,950
May 20, 2017	Las Vegas	Park Theater	37,734 / 41,576 (91%)	$5,556,950
Leg 4
August 2, 2017	Las Vegas	Park Theater	30,768 / 37,800 (81%)	$4,189,699
August 4, 2017	Las Vegas	Park Theater	30,768 / 37,800 (81%)	$4,189,699
August 5, 2017	Las Vegas	Park Theater	30,768 / 37,800 (81%)	$4,189,699
August 9, 2017	Las Vegas	Park Theater	30,768 / 37,800 (81%)	$4,189,699
August 11, 2017	Las Vegas	Park Theater	30,768 / 37,800 (81%)	$4,189,699
August 12, 2017	Las Vegas	Park Theater	30,768 / 37,800 (81%)	$4,189,699
August 16, 2017	Las Vegas	Park Theater	30,768 / 37,800 (81%)	$4,189,699
August 18, 2017	Las Vegas	Park Theater	30,768 / 37,800 (81%)	$4,189,699
August 19, 2017	Las Vegas	Park Theater	30,768 / 37,800 (81%)	$4,189,699
Leg 5
August 31, 2017	Oxon Hill	The Theater at MGM National Harbor	14,560 / 15,622 (93%)	$2,752,025
September 2, 2017	Oxon Hill	The Theater at MGM National Harbor	14,560 / 15,622 (93%)	$2,752,025
September 3, 2017	Oxon Hill	The Theater at MGM National Harbor	14,560 / 15,622 (93%)	$2,752,025
September 7, 2017	Oxon Hill	The Theater at MGM National Harbor	14,560 / 15,622 (93%)	$2,752,025
September 9, 2017	Oxon Hill	The Theater at MGM National Harbor	14,560 / 15,622 (93%)	$2,752,025
September 10, 2017	Oxon Hill	The Theater at MGM National Harbor	14,560 / 15,622 (93%)	$2,752,025
Leg 6
November 8, 2017	Las Vegas	Park Theater	30,995 / 35,362 (88%)	$4,871,555
November 10, 2017	Las Vegas	Park Theater	30,995 / 35,362 (88%)	$4,871,555
November 11, 2017	Las Vegas	Park Theater	30,995 / 35,362 (88%)	$4,871,555
November 15, 2017	Las Vegas	Park Theater	30,995 / 35,362 (88%)	$4,871,555
November 17, 2017	Las Vegas	Park Theater	30,995 / 35,362 (88%)	$4,871,555
November 18, 2017	Las Vegas	Park Theater	30,995 / 35,362 (88%)	$4,871,555
November 21, 2017	Las Vegas	Park Theater	30,995 / 35,362 (88%)	$4,871,555
November 24, 2017	Las Vegas	Park Theater	30,995 / 35,362 (88%)	$4,871,555
November 25, 2017	Las Vegas	Park Theater	30,995 / 35,362 (88%)	$4,871,555
Leg 7
January 17, 2018	Las Vegas	Park Theater	20,165 / 21,305 (95%)	$3,355,191
January 19, 2018	Las Vegas	Park Theater	20,165 / 21,305 (95%)	$3,355,191
January 20, 2018	Las Vegas	Park Theater	20,165 / 21,305 (95%)	$3,355,191
January 24, 2018	Las Vegas	Park Theater	20,165 / 21,305 (95%)	$3,355,191
January 26, 2018	Las Vegas	Park Theater	20,165 / 21,305 (95%)	$3,355,191
January 27, 2018	Las Vegas	Park Theater	20,165 / 21,305 (95%)	$3,355,191
January 31, 2018	Las Vegas	Park Theater	20,165 / 21,305 (95%)	$3,355,191
February 2, 2018	Las Vegas	Park Theater	20,165 / 21,305 (95%)	$3,355,191
February 3, 2018	Las Vegas	Park Theater	20,165 / 21,305 (95%)	$3,355,191
Leg 8
February 17, 2018	Oxon Hill	The Theater at MGM National Harbor	11,502 / 14,499 (79%)	$1,816,519
February 18, 2018	Oxon Hill	The Theater at MGM National Harbor	11,502 / 14,499 (79%)	$1,816,519
February 20, 2018	Oxon Hill	The Theater at MGM National Harbor	11,502 / 14,499 (79%)	$1,816,519
February 22, 2018	Oxon Hill	The Theater at MGM National Harbor	11,502 / 14,499 (79%)	$1,816,519
February 24, 2018	Oxon Hill	The Theater at MGM National Harbor	11,502 / 14,499 (79%)	$1,816,519
February 25, 2018	Oxon Hill	The Theater at MGM National Harbor	11,502 / 14,499 (79%)	$1,816,519
Leg 9
May 2, 2018	Las Vegas	Park Theater	25,435 / 27,691 (92%)	$4,219,171
May 4, 2018	Las Vegas	Park Theater	25,435 / 27,691 (92%)	$4,219,171
May 5, 2018	Las Vegas	Park Theater	25,435 / 27,691 (92%)	$4,219,171
May 9, 2018	Las Vegas	Park Theater	25,435 / 27,691 (92%)	$4,219,171
May 12, 2018	Las Vegas	Park Theater	25,435 / 27,691 (92%)	$4,219,171
May 13, 2018	Las Vegas	Park Theater	25,435 / 27,691 (92%)	$4,219,171
May 16, 2018	Las Vegas	Park Theater	25,435 / 27,691 (92%)	$4,219,171
May 18, 2018	Las Vegas	Park Theater	25,435 / 27,691 (92%)	$4,219,171
May 19, 2018	Las Vegas	Park Theater	25,435 / 27,691 (92%)	$4,219,171
Leg 10
August 4, 2018	Oxon Hill	The Theater at MGM National Harbor	13,604 / 15,329 (89%)	$1,800,067
August 5, 2018	Oxon Hill	The Theater at MGM National Harbor	13,604 / 15,329 (89%)	$1,800,067
August 7, 2018	Oxon Hill	The Theater at MGM National Harbor	13,604 / 15,329 (89%)	$1,800,067
August 9, 2018	Oxon Hill	The Theater at MGM National Harbor	13,604 / 15,329 (89%)	$1,800,067
August 11, 2018	Oxon Hill	The Theater at MGM National Harbor	13,604 / 15,329 (89%)	$1,800,067
August 12, 2018	Oxon Hill	The Theater at MGM National Harbor	13,604 / 15,329 (89%)	$1,800,067
August 17, 2018	Atlantic City	Borgata Event Center	3,809 / 3,886 (98%)	$734,570
August 18, 2018	Atlantic City	Borgata Event Center	3,809 / 3,886 (98%)	$734,570
Leg 11
October 31, 2018	Las Vegas	Park Theater	39,862 / 45,270 (88%)	$5,865,438
November 2, 2018	Las Vegas	Park Theater	39,862 / 45,270 (88%)	$5,865,438
November 3, 2018	Las Vegas	Park Theater	39,862 / 45,270 (88%)	$5,865,438
November 7, 2018	Las Vegas	Park Theater	39,862 / 45,270 (88%)	$5,865,438
November 9, 2018	Las Vegas	Park Theater	39,862 / 45,270 (88%)	$5,865,438
November 10, 2018	Las Vegas	Park Theater	39,862 / 45,270 (88%)	$5,865,438
November 14, 2018	Las Vegas	Park Theater	39,862 / 45,270 (88%)	$5,865,438
November 16, 2018	Las Vegas	Park Theater	39,862 / 45,270 (88%)	$5,865,438
November 17, 2018	Las Vegas	Park Theater	39,862 / 45,270 (88%)	$5,865,438
Leg 12
March 13, 2019	Las Vegas	Park Theater	40,362 / 45,910 (88%)	$5,811,810
March 15, 2019	Las Vegas	Park Theater	40,362 / 45,910 (88%)	$5,811,810
March 16, 2019	Las Vegas	Park Theater	40,362 / 45,910 (88%)	$5,811,810
March 20, 2019	Las Vegas	Park Theater	40,362 / 45,910 (88%)	$5,811,810
March 22, 2019	Las Vegas	Park Theater	40,362 / 45,910 (88%)	$5,811,810
March 23, 2019	Las Vegas	Park Theater	40,362 / 45,910 (88%)	$5,811,810
March 27, 2019	Las Vegas	Park Theater	40,362 / 45,910 (88%)	$5,811,810
March 29, 2019	Las Vegas	Park Theater	40,362 / 45,910 (88%)	$5,811,810
March 30, 2019	Las Vegas	Park Theater	40,362 / 45,910 (88%)	$5,811,810
Leg 13
August 21, 2019	Las Vegas	Park Theater	26,724 / 30,873 (87%)	$3,815,699
August 23, 2019	Las Vegas	Park Theater	26,724 / 30,873 (87%)	$3,815,699
August 24, 2019	Las Vegas	Park Theater	26,724 / 30,873 (87%)	$3,815,699
August 28, 2019	Las Vegas	Park Theater	26,724 / 30,873 (87%)	$3,815,699
August 31, 2019	Las Vegas	Park Theater	26,724 / 30,873 (87%)	$3,815,699
September 1, 2019	Las Vegas	Park Theater	26,724 / 30,873 (87%)	$3,815,699
Leg 14
February 19, 2020	Las Vegas	Park Theater	8,253 / 10,358 (80%)	$1,317,506
February 21, 2020	Las Vegas	Park Theater	8,253 / 10,358 (80%)	$1,317,506

== Cancelled and postponed shows ==
Date	City	Venue	Reason/Additional Info
February 18, 2017	Las Vegas	Park Theater	Flu
February 19, 2017	Las Vegas	Park Theater	Flu
February 22, 2020	Las Vegas	Park Theater	Illness
February 26, 2020	Las Vegas	Park Theater	Illness
February 28, 2020	Las Vegas	Park Theater	Illness
February 29, 2020	Las Vegas	Park Theater	Illness
July 15, 2020	Las Vegas	Park Theater	COVID-19 pandemic
July 17, 2020	Las Vegas	Park Theater	COVID-19 pandemic
July 18, 2020	Las Vegas	Park Theater	COVID-19 pandemic
July 29, 2020	Las Vegas	Park Theater	COVID-19 pandemic
July 31, 2020	Las Vegas	Park Theater	COVID-19 pandemic
August 1, 2020	Las Vegas	Park Theater	COVID-19 pandemic
August 5, 2020	Las Vegas	Park Theater	COVID-19 pandemic
August 7, 2020	Las Vegas	Park Theater	COVID-19 pandemic
August 8, 2020	Las Vegas	Park Theater	COVID-19 pandemic
October 21, 2020	Las Vegas	Park Theater	COVID-19 pandemic
October 23, 2020	Las Vegas	Park Theater	COVID-19 pandemic
October 24, 2020	Las Vegas	Park Theater	COVID-19 pandemic
October 28, 2020	Las Vegas	Park Theater	COVID-19 pandemic
October 30, 2020	Las Vegas	Park Theater	COVID-19 pandemic
October 31, 2020	Las Vegas	Park Theater	COVID-19 pandemic
November 4, 2020	Las Vegas	Park Theater	COVID-19 pandemic
November 6, 2020	Las Vegas	Park Theater	COVID-19 pandemic
November 7, 2020	Las Vegas	Park Theater	COVID-19 pandemic

== Personnel ==
- Lead Vocals: Cher
- Tour Director: Nick Cua
- Musical Director: Ollie Marland
- Costume Design: Bob Mackie

=== Band ===
- Keyboards: Ollie Marland and Darrell Smith
- Guitars: Joel Hoekstra / David Barry
- Bass: Ashley Reeves
- Drums: Jason Sutter
- Background vocals: Nikki Tillman
- Background vocals: Jodi Katz

=== Dancers ===
- Dancer: Marlon Pelayo
- Dancer: Daniel Dory
- Dancer: Melanie Lewis-Yribar
- Dancer: Jamal Story
- Dancer: Ben Bigler
- Dancer: Britta Grant
- Dancer: Bailey Swift
- Dancer: Sumayah McRae
- Dancer: SheilaJoy Burford
- Dancer: Dujuan Smart Jr
- Dancer: Ferly Prado
