= Las Vegas Strip =

Stretch of Las Vegas Boulevard with many resorts, shows, and casinos

- The Strip; Las Vegas Boulevard South
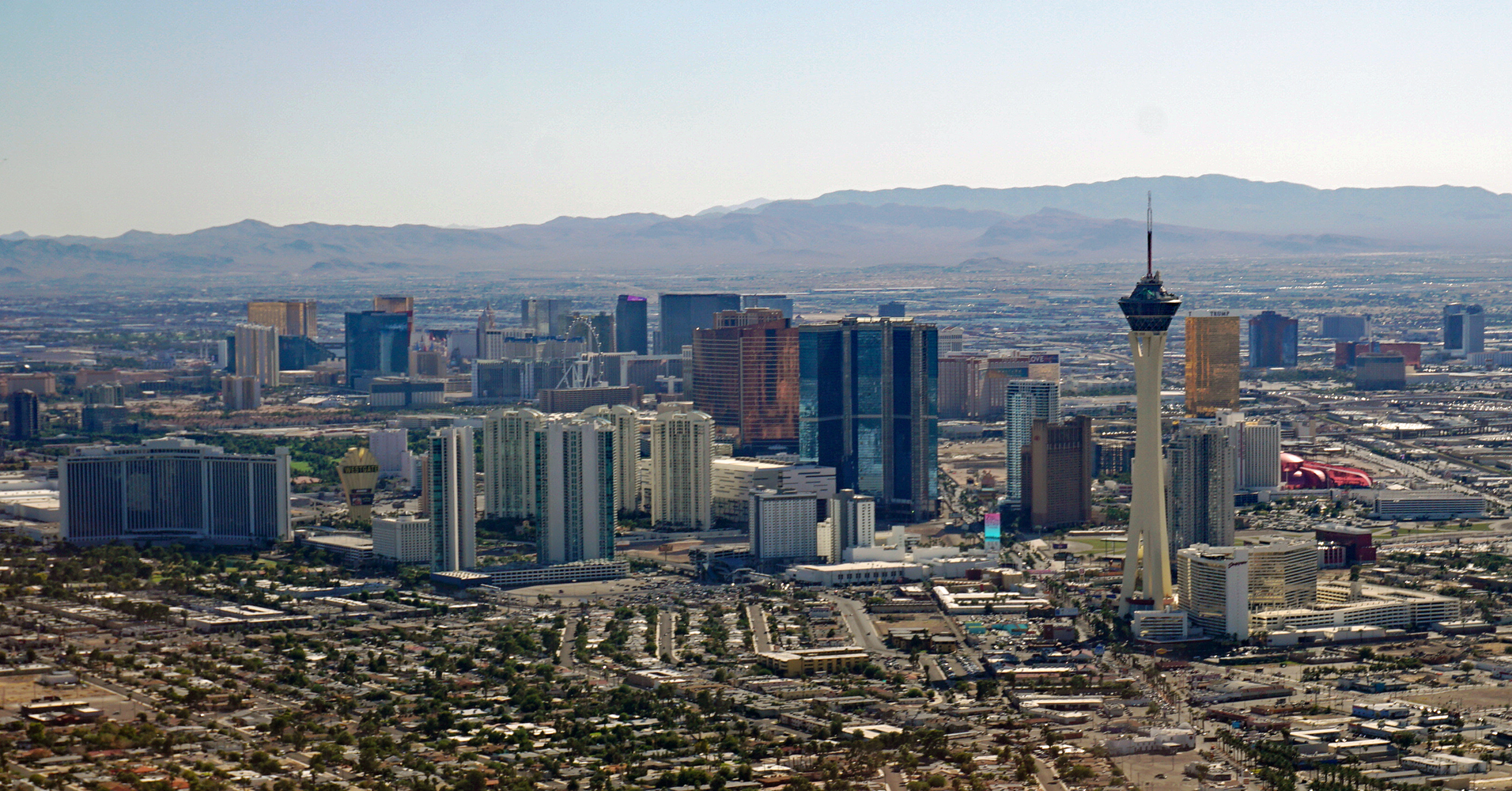
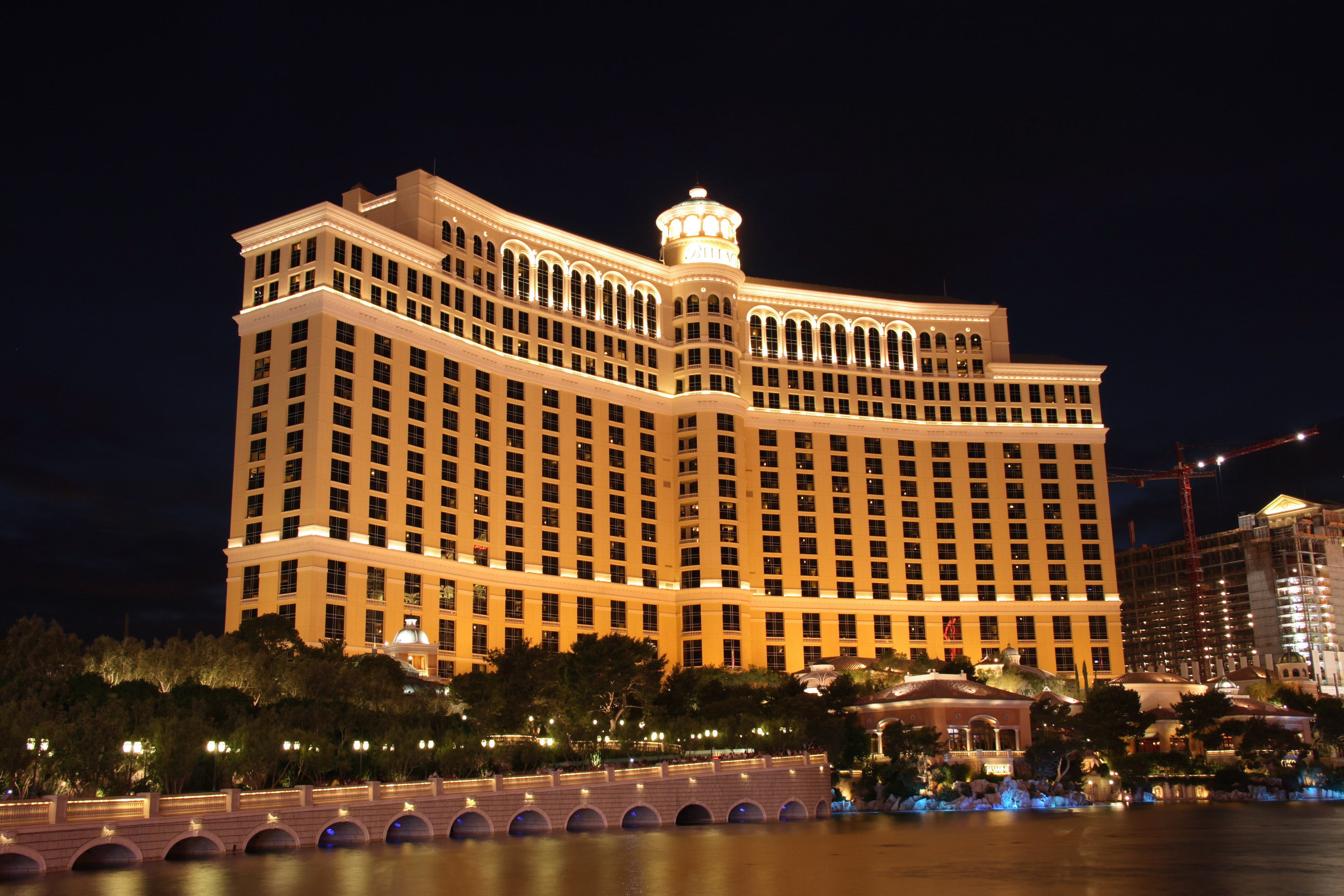
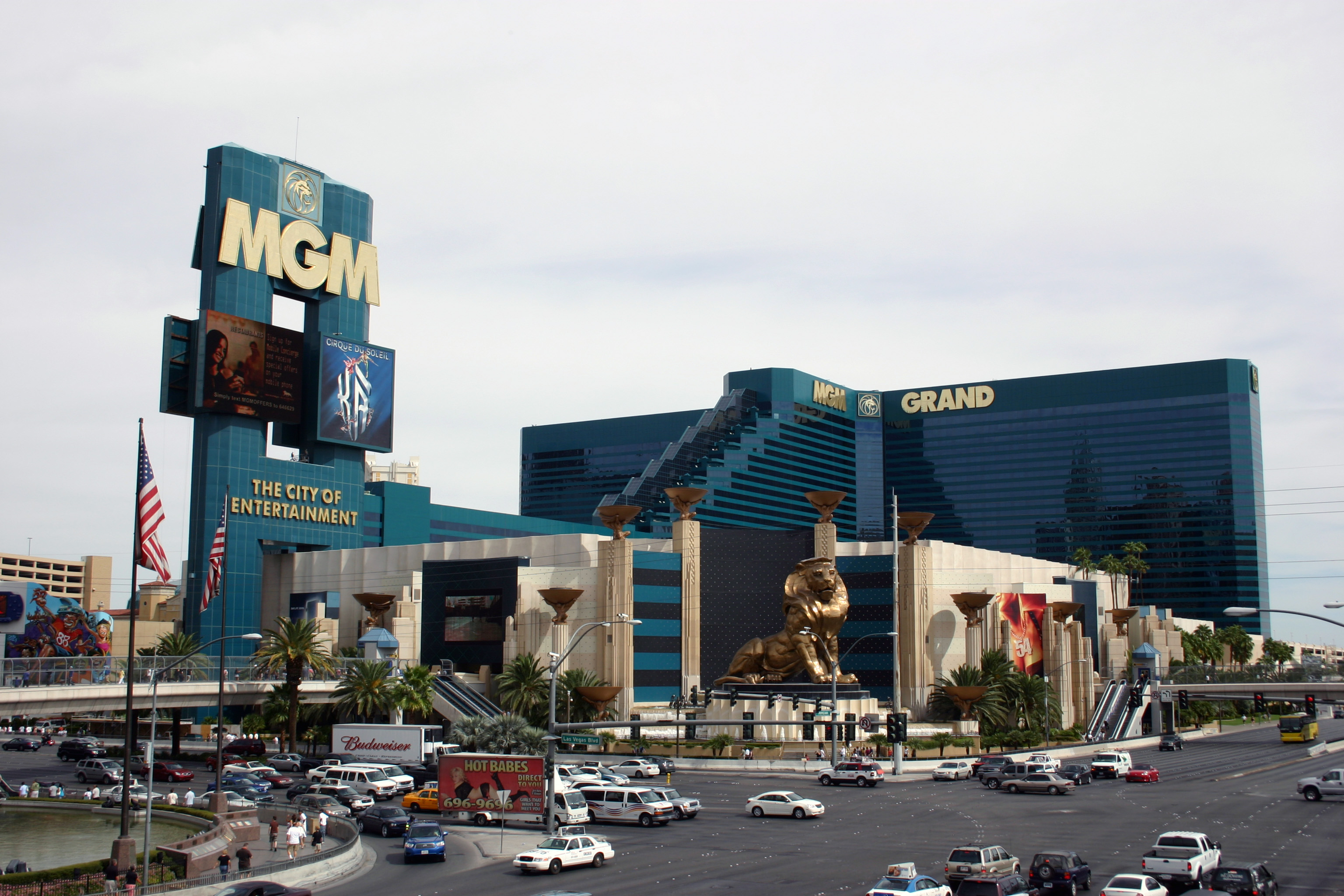
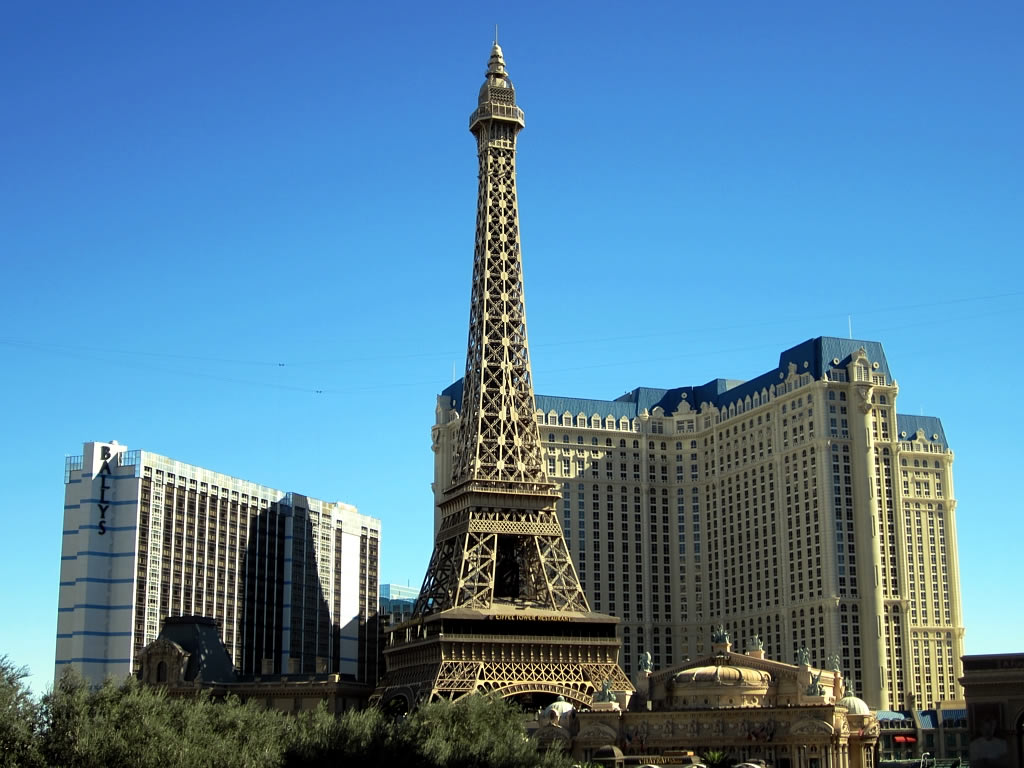
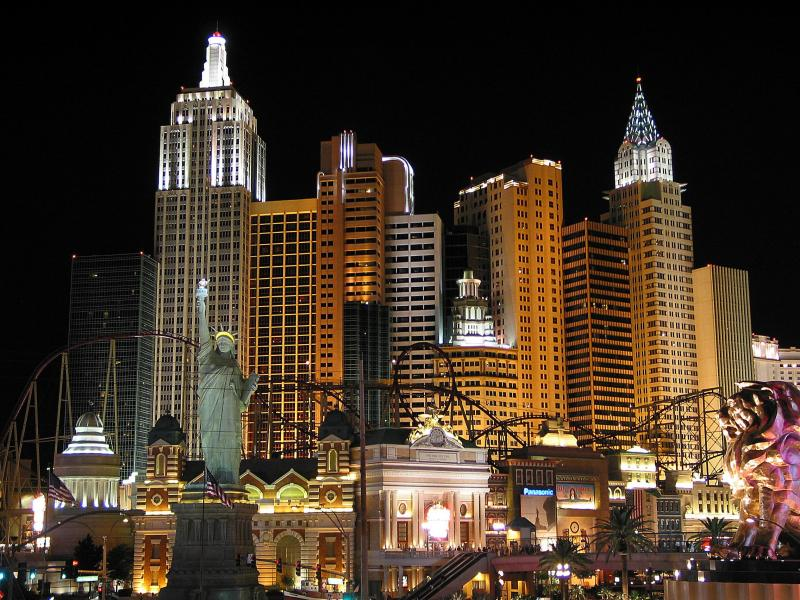
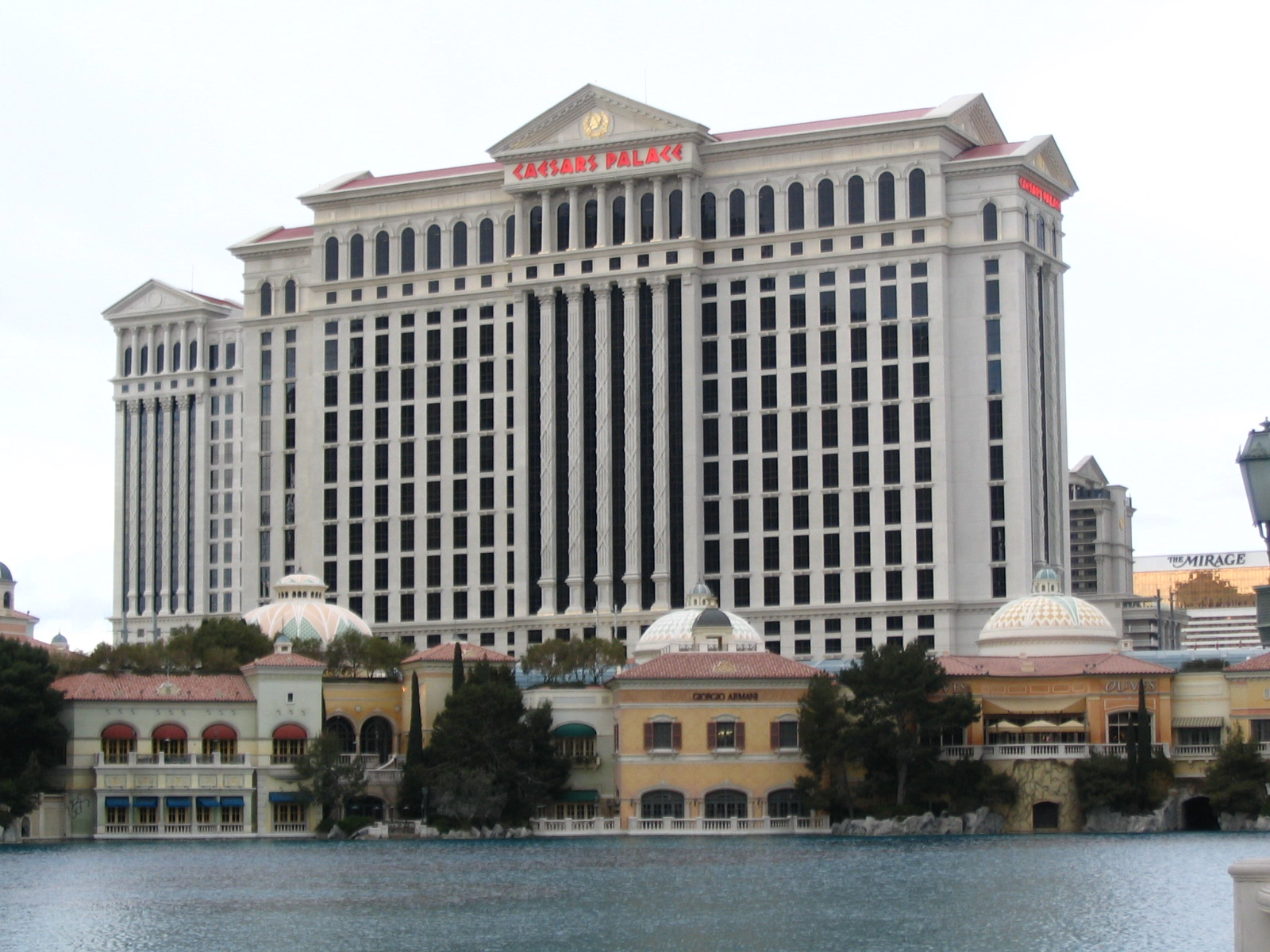
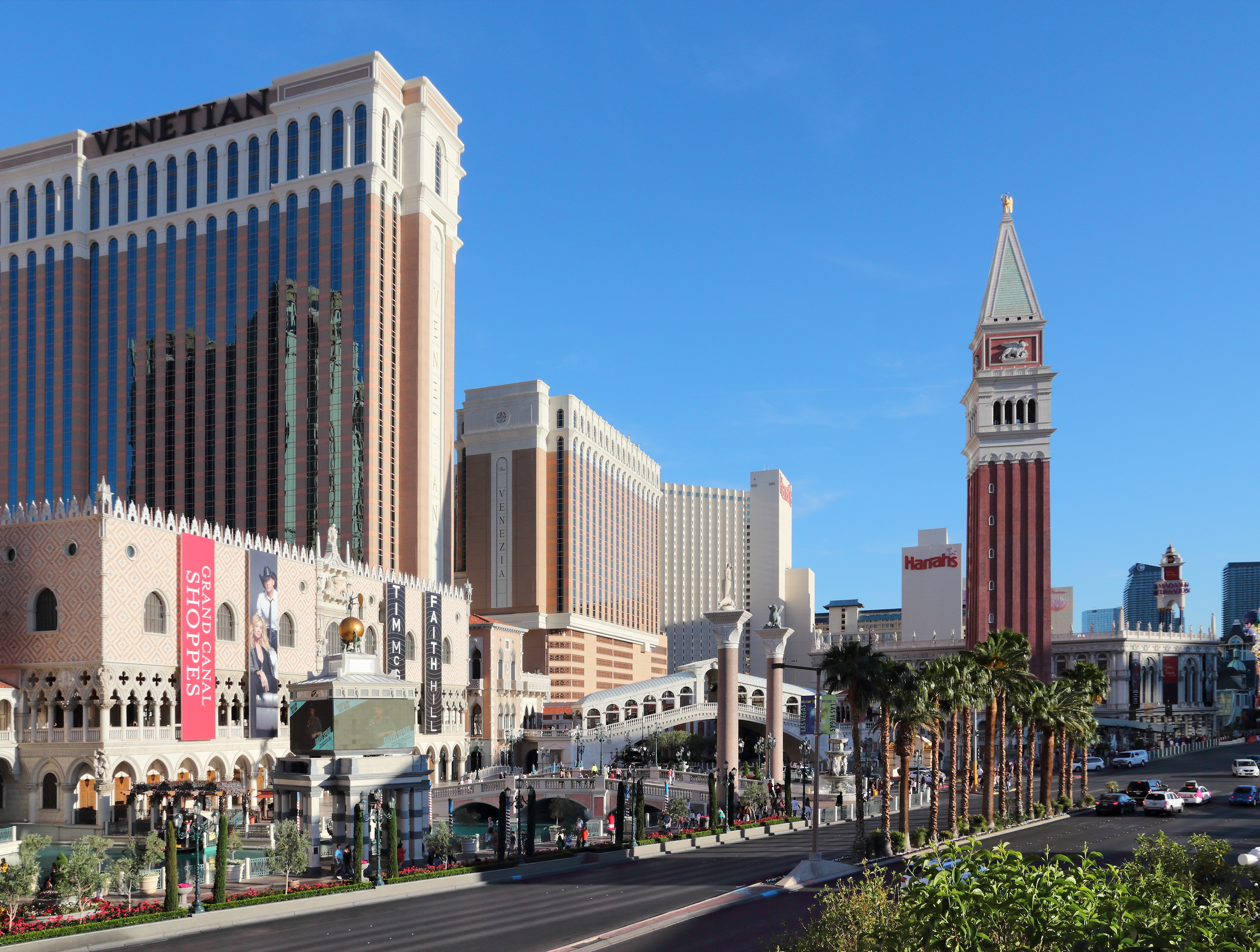
- Clockwise from top: Las Vegas Boulevard, MGM Grand Las Vegas, New York-New York, The Venetian Las Vegas, Caesars Palace, Horseshoe Las Vegas & Paris Las Vegas, Bellagio
- Interactive map of Las Vegas Strip
- Length: 4.2 mi (6.8 km)
- Coordinates: 36.1200°N 115.1725°W
- South end: Russell Road
- North end: Sahara Avenue

The Las Vegas Strip is a stretch of Las Vegas Boulevard in Clark County, Nevada, that is known for its concentration of resort hotels and casinos. The Strip, as it is colloquially known, is about 4.2 mi (6.8 km) long, and is immediately south of the Las Vegas city limits in the unincorporated towns of Paradise and Winchester, but is often referred to simply as "Las Vegas".

Many of the largest hotel casino and resort properties in the world are on the Strip. Its hotels, casinos, restaurants, residential high-rises, entertainment offerings, and skyline have established the Strip as one of the most popular and iconic tourist destinations in the world and is one of the driving forces for Las Vegas's economy. Most of the Strip has been designated as an All-American Road, and the North and South Las Vegas Strip routes are classified as Nevada Scenic Byways and National Scenic Byways.

== Boundaries ==
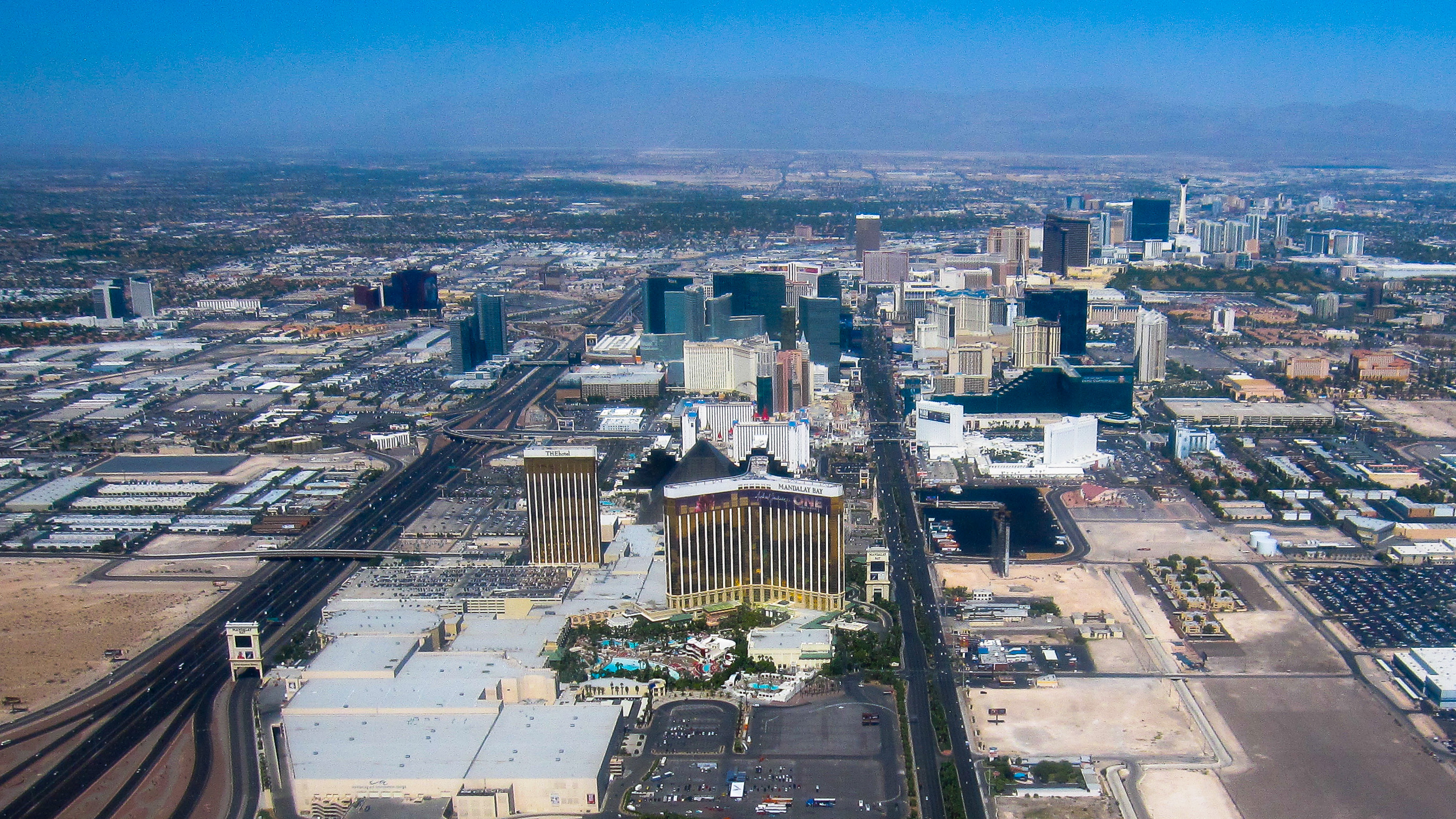
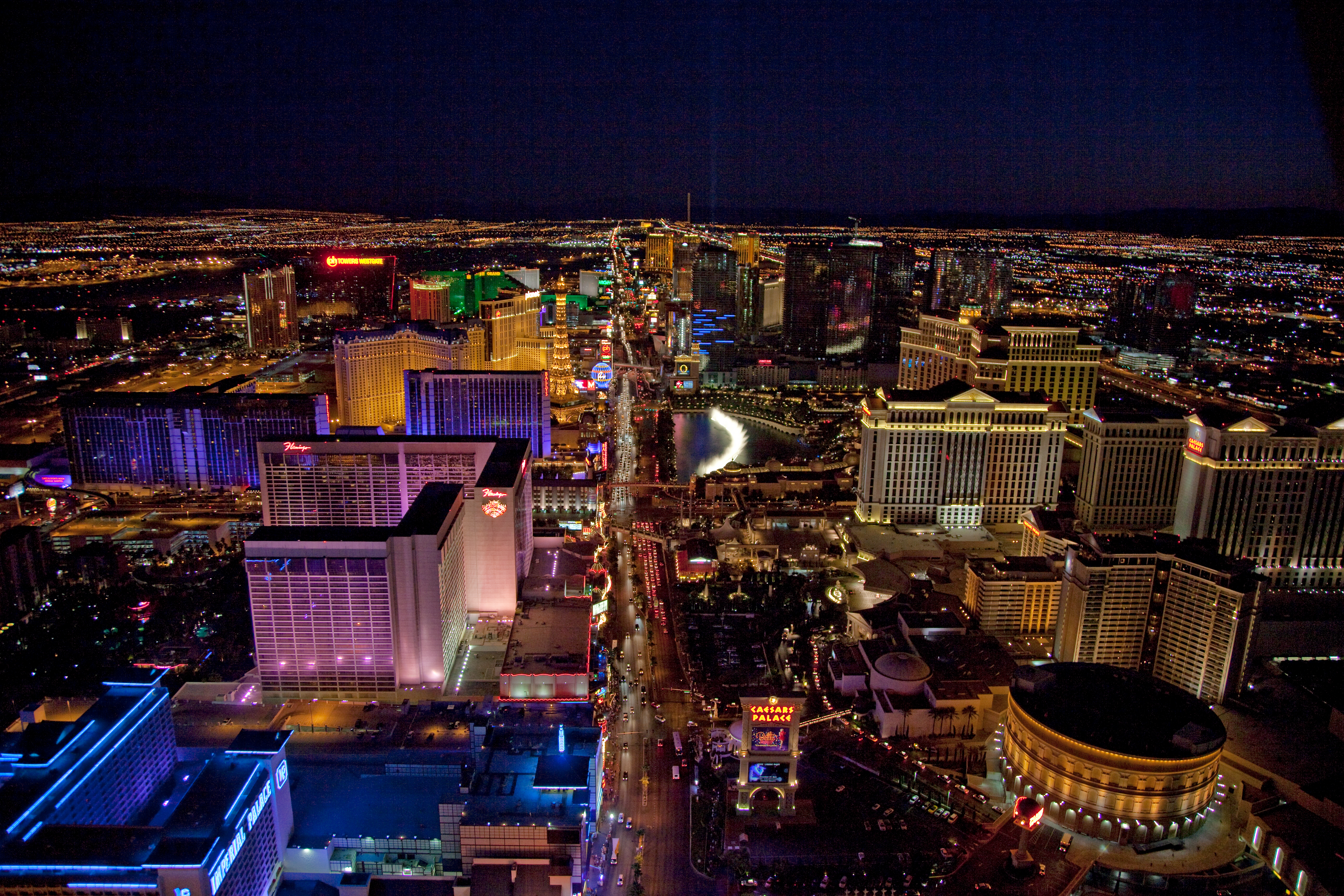
Looking north and south, 2013

Historically, casinos that were not in Downtown Las Vegas along Fremont Street sat outside the city limits on Las Vegas Boulevard. In 1959, the Welcome to Fabulous Las Vegas sign was built exactly 4.5 miles (7.2 km) outside the city limits. The sign is currently located in the median just south of Russell Road which is 4.2 miles (6.8 km) from The Sahara, about 0.4 miles (0.64 km) south of the southernmost entrance to Mandalay Bay, which is the Strip's southernmost casino.

In the strictest sense, the Strip refers only to the stretch of Las Vegas Boulevard that is roughly between Sahara Avenue and the "Welcome to Fabulous Las Vegas" sign. Clark County uses the phrase Resort Corridor to describe the area including Las Vegas Boulevard between 215 Beltway and Sahara Avenue and surrounding areas.

The Sahara is considered the Strip's northern terminus by Clark County, though travel guides typically extend it to the Strat 0.4 miles (0.64 km) to the north. Mandalay Bay, just north of Russell Road is the southernmost resort considered to be on the Strip. According to Clark County, the southern end of the Strip is the "Welcome to Fabulous Las Vegas" sign; the county acknowledges that some argue for Russell Road at the southernmost terminus.

Las Vegas Strip: day and night
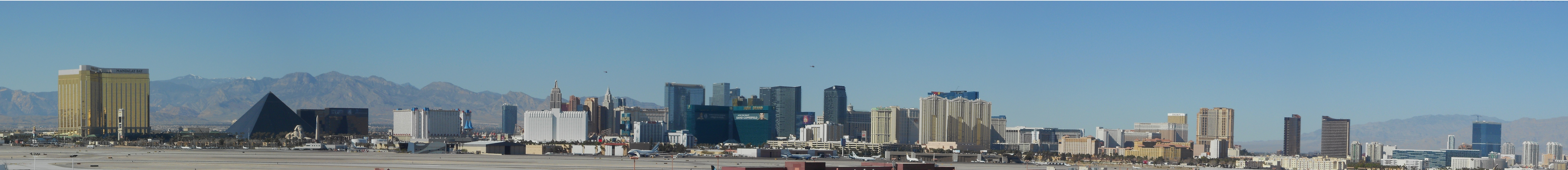
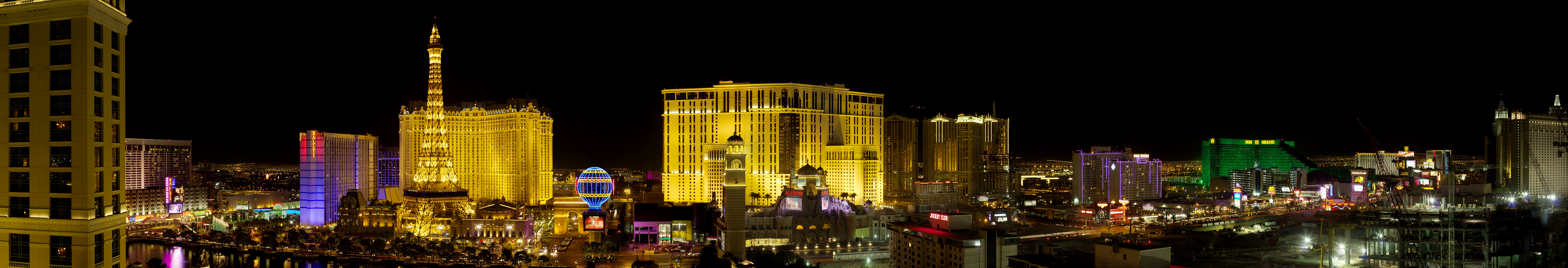

== History ==
=== Early years (1930s–1990s) ===
The first casino to be built on Highway 91 was the Pair-o-Dice Club in 1931, but the first full service casino-resort on what is currently called the Strip was the El Rancho Vegas, which opened with 63 bungalow hotel rooms on April 3, 1941. Its success spawned a second nearby hotel, the Hotel Last Frontier in 1942. Organized crime figures such as Bugsy Siegel took an intense interest in the growing Las Vegas gambling center and funded another resort; financing the completion of the Flamingo construction with mob money. The Flamingo casino opened in December 1946, and the hotel opened in March 1947. Wilbur Clark's Desert Inn resort opened in 1950. The funding for many Las Vegas projects was provided through the American National Insurance Company, which was based in the then-notorious gambling empire of Galveston, Texas.

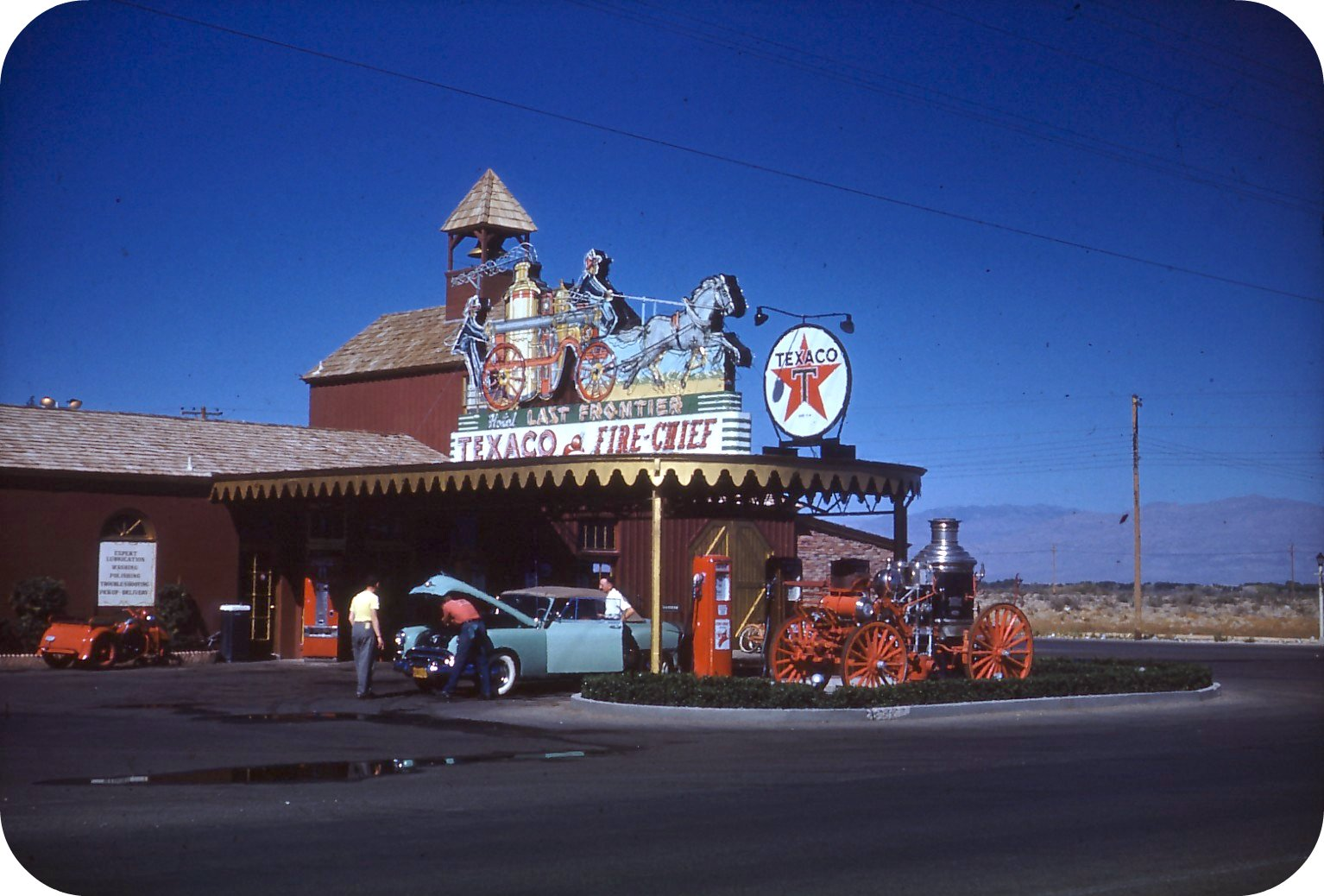
The Strip in late 1940s. Pictured is the gas station of the Hotel Last Frontier, the second hotel on the Strip.

Las Vegas Boulevard South was previously called Hwy 91, or the Arrowhead Highway, or Los Angeles Highway. The Strip was named by Los Angeles police officer and businessman Guy McAfee, after his hometown's Sunset Strip in Hollywood.

==== Unincorporated town ====
In 1950, Mayor Ernie Cragin of the City of Las Vegas sought to annex the Las Vegas Strip, which ran through unincorporated Clark County territory, in order to expand the city's tax base to fund his ambitious building agenda and pay down the city's rising debt. Instead, Gus Greenbaum of the Flamingo led a group of casino executives to lobby the Clark County commissioners for town status. Two unincorporated towns were eventually created, Paradise and Winchester. More than two decades later, the Supreme Court of Nevada struck down a 1975 Nevada state law that would have folded the Strip and the rest of the urban areas of Clark County into the City of Las Vegas.

Caesars Palace was established in 1966, with Armenian American billionaire Kirk Kerkorian as the landlord. Opening in 1969, Kerkorian then established the International Hotel, with 1,512 rooms, beginning the era of mega-resorts. The International is known as Westgate Las Vegas today.

The first MGM Grand Hotel and Casino was opened by Kerkorian in 1973 with 2,084 rooms. On November 21, 1980, MGM Grand suffered the worst resort fire in the history of Las Vegas as a result of electrical problems, killing 87 people. It reopened eight months later. In 1986, Kerkorian sold the MGM Grand to Bally Manufacturing, and it was renamed Bally's.

==== Mega-resorts ====
In 1986, Kerkorian founded MGM Resorts International to begin operating resorts in Las Vegas. The opening of The Mirage in 1989 set a new level to the Las Vegas experience, as smaller hotels and casinos made way for the larger mega-resorts. In the 1990s, more than 12 new hotels opened, including themed hotels like the Luxor, Excalibur, and Mandalay Bay. At $1.7B, the most expensive hotel in the world at the time, The Bellagio, was built in the 1990s. In 1993, the launch of the Mystère show at the new Treasure Island hotel by Cirque du Soleil marked a key point in transforming Las Vegas Strip entertainment.

In an effort to attract families, resorts offered more attractions geared toward youth, but had limited success. The current MGM Grand opened in 1993.

Currently, the MGM Resorts International owns and operates several properties, including the current MGM Grand, The Bellagio, The New York-New York, Mandalay Bay, Luxor, Excalibur, Park MGM, The Cosmopolitan and The CityCenter complex in Las Vegas.

In addition to the large hotels, casinos and resorts, the Strip is home to many attractions, such as M&M's World, Adventuredome and the Fashion Show Mall.

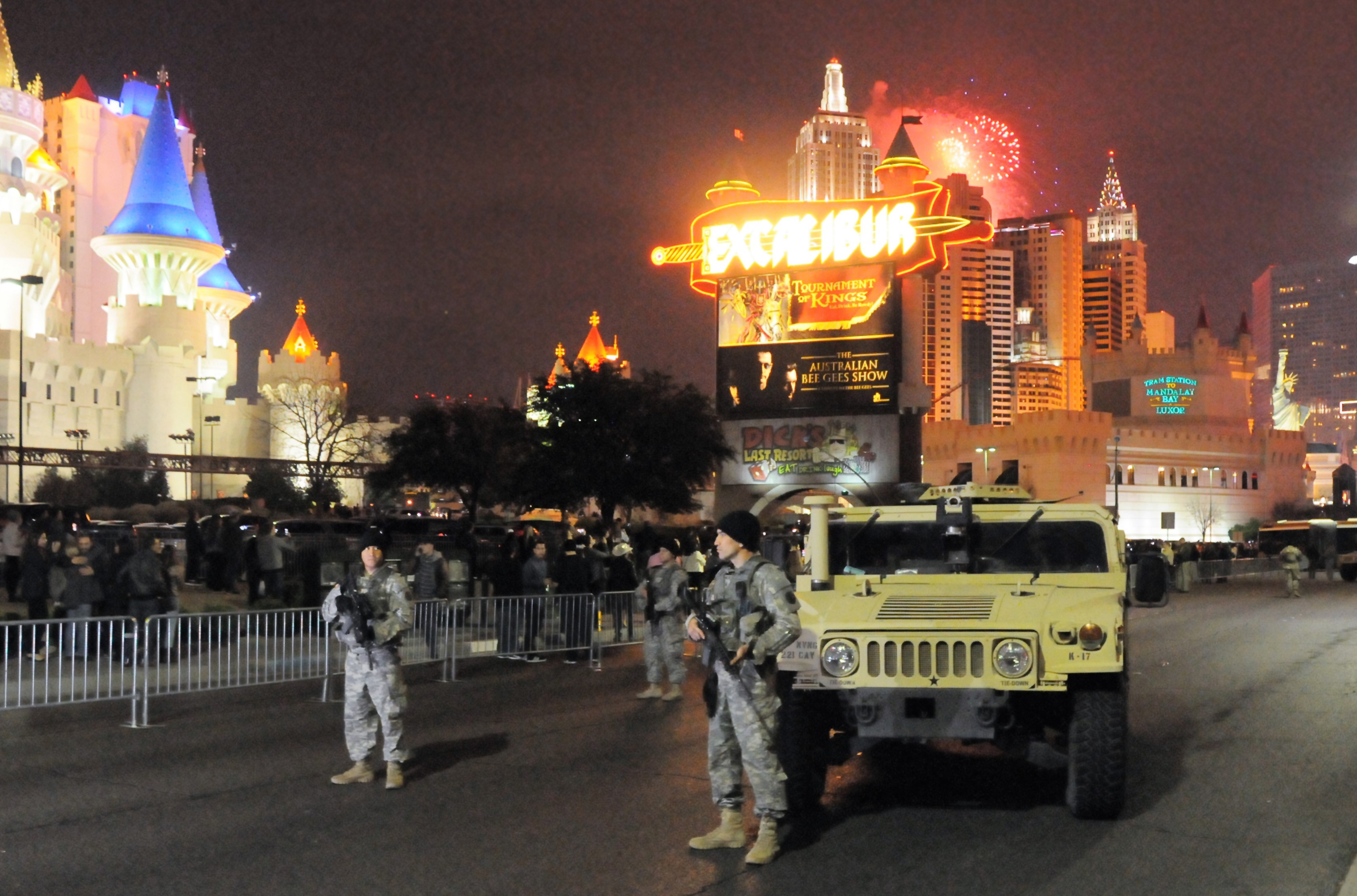
Nevada National Guard assist with New Year's Eve security.

=== More Expansions (1998-2016) ===
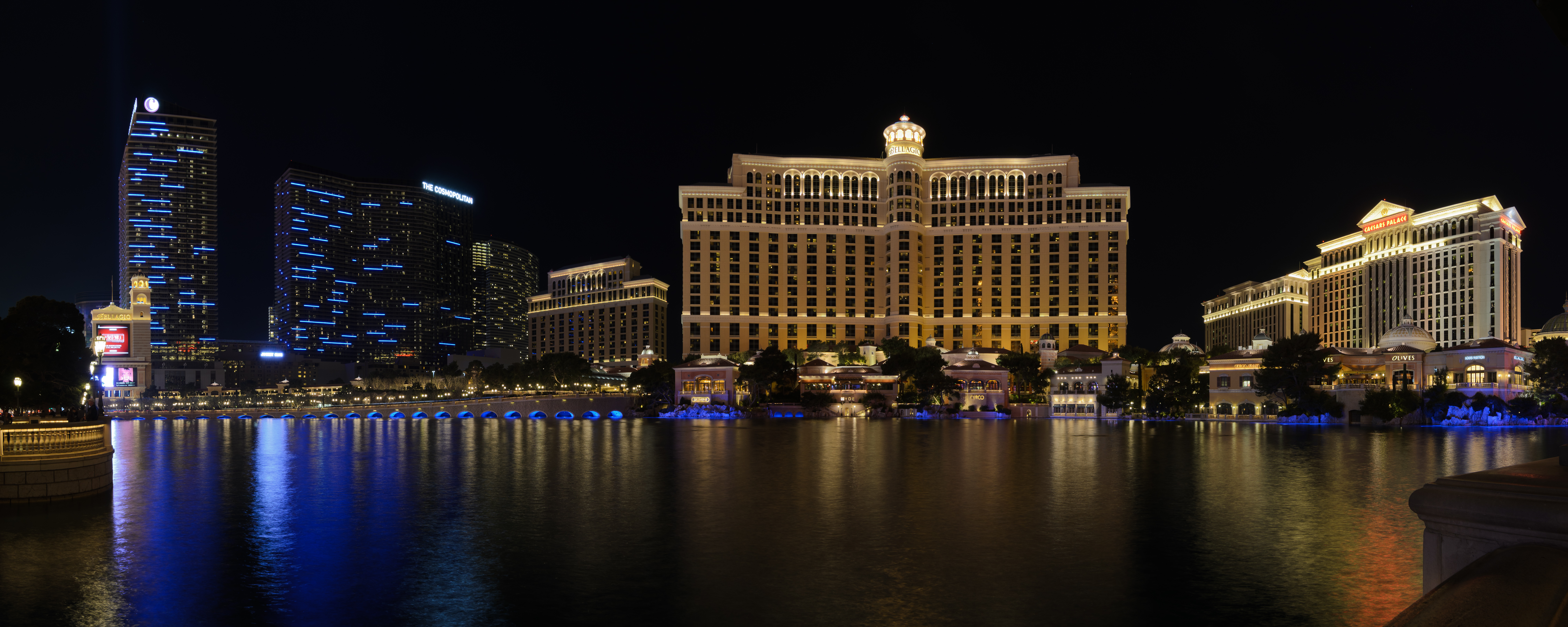
Four-segment panorama of The Cosmopolitan, Bellagio, and Caesars Palace (left to right) from the Las Vegas Strip, across from the Bellagio fountains

With the opening of the Bellagio (1998), Venetian (1999), Wynn (2005), Palazzo (2007), and Encore (2008) resorts, the Strip trended towards the luxurious high-end segment through most of the 2000s, while some older resorts added major expansions and renovations, including some de-theming of the earlier themed hotels.

Announced in 2004 and built between 2006 and 2009, CityCenter, a 66-acre (27 ha), $8.5 billion (in 2009 USD; equivalent to $16.1 billion in March 2025) multi-use project on the former site of the Boardwalk hotel and adjoining land. Most elements of the project opened in late 2009.

In 2012, the High Roller Ferris wheel and a retail district called The Linq Promenade broke ground in an attempt to diversify attractions beyond that of casino resorts. Renovations and rebrandings such as The Cromwell Las Vegas and the SLS Las Vegas continued to transform the Strip in 2014. The Las Vegas Festival Grounds opened in 2015. In 2016, T-Mobile Arena, The Park, and the Park Theater (now known as Dolby Live) opened.

=== 2017 Music Festival Shooting ===
On October 1, 2017, a gunman, later identified as 64-year old Stephen Paddock, opened fire from is 32-floor suite inside the Mandalay Bay hotel at the nearby Route 91 Harvest Music Festival, killing 58 and injuring another 867, with Stephen Paddock later found dead from a self-inflected gun wound to the head by police. The entire attack lasted around 11 minutes. Two of the victims would later succumb to their injuries in both 2019 and 2020 respectively, officially bringing the total death toll to 60 (or 61 including the perpetrator). This incident remains the deadliest mass shooting in U.S. history, surpassing the 2016 Pulse Nightclub Shooting.

=== Recent History (2021-Present) ===
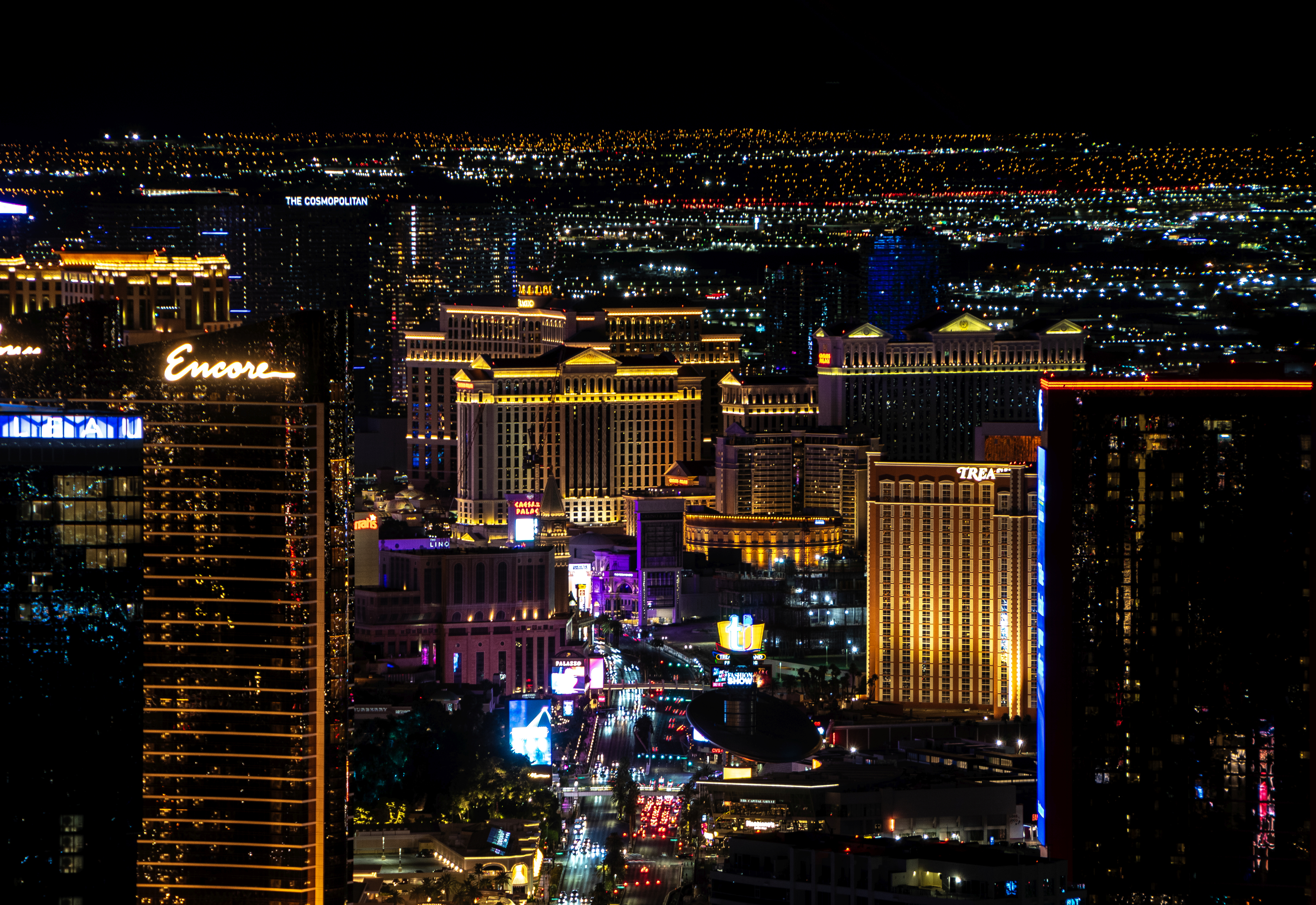
The Las Vegas Strip as viewed from the Strat Observation Deck, 2025

In 2021, the Pinball Hall of Fame moved near the "Fabulous Las Vegas" sign at the south end of the Strip. Later that year, Resorts World Las Vegas opened in June on the site of the former Stardust Resort and Casino.

The Sphere opened in September 2023. Also, the Fontainebleau Las Vegas opened on the site of the former El Rancho Hotel and Casino and Algiers Hotel in December 2023.

BLVD, a three-story shopping center, opened in November 2024 with several additional tenants opened and others set to debut in 2026.

=== Future developments ===
The Tropicana was demolished in October 2024. It will be replaced with a new Bally's Las Vegas resort and New Las Vegas Stadium which will become the home of the Athletics after they relocate to Las Vegas from their temporary home in Sacramento. The stadium and hotel are set to open in 2028 for the 2028 MLB season. The Mirage also closed in July 2024, but will reopen as the Hard Rock Las Vegas in 2027.

On August 31, 2026, a new road will be built to intersect Las Vegas Boulevard and Russell Road, making it the Strip's first new intersection in 60 years. The road, which will be called "Diamond Arena Drive," will bypass Las Vegas Boulevard and provide access to a new NBA stadium.

== Transportation ==
=== Buses ===
RTC Transit (previously Citizens Area Transit, or CAT) provides bus service on the Strip with double-decker buses known as The Deuce. The Deuce runs between the Welcome to Fabulous Las Vegas sign and South Strip Transfer Terminal to the Bonneville Transit Center (BTC) and the Fremont Street Experience in Downtown Las Vegas, with stops near every casino.

=== Trams ===
Several free trams operate between properties on the west side of the Strip:

- Mandalay Bay Tram connecting the Mandalay Bay, Luxor, and Excalibur
- Aria Express connecting Park MGM, Crystals (also stop for Aria), and Bellagio
- Hard Rock-Treasure Island Tram (temporarily closed) runs between Treasure Island and Hard Rock Las Vegas
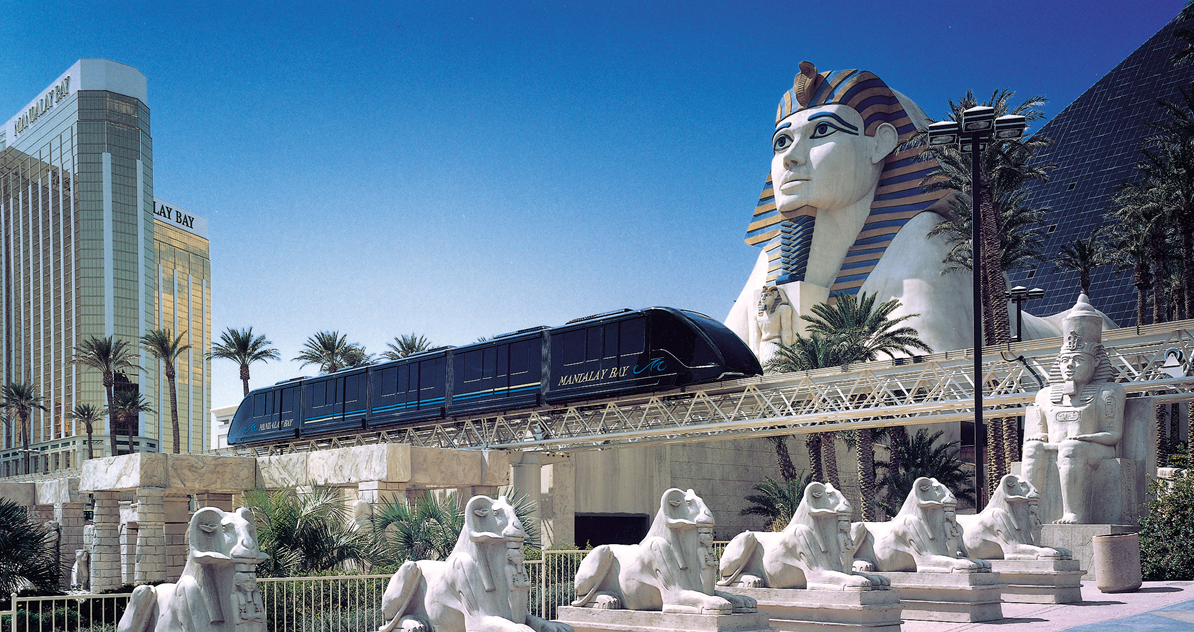
Mandalay Bay Tram

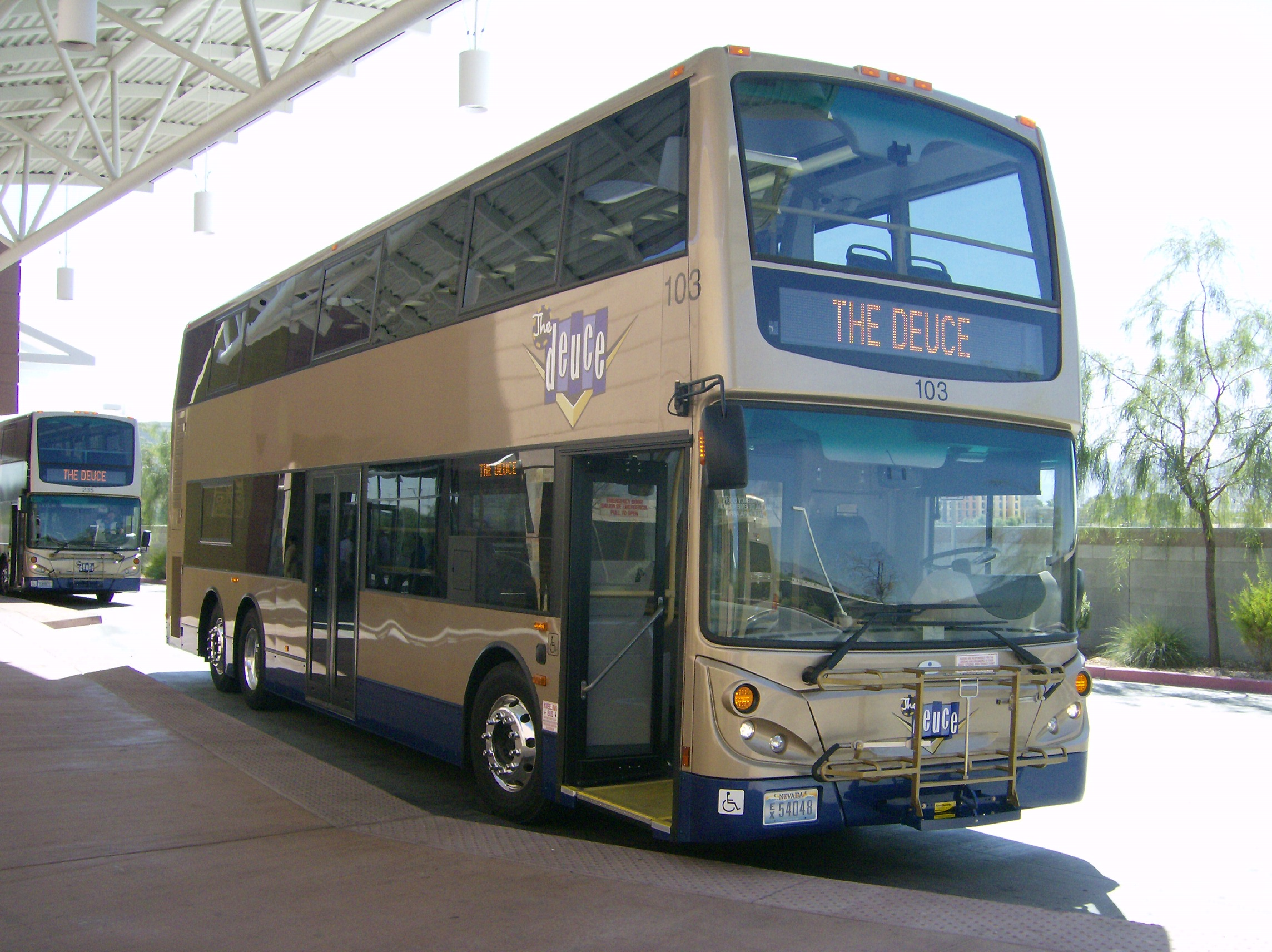
The Deuce bus

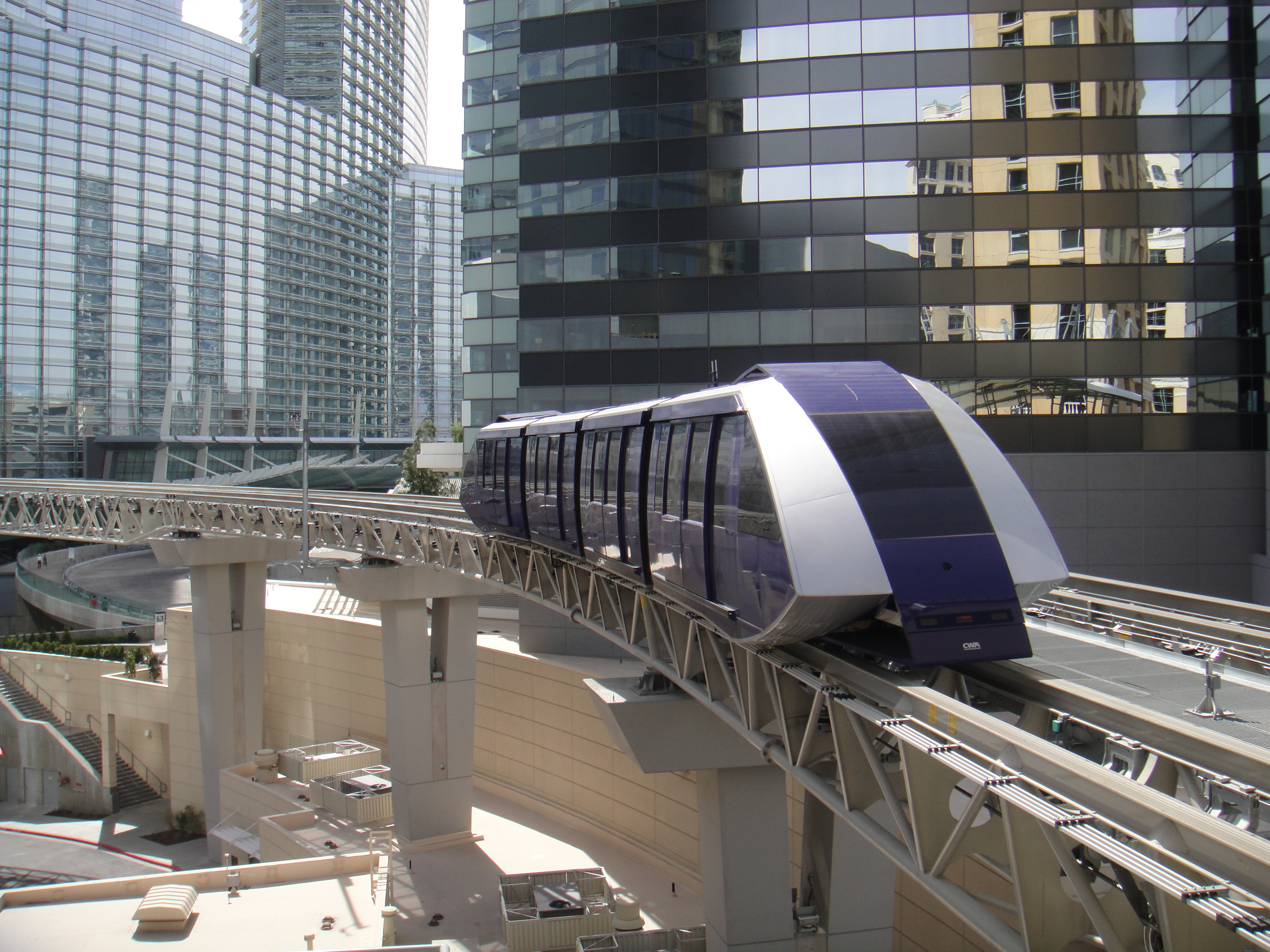
Aria Express

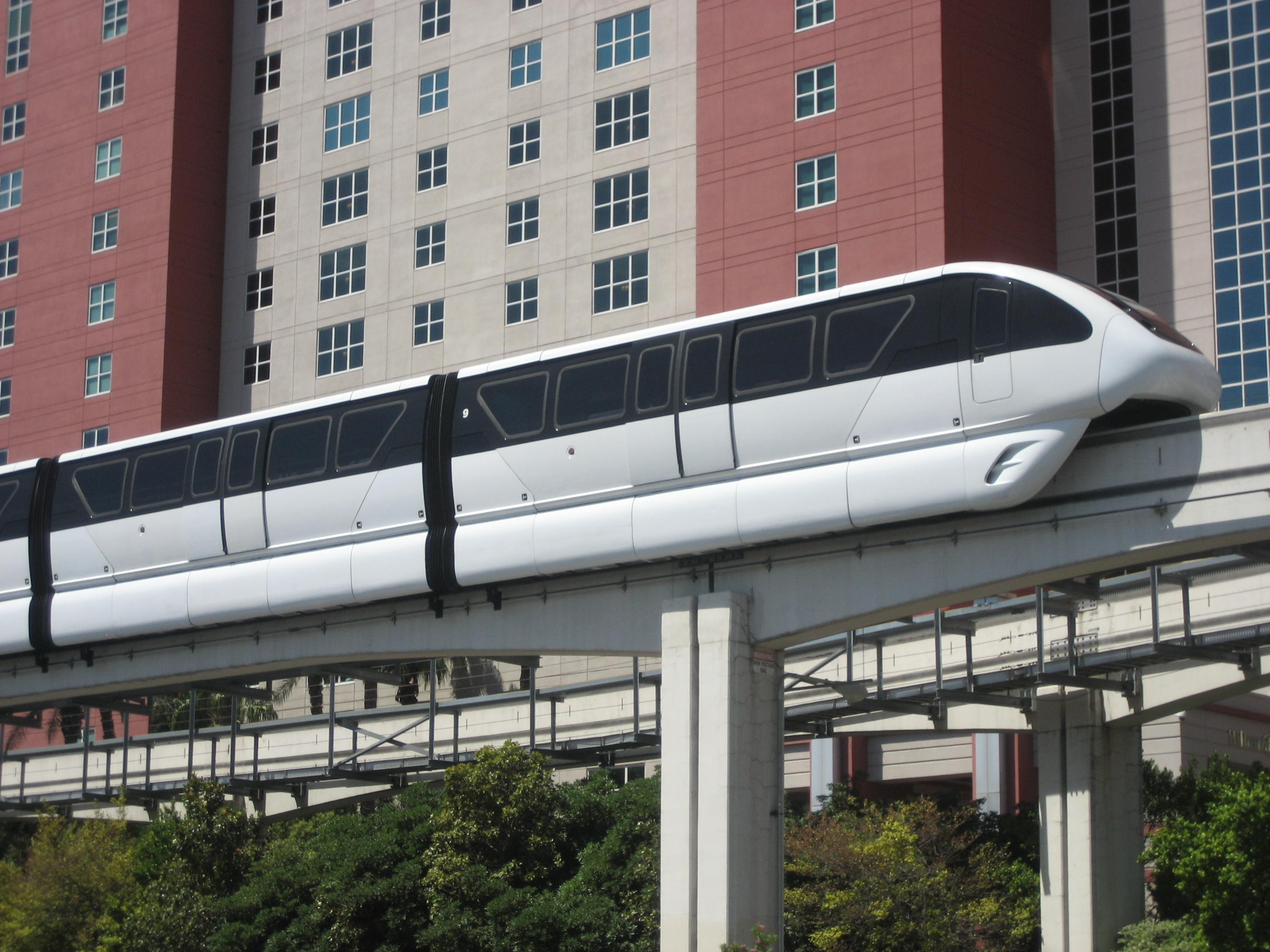
The Las Vegas Monorail

=== Monorail ===
While not on the Strip itself, the Las Vegas Monorail runs a 3.9-mile route on the east side of the Strip corridor from Tropicana Avenue to Sahara Avenue, with stops every 4 to 8 minutes at several on-Strip properties including the MGM Grand and the Sahara at each end of the route. The stations include:

- SAHARA Las Vegas Station
- Westgate Station
- Las Vegas Convention Center Station
- Harrah's/The LINQ Station
- Flamingo/Caesars Palace Station
- Horseshoe/Paris Station
- MGM Grand Station

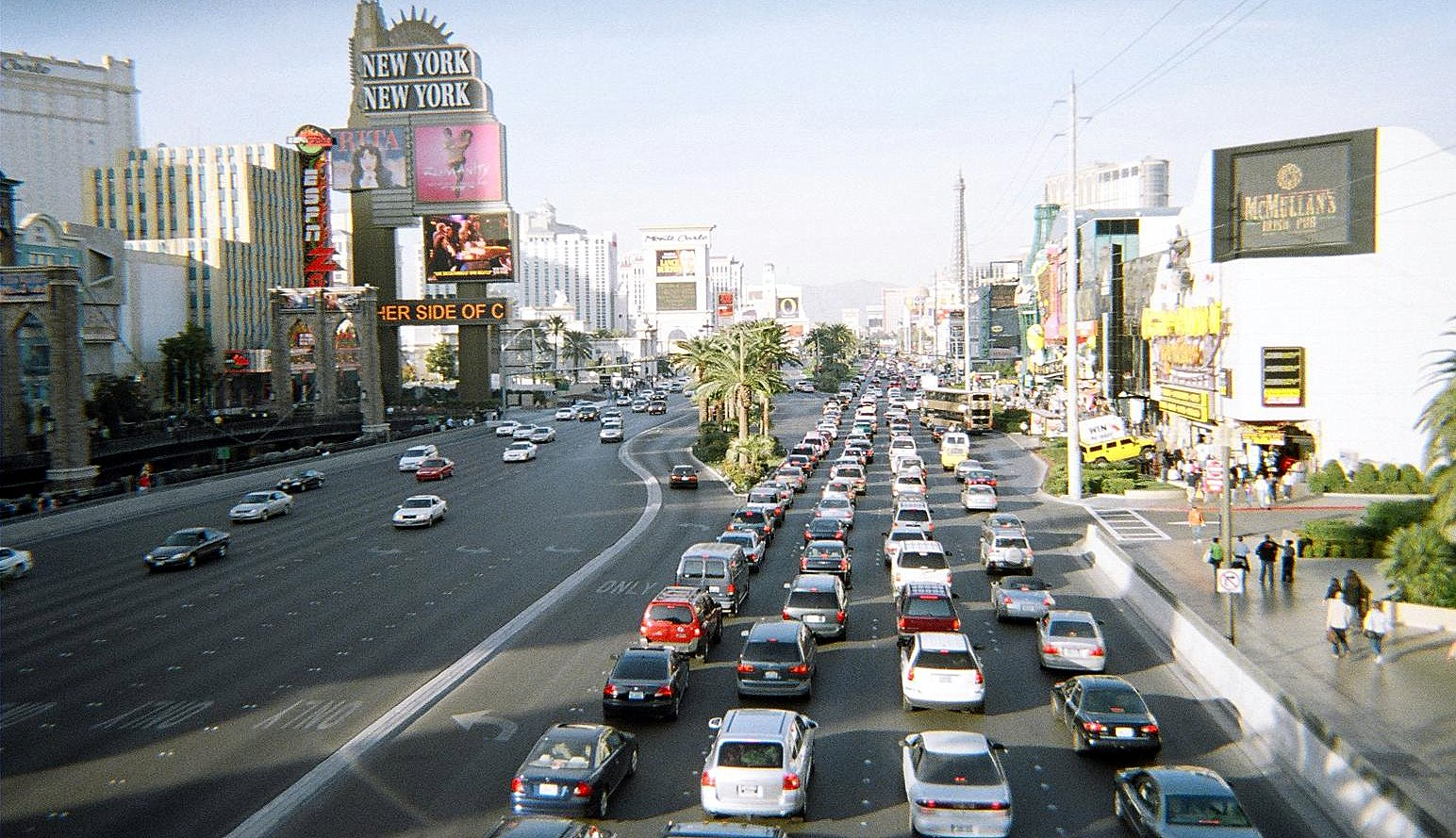
The Strip traffic during the day, looking north from the MGM Grand. The strip has a number of pedestrian footbridges.

The monorail began operating in 1995 with two trains from Walt Disney World. In 2020, the monorail was acquired by the Las Vegas Convention and Visitors Authority (LVCVA).

=== Pedestrian traffic ===
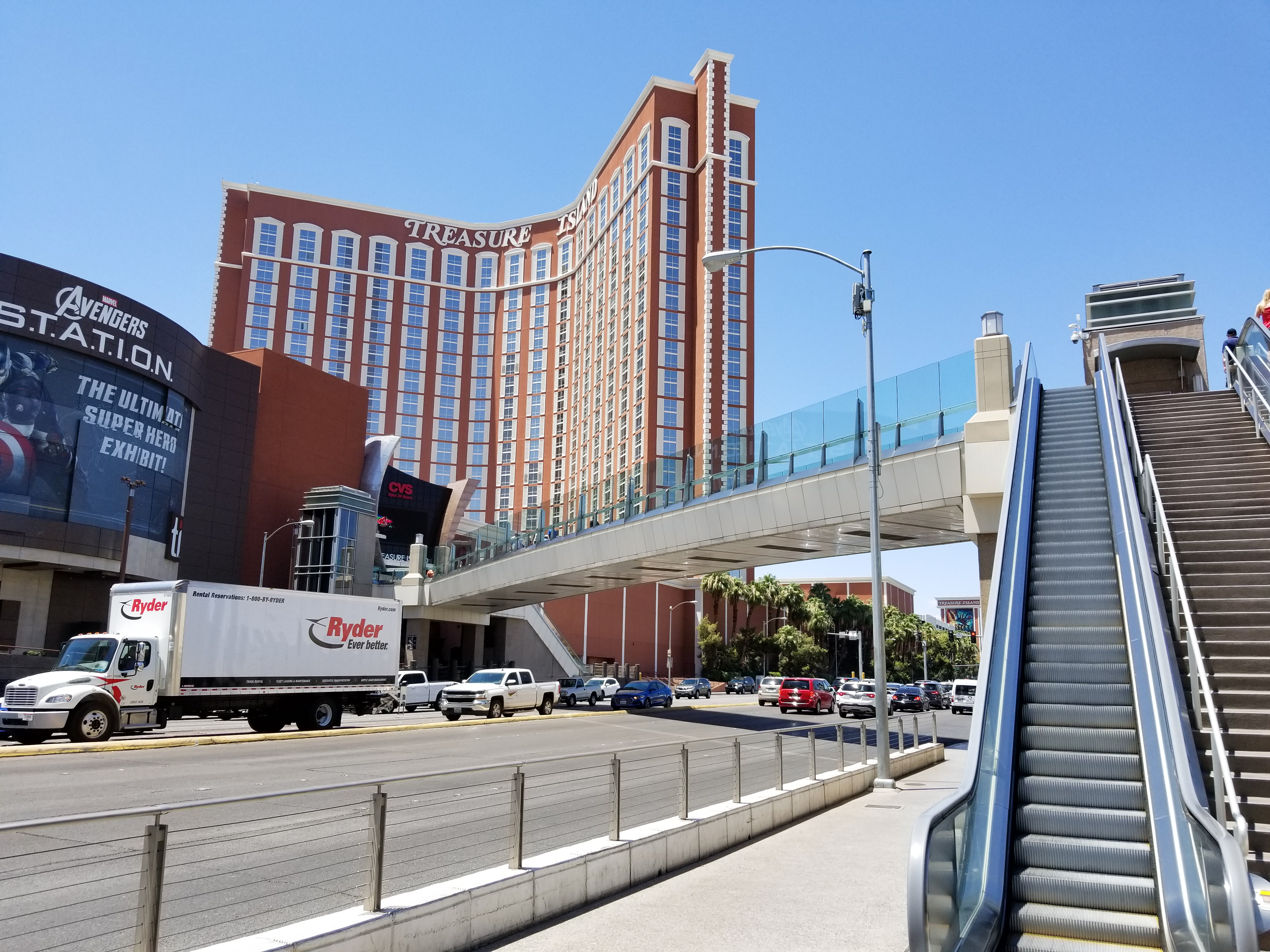
Elevated pedestrian footbridge at the corner of Spring Mountain Road and Las Vegas Blvd

Tens of thousands of pedestrians are walking along the Strip at any given time. As of 2019, about 50,000 pedestrians walked the Strip on an average day.

In the 1990s, several pedestrian footbridges were erected over Las Vegas Boulevard to increase pedestrian safety and alleviate traffic congestion at popular intersections. The first was the Tropicana – Las Vegas Boulevard footbridge. Some mimic the theme of nearby resorts. The footbridges include:

1. Veer Towers: Connects Veer Towers, Waldorf Astoria, and Crystals Shopping Center
2. Park MGM and T-Mobile Arena Park: Connects MGM and Showcase Mall
3. Planet Hollywood: Connects Planet Hollywood, CityCenter, Crystals Shopping Center, and The Cosmopolitan.
4. Spring Mountain Road and Las Vegas Blvd. Corner: Connects Treasure Island, the Wynn, Fashion Show Mall, and The Venetian
5. Flamingo Road and Las Vegas Blvd. Corner: Connects Bally's, Flamingo, Bellagio, and Caesars Palace
6. Las Vegas Blvd and Tropicana Ave Corner. Connects the MGM Grand, New York-New York, Excalibur, and Tropicana

=== Taxis ===
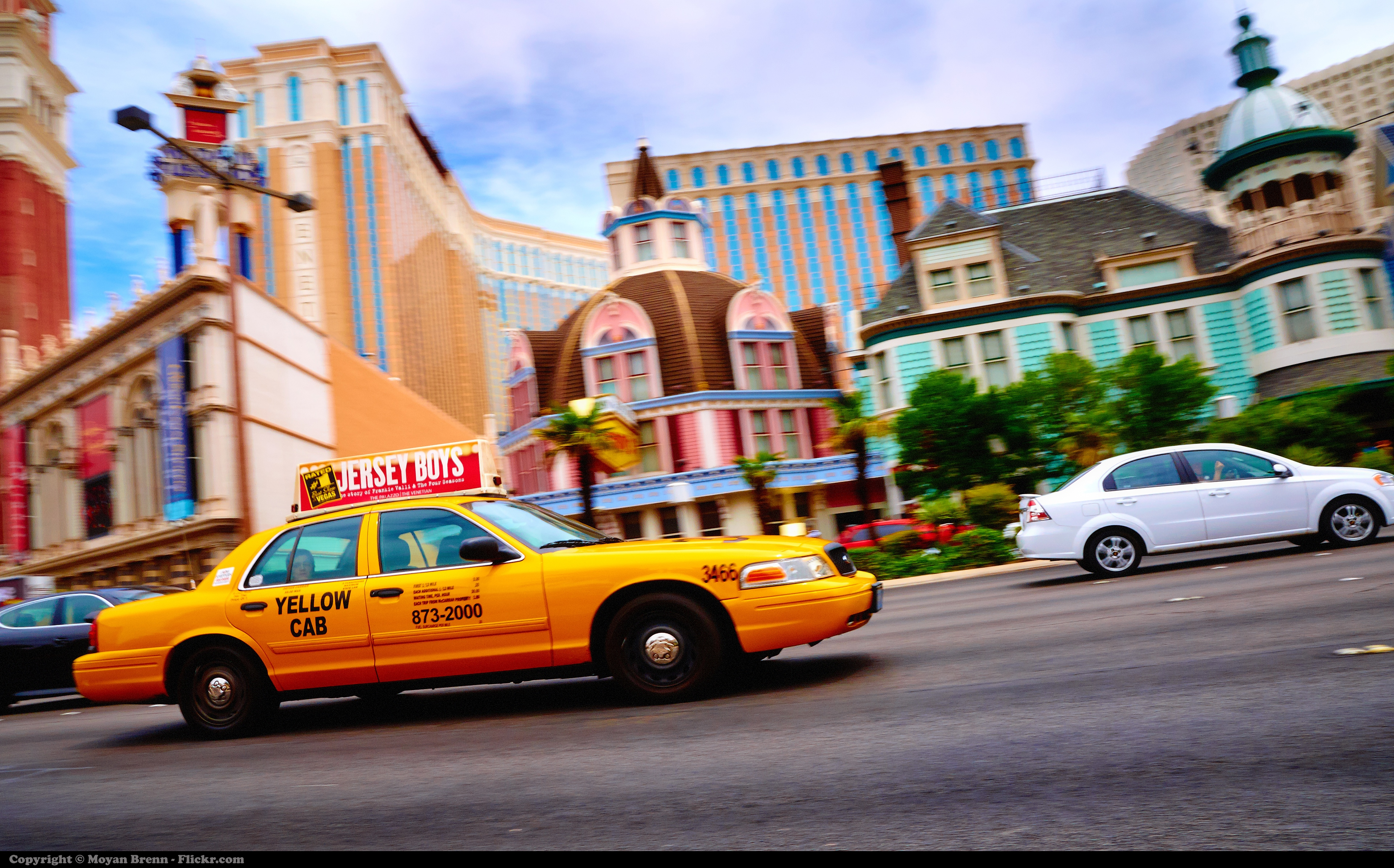
Taxi on the Las Vegas Strip

Taxis are available at resorts, shopping centers, attractions, and for scheduled pickups. The Nevada Taxicab Authority provides information about taxi fares and fare zones.

== Attractions on the Strip ==
=== Gambling ===
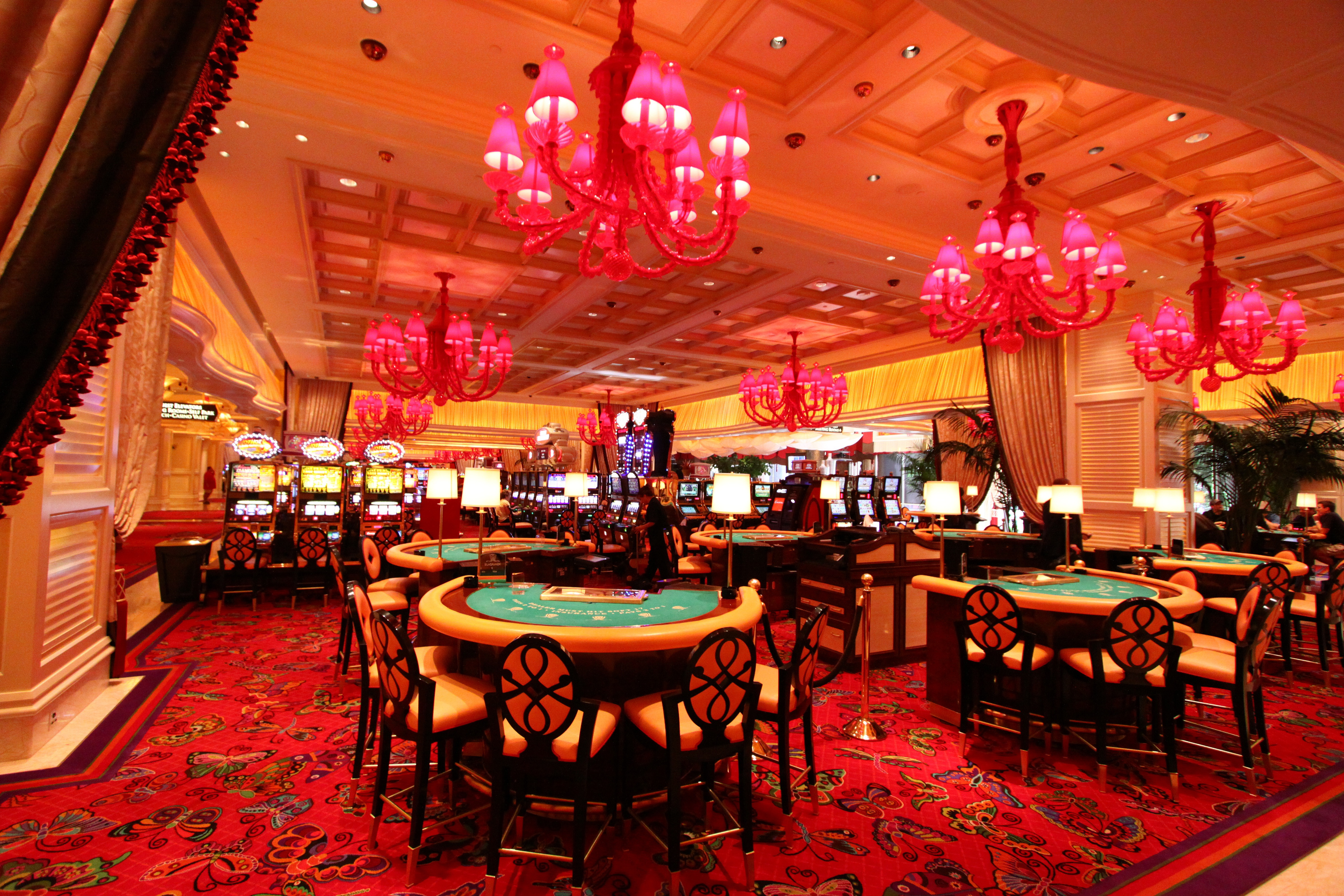
Casino floor at the Wynn

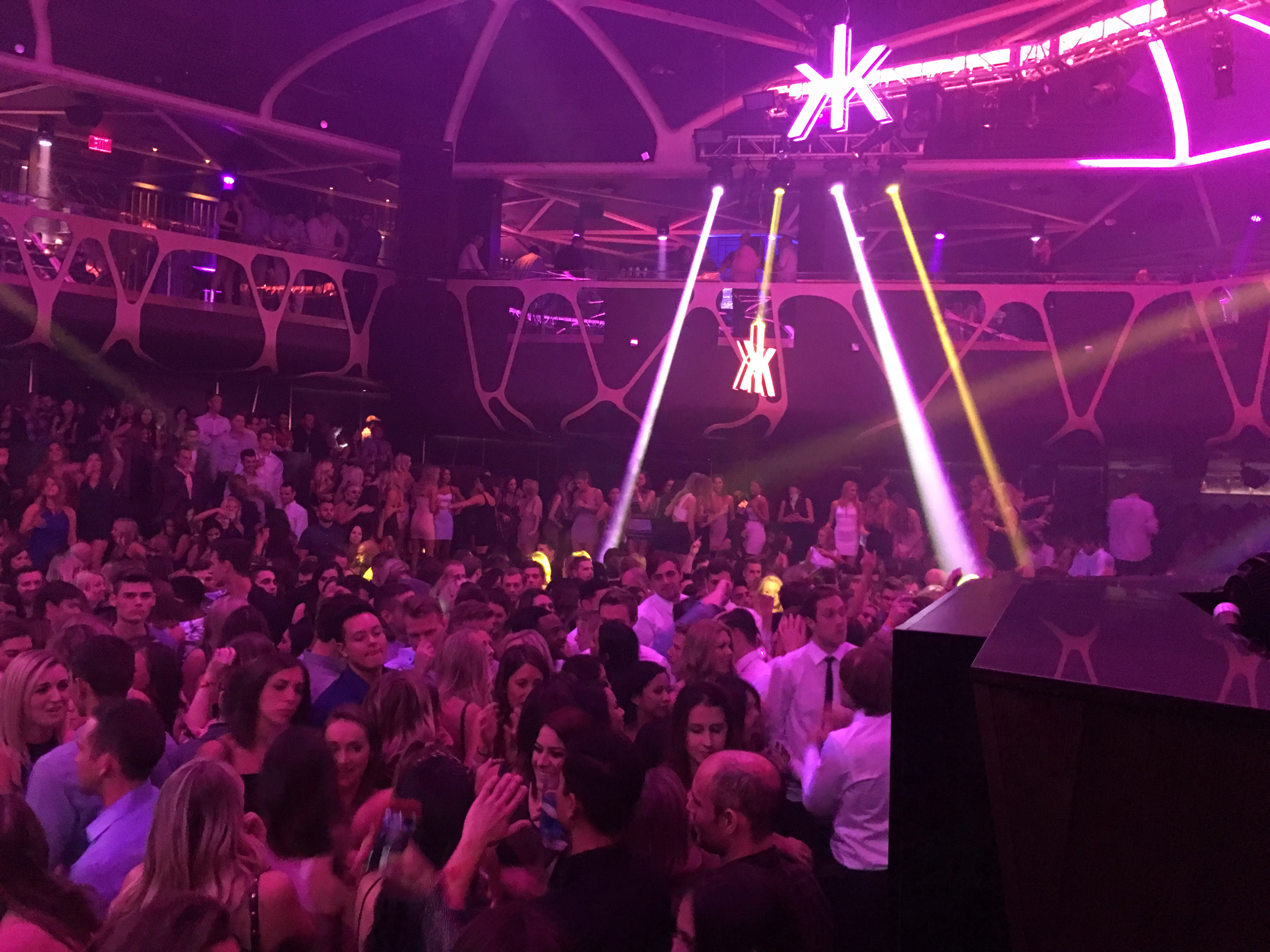
Hakkasan Nightclub at the MGM Grand

In 2019, about eight in ten (81%) visitors said they gambled while in Las Vegas, the highest proportion in the past five years. The average time spent gambling, 2.7 hours, represents an increase over the past three years. Also, the average trip gambling budget, $591.06, was increased from 2018. About nine in ten (89%) visitors who gambled did so on the Strip Corridor. UNLV reported that in 2019, Big Las Vegas Strip Casinos (defined as Strip casinos with more than $72M in annual gaming revenues) had more than $6B in annual gaming revenues, corresponding to about 26% of total annual revenues.

From the time period spanning 1985 to 2019, there have been some changes in the mix of table games in casinos on the Strip:

- Blackjack: The number of tables decreased from 77% in 1985 to 50% in 2019. Revenue decreased from 50% in 1985 to 11% in 2019.
- Craps: Revenue decreased from 28% in 1985 to 11% in 2019.
- Roulette: Both the number of tables and revenue increased by 50%.
- Baccarat: About 2% of tables and 13% revenue in 1985 to 13% of tables and 37% of revenue in 2019.
- Additional games: Games such as pai gow poker, three-card poker, and mini-baccarat have increased in popularity, number of tables, and revenue.

Casino operators have been expanding sports betting facilities and products, as well as renovating and upgrading equipment and facilities. Although sports betting has a relatively low margin, the high-end sportsbooks can generate significant amounts of revenue in other areas, such as food and drink. As a result, sportsbooks have been expanding and upgrading food and drink offerings. High-end sportsbooks include features such as single-seat stadium-style seating, large high-definition screens, a dedicated broadcast booth, and the ability to watch up to 15 sporting events at once. The sports network ESPN is broadcasting sports betting shows from a dedicated studio at The Linq. Some sportsbooks are now offering self-service betting kiosks.

=== Entertainment ===
The Las Vegas Strip is known for its lounges, showrooms, theaters and nightclubs, most on the hotel casino properties. Some of the more popular free attractions visible from the Strip include the water fountains at Bellagio, the volcano at The Mirage (now shuttered with the closing of The Mirage), and the Fall of Atlantis and Festival Fountain at Caesars Palace. There are several Cirque du Soleil shows, such as Kà at the MGM Grand, O at Bellagio, Mystère at Treasure Island, and Michael Jackson: One at Mandalay Bay.

Many notable artists have performed in Las Vegas, including Elvis Presley, Frank Sinatra, Wayne Newton, Dean Martin, Sammy Davis Jr., Louis Prima, Tom Jones, Rod Stewart and Liberace, and in more recent years Celine Dion, Britney Spears, Barry Manilow, Cher, Elton John, Bette Midler, Diana Ross, Donny and Marie Osmond, Garth Brooks, Jennifer Lopez, Reba McEntire, Mariah Carey, Janet Jackson, Kylie Minogue, Shania Twain, Criss Angel, Olivia Newton-John, Queen + Adam Lambert, Lady Gaga, Katy Perry and Gwen Stefani have had residencies in the various resorts on the Strip. During 2019, 51% of visitors attended shows, which was down from 2015, 2017, and 2018. Among visitors who saw shows, relatively more went to Broadway/production shows than in past years, while relatively fewer saw lounge acts, comedy shows, or celebrity DJs.

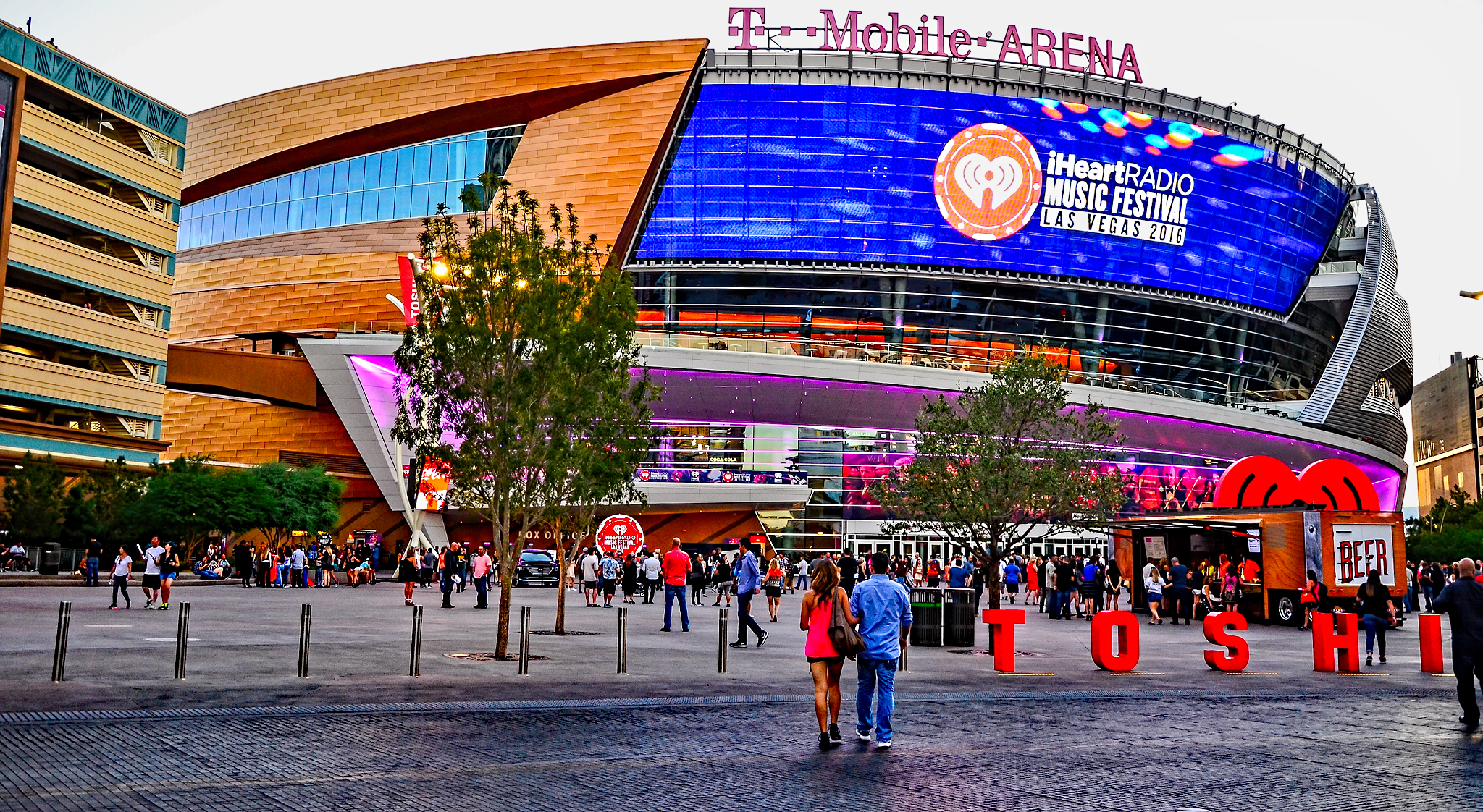
T-Mobile Arena

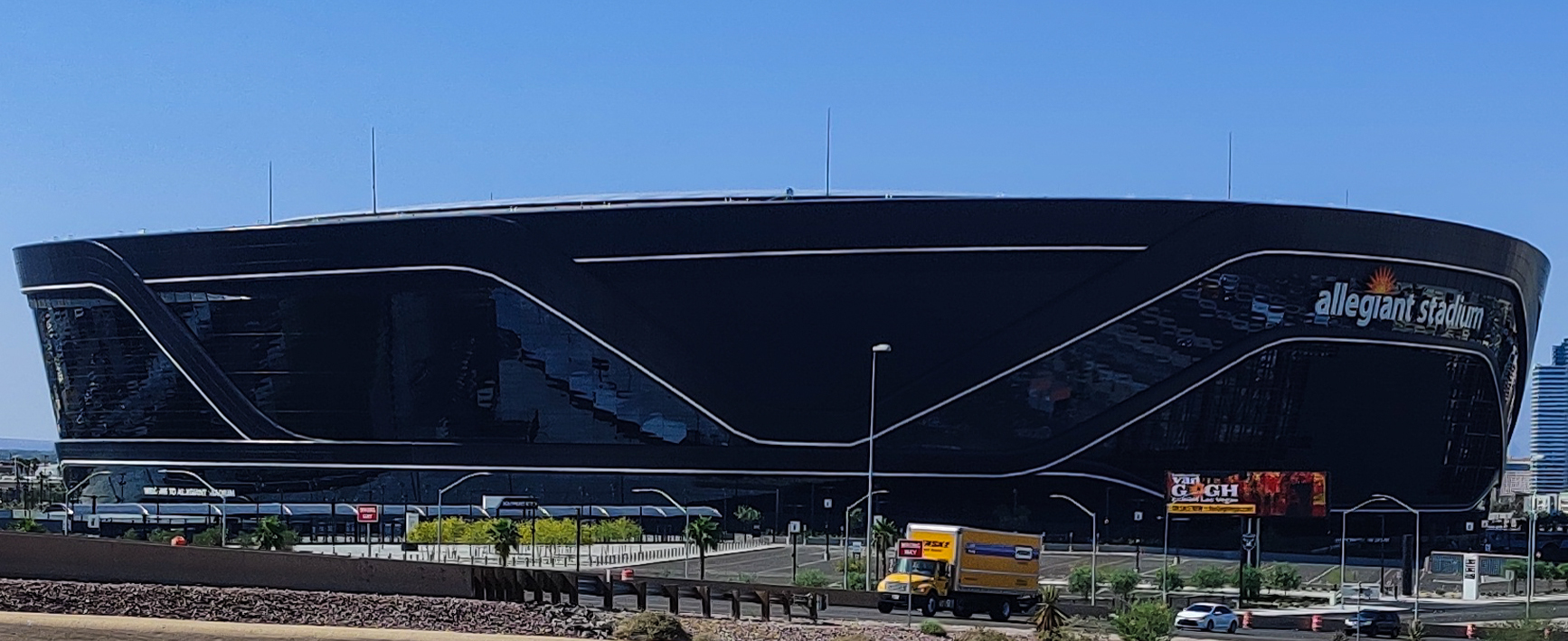
Allegiant Stadium

=== Venues ===
Numerous entertainment venues populate the Strip. Most of the resorts have a showroom, nightclub and/or live music venue on the property and a few have large multipurpose arenas. Major venues include:

- Allegiant Stadium
- The Colosseum at Caesars Palace
- Dolby Live
- Las Vegas Festival Grounds
- LVXP Las Vegas (planned)
- MGM Grand Garden Arena
- Michelob Ultra Arena
- PH Live
- Sphere
- T-Mobile Arena
- New Las Vegas Stadium (under construction)

=== Restaurants and dining ===
The Strip is populated with many restaurants and fine dining establishments, many of which are inside the casinos and resorts. In recent years, many celebrity chefs have opened restaurants along the Strip, including Wolfgang Puck, Michael Mina, Gordon Ramsay, Guy Savoy, and Joël Robuchon.

=== Shopping ===
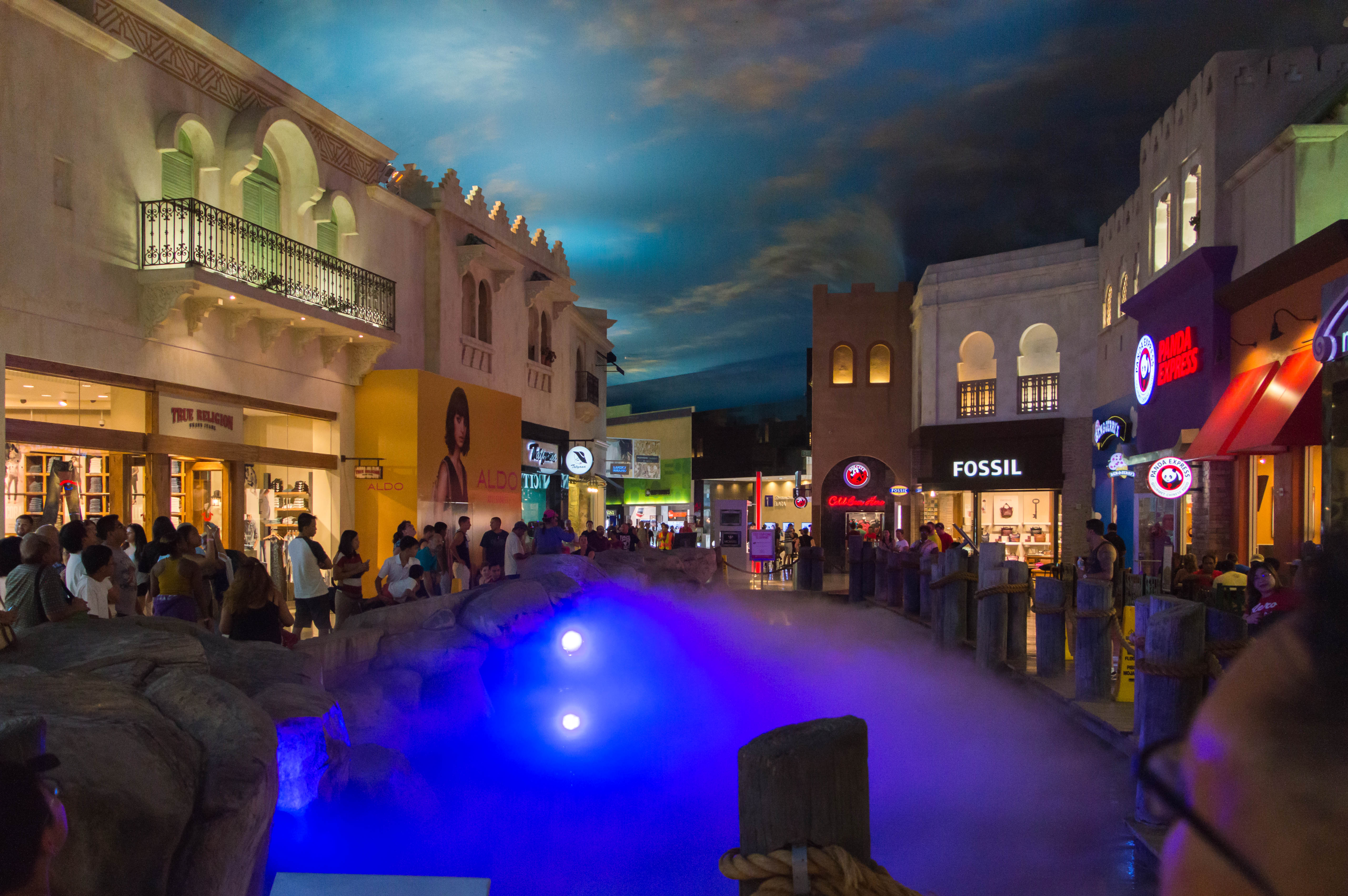
The Rainstorm Show at the Miracle Mile Shops at Planet Hollywood

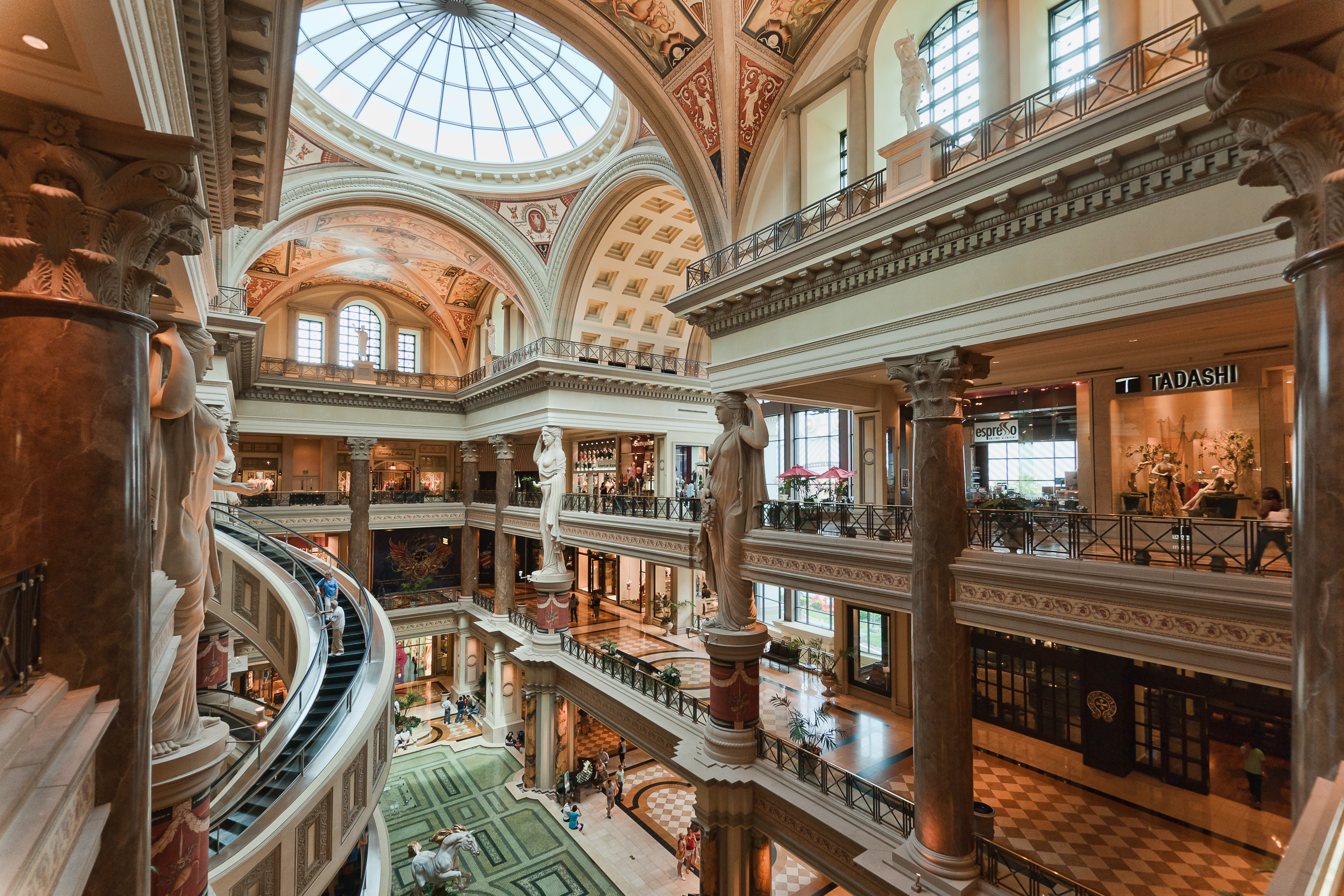
The Forum Shops at Caesar's Palace

- BLVD
- Bonanza Gift Shop is billed as the "World's Largest Gift Shop", with over 40,000 square feet (3,700 m^{2}) of shopping space.
- Fashion Show Mall is adjacent to Treasure Island and opposite Wynn Las Vegas.
- Grand Canal Shoppes is a luxury mall connected to the Venetian and Palazzo resorts. It features canals, gondolas and singing gondoliers.
- The Linq Promenade is an open-air retail, dining, and entertainment district located between The Linq and Flamingo resorts that began a soft open in January 2014. It leads from a Strip-side entrance to the High Roller.
- Miracle Mile Shops is part of the Planet Hollywood resort.
- The Forum Shops at Caesars is a luxury mall connected to Caesars Palace, with more than 160 shops and 11 restaurants.
- The Shops at Crystals is a luxury high-fashion mall at CityCenter.
- Harmon Corner is a three-story retail center located next to Planet Hollywood with shops and restaurants.
- Showcase Mall is next to MGM Grand, and displays a 100-foot Coca-Cola bottle.
- The Park, a short east–west street between the Park MGM and New York-New York resorts is a park-like boulevard lined with retail shops and restaurants, leading to T-Mobile Arena.
- The Shoppes at Mandalay Place has shops and restaurants located on a sky bridge in between Mandalay Bay and Luxor.

=== Live sports ===
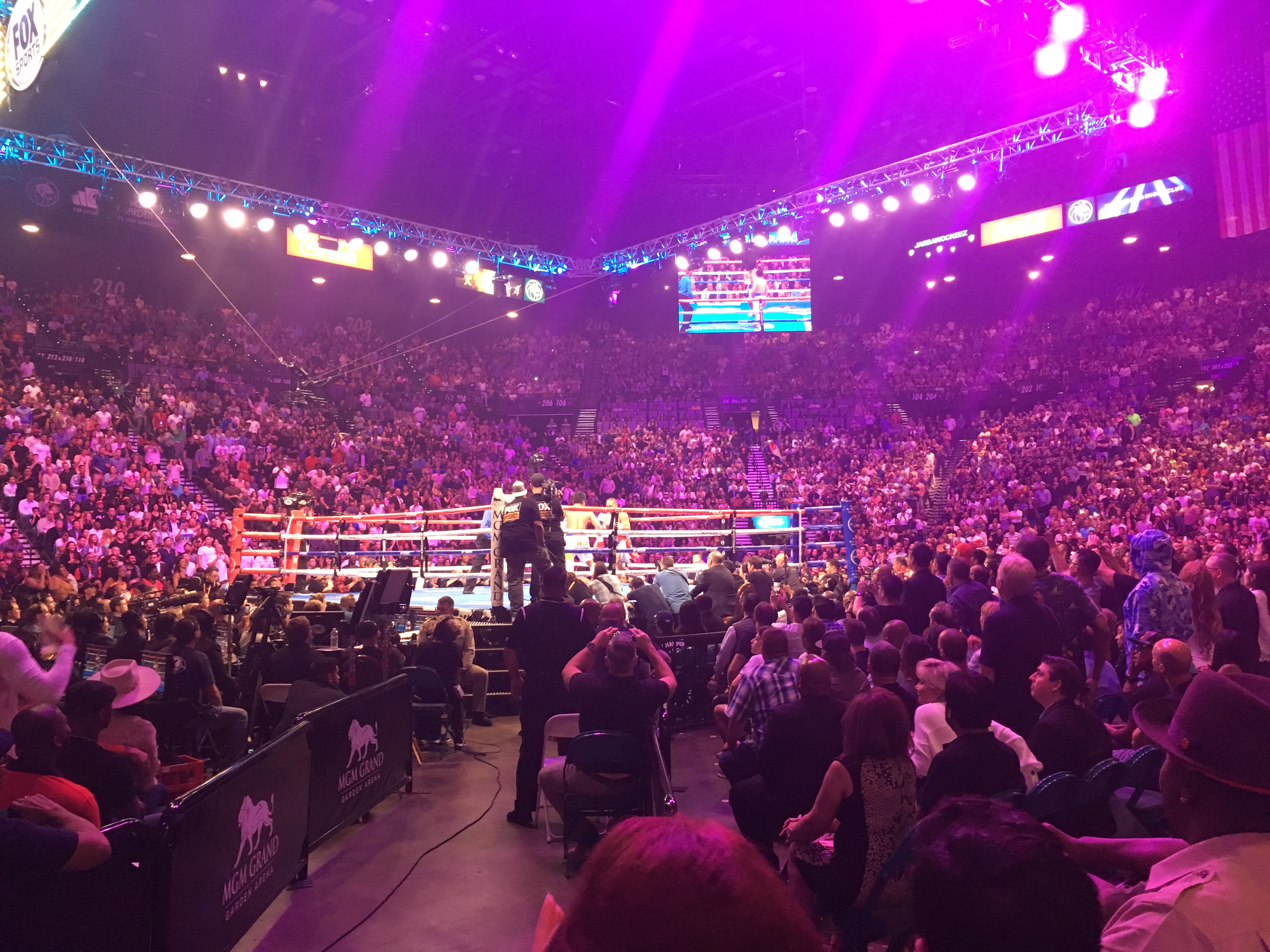
The MGM Grand Garden Arena hosting the boxing match of Manny Pacquiao vs. Keith Thurman on July 20, 2019

Professional sports are found at venues on or near the Strip, including:

- National Football League: Las Vegas Raiders at Allegiant Stadium
- National Hockey League: Vegas Golden Knights at T-Mobile Arena
- Mixed Martial Arts: Ultimate Fighting Championship at T-Mobile Arena
- Boxing: MGM Grand Garden Arena
- Women's National Basketball Association: Las Vegas Aces at the Michelob Ultra Arena

The Strip also hosts the Las Vegas Grand Prix which has been part of the Formula One World Championship since 2023. It will also house the New Las Vegas Stadium for the Athletics of Major League Baseball in 2028 when the team relocates to the Las Vegas Valley. In 2024, an NBA-ready arena on the Strip was proposed as part of the planned LVXP resort development.

=== Golf ===
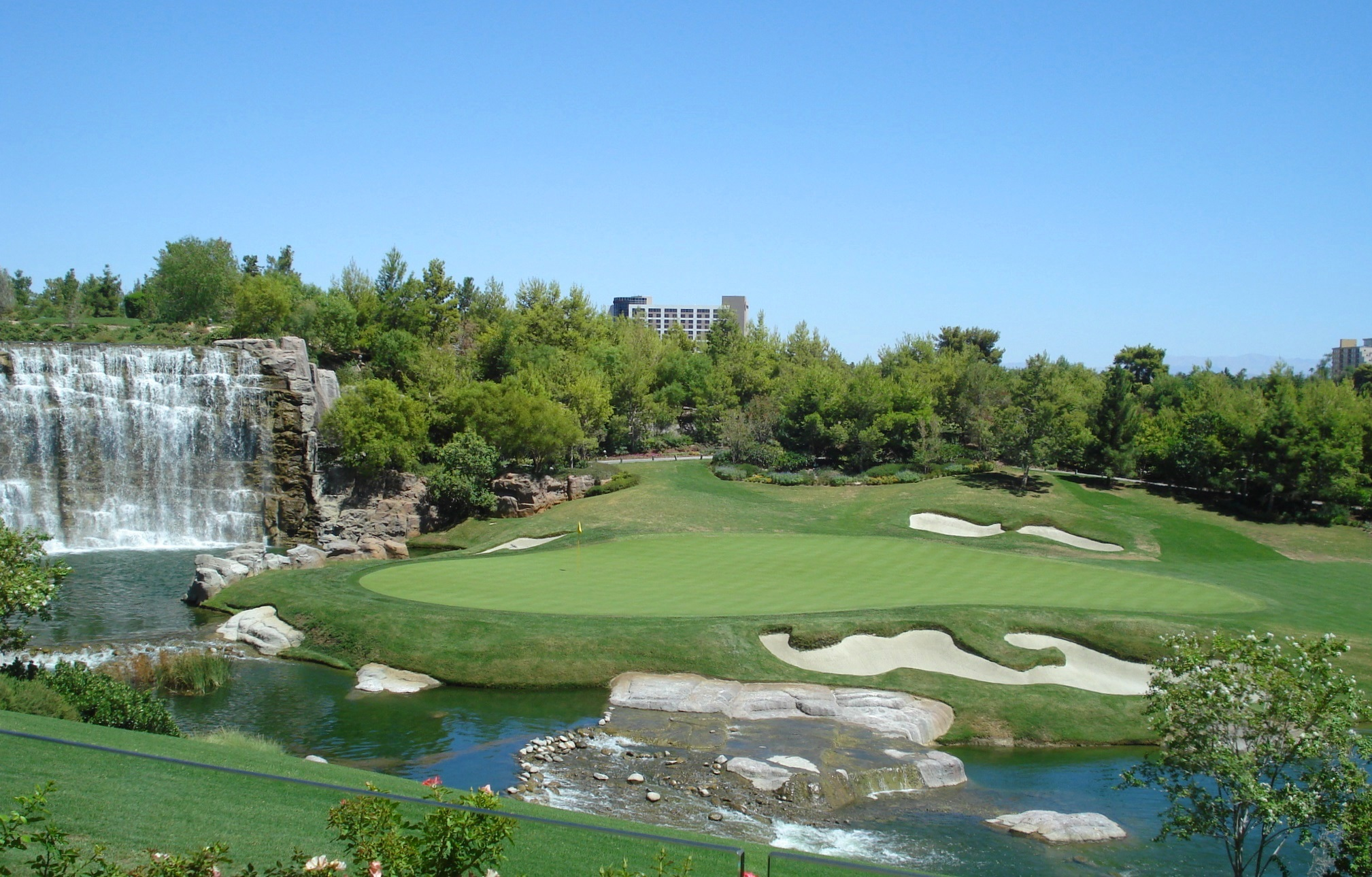
Wynn Golf and Country Club

The Aladdin had a nine-hole golf course in the 1960s. As land values on the Strip have increased over the years, the resort-affiliated golf courses have been removed to make way for building projects. The Tropicana Country Club closed in 1990 and the Dunes golf course in the mid-90s. Steve Wynn, founder of previously owned Mirage Resorts, purchased the Desert Inn and golf course for his new company Wynn Resorts and redeveloped the course as the Wynn Golf Club. This course closed in 2017, but the development planned for the course was cancelled and the course was renovated and re-opened in late 2019. In 2000, Bali Hai Golf Club opened just south of Mandalay Bay and the Strip. In 2016, a TopGolf opened near the Strip.

=== Amusement parks and rides ===
Adventuredome indoor amusement park at Circus Circus on the Strip is a major tourist attraction; it is enclosed in glass, with a carousel, mini-golf, two roller coasters, bowling, spinning rides, an arcade, virtual reality rides, a carnival midway, and clown shows.

The Stratosphere tower has several rides:

- Big Shot
- SkyJump Las Vegas
- X-Scream
- Insanity (inactive)

Other rides on the Strip include:

- Big Apple Coaster (formerly known as Manhattan Express (1997–2006) and The Roller Coaster (2007–2015))
- Fly Linq
- High Roller

== Sustainability ==
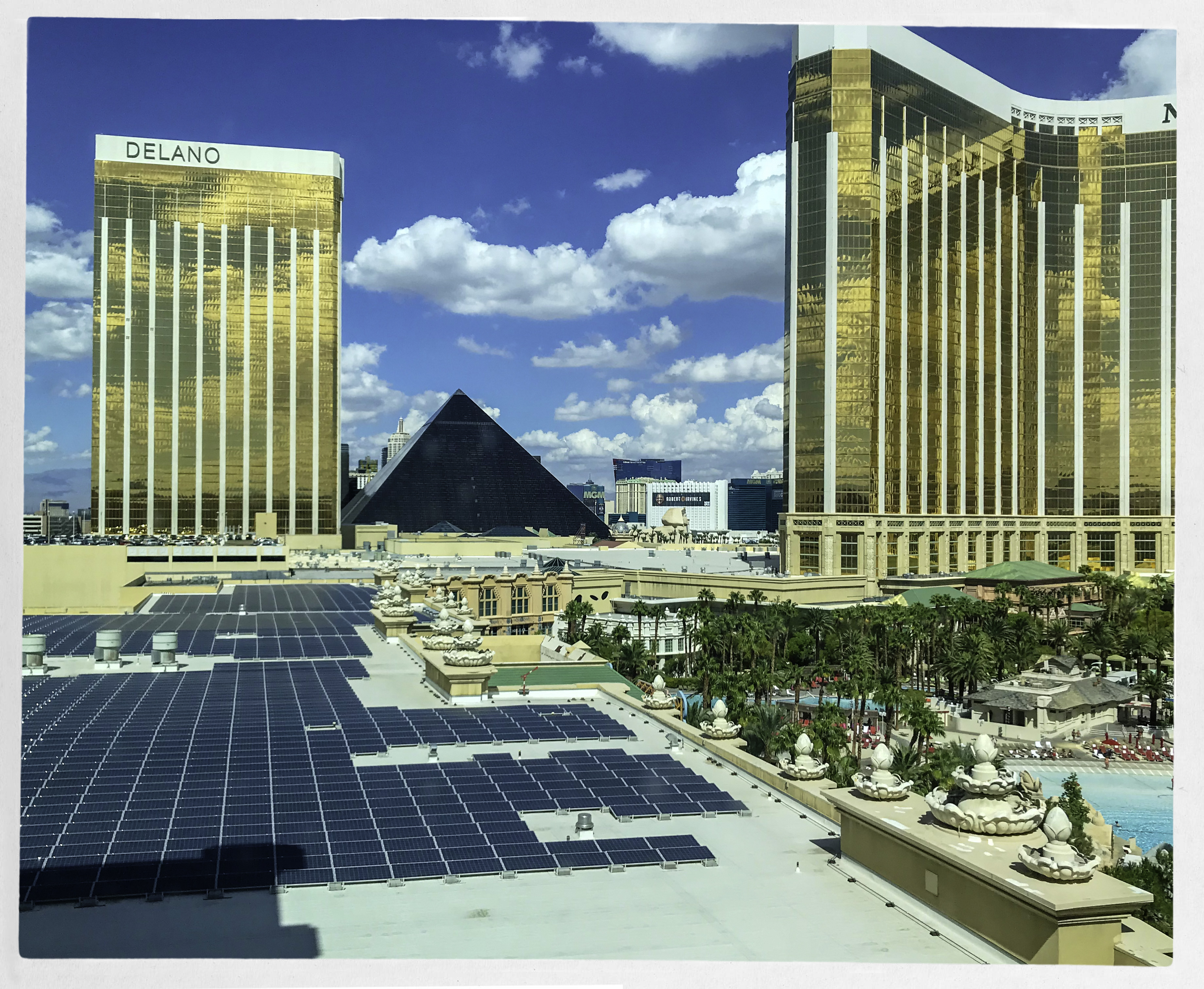
The lower left of the photo shows a portion of the solar array on top of the Mandalay Bay Convention Center.

Many hotel resort properties have sustainability efforts, including:

- Water conservation: Approaches include reclaiming water and placing it back into Lake Mead, using minimal outdoor landscaping, upgrading toilets, using low-flow showerheads, and setting goals for water conservation.
- Recycling: In 2017, the recycling rate in Clark County was about 20%, while the recycling rate for major hotels on the Strip was about 40%.
- Food handling: Leftover food is composted or sent to agricultural farms. Untouched, undisturbed food is donated to local food banks.
- Energy efficiency: Hotels have updated appliances in rooms, installed LED lighting, and installed wireless lighting control systems.

Renewable energy is generated and used on the Strip. MGM built a solar array atop the Mandalay Bay in 2014 and expanded it in 2016. Part of a 28-acre system, it is one of the largest commercial rooftop solar arrays in the United States. The solar array's 26,000-plus solar panels that can provide a total of 8.3 megawatts DC (6.5 megawatts AC), enough for 1,300 homes or about one-quarter of the Mandalay Bay campus.

The Strip has one of the highest concentrations of LEED-certified buildings in the world, including the Octavius Tower at Caesars Palace and the Linq Promenade, both certified LEED Silver.

== Locations of major landmarks ==
=== Current landmarks ===
North towards Fremont Street

↑

Strat
Las Vegas Boulevard
Aztec Inn
Ahern
Allure
Bonanza Gift Shop
Sahara Avenue
Sahara Avenue
Festival Grounds
Sahara
Hilton Grand Vacations
LVXP Las Vegas (planned)
Sky
Fontainebleau, Turnberry Place, Westgate
Circus Circus
Slots-A-Fun
Peppermill, Convention Center
Resorts World
Guardian Angel Cathedral
Desert Inn Road
Desert Inn Road
Trump
Encore
Fashion Show Mall
Wynn
Spring Mountain Road
Sands Avenue
Treasure Island
Palazzo, Venetian Expo

Venetian, Sphere
Hard Rock (construction)
Casino Royale

Harrah's, Caesars Forum

Linq, High Roller

Flamingo
Caesars Palace
Vanderpump, Westin
Flamingo Road
Flamingo Road
Bellagio
Horseshoe

Paris

Planet Hollywood
Cosmopolitan
Harmon Corner, Elara
Harmon Avenue
Harmon Avenue
CityCenter
BLVD, Grand Chateau, Signature, Topgolf

Park MGM
Showcase Mall
T-Mobile Arena, New York-New York
MGM Grand
Tropicana Avenue
Tropicana Avenue
Excalibur
Oyo, Las Vegas Stadium (construction), Bally's (planned)
Luxor

W, Mandalay Bay
Skyvue (abandoned)
Russell Road
Astral (planned)

Little Church of the West

Pinball Hall of Fame

Dream (on hold)
↓

Welcome to Fabulous Las Vegas sign

South towards Interstate 215

== Demolished or closed Strip casinos and hotels ==
=== Former hotel/casino locations ===
North towards Fremont Street

↑

Vegas World/Million Dollar Casino
Las Vegas Boulevard
Jackpot Casino/Money Tree Casino
Holy Cow/Foxy's Firehouse
Sahara Avenue
Sahara Avenue
El Rancho Vegas
Club Bingo/SLS

Wet 'n Wild

Thunderbird/Silverbird/El Rancho, Algiers Hotel

Riviera
Westward Ho
La Concha Motel

Silver City/Riata
Stardust/Royal Nevada

Desert Inn Road
Desert Inn Road
Silver Slipper/Golden Slipper

New Frontier/Last Frontier/Frontier
Desert Inn
Spring Mountain Road
Sands Avenue

Sands
Mirage/Castaways
Nob Hill Casino

Holiday Casino, Holiday Inn

Flamingo Capri/Imperial Palace/Quad

O'Sheas Casino

Barbary Coast/Bill's/Cromwell
Flamingo Road
Flamingo Road
Dunes
MGM Grand/Bally's

Aladdin/Tallyho/King's Crown
Boardwalk/Mandarin Oriental
Monte Carlo
Harmon Avenue

Marina
Tropicana Avenue
Tropicana Avenue

Tropicana

Las Vegas Village
Hacienda

Russell Road
Glass Pool Inn

Klondike/Kona Kai
↓

South towards Interstate 215

- Aladdin: Opened in 1962 as the Tallyho, became the King's Crown Tallyho in 1963, the Aladdin in 1966, and was demolished in 1998. A new Aladdin resort opened on the property in 2000, and was renamed Planet Hollywood in 2007.
- Big Red's Casino: Opened in 1981 and closed in 1982. Property developed for CBS Sports World Casino in 1997. Changed name to Sports World Casino after CBS threatened to sue. Closed in 2001, now a shopping center.
- Barbary Coast: Opened in 1978-closed in 2007, and became Bill's Gamblin' Hall until 2010. Now The Cromwell.
- Boardwalk Hotel and Casino: Closed on January 9, 2006, demolished May 9, 2006, to make way for CityCenter.
- Castaways: Opened in 1955 as the Sans Souci Hotel and became the Castaways in 1963 and was demolished in 1987. Now The Mirage.
- Desert Inn: Closed on August 28, 2000, demolished in 2001–2004, now Wynn Las Vegas and Encore Las Vegas; Desert Inn golf course was retained and improved.
- Dunes: Closed on January 26, 1993, demolished in 1993–1994, now Bellagio. The Dunes golf course is now occupied by parts of Park MGM, CityCenter, and T-Mobile Arena.
- El Rancho (formerly Thunderbird/Silverbird): Closed in 1992 and demolished in 2000. Now the Fontainebleau Las Vegas.
- El Rancho Vegas: Burned down in 1960. The Hilton Grand Vacations Club timeshare now exists on the south edge of the site where the resort once stood; the remainder is now the Las Vegas Festival Grounds.
- Hacienda: Closed and demolished in December 1996, now Mandalay Bay. Until 2015, a separate Hacienda operated outside Boulder City, formerly the Gold Strike Inn.
- Holy Cow Casino and Brewery: First micro brewery in Las Vegas. Closed in 2002, now a Walgreens store.
- Jackpot Casino: Closed in 1977, now part of Bonanza Gift Shop.
- Klondike Hotel and Casino: Closed in 2006, demolished in 2008.
- Little Caesars Casino: Opened in 1970 and closed in 1994. Paris Las Vegas now occupies the area.
- Money Tree Casino: Closed in 1979, now Bonanza Gift Shop.
- Marina Hotel and Casino: Closed, adapted into MGM Grand, now the West Wing of the MGM Grand.
- Mirage: Closed July 17, 2024, expected to reopen as a Hard Rock resort in 2027.
- New Frontier: Closed July 16, 2007, demolished November 13, 2007.
- Nob Hill Casino: Opened in 1979, and closed in 1990. Now Casino Royale.
- Riviera Hotel and Casino: Opened in 1955; Closed in May 2015 to make way for the Las Vegas Global Business District.
- Royal Nevada: Opened in 1955; became part of the Stardust in 1959.
- Sands Hotel and Casino: Closed on June 30, 1996, demolished in 1996, now The Venetian.
- Silver City Casino: Closed in 1999, now the Silver City Plaza Shopping Center.
- Silver Slipper Casino: Opened in 1950 and closed and demolished in 1988. It became the parking lot for the New Frontier until its closure and demolition in 2007.
- Stardust Resort and Casino: Closed on November 1, 2006, demolished on March 13, 2007, now Resorts World.
- Tropicana Las Vegas: Closed on April 2, 2024, and demolished by implosion on October 9, 2024. Set to be replaced by New Las Vegas Stadium, the future home of the Las Vegas Athletics
- Vegas World: Opened in 1979, and closed in 1995. Now The Strat.
- Westward Ho Hotel and Casino: Closed in 2005, demolished in 2006. Now a McDonald's.

== Gallery ==
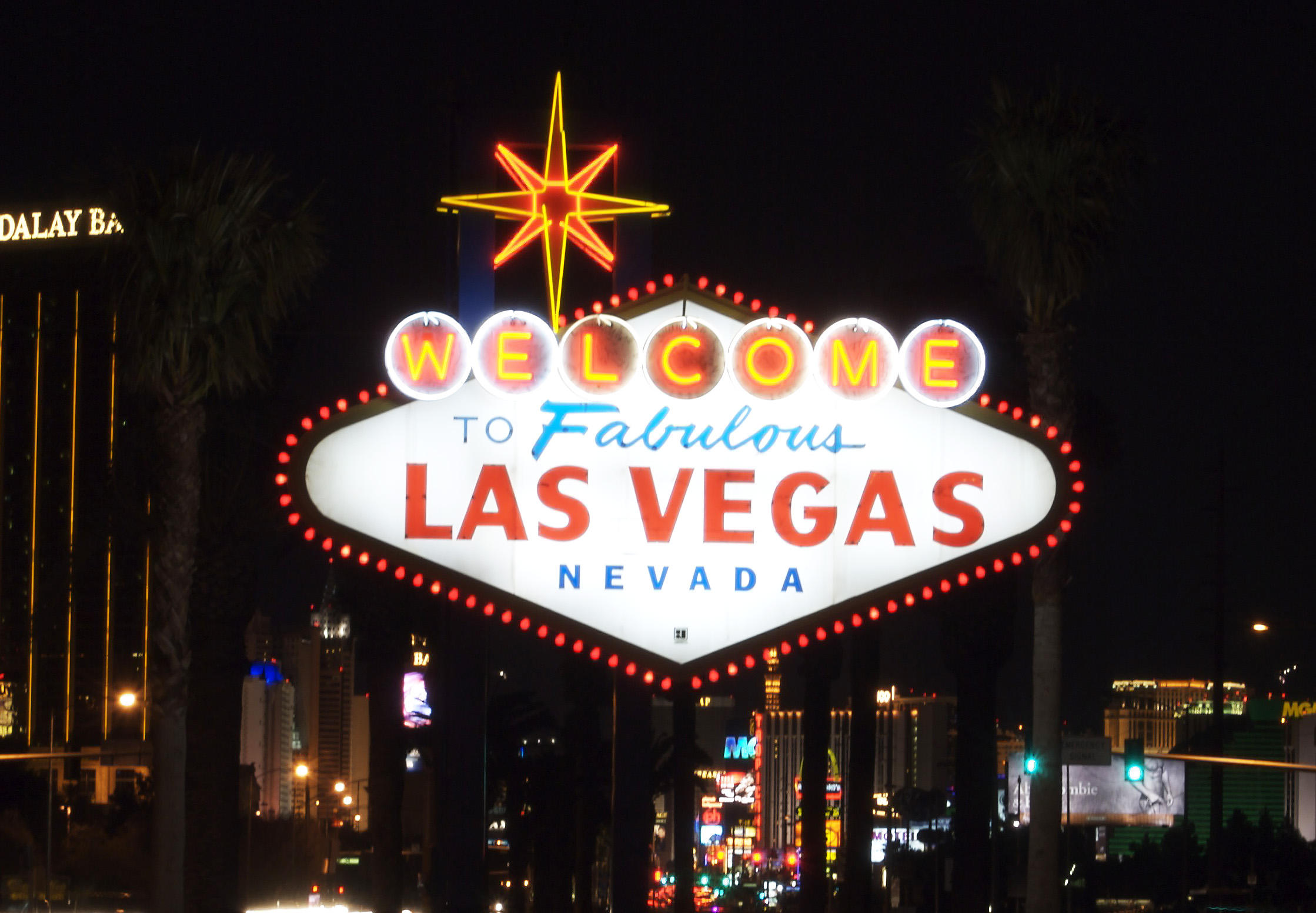
The iconic Welcome to Las Vegas sign was built in 1959.

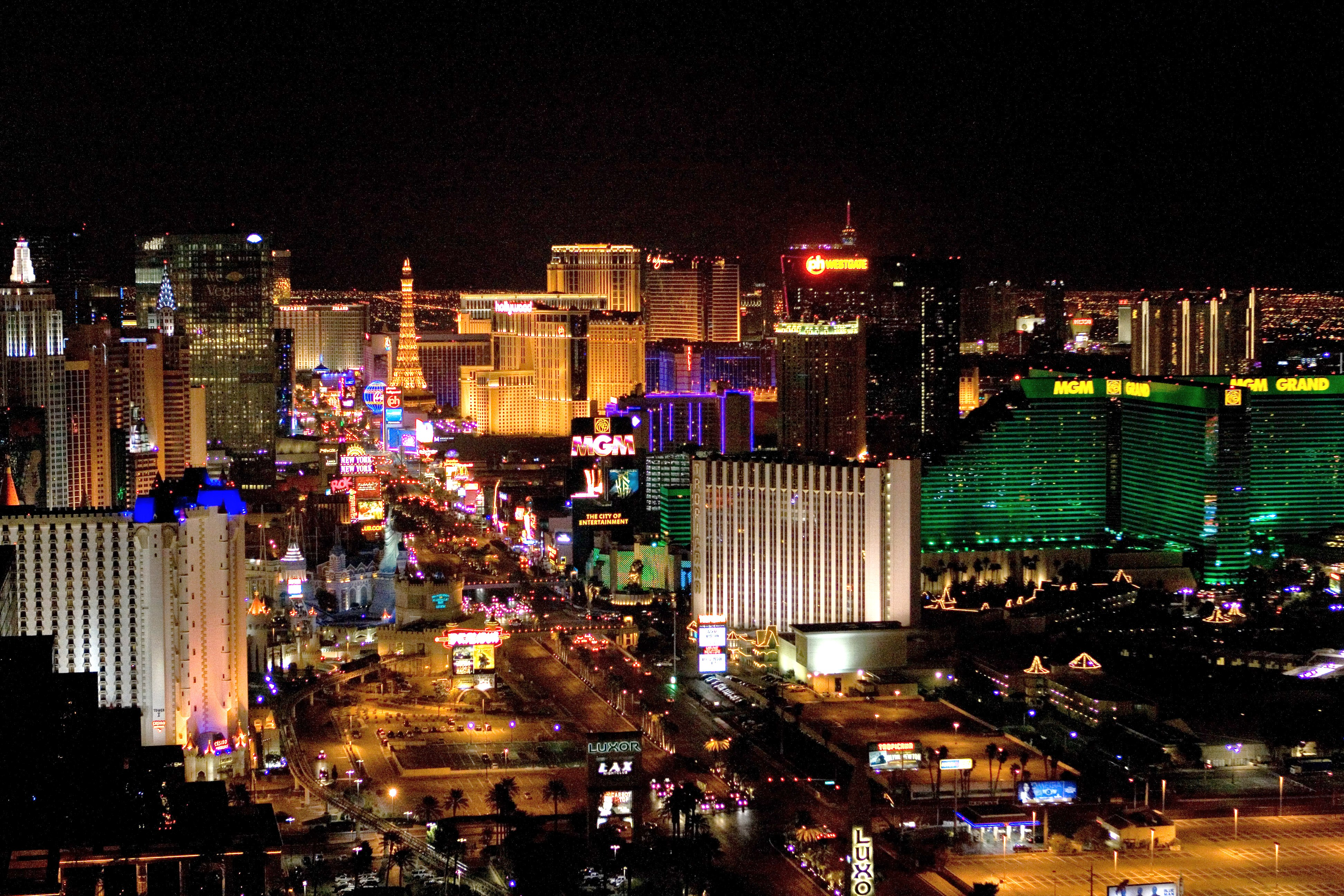
The Strip in 2009

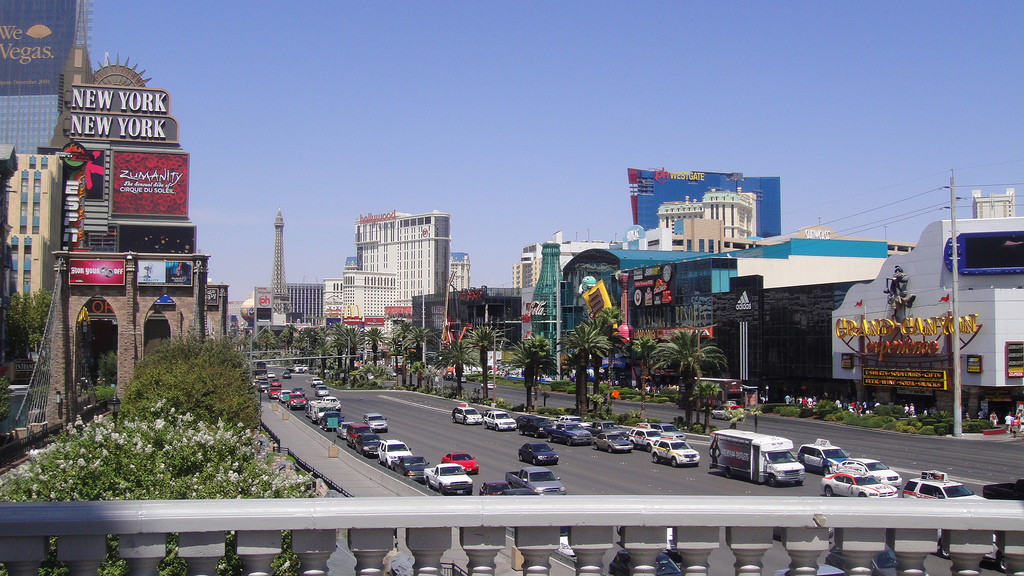
A view of the southern end of the Strip. Looking northward from Tropicana Avenue.

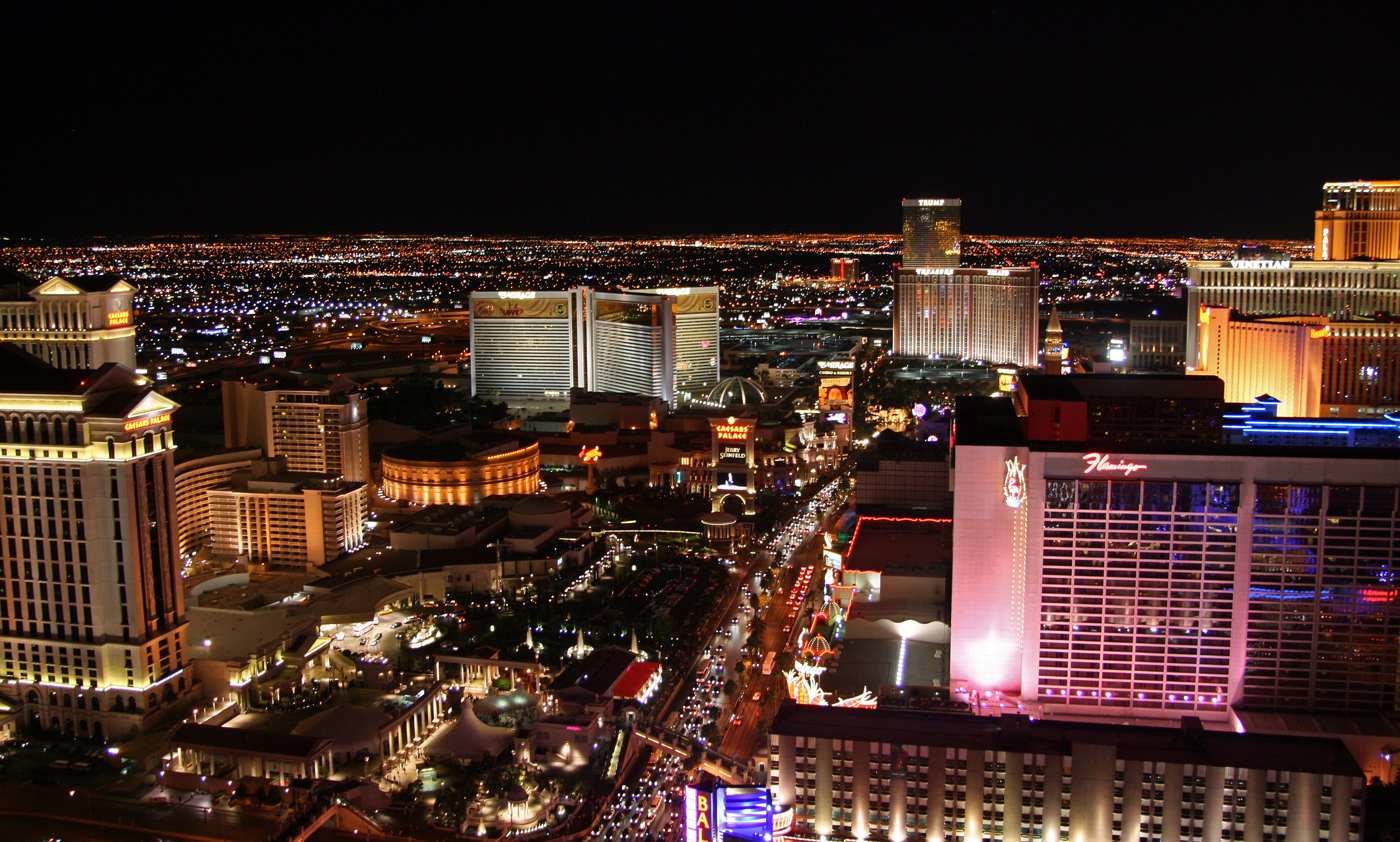
View of the Strip from the Eiffel Tower of the Paris Las Vegas

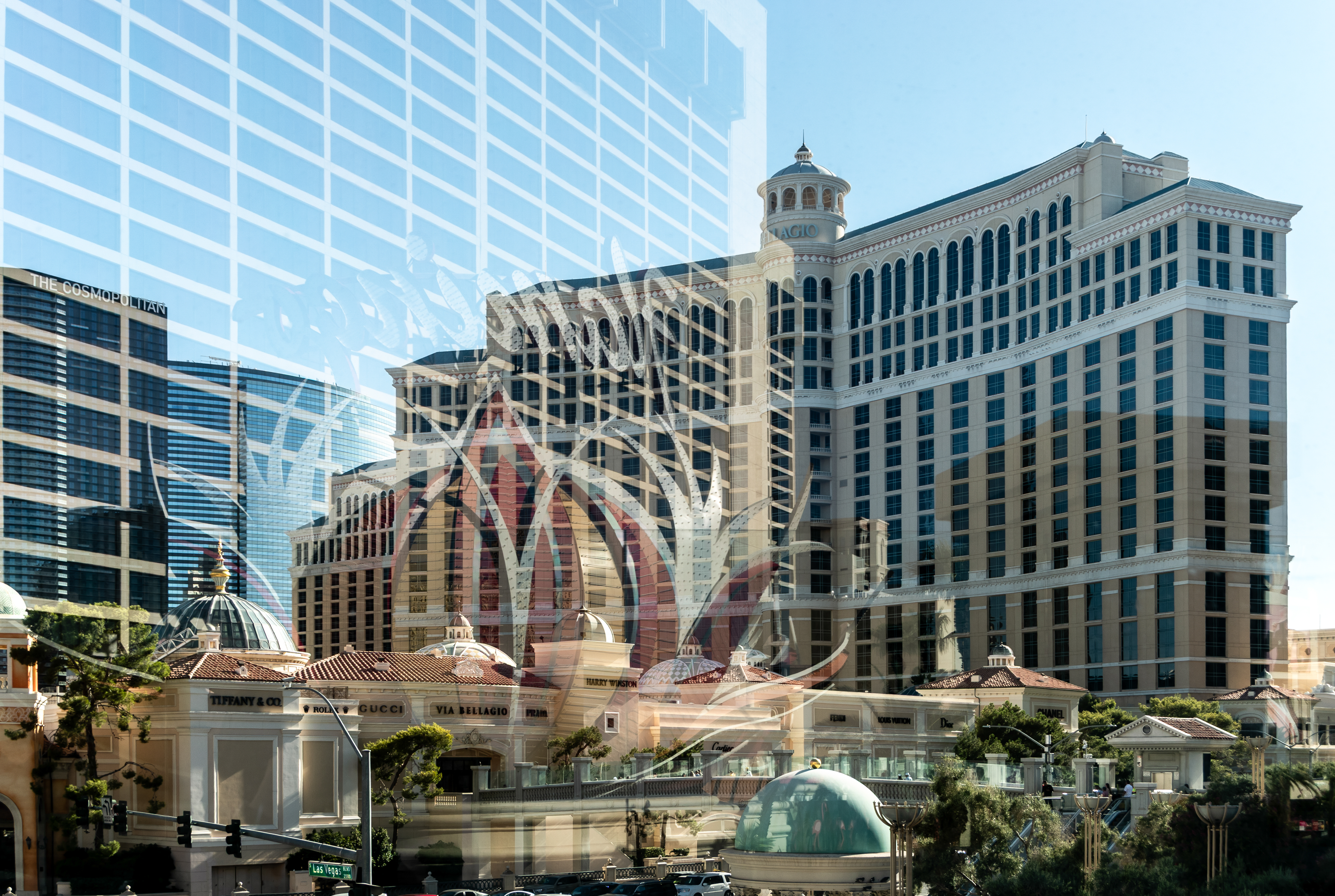
Reflection of Flamingo Las Vegas on a glass overpass in front of the Bellagio and Cosmopolitan

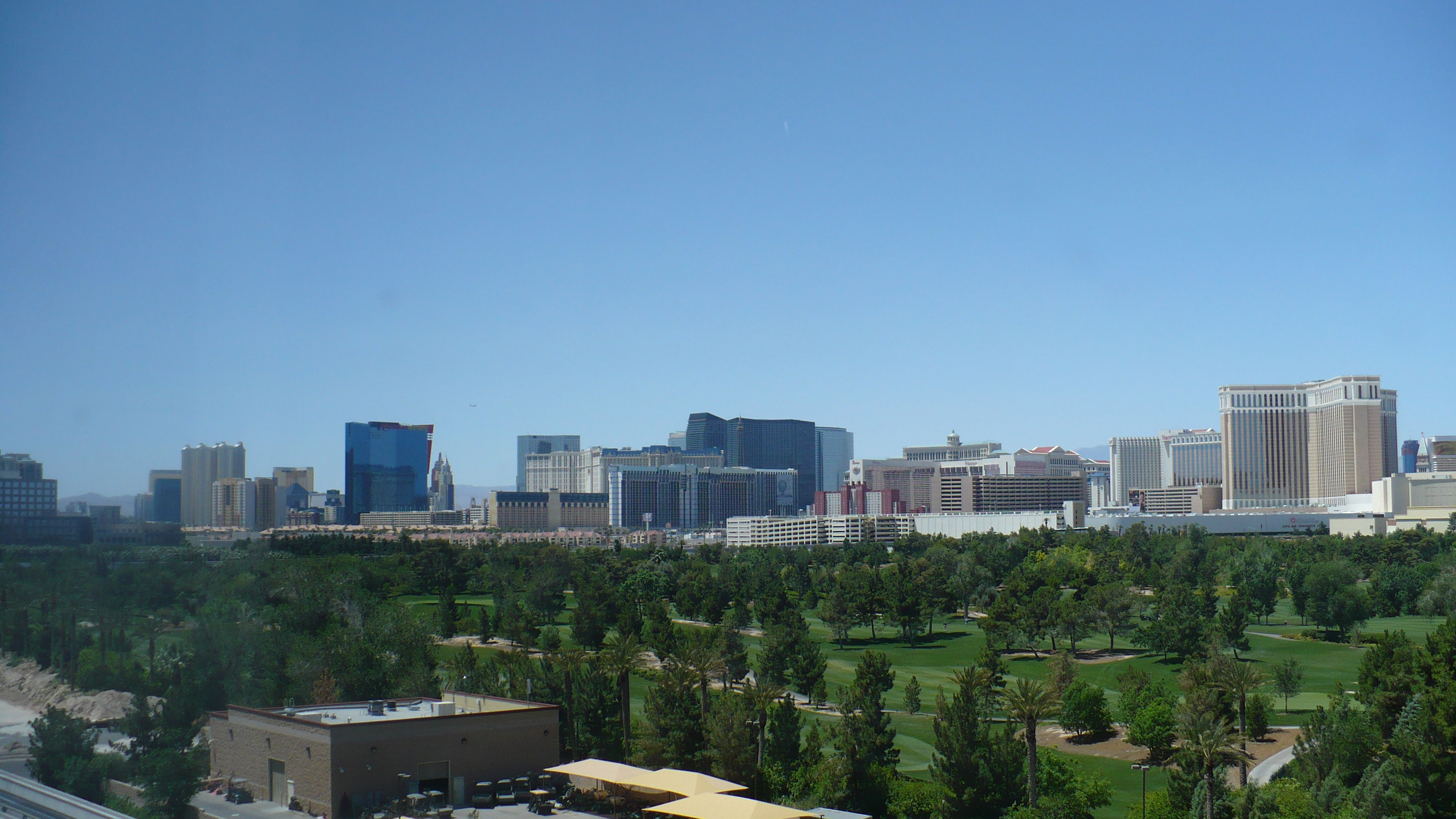
Photo taken May 21, 2010, a view of the Strip from the Renaissance Hotel

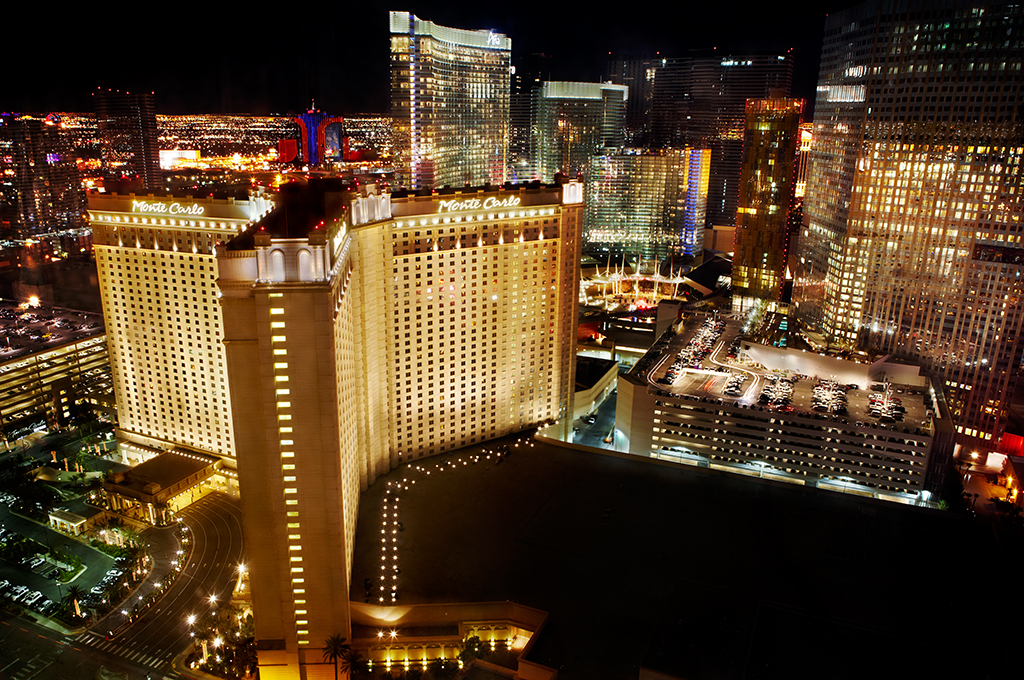
View of Monte Carlo Resort and Casino with CityCenter in the background

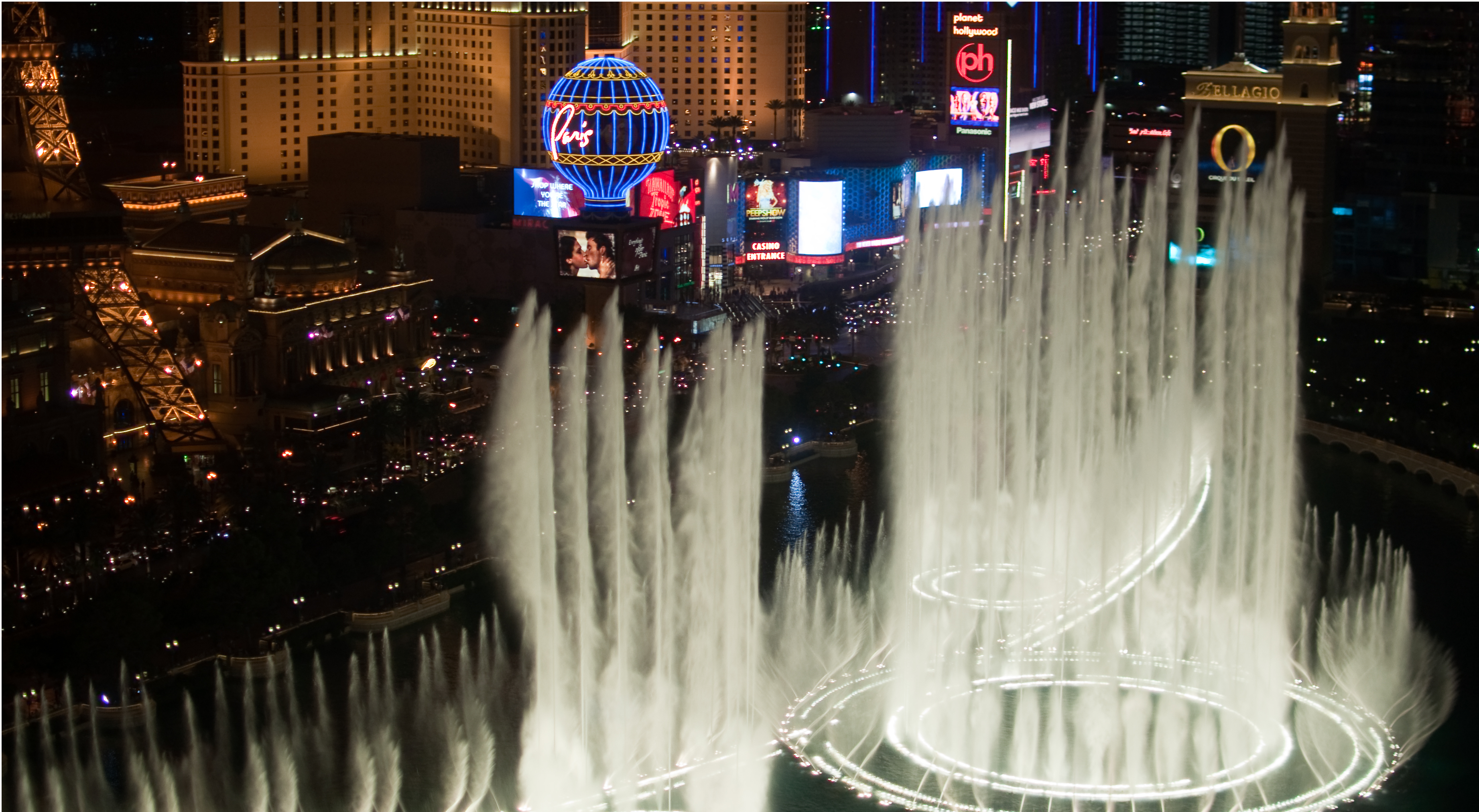
The Bellagio Fountains as seen from the hotel

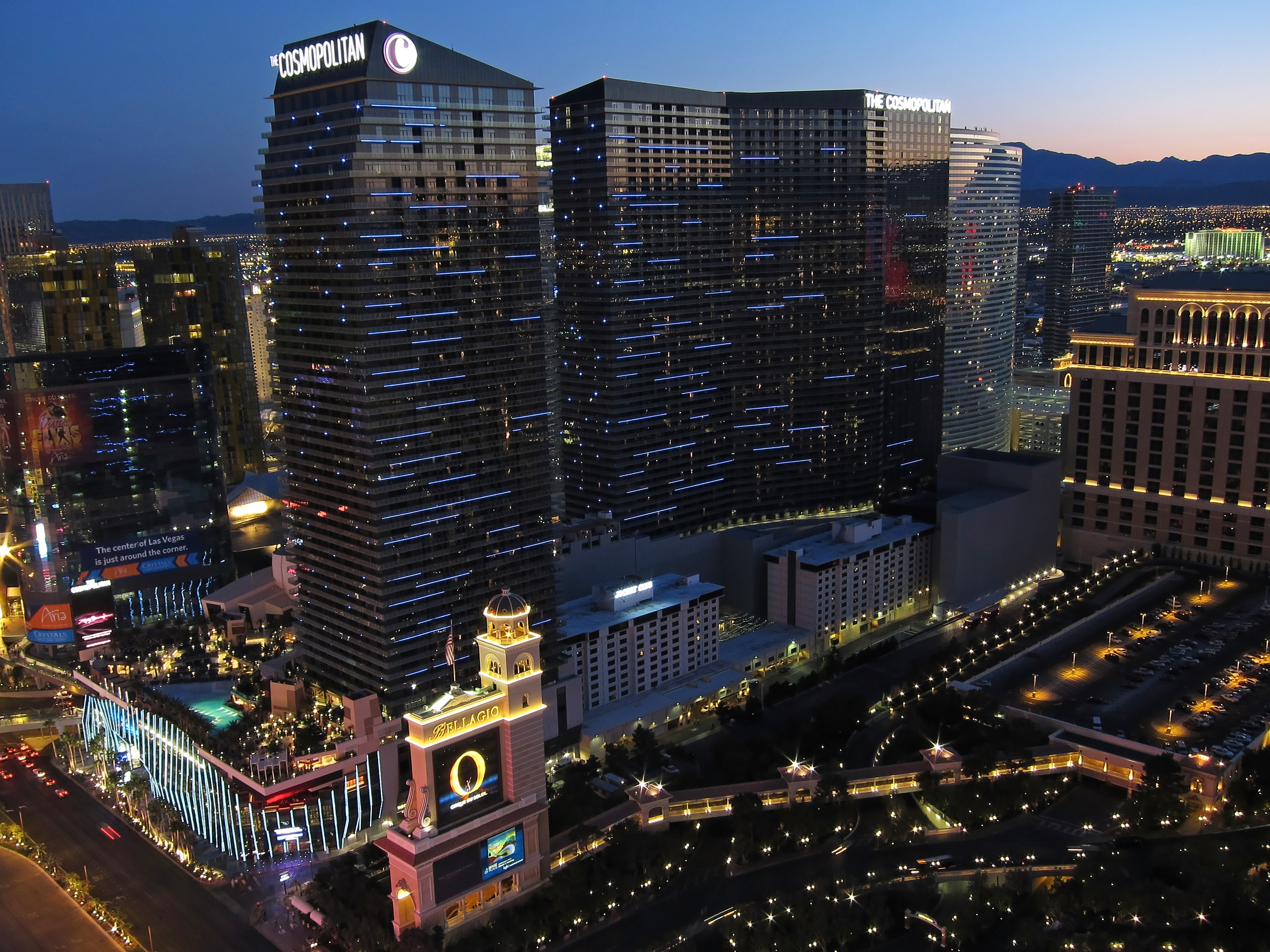
The Cosmopolitan

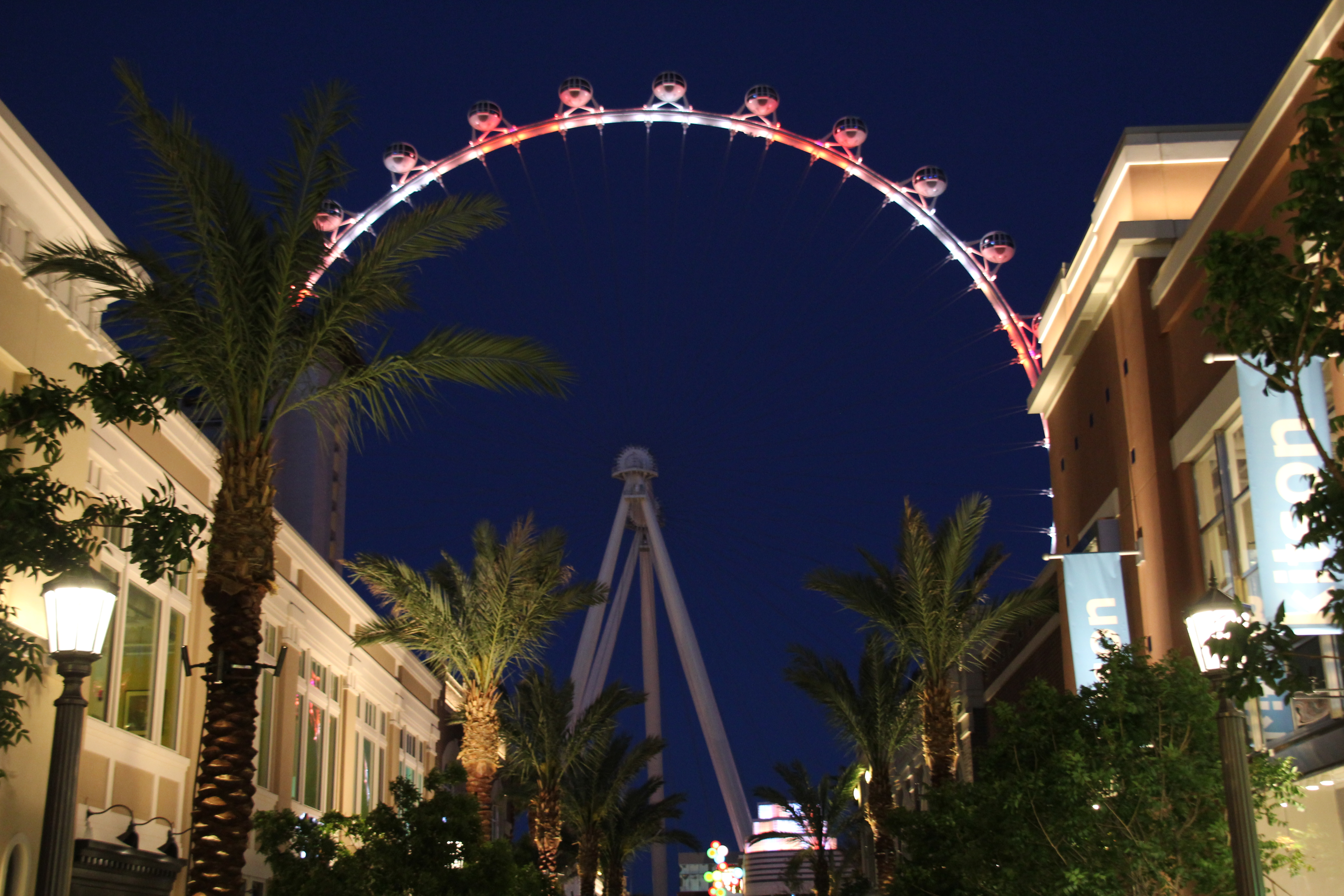
The Las Vegas High Roller is the second tallest Ferris wheel in the world.

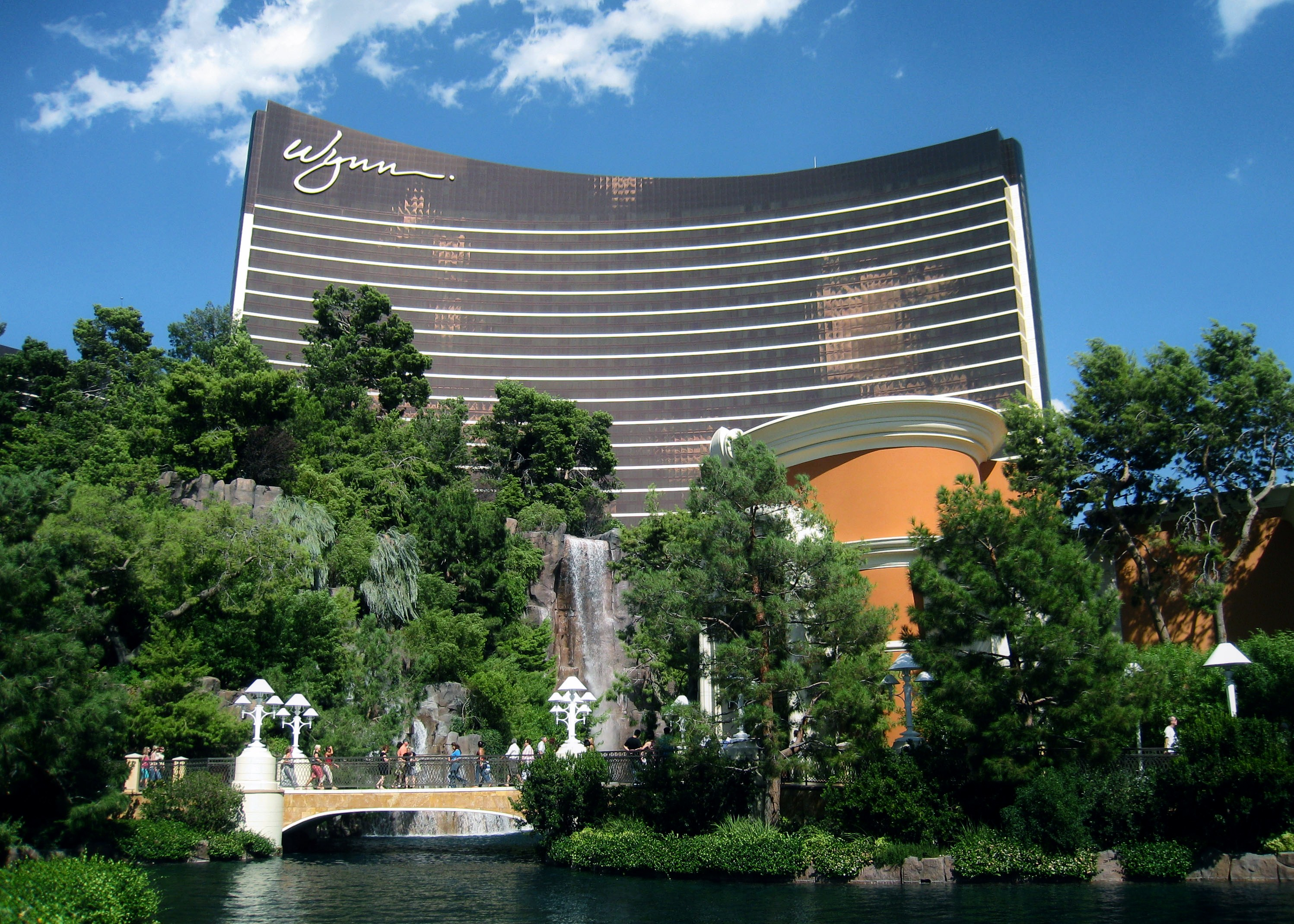
Wynn Las Vegas

Takeoff From Harry Reid International Airport in Las Vegas

== See also ==
- Las Vegas
- Las Vegas Boulevard
- Welcome to Fabulous Las Vegas sign
- Cotai Strip
- List of integrated resorts
