= Wet 'n Wild (Las Vegas) =

Former water park in Las Vegas, Nevada

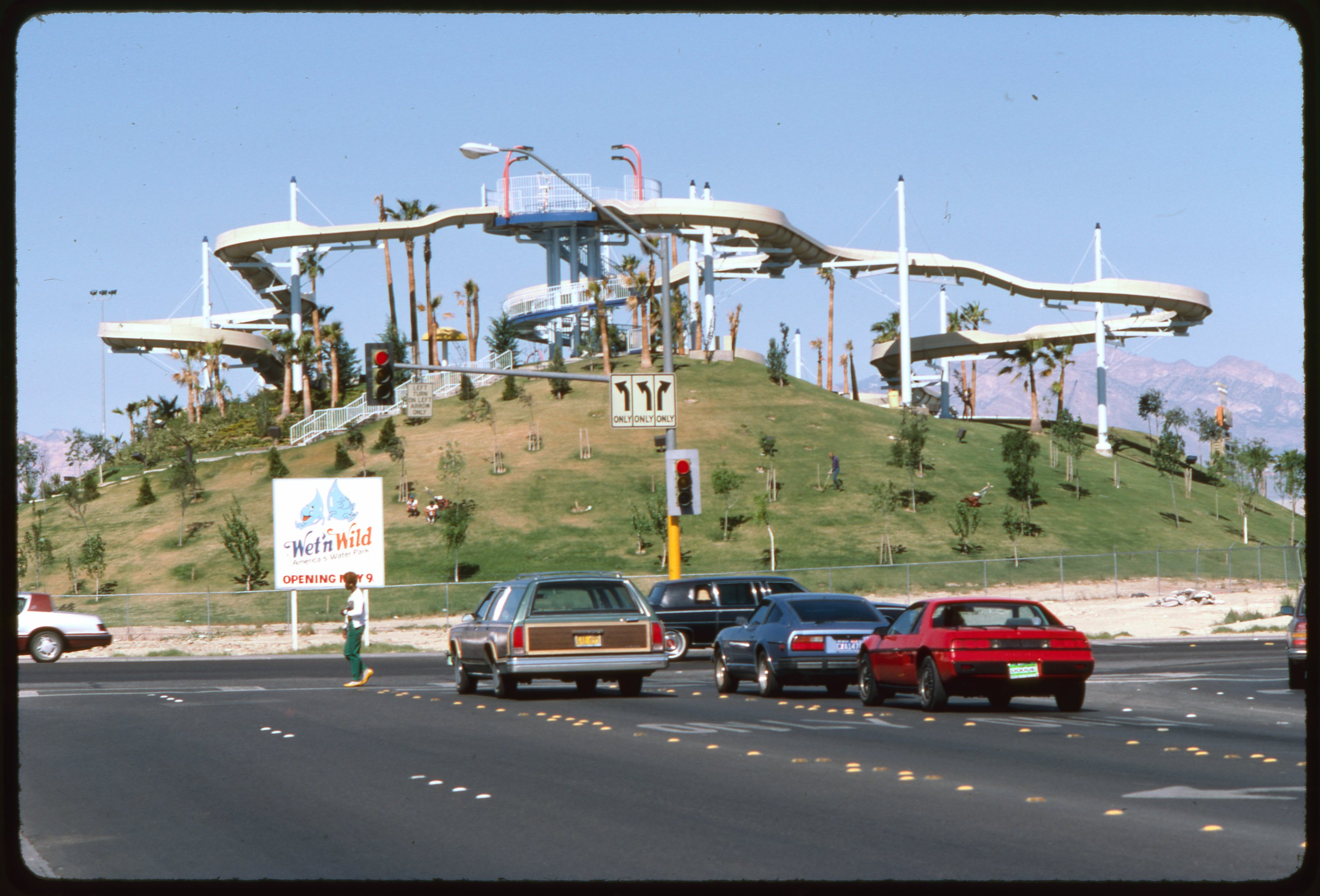
- Wet 'n Wild, as seen from Karen Avenue in 1987
- Interactive map of Wet 'n Wild
- Location: 2601 South Las Vegas Boulevard, Winchester, Nevada, United States
- Coordinates: 36.140361°N 115.158450°W
- Owner: Palace Entertainment
- Operated by: Palace Entertainment
- Opened: May 18, 1985; 41 years ago
- Closed: September 26, 2004; 22 years ago
- Visitors per annum: 500,000
- Area: 27 acres (11 ha)
- Pools: 2 pools
- Water slides: 10 water slides
- Children's areas: A single children's area
- Website: Official website (archived)

Wet 'n Wild was a 27-acre (11 ha) water park located at 2601 South Las Vegas Boulevard on the Las Vegas Strip in Winchester, Nevada. The $14 million water park opened on May 18, 1985, as a joint venture between Howard Hughes Development Corporation and Wet 'n Wild. A number of ownership changes occurred beginning in 1998. It was eventually sold to Palace Entertainment in 2002. However, the land itself was leased throughout the water park's history.

In 2003, plans were announced to end the lease in favor of redeveloping the site. Wet 'n Wild closed on September 26, 2004, although several proposed projects for the site have failed to materialize, including a skyscraper resort known as Crown Las Vegas and the All Net Resort & Arena.

== History ==
Wet 'n Wild was announced in June 1984, as a joint venture between Howard Hughes Development Corporation – part of Summa Corporation – and San Diego–based Wet 'n Wild. The Hughes corporation conceived the project because of the potential to expand the local tourism market through family entertainment, and the Las Vegas Convention and Visitors Authority believed that the water park would appeal to families visiting Las Vegas. Hughes chose a water park theme as the company did not want to compete against southern California's Disneyland and Knott's Berry Farm theme parks, as many Las Vegas tourists were residents of southern California. The concept of a water park in Las Vegas was also considered ideal because of the city's dry and hot weather. Construction on the 27-acre park was underway by October 1984. It was built on the Las Vegas Strip, between the Sahara and El Rancho hotel-casinos.

Wet 'n Wild opened on May 18, 1985, after $14 million was spent on construction. The park included three turbine engines capable of creating rolling four-foot waves in a 170-foot pool. The park also featured a 17,000-square-foot surf lagoon containing 500,000 gallons of water, ranging in depth from eight feet to two inches. The surf lagoon was a main attraction, as well as a 76-foot-high water slide known as the Der Stuka, located along Las Vegas Boulevard on the property's west end, south of the Sahara. A capsule known as the Bomb Bay was eventually added atop the Der Stuka. The Bomb Bay required people to push a button, which opened the floor beneath them, plummeting riders to the slide approximately 20 feet below.

Wet 'n Wild was the latest Las Vegas effort to appeal to visiting families. The park proved to be successful in its early months. Approximately 500,000 people were expected to visit the water park during its first year. By June 1986, park attendance had increased 19.7 percent from the previous year. In 1992, Wet 'n Wild added the Black Hole, an enclosed water tube ride with a space age theme.

In 1993, the park was sued by Russell Beatty, a man who suffered temporary paralysis after his neck was broken in three areas. Beatty had been waiting for his son at the bottom of the Hydro Blaster water slide and was struck by a 275-pound man. Beatty alleged that lifeguards allowed the man to go down the slide too soon, resulting in the injury.

In the mid-1990s, the park began offering its Summer Nights celebration, which featured live music, as well as contests and games. In 1995, security measures were taken after someone in the parking lot had videotaped young girls in bathing suits and began selling the footage. More than 100 trees were planted to obscure the view to outsiders, and a canvas screen was placed over a chain-link fence that separated the parking lot from the water park.

In 1995, Bill Bennett purchased the Sahara resort from Santa Fe Gaming, and it was initially believed that the sale included Wet 'n Wild. This led to persistent rumors that the park would close and be demolished to make way for a Sahara parking lot. However, Bennett's purchase did not include the park, which had a lease with Santa Fe Gaming through 2004. To help combat the closure rumors, the park announced that it would build a new attraction, the Royal Flush.

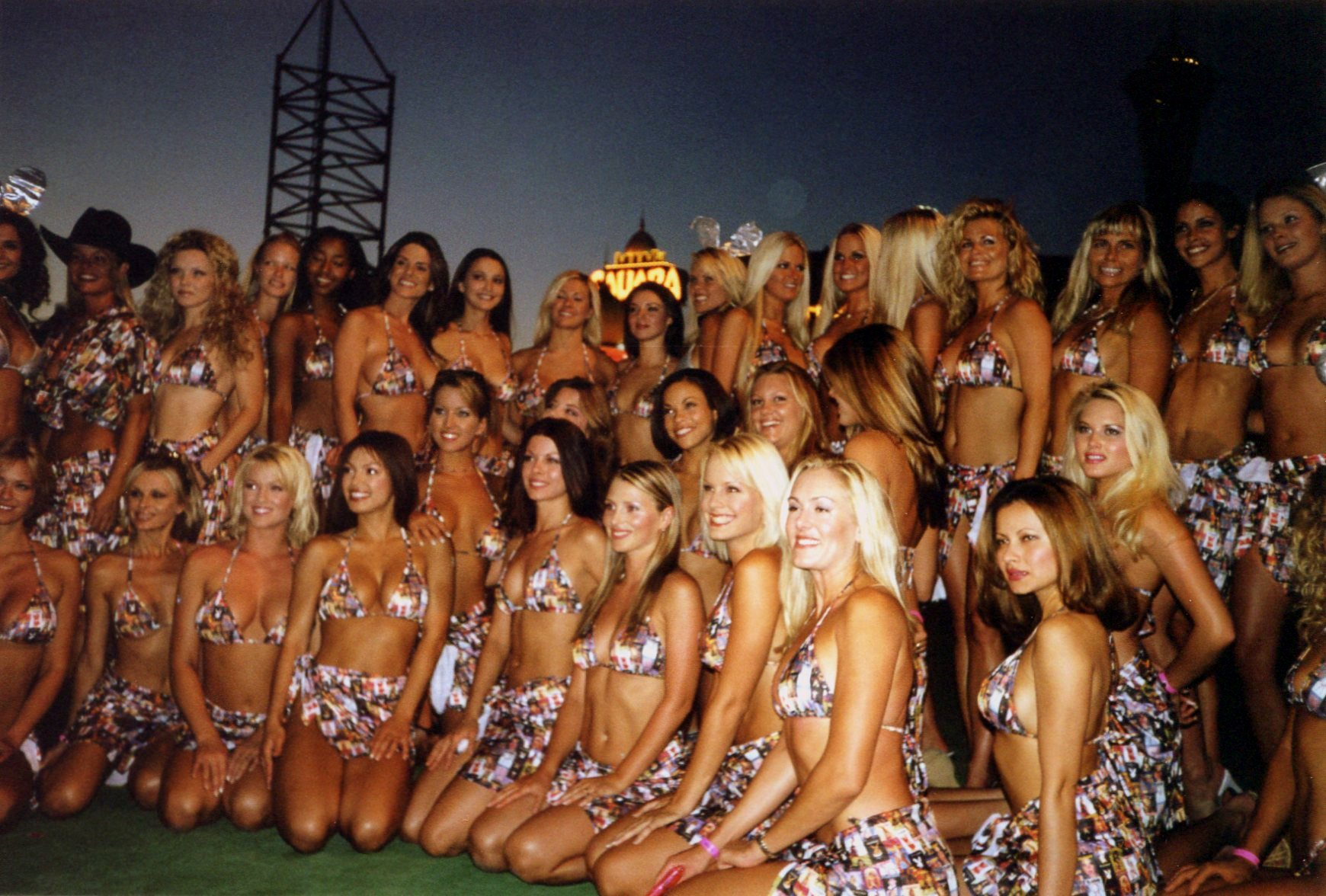
Playboy event held at the park in 2000

In 1997, a nine-year-old girl nearly drowned in a wave pool at the park before being rescued by lifeguards. The park had never experienced a fatality or near-drowning up to that point. The girl was hospitalized at Sunrise Hospital & Medical Center where she was declared brain-dead and put on life support before dying a week later. Some bystanders criticized the lifeguards' actions and considered them to be incompetent. However, the Las Vegas Metropolitan Police Department found no wrongdoing.

The Royal Flush eventually opened in 1998. It consisted of a water slide leading into one of two bowls: one open and one enclosed. Riders would go down the slide and around one of the bowls at up to 45 miles per hour. It was the park's first new attraction in seven years.

In October 1998, Universal Studios Recreation Group acquired the park as part of its purchase of the Wet 'n Wild brand. Ogden Corporation purchased the park in early 1999, and announced plans later that year to sell it. The park was purchased by Alfa Smartparks in 2000.

In 2000, the park hosted a Playboy home video release party and fashion show. The event included 40 Playmates, the most ever assembled for a single event. As of 2002, Wet 'n Wild was considered by Clark County to have one of the best maintained pools in the Las Vegas Valley.

Palace Entertainment purchased the park in July 2002.

=== Closure ===
In February 2003, the Clark County Commission approved plans for a 50-story hotel and timeshare resort to be built on the Wet 'n Wild site. The project would also include a casino, a Ferris wheel, and a man-made lake. It was proposed by a partnership that included Paul Lowden, who owned the land through his company Archon Corporation (formerly Santa Fe Gaming). Lowden's partner, Voyager Entertainment, later dropped out of the plans, and a new 10-year lease was signed for Wet 'n Wild in May 2003. However, by the end of the year, Lowden ended the lease and was planning to proceed with his new resort, which would be named Palace of the Sea.

In the meantime leading up to construction, Wet 'n Wild would reopen for the 2004 season. Because of uncertainty regarding Archon's construction schedule, the park added a new attraction. Dragon's Den, an $800,000 water slide, was unveiled in May 2004. It featured a nine-foot mist-breathing dragon, and was the first new attraction to open since the Royal Flush. It was built by ProSlide.

In August 2004, the park announced that it would permanently close the following month for Archon's redevelopment plans. At the time, approximately 80 percent of the park's clientele were locals. The park had an annual attendance of about 500,000, dating back to 1997, and had been popular among celebrities. The park closed on September 26, 2004. Most of the rides were to be relocated to other water parks owned by Palace Entertainment. Dismantling of the park was underway in early 2005. Meanwhile, Archon was unsure whether to proceed with its resort plan or to sell the property. Some parts of the water park remained into 2006, and were vandalized with graffiti.

=== Redevelopment proposals ===
In mid-2006, Archon agreed to sell the property for $450 million to Christopher Milam, a developer. Milam, along with Publishing and Broadcasting Limited, planned to build a $5 billion skyscraper resort known as Crown Las Vegas. The project was canceled in 2008, before the start of construction. In 2010, Milam announced plans to redevelop the site as the $750 million Silver State Arena. Nearby residents opposed construction, and the project stalled further when Clark County rejected a proposal to fund 15% of the venue with public money.

Jackie Robinson, a businessman and former NBA player, announced new plans for the site. His $1.4 billion project, the All Net Resort, would include a hotel and an arena that could attract an NBA franchise to Las Vegas. The start of construction was delayed numerous times, due to financing issues, and the project was canceled in 2023.

LVXP, a local real estate development company, announced plans in 2024 to build a casino resort on the land. It would also be accompanied by an NBA arena. The unnamed project would include 2,605 hotel and condominium units across three towers; one of these, at 752 feet, would be the tallest building in the state. The resort was designed by Steelman Partners, while AECOM handled the arena design. The project is approved by the county, and construction would begin in 2025 and conclude in 2029.
