= All Net Resort & Arena =

Cancelled entertainment complex in Las Vegas, Nevada, United States

- Interactive map of All Net Resort & Arena
- Location: Winchester, Nevada
- Coordinates: 36.140898°N 115.158320°W
- Owner: Jackie Robinson
- Operator: Comcast Spectacor
- Capacity: 23,000

Construction
- Groundbreaking: October 29, 2014
- Cost: $4.9 billion
- Architect: Cuningham Group

Website
- Official website

All Net Resort & Arena is a cancelled entertainment complex in Las Vegas, Nevada, United States. A project of businessman and former basketball player Jackie Robinson, the complex would have included a resort hotel, retail and restaurant space, and a multi-purpose arena with a retractable roof. Its location was set on the Las Vegas Strip at the former site of a Wet 'n Wild waterpark, next to the Sahara Las Vegas in Winchester, Nevada.

Robinson announced the project in December 2013. Designed by the Cuningham Group, it was initially planned to open in December 2016, at a cost of $1.3 billion. However, the project cost increased several times, and the start of construction was delayed repeatedly because of difficulty acquiring construction funds.

Over the years, All Net received numerous extensions from the Clark County Commission, which voted against another extension in November 2023, putting an end to the project.

== History ==
=== Background ===
All Net Resort & Arena was proposed for 27 acres (11 ha) on the north Las Vegas Strip, located between the Sahara resort to the north and the Fontainebleau resort to the south. The property had previously been the site of the Wet 'n Wild water park, which closed in 2004 for redevelopment. Several projects were proposed for the site over a number of years. Paul Lowden, the owner of the property, had wanted to open a resort known as Palace of the Sea. The project was never built, and Lowden's company, Archon Corporation, agreed to sell the land to Texas developer Christopher Milam in 2006. Milam planned to construct a skyscraper resort on the site known as Crown Las Vegas, but this project was also canceled.

In early 2010, Milam proposed building the Silver State Arena on the former Wet 'n Wild land, which was still owned by Paul and Sue Lowden. The arena would include seating for up to 22,000 people, and Milam sought public funding from Clark County to help finance the project, with a potential opening in 2012. The project would be built by Milam's International Development Management, and would be 85-percent privately financed. It was one of several arenas proposed for the Las Vegas Valley.

Silver State Arena faced opposition from the Clark County Commission, which was hesitant to help fund the project amid financial struggles. To win the support of the commission, Milam sought to attract NBA and NHL teams to the arena. Some nearby residents opposed the project, over concerns about noise, pollution, and increased traffic. MGM Mirage also opposed the project. Milam later proposed an arena for other locations in the Las Vegas Valley, but the project remains unbuilt.

=== All Net Resort & Arena ===
On December 23, 2013, businessman Jackie Robinson, a former UNLV student and NBA player, announced plans to build his own sports arena on the former Wet 'n Wild property. The project was tentatively known as All Net Arena & Resort, and he planned to pursue a naming rights deal eventually. The four-level arena would measure 863,000 sq ft (80,200 m^{2}), and include seating for 22,800 people. The project would also include a 300,000 sq ft (28,000 m^{2}) promenade known as Victory Plaza. Other features would include a 500-suite non-gaming boutique hotel, a restaurant, a nightclub, retail space, a spa, and a wedding chapel. The arena would include a retractable roof, which would allow for a range of indoor and outdoor events. The roof was intended as a main feature for the project. Robinson hoped to attract an NBA team to play at the arena.

The project received a number of skeptics who believed that it would never materialize. Robinson had an option to purchase the property from the Lowdens, or lease it over a 50-year period. He expected to break ground by mid-2014, with the opening scheduled for December 2016. The resort would cost $1.3 billion, including $690 million for the arena. Robinson had funding from a variety of sources, including several banks and the EB-5 program. He had begun planning the project four or five years earlier, but the Great Recession halted his plans. Cuningham Group Architecture was hired to design the project, with the company's Brett Ewing as architect. Comcast Spectacor was chosen to operate the arena.

In August 2014, the Clark County Commission unanimously approved a zoning change that would allow the All Net Resort & Arena to be built, despite opposition from residents of the adjacent Turnberry Place complex. The project was approved to include a 44-story hotel with 500 rooms, and a 16-screen movie theater was added to the plans. At the time, Robinson was working with the Minority Business Development Agency to recruit investors. He hoped to raise $300 million through the EB-5 program.

A groundbreaking ceremony was held for the $1.4 billion project on October 29, 2014. Five months later, Robinson had yet to reach a development agreement with Clark County, which was needed for his lenders to provide financing for the start of construction. He had already received a permit to remove asphalt from the site, and he planned to eventually excavate 50 feet into the ground for parking spaces. He hoped to begin construction later in 2015, with an opening by late 2017. Demolition began on the property shortly thereafter, and Robinson hoped to get the arena finished by 2019.

Legal problems involving a financial partner further delayed the start of construction. SL Hare Capital sued Robinson in 2015, alleging that his group made false statements to gain financing. This led to a countersuit by Robinson's group, alleging that SL Hare had falsely claimed to have secured $300 million for the project. The case was eventually dismissed in January 2017. Two months later, earth moving equipment and dirt haulers were working the site, preparing it for underground parking and utilities. Robinson expected to open the project in December 2019.

In mid-2017, Robinson had a second, 63-story hotel tower added to the plans. It would include 2,000 rooms. The expansion would help ensure the project's success upon opening. He announced shortly thereafter that the project had gained full independent financing. The county approved Robinson's expanded plans in October 2017. The project cost had increased to $2.7 billion, with Credit Suisse as the primary lender. Turnberry Place residents were satisfied with the revised project and the retail space that it would bring. Robinson now expected to begin work on the site by the end of 2017, with completion by mid-2020. The excavation process was expected to take up to eight months. The site consisted of an excavated hole for the next several years while the start of construction faced numerous delays.

In June 2019, Robinson said the project was fully financed and that building designs would take approximately 45 days to receive county approval, while construction would take about three years. In August 2019, Robinson said he was in the final stages of getting his loan for the project, which was expected to cost nearly $3 billion. The project would be financed with money from Qatar, Zürich, and central banks in Europe. Moving the money into the U.S. was a lengthy process. Robinson's group had also invested more than $37 million into the project.

In October 2020, the Clark County Commission granted a final six-month extension for the project to finalize agreements with the county. These included a decommissioning plan in the event that construction stops, and a development agreement, both of which were approved in April 2021. Robinson planned to purchase the property from the Lowdens for $400 million. Construction was scheduled to begin in October 2021, with the project now expected to cost $4 billion. However, these plans would be delayed as well, due to a dispute with Robinson's financiers. A new $4.7 billion funding package, financed by Active Capital Holdings, was announced in February 2022. However, Robinson said the announcement was premature. A new investor and funding package was unveiled in October 2022, a few weeks after some work resumed on the site. The project is expected to cost $4.9 billion, and construction was expected to begin by September 2023.

Research was conducted at the site to prepare for future work related to underground parking. The project applied for a grading permit in mid-2023. Robinson hopes to have the project completed by the end of 2026, although this is contingent on the county's approval of the grading permit, which had yet to occur as of October 2023. Robinson said the arena would be beneficial to new resorts along the northern Strip, including Resorts World and Fontainebleau.

The project's land use applications had expired and been extended several times. On November 21, 2023, commissioners denied a fourth extension request, putting an end to the project.

All Net Resort & Arena was expected to include a 44-story and 63-story hotel, a movie theater, a bowling alley, restaurants, and conference space, among other features.

=== Resurrection as LVXP Las Vegas ===
In November 2024, developer LVXP announced to develop a 752-foot-tall resort project, and an arena on the strip. It would include 2,605 hotel rooms and condominium units across three towers and it would be the tallest building in the state. It will be designed by Steelman Partners, and the arena will be designed by AECOM. Clark County Commissioners approved the initial permits in December 2024. Approved by the county, construction could begin by 2025, until completion in 2029.

== See also ==
- T-Mobile Arena, the home of the NHL's Vegas Golden Knights
- Allegiant Stadium, the home of the NFL's Las Vegas Raiders
- New Las Vegas Stadium, the future home of the MLB's Oakland Athletics set to be complete by 2028 when the team relocates to the Las Vegas area
