= MI9 (disambiguation) =

MI-9, MI9, MI 9 may refer to:

- MI9, British Military Intelligence Section 9
- Mi9 (company), an Australian digital media company, fully owned subsidiary of Nine Entertainment Co.
- Mil Mi-9, a variant of the Mil Mi-8 helicopter
- Michigan's 9th congressional district
- M-9 (Michigan highway), a former designation for portions of M-99
- M.I.9, a spy agency in the TV series M.I. High
- Xiaomi Mi 9, an Android phone
