= Nine.com.au =

Australian news and current events website

- Website type: Internet portal
- Owner: Nine
- Creators: Nine Entertainment; Microsoft
- Website: www.nine.com.au
- Commercial: Yes
- Registration: Optional
- Launched: 1997
- Current status: Active

Nine.com.au (formerly Ninemsn) is an Australian news website, owned by Nine Entertainment. It was originally established as a 50:50 joint venture between Microsoft and PBL Media (now Nine Entertainment) in 1997 as "Ninemsn". Microsoft sold its stake in the venture to Nine Entertainment in 2013 and the company was rebranded as Nine Digital in 2016. The website was rebranded to its current name Nine.com.au on 28 June 2016.

Nine.com.au is currently a network of sites including Nine News, Wide World of Sports and 9Honey.

== History ==
The venture was established in 1997, with a combined investment of $50 million, which brought together all the online assets of Microsoft and all the media assets of PBL, which include the Nine Network, Australian Consolidated Press and other PBL assets.

In December 2005, Ninemsn acquired Australian content syndication and mobile publishing leader HWW, that syndicated television, movie, music, restaurant and gig guide listings.

In 2006, Ninemsn purchased 5th Finger Pty Ltd, a leading Australian SMS and mobile marketing service provider.

Ninemsn introduced a new logo and a major redesign in mid-2011, allowing users to customise the site to their own preference.

Microsoft sold its 50% stake of Mi9 to Nine Entertainment in 2013, whereby Mi9 was rebranded to Nine Digital. As part of the arrangement, Microsoft signed a long-term strategic partnership agreement, whereby Mi9 will continue to represent Microsoft's suite of advertising products.

Ninemsn introduced a new look homepage in late 2014. Following the rebranding of its television assets in November 2015, Nine Entertainment rebranded Ninemsn to Nine.com.au on 28 June 2016. Ninemsn's sub-brand sites were also rebranded to incorporate the Nine brand as 9Coach, 9Elsewhere, 9Finance, 9TheFix, 9Homes, 9Honey, 9Kitchen, 9Lifestyle and 9Pickle respectively. However, in November 2016, all sub-brands apart from 9Finance and 9Pickle were reorganised under a revised 9Honey umbrella brand that aimed to target women; 9Style was launched to take the previous role of 9Honey while 9Lifestyle was closed. 9Mums was later launched in March 2017 as a family and parenting brand.
