= HWW =

HWW may refer to:

- HWW Limited, an Australian data management company
- Harzwasserwerke, a German water works and dam operator
- Henry Wise Wood Senior High School, in Calgary, Alberta, Canada
- High wind warning
- Hilton Worldwide, an American hospitality company
- Hinterland Who's Who, a series of Canadian public service announcements
- Holyoke Water Works, a public drinking water utility in Holyoke, Massachusetts
- How Wood railway station, in England
