= Skyvue =

Unfinished giant ferris wheel in Nevada

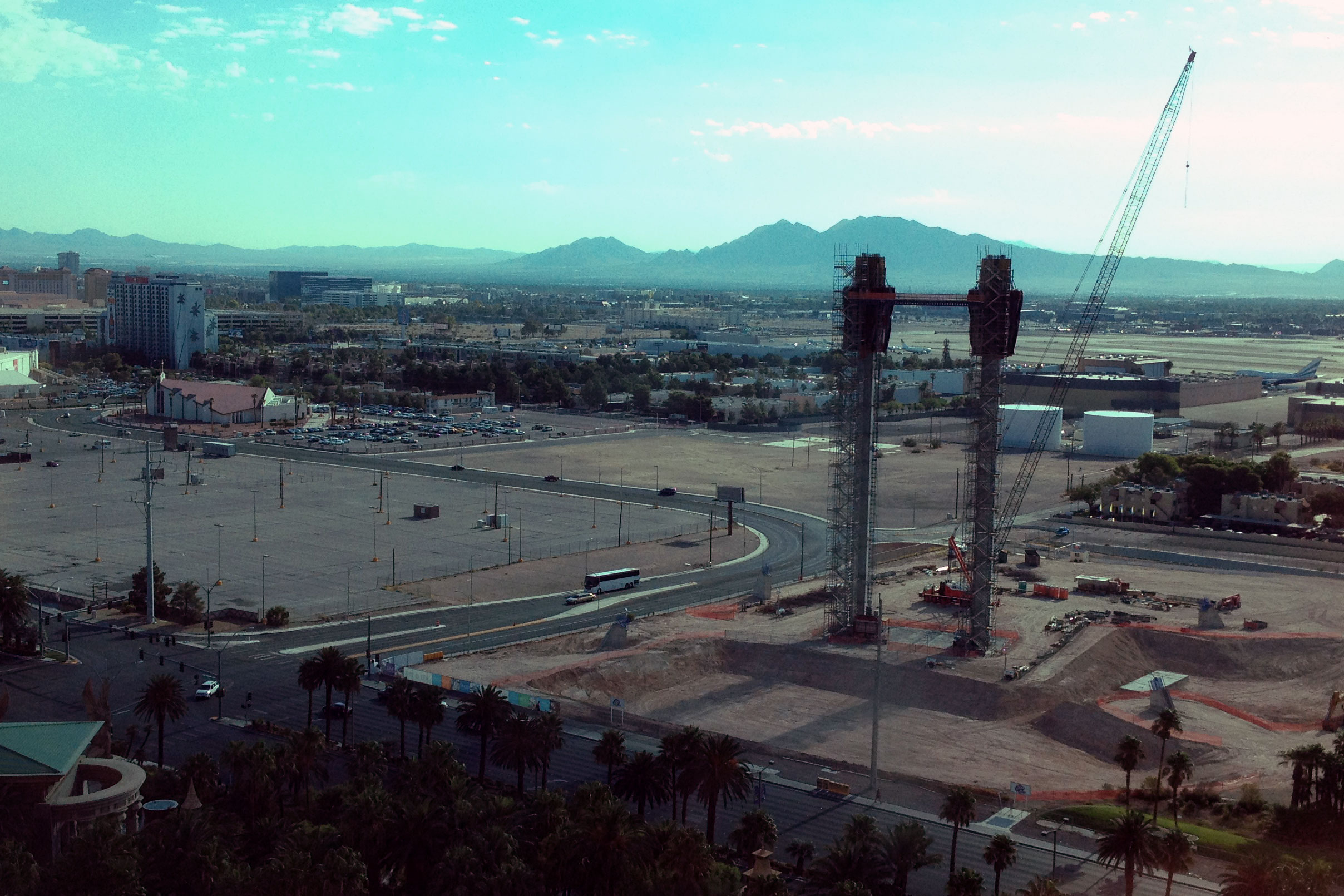
- Skyvue under construction, early August 2012
- Interactive map of the Skyvue area

General information
- Status: Construction abandoned (2014); site acquired by developer for new resort (2026)
- Type: Concrete pillars
- Location: Las Vegas Strip, Paradise, Nevada
- Coordinates: 36.093031°N 115.171732°W

Height
- Height: 500 feet (152.4 m) (proposed)

The Skyvue Las Vegas Super Wheel (also capitalized SkyVue) is a pair of concrete columns built to support a giant Ferris wheel across from the Mandalay Bay Hotel and Casino on the Las Vegas Strip in Paradise, Nevada. Only the concrete pillars were built. Construction of the wheel and the proposed larger 3-phase project for the site — London, Las Vegas — was abandoned.

London, Las Vegas, as suggested by the official website, was to be a 38.5-acre property featuring 1,300 hotel rooms, a casino, the Skyvue wheel and 550,000 square feet of restaurants and shops—all of which would be architectural replicas of various British landmarks and neighborhoods. The Skyvue wheel, being "Phase I of London, Las Vegas" was intended to feature a large display billed as the "largest outdoor advertising LED screen in the world".

The project was never completed and the property was sold in 2020, then advertised for sale again in 2022. The multi-acre plot was finally acquired by Nevada property developer Eli Applebaum in 2026, whose plans for a 752-room casino resort were approved by Clark County in July 2026.

== History ==
Skyvue was originally announced as being planned to be 476 ft (145 m) tall, but was later reported to potentially be 490 ft (150 m) or 500 ft (152.4 m). Approved by Clark County Commission in March 2011, it was announced at a media event and groundbreaking ceremony in May 2011 by Howard Bulloch of Compass Investments, who stated "we expect it to be up and running in time for New Year's 2012". The Happi Inn motel was demolished to make way for the Ferris wheel. It was originally expected to have 40 gondolas, each carrying 20-25 people, but in March 2012, when 1,300 cubic yards of concrete foundations were poured it was reported that there would only be 32 gondolas, each carrying 24 passengers, and that it would not open until July 4, 2013.

On March 5, 2012, Shotgun Creek Investments, headed by Wayne Perry, announced their involvement in the $300 million project. Shotgun Creek "invested tens of millions" into the project according to a statement from Skyvue.

In May 2012, the estimated opening date was further put back to late 2013, at which time it was also reported that construction of the two main support columns had reached a height of 60 ft (18.3 m). In July 2012, it was reported that Skyvue was scheduled to open on New Year's Eve, 2013, and that its support columns, which had reached a height of about 61 m (200 ft), should be completed within a month. In early 2013, Shotgun Creek made two loans totaling $9 million in the project.

A March 2013 update indicated the spindle and yoke were being assembled off site and would be installed "shortly". In July 2013, the developer stated "we anticipate construction to resume in the next couple of months". The projected opening was delayed until mid-2015. In January 2014, all scaffolding was removed from the columns, furthering speculation that the project would never be finished.

By November 2015, the property and unfinished Skyvue had been put up for sale. It was put up for sale again in 2020, and was sold to Perry later that year. He put the site up for sale in 2022.

In May 2026, the almost 12-acre Las Vegas Boulevard site was sold to developer Eli Applebaum, for $70 million, who plans to build a hotel and casino with a heart-shaped facade on the property. Plans for the new 752-room casino resort were approved by Clark County commissioners in July 2026.

== See also ==
- List of canceled Las Vegas casinos — London, Las Vegas
- Voyager, a giant Ferris wheel proposed several times for Las Vegas, but never built.
- High Roller, a giant Ferris wheel built in Las Vegas next to The Linq casino and resort.
