= Yitzhak Tshuva =

Israeli billionaire businessman (born 1948)

- יצחק תשובה
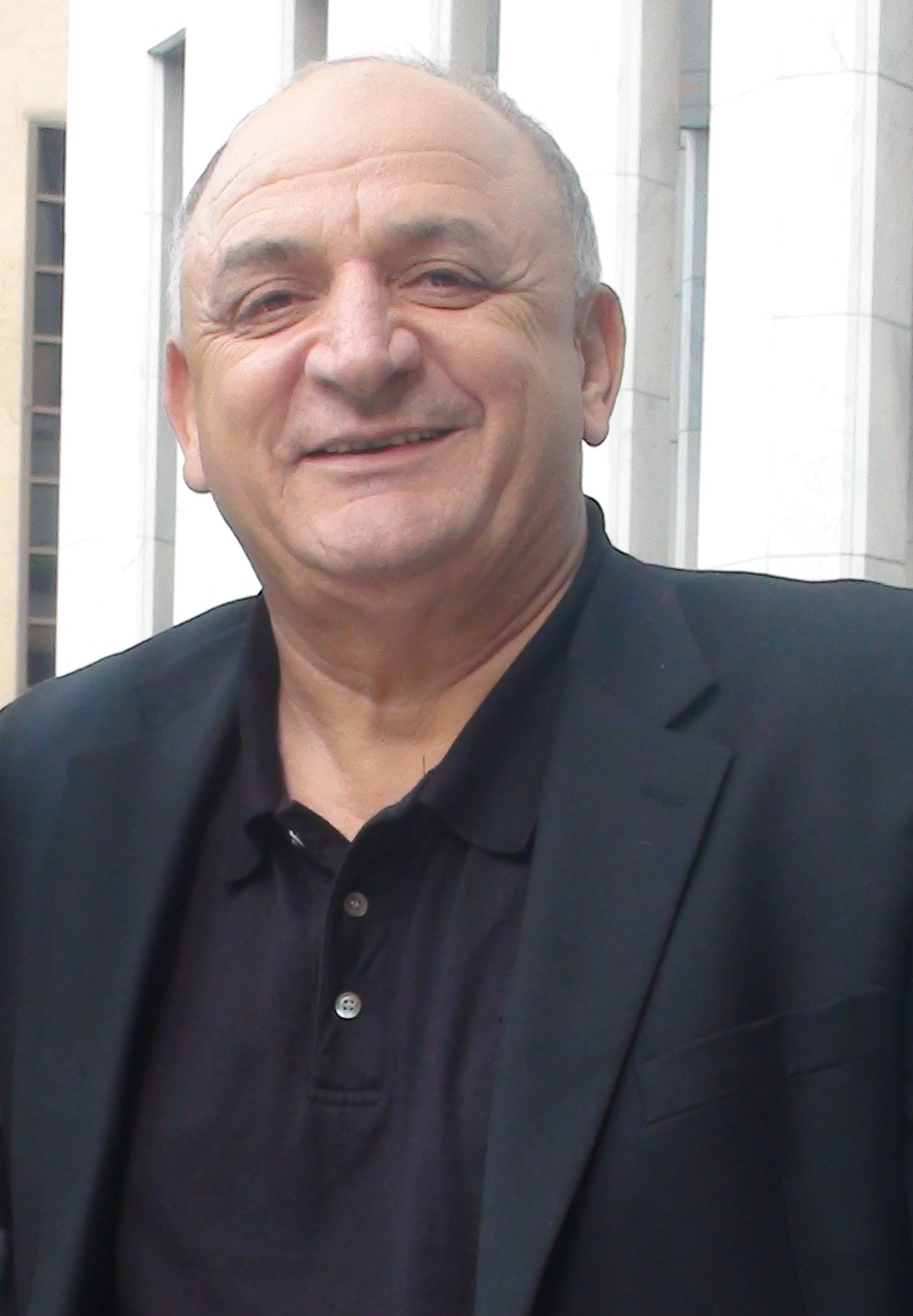
- Born: Yitzhak Tshuva; July 7, 1948 (age 78); Tripoli, Libya
- Other names: Yitzhak Sharon; Isaac Tshuva
- Occupation: Businessman
- Title: Founder of El-Ad Group; Majority shareholder of Delek Group
- Spouse: Chaya Tshuva
- Children: 5

Yitzhak Tshuva (Hebrew: יצחק תשובה; born July 7, 1948) is an Israeli billionaire businessman. He is the founder of El-Ad Group, a real estate development and holding company, which owned the New York Plaza Hotel. He also owns the Israeli conglomerate Delek Group. As of March 2026, Forbes estimated his net worth at US$8.3 billion.

== Early life ==
Tshuva was born to a Jewish family in Tripoli, Libya, in 1948. Around this time, his paternal grandfather, Rabbi Yosef (Susu) Tshuva, was murdered in the 1948 Libyan riots.

When Yitzhak Tshuva was six months old, his parents, Rachamin and Julia, and their eight children emigrated to Israel as part of the Jewish exodus from Arab and Muslim countries. They were initially housed in a transit camp near Pardesiya before settling in Netanya. Tshuva studied at the "Yavne" primary school. At the age of 12, Tshuva began working to support his family by taking on construction and farming jobs. He did his mandatory military service in the Israel Defense Forces in the Engineering Corps. After his service, he began working in the construction and engineering department of the Israeli Defense Ministry, where he was responsible for a variety of construction projects, primarily on military bases all over the country. One of these projects included the construction of fortifications along the Bar Lev Line, near the Suez Canal, after Israel captured the Sinai Peninsula from Egypt in the 1967 Six-Day War.

== Career ==
In the 1970s, Tshuva became a developer of low-income neighborhoods, primarily in his home town of Netanya. He was involved in the construction of hundreds of apartments in the city. In 1978, Tshuva joined local politics by founding the "Manof" party. At the 1978 municipal elections, Manof won three seats in the Netanya city council. In his capacity as member of the Netanya city council, Yitzhak Tshuva was in charge of construction, development, and neighborhood restoration. In the 1980s, Tshuva initiated a number of large residency and commercial projects across Israel.

In 1988, Tshuva and his family immigrated to the United States for a number of years. During this time, he was involved in the construction of many real estate projects in New Jersey and New York City. In 1992, he founded El Ad Holdings (also known as El Ad Group) which manages the majority of his real estate transactions in North America. In the mid 1990s, El Ad Group purchased thousands of residential and commercial properties in New York and Florida, and in the Canadian cities of Toronto and Montreal. It also purchased thousands of rental properties on the west coast of the US.

In 2004, El Ad Group purchased the Plaza Hotel in New York City for $675mn from the Saudi investor, Al-Waleed bin Talal. El Ad Group sold 182 residential apartments prior to the hotel's renewed opening in 2008. Apartments were sold for record breaking prices in Manhattan at the time. This transaction was said to have garnered about $1 billion. In 2013, El Ad Group sold its share of the hotel and surrounding commercial property.

Tshuva's major business breakthrough came in 1998, when he managed to gain control of Delek Israel Fuel Corporation from the Recanati family's Israel Discount Bank Holdings. Tshuva grew Delek Group into an energy company dealing with petrol, natural gas, insurance, biochemistry, armored vehicles and the like. Delek discovered offshore natural gas reserves in Israel and Cyprus. In January 2009, 320 billion cubic meters of gas reserves were discovered in the "Tamar 1" and "Dalit" gas fields. The drilling, close to Israel's shores, was carried out by Delek Group and an American company, Noble Energy. In 2010, gas reserves of 600 billion cubic meters were discovered in the Leviathan gas field. Later, gas reserves were also discovered in drillings at "Dolphin", "Tanin", and "Block 12" in Cyprus. The discoveries by Delek Group have reduced Israel's dependence on foreign energy sources. These reserves can accommodate Israel's predicted energy requirements for the next few decades while enabling the export of natural gas. As of 2014, Delek Group's market value was about $4.5 billion.

In 2009, Tschuva announced his intention to make a major investment to pursue the construction of the Red Sea–Dead Sea Water Conveyance.

== Dispositions ==
In June 2015, he sold a majority stake of Phoenix Insurance Company to the Chinese company Fosun International for NIS 1.8 billion. In June 2017, Israel Chemicals Ltd. (ICL) and the Delek group sold their 50% stake in the water desalination company IDE Technologies.

In 2020, when the COVID-19 pandemic started and demand for fossil fuels dropped, Tshuva's main holding Delek started to shake, as it was living off a NIS 6 billion debt owned to its bondholders. He sold assets to bring some cash back in the balance.

In May 2020, Yitzhak sold 70.7% of ELAD Israel Residences, which focused on residential developments in Israel, to JTLV (Jerusalem Tel Aviv Investments) for NIS 198 million, and the remaining 25% for NIS 68.5 million in November 2021 (the 4.3% left belonged to the CEO Ronen Jaffa). In October 2020, he sold 70% of Delek Israel to Lahav LR Real Estate and Uri Mantzur for NIS 525 million. In August 2020, he sold Elad Canada Realty to Rester Management of Canada for CA$508 million. In January 2021, he sold his 22% stake of the broadcaster Keshet for $16 million, and 107.5 acres of land in Acre to Tidhar and Harel Insurance Investments and Financial Services Ltd. for NIS 200 million. In April 2021, he sold 22% of his shares of Tamar Petroleum (a Delek Drilling spinoff) to Mubadala Petroleum to Eli Azur. In February 2021, Tshuva and Yakir Gabay sold their US rental property company Star (14,414 housing units in eleven states) to Morgan Properties and Olayan America for $1.75 billion. In July 2021, he sold the Queen of Sheba Eilat Hotel for NIS 458 million (including a NIS 250 million debt).

In January 2026, Yitzhak Tshuva attempted to buy 27% of Herzliya Medical Center, but the purchase ran into regulatory complications.

== Personal life ==
Tshuva and his wife, Haya, live in the Park Bavli project in Old North, Tel Aviv. They have five children. His daughter Gal Naor is an architect.

Yitzhak Tshuva financed the construction of the Sha’arei Teshuva synagogue in the Western Wall Tunnels, adjacent to the small kabbalistic synagogue created by Rabbi Yehuda Getz. The project was inaugurated in December 2017. It was designed by Teshuva's daughter Gal Naor, with onyx floors illuminated from below. The main synagogue has a capacity of 150 people. Shoham Engineering performed much of the work on the site, including reinforcing the ancient arches covering the space, and designing and installing the lower level ceiling upon which the illuminated onyx floor rests.
