= New Frontier Hotel and Casino =

Historic hotel and casino on the Las Vegas Strip in Paradise, Nevada

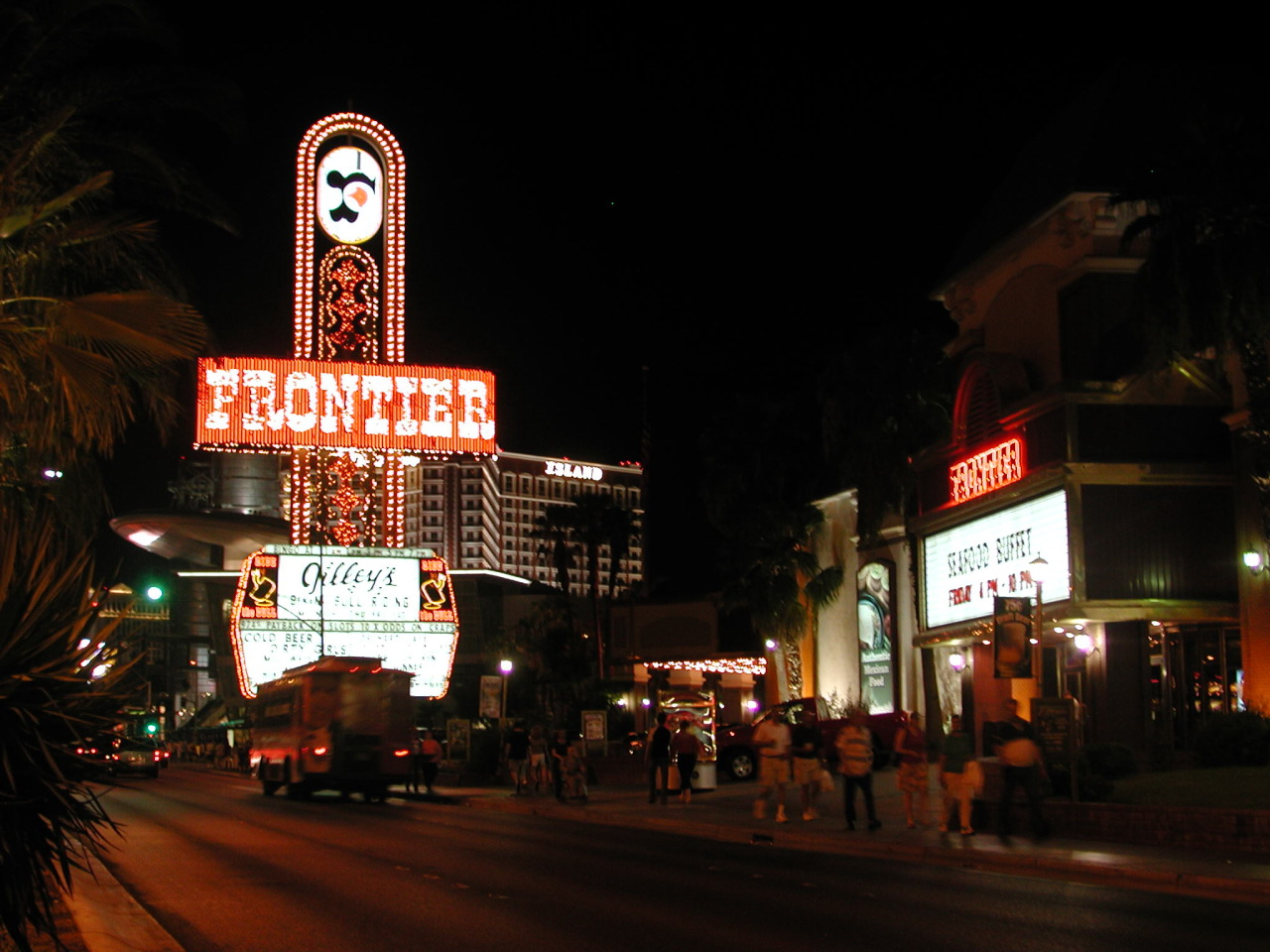
- The New Frontier in 2004

- Location within Las Vegas Strip Location within Nevada
- Interactive map of New Frontier Hotel and Casino
- Location: Paradise, Nevada; 3120 South Las Vegas Boulevard; 36°7′46″N 115°10′6″W
- Opened: October 30, 1942; 84 years ago (Hotel Last Frontier); April 4, 1955; 71 years ago (New Frontier); July 29, 1967; 59 years ago (The Frontier)
- Closed: July 16, 2007; 19 years ago
- Theme: Western
- No. of rooms: 105 (as of 1942); 650 (as of 1967); 984 (as of 2007)
- Gaming space: 41,325 sq ft (3,839.2 m^{2}) (as of 1998)
- Signature attractions: Gilley's Saloon
- Casino type: Land-based
- Owner: R.E. Griffith (original owner); William J. Moore (1943–51); Various groups (1951–67); Hughes Tool Company (1967–73); Summa Corporation (1973–88); Elardi family (1988–98); Phil Ruffin (1998–2007); El Ad Properties (2007)
- Architect: William J. Moore (1942); Albert Criz (1955); Rissman & Rissman (1966)
- Previous names: Hotel Last Frontier (1942–65); New Frontier (1955–65); The Frontier (1967–98)
- Renovated in: 1948, 1954–55, 1978, 1989–90, 1998

The New Frontier (formerly Hotel Last Frontier and The Frontier) was a hotel and casino on the Las Vegas Strip in Paradise, Nevada. The property began as a casino and dance club known as Pair O' Dice, opened in 1931. It was sold in 1941, and incorporated into the Hotel Last Frontier, which began construction at the end of the year. The Hotel Last Frontier opened on October 30, 1942, as the second resort on the Las Vegas Strip. The western-themed property included 105 rooms, as well as the Little Church of the West. The resort was devised by R.E. Griffith and designed by his nephew, William J. Moore. Following Griffith's death in 1943, Moore took over ownership and added a western village in 1948. The village consisted of authentic Old West buildings from a collector and would also feature the newly built Silver Slipper casino, added in 1950.

Resort ownership changed several times between different groups, beginning in 1951. A modernized expansion opened on April 4, 1955, as the New Frontier. It operated concurrently with the Last Frontier. Both were closed in 1965 and demolished a year later to make way for a new resort, which opened as the Frontier on July 29, 1967. Future casino mogul Steve Wynn was among investors in the ownership group, marking his entry into the Las Vegas gaming industry. The ownership group also included several individuals who had difficulty gaining approval from Nevada gaming regulators.

Businessman Howard Hughes bought out the group at the end of 1967. Like his other casino properties, he owned the Frontier through Hughes Tool Company, and later through Summa Corporation. In 1988, Summa sold the Frontier to Margaret Elardi, and her two sons became co-owners a year later. A 16-story hotel tower was added in 1990. The Elardi family declined to renew a contract with the Culinary Workers Union, and 550 workers went on strike on September 21, 1991. It became one of the longest strikes in U.S. history. Businessman Phil Ruffin eventually purchased the Frontier for $167 million. The sale was finalized on February 1, 1998, when Ruffin renamed the property back to the New Frontier. The strike ended on the same day, as Ruffin agreed to a union contract. Ruffin launched a $20 million renovation to update the aging property. His changes included the addition of a new restaurant, Gilley's Saloon.

Over the next decade, Ruffin considered several redevelopment projects for the site, but lack of financing hindered these plans. In May 2007, he agreed to sell the New Frontier to El Ad Properties for more than $1.2 billion. The resort closed on July 16, 2007, and demolition began later that year. The 16-story tower was imploded on November 13, 2007. It was the last of the Hughes-era casinos to be demolished. The 984-room property had been popular as a low-budget alternative to the larger resorts on the Strip. El Ad owned the Plaza Hotel in New York City and planned to replace the New Frontier with a Plaza-branded resort, but the project was canceled due to the Great Recession. Crown Resorts also scrapped plans to build the Alon Las Vegas resort. The site was purchased by Wynn Resorts in 2018, although plans to build the Wynn West resort were also shelved, and the land remains vacant.

The property hosted numerous entertainers throughout its operation, including Wayne Newton and Robert Goulet. It hosted the Las Vegas debuts of Liberace in 1944, and Elvis Presley in 1956, and also hosted the final performance of Diana Ross & The Supremes in 1970.

== History ==
A portion of the property began as a casino and dance club known as Pair O' Dice. It opened on July 4, 1931, and was remodeled and enlarged during its first year. It was originally owned by casino dealer Frank Detra. Businessman Guy McAfee took over club operations in 1939. He remodeled the property and renamed it the 91 Club, after its location on Highway 91, which would later become the Las Vegas Strip. He purchased the club later in 1939, for $10,000.

=== Hotel Last Frontier (1942–65) ===
McAfee sold the 91 Club in late 1941, to a group based in Arizona. R.E. “Griff” Griffith, the brother of film director D.W. Griffith, and owner of a movie theater chain in the southwestern U.S., paid $1,000 per acre for the 35-acre site. In addition to theaters, Griffith also owned the El Rancho Hotel & Motel in Gallup, New Mexico, and planned to expand it into a hotel chain. Griffith had originally planned to build his next hotel in Deming, New Mexico, before traveling to Las Vegas and realizing that it presented better opportunities. He intended to construct a western-themed hotel-casino resort on the newly purchased land. However, his initial name for the project was already in use by the El Rancho Vegas, which opened in 1941 as the first resort on the Las Vegas Strip. Instead, Griffith named his property the Hotel Last Frontier, while maintaining the western theme.

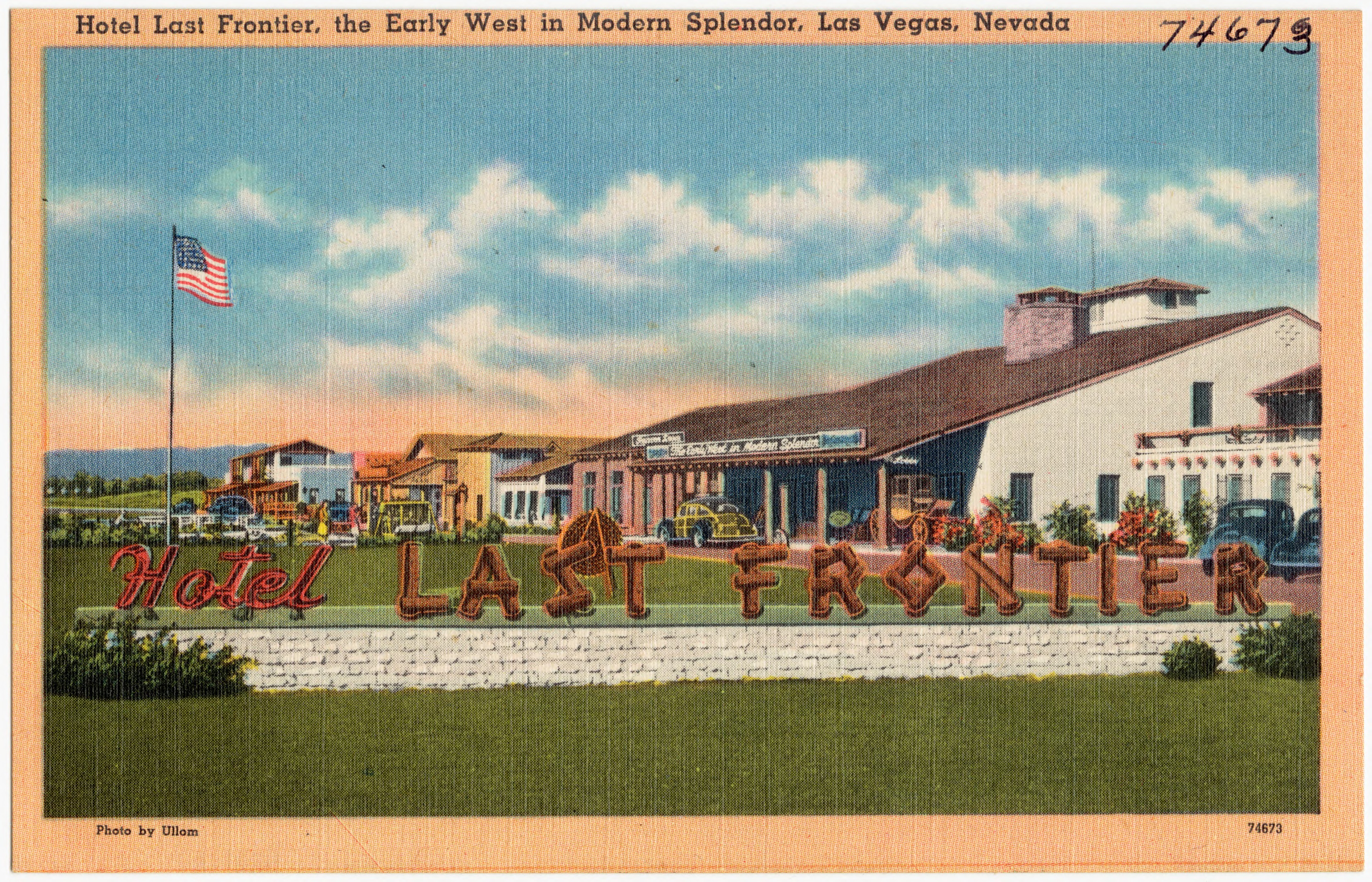
Early postcard for the Hotel Last Frontier

Griffith hired architect William J. Moore, his nephew, to design the project, with emphasis on an authentic recreation of the Old West. Construction began on December 8, 1941, taking place around the 91 Club, which was incorporated into the new project as the Leo Carrillo Bar. It was named after Griffith's friend, entertainer Leo Carrillo. Building materials were difficult to acquire, due to a supply shortage caused by World War II. Moore purchased one or two abandoned mines in Pioche, Nevada, and sent crews to strip the sites of any usable materials. Moore also purchased two ranches in Moapa, Nevada, to supply meat and dairy for the resort.

The Hotel Last Frontier opened on October 30, 1942. It was the second hotel-casino resort to open on the Las Vegas Strip. The motel was mostly two stories, with some rooms on a third floor. It included 105 rooms at its opening, and an additional 100 would be added later. To maintain cool temperatures, cold water was carried through pipes in the walls of each room, originating from tunnels beneath the property.

Because Griffith and Moore were inexperienced in the gaming industry, they had the casino built at the rear of the property, not realizing that it should have been presented as the main attraction. The property included the Gay Nineties Bar, which had sat in the Arizona Club in Las Vegas, before being reassembled at the Last Frontier. The Frontier added the Little Church of the West in May 1943. The resort also included the El Corral Arena, used for rodeo events.

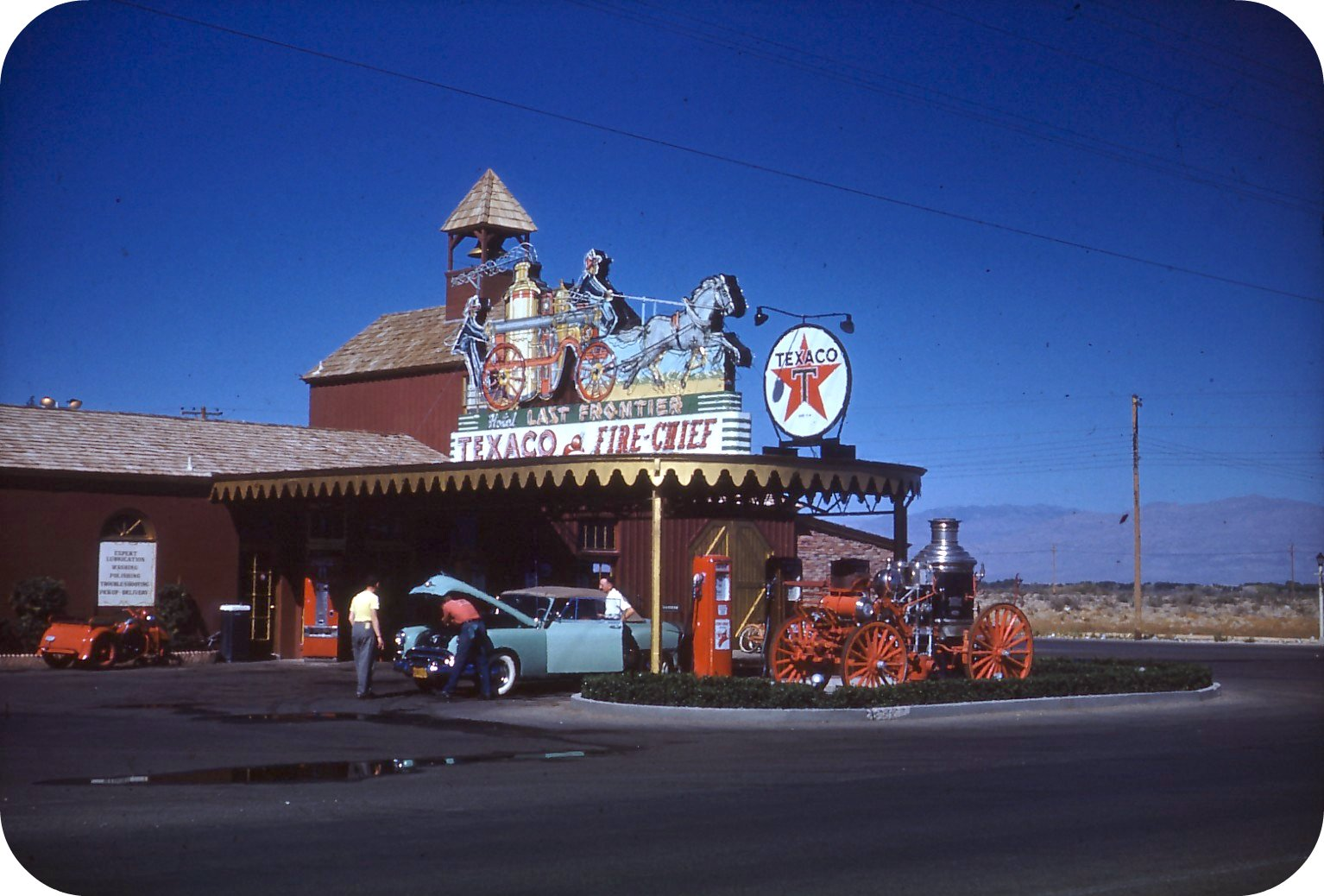
Texaco gas station at the Hotel Last Frontier, late 1940s

Griffith died of a heart attack in November 1943, and Moore took over the property. Moore conceived an idea to add the western-themed Last Frontier Village. It opened in November 1948, initially with three buildings while others would be added later. The village ultimately included restaurants, bars, and shops. The Little Church of the West was also incorporated into the village. Located at the property's northern end, the village included authentic Old West buildings saved by Doby Doc, a collector in Elko, Nevada. He served as curator of the attraction. The village also featured some newly built replicas created by the resort, including a Texaco gas station designed by Zick & Sharp. It offered free showers and restrooms to attract motorists to the resort. The Silver Slipper casino was added to the village in 1950.

The Last Frontier was sold in 1951, to a group led by McAfee. The new ownership included Jake Kozloff and Beldon Katleman, the latter of whom also owned the El Rancho Vegas. By 1954, Kozloff was the primary stockholder, and the ownership group now included Murray Randolph.

=== New Frontier (1955–65) ===
In June 1954, construction began on a $2 million expansion known as the New Frontier, designed by architect Albert Criz. The project included more rooms, new restaurants, and additional casino space. The Little Church of the West was relocated elsewhere on the property to make room for the new facilities. Later that year, Katleman sued several resort executives, including Kozloff, his brother William Kozloff, and Randolph. Katleman alleged that the trio had undisclosed partners invested in the resort, going against state law. He also alleged that the men began expansion of the resort without first obtaining a loan to cover the costs. The Nevada Tax Commission launched an investigation into the resort's hidden ownership.

An opening celebration for the New Frontier was held on April 4, 1955. It served as a modernized expansion of the Hotel Last Frontier, which continued to operate under its original name. Singer Mario Lanza was scheduled to perform for the opening, but canceled at the last minute due to laryngitis, forcing the property to refund $20,000 in tickets.

Jake Kozloff resigned as president and general manager a few weeks after the opening. He and Randolph sold their interest to a new investor group, which finalized their purchase in May 1955, after paying more than $1 million to creditors. Katleman had sought to prevent the sale, as the resort was heavily mortgaged under the new group's financial setup. Katleman had also gotten into a fist fight with Maury Friedman, a member of the group who was denied ownership by the tax commission. Friedman was approved for an ownership stake later in 1955, along with seven other new partners in the group. Katleman's 1954 suit against Kozloff and Randolph was settled a few months later.

An expansion project was announced later in 1955. The adjacent Royal Nevada hotel-casino, located north of the Frontier, was taken over by the latter's ownership group in 1956. The Royal Nevada then briefly served as an annex to the New Frontier. Later that year, a new group took over operations and invested $301,000 into the New Frontier, which was struggling financially. The group included Vera Krupp, the estranged wife of Alfried Krupp von Bohlen und Halbach. Krupp oversaw operations with Louis Manchon, a swimming pool contractor. The previous group, including Friedman, returned to take over operations in early March 1957, after Krupp declined to invest any further in the struggling resort. Krupp alleged that stockholders had misled her on the monetary potential of the New Frontier. The property owed approximately $100,000 to creditors, not including back taxes sought by the U.S. government. Federal agents seized more than $1 million in assets from the property, which closed its facilities on March 18, 1957, with the exception of the hotel. The New Frontier later went into bankruptcy. Restaurant and bar operations eventually resumed.

In mid-1958, a new operating group – led by Los Angeles shirt manufacturer Jack Barenfield – proposed a $400,000 investment to reopen the casino and operate it on a limited basis. The Nevada Gaming Control Board was skeptical that the group would have enough funds to keep the casino operational for long.

Warren Bayley, one of the primary owners of the Hacienda resort, reached a deal to take over the New Frontier from Katleman and Friedman. The $6.5 million deal was finalized on October 1, 1958. The property was leased to Bayley, who agreed to pay off its debts. Actor Preston Foster served as vice president for Frontier Properties, Inc. The casino area reopened in April 1959. Two years later, Idaho banker and construction company owner Frank Wester sought to take over the property. Wester was approved by state gaming regulators, but failed to follow through on the deal.

=== The Frontier (1967–98) ===
Bayley became the primary owner of the New Frontier Hotel in November 1964. He died a month later, and the casino was closed on New Year's Eve, in preparation for an expansion. The hotel and other facilities closed a few days later, and the property never reopened. Bankers Life purchased Frontier Properties Inc. in August 1965, and leased it to a new company, Vegas Frontier Inc., overseen by Friedman. Six months later, Friedman announced plans to demolish the existing facilities entirely for a larger Frontier resort to be built on the site. The demolition process reached its final stage in May 1966. The western village was included in the demolition, although the Little Church of the West and the Silver Slipper casino were kept.

Groundbreaking for a new Frontier hotel-casino took place on September 26, 1966, with Friedman set to oversee casino operations. The new project had more than a dozen investors, including future casino mogul Steve Wynn, who purchased a three-percent stake. The Frontier marked Wynn's entry into the Las Vegas gaming industry. It was later discovered that the Frontier project was financed with Detroit mob money, from a group led by Anthony Joseph Zerilli.

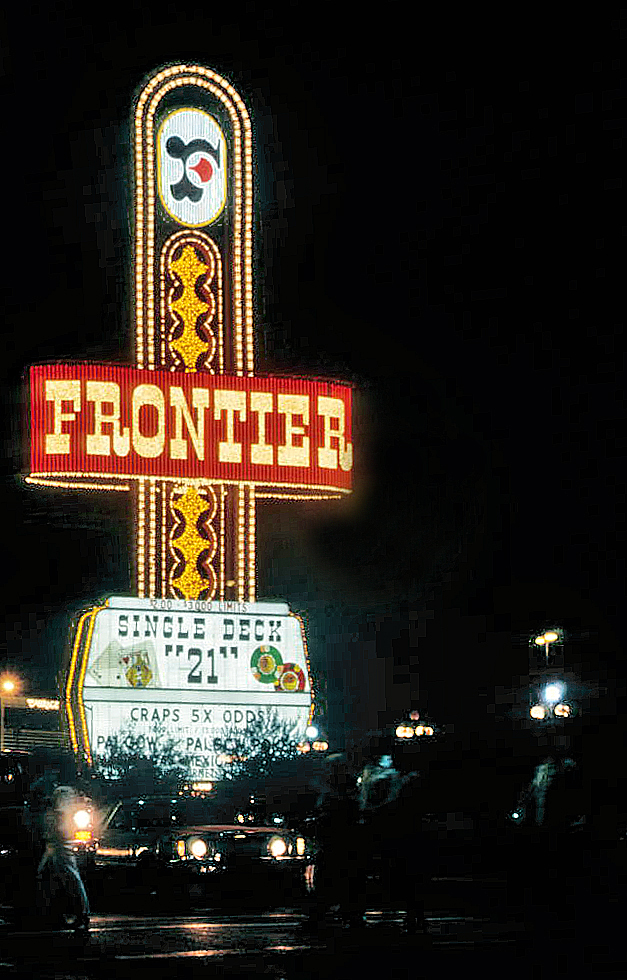
Frontier sign, 1989

The $25 million Frontier opened on July 29, 1967, with a four-day celebration. It included 650 hotel rooms, entertainment venues, several restaurants, and convention space. The project was designed by Rissman & Rissman. The Frontier's roadside sign had a height of 184 feet, making it the tallest in Las Vegas. The sign, along with the Frontier's new "F" logo, was designed by Bill Clark of Ad Art. The sign featured 16-foot-tall letters, with the giant "F" logo resting at the top.

Several individuals in the new property, including Friedman, had difficulty gaining approval of state gaming regulators. Businessman Howard Hughes bought out the group in December 1967, paying $23 million for the Frontier. Like his other casino properties, it was originally operated through Hughes Tool Company, until Hughes's Summa Corporation took over in 1973. Hughes died three years later. A $5 million renovation concluded in 1978. Later that year, the Little Church of the West was relocated to the Hacienda resort, making room for the Fashion Show Mall to be built just south of the Frontier.

In December 1987, Summa agreed to sell the Frontier and Silver Slipper – the last of Hughes's Las Vegas gaming properties – to casino owner Margaret Elardi. She took over ownership of the Frontier on June 30, 1988, and acquired the Silver Slipper later that year, demolishing the latter to add a Frontier parking lot. In December 1989, Elardi's two sons, John and Tom, became part-owners with her in the Frontier. The 16-story Atrium Tower, consisting of 400 suites, was opened a month later.

Under the Elardis' ownership, the Frontier focused primarily on a low-budget clientele of slot players. It offered few amenities, at a time when new megaresorts were becoming popular on the Las Vegas Strip.

==== Strike ====
The Frontier had a labor agreement with the Culinary Workers Union that expired on July 1, 1989. Upon its expiration, general manager Tom Elardi said that the union presented the Frontier with two contract renewal choices, with no option to negotiate; he said the family would not have purchased the Frontier if they had known this would happen. Citing a reduction in salaries and worker benefits, 550 workers went on strike on September 21, 1991. Politicians such as Jesse Jackson expressed support for the strikers, who represented four unions, including Culinary.

The strike ran continuously on the sidewalk in front of the resort, and striking workers were occasionally violent towards patrons who crossed the picket line. In April 1993, California tourist Sean White and his family were verbally and physically assaulted by the strikers. Seven union workers were charged in the incident, and the union itself settled with the Whites after they filed a lawsuit. Sean White also sued the Frontier, seeking damages for his injuries and alleging inadequate security at the resort. He claimed that the property was aware of the strikers being particularly agitated on the night of the incident, yet did nothing to resolve the situation. The Frontier countered that the Whites provoked the strikers. Furthermore, Tom Elardi said that guests were always warned about possible verbal abuse from the strikers when making hotel reservations. He also said that, according to the National Labor Relations Board (NLRB), it would be illegal to label the strikers as "violent". In addition, Elardi said that Frontier security did not have the authority to help guests on public property, where the incident took place. A jury eventually ruled in the Frontier's favor, finding it not liable for events that take place on public property.

In late 1991, the Frontier ran controversial ads in the Los Angeles Times implying that the entire Strip was being targeted by the strike. The property eventually stopped running the ads after protests from other resorts. Business at the Frontier saw a 40-percent decrease during the first year of the strike. In 1993, Nevada governor Bob Miller appointed a fact finder to help resolve the strike, although these efforts failed after 28 meetings. Miller later called the Frontier an embarrassment to the state for its refusal to end the strike. Margaret Elardi wanted to settle with the union and end the strike, but her sons opposed the idea.

Numerous complaints against the Frontier were filed with the NLRB. In 1995, a federal court ruled that the resort had to pay back work-related benefits that it had cut off to striking workers. The NLRB later ruled in favor of the union, agreeing with the 1995 ruling and calling the dispute an unfair labor practice strike. Negotiations between the Culinary union and the Elardis took place in July 1996, but ended without a resolution, in part because Tom Elardi refused a Culinary mandate to rehire all of the striking workers: "I believe the ones who've been violent or who participated in major picket line misconduct shouldn't come back. The union says that's the only way they will settle, but I absolutely refuse to take them back".

Arthur Goldberg, chairman of Bally Entertainment, announced in July 1996 that there was interest in purchasing the Frontier and ending the strike. At the time, Hilton Hotels Corporation was in the process of acquiring Bally. Goldberg was willing to purchase the Frontier himself if Hilton should pass on it. His plan would potentially include demolishing all or part of the Frontier to make way for a 3,000-room resort. Wynn and casino rival Donald Trump were also rumored to have an interest in buying the Frontier. Trump passed on the property, as he found Elardi's $208 million asking price too high. Hilton and Goldberg also did not proceed with a purchase, and the strike continued.

===== Allegations =====
In late 1996, a former Frontier worker alleged that the Elardis ran a technologically advanced spy operation to monitor the strike. It was also used to monitor Frontier security guards, as well as officers of the Las Vegas Metropolitan Police Department whenever they came to view video footage of the strike. The operation allegedly included security cameras and listening devices, operated from a second-floor headquarters known as the 900 Room that was overseen by 15 people. The worker also said that the resort routinely sabotaged the strike, for instance by turning on nearby sprinklers or placing manure bags near a catering truck. Tom Elardi called the worker disgruntled. He said the 900 Room functioned only to monitor and maintain the exterior during the strike, denying that any sabotage had taken place.

Other former workers came forward to confirm the spying allegation, stating that there was a high level of paranoia relating to the strike. Some workers said that the Frontier had tapped its office phones to monitor conversations, allegations which led to an FBI investigation. Concerned that strikers might stay at the hotel to gain information, Frontier officials also had recording devices planted in certain guest rooms which were to be occupied only by confirmed members of the strike, allowing the hotel to spy on them. The spying operation allegedly went beyond the resort, as some workers said they were tasked with following strikers around. Others collected garbage from the Culinary headquarters in hopes of gaining incriminating information.

After the allegations came to light, strikers filed 75 criminal complaints against the Frontier, and the Nevada Gaming Control Board opened an investigation. Meanwhile, the AFL–CIO launched a campaign to raise awareness about the strike, with president John Sweeney calling the Frontier "one of the biggest corporate criminals" in American history. The AFL-CIO also opened a committee investigation into the strike. John Elardi later admitted that the 900 Room was used for spying, stating that he created it in 1992, without first consulting Margaret or Tom Elardi. He also acknowledged using sprinklers on the strikers, after police stopped responding to the resort's calls about trespassing picketers.

===== Resolution =====
In October 1997, businessman Phil Ruffin reached an agreement to buy the Frontier from the Elardis for $167 million. He also agreed to sign a contract with the union, putting an end to the strike. Ruffin's application for a gaming license was fast-tracked to expedite the sale and end the strike sooner. Prior to the announcement of Ruffin's purchase, the Nevada Gaming Control Board was prepared to file a complaint revoking the Frontier's gaming license, due to the property's conduct during the strike.

Ruffin completed his purchase on February 1, 1998, ending the 2,325-day strike. It was among the longest strikes in U.S. history, and the Culinary union had spent $26 million on it. Approximately 300 of the 550 striking workers returned to their jobs. Striking employees received a total of nearly $5 million in back-pay and trust fund contributions. On the day of the purchase, a celebration event was held at the resort, and was attended by 3,000 people.

=== New Frontier (1998–2007) ===
Upon taking ownership, Ruffin renamed the property back to the New Frontier. It had 986 rooms and a 41,325 sq ft (3,839.2 m^{2}) casino, and catered to a middle-class clientele. The resort had become outdated during the strike, and lacked basic features such as fulltime room service and a 24-hour coffee shop. Profits improved following a $20 million renovation project, which included new restaurants and a remodeled sportsbook.

Gilley's Saloon, a country western restaurant, was among the additions. It included a mechanical bull, a dance hall, and live music. The 10,000 sq ft (930 m^{2}) saloon opened in December 1998. Ruffin got the idea for the restaurant after seeing the 1980 film Urban Cowboy, which had featured the Gilley's Club in Texas, along with its mechanical bull. Ruffin subsequently partnered with country singer Mickey Gilley to open the saloon, inspired by the original club. Gilley's later offered bikini bull-riding and mud wrestling.

Ruffin intended to rebrand the hotel as a Radisson, and renovated the guest rooms to bring them up to standard. However, in 1999, he decided against this idea as he now had other plans for the property. In January 2000, Ruffin announced plans to demolish the New Frontier in five or six months to make way for a new casino resort, scheduled to open in 2002. The new project, known as City by the Bay, would include a San Francisco theme and more than 2,500 rooms. Ruffin said the new resort was necessary to stay competitive on the Las Vegas Strip. The project would cost up to $700 million. He put his redevelopment plans on hold in May 2000, because of difficulty raising the necessary funds. Ruffin said the project would eventually proceed. The New Frontier continued operations in the meantime, and remained profitable.

In 2002, Ruffin partnered with Trump to build Trump International Hotel Las Vegas. It was constructed on the Frontier property's southwest corner, taking up part of a rear parking lot. Meanwhile, Ruffin still had difficulty acquiring funds to build City by the Bay, and his plans evolved several times over the years. At one point, Ruffin considered a Trump-branded resort to replace the New Frontier. In 2003, Ruffin was in discussions with several casino operators about a possible joint venture for a new resort on the Frontier site. At the end of 2004, he said he would redevelop the New Frontier site on his own, stating that he had turned down a dozen offers from potential partners. By 2006, Ruffin's unnamed resort project was planned to include a 485-foot Ferris wheel. Later that year, Ruffin announced that the new casino resort would be named Montreux, after the Swiss town of the same name. The $2 billion resort would include 2,750 rooms.

However, by March 2007, Ruffin was in negotiations to sell the New Frontier to El Ad Properties, which owned the Plaza Hotel in New York City. A sale agreement was announced two months later, with El Ad paying approximately $35 million per acre for the 35-acre site. At more than $1.2 billion, it was the most expensive real estate transaction on the Strip. El Ad planned to demolish the New Frontier and build a $5 billion Plaza-branded resort in its place.

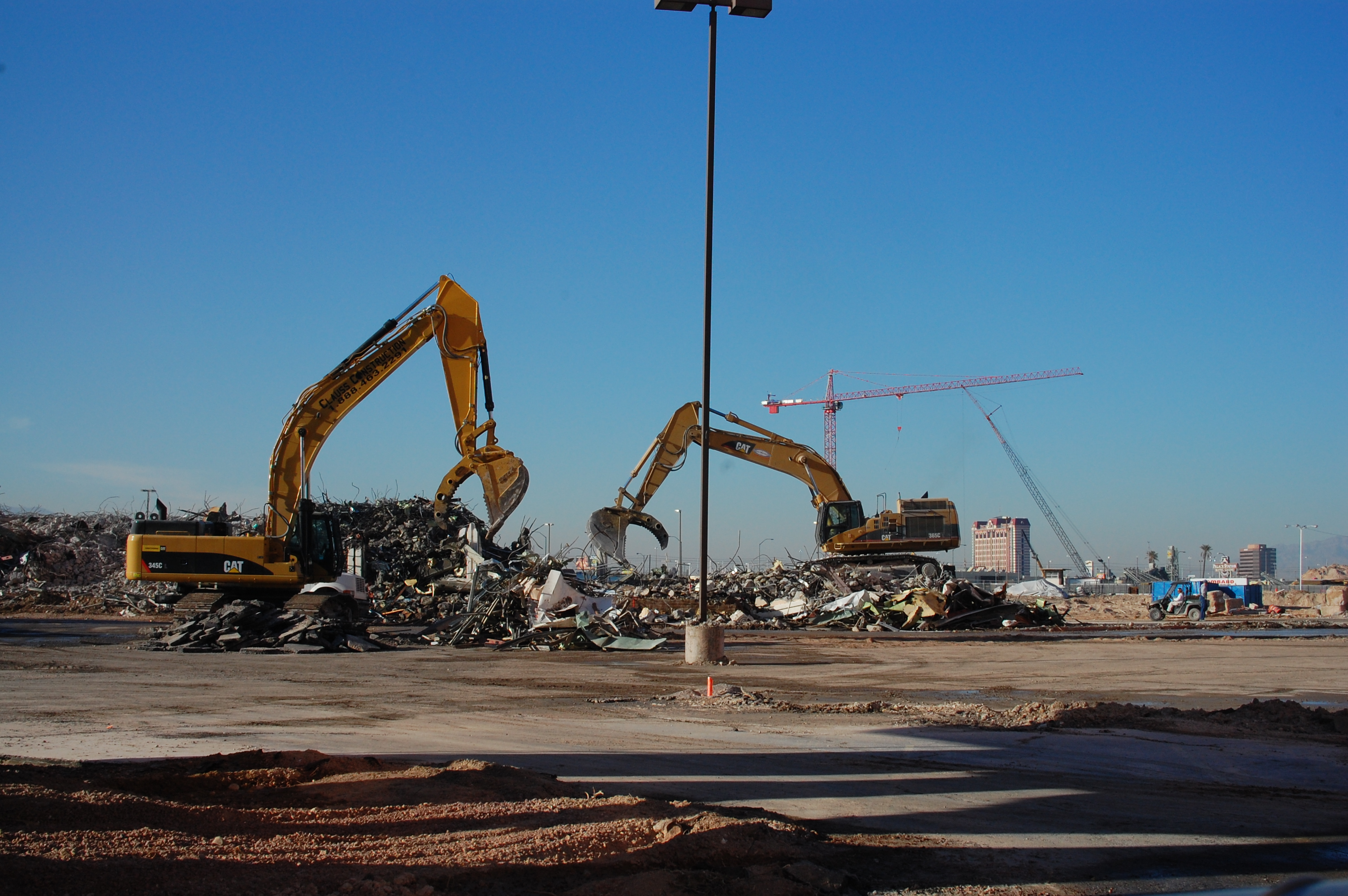
Demolition cleanup, January 2008

The New Frontier closed on July 16, 2007, at 12:01 a.m. The closing was a low-key event. At the time, the New Frontier operated the last remaining bingo room on the Strip, and was one of the few remaining casinos to still use coin-operated slot machines. El Ad completed its purchase three weeks after the closure.

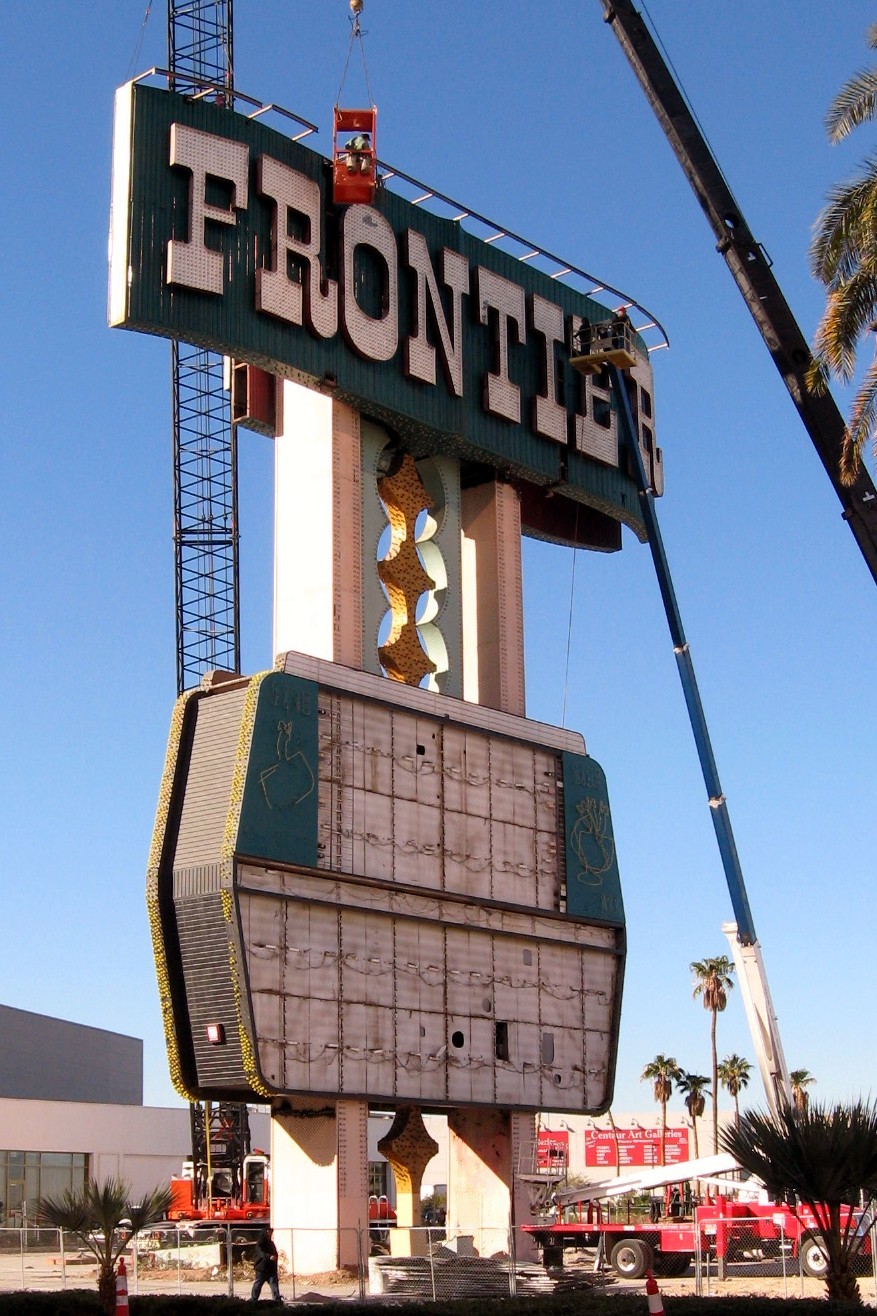
Sign removal

The 984-room New Frontier had remained popular as a low-budget alternative to larger resorts nearby. However, it lacked the same popularity as previous resorts such as the Sands, Stardust, and Desert Inn. In 2006, readers of the Las Vegas Review-Journal voted it "Hotel Most Deserving of Being Imploded". Wynn, who now owned the Wynn Las Vegas resort across the street, called the aging Frontier "the single biggest toilet in Las Vegas".

The New Frontier was the last of the Hughes-era casinos to be demolished. After a five-minute fireworks show, the 16-story Atrium Tower was imploded on November 13, 2007, at 2:37 a.m. to the thousands of spectators that turned out to view the demolition. The tower was imploded by Controlled Demolition, Inc., which had worked on other Las Vegas hotel implosions. The interior was stripped down allowing for the insertion of dynamite, totaling 1,040 pounds and spread across 6,200 different areas of the tower. The implosion left a four-story pile of concrete, glass and steel remains. Two low-rise hotel wings were demolished with the use of an excavator, although the discovery of asbestos slowed the process down.

The roadside sign was left up until December 2008, when Wynn requested that it be taken down ahead of the opening for Encore Las Vegas, an addition to his Wynn property. The city's Neon Museum sought to save portions of the sign.

=== Redevelopment proposals ===
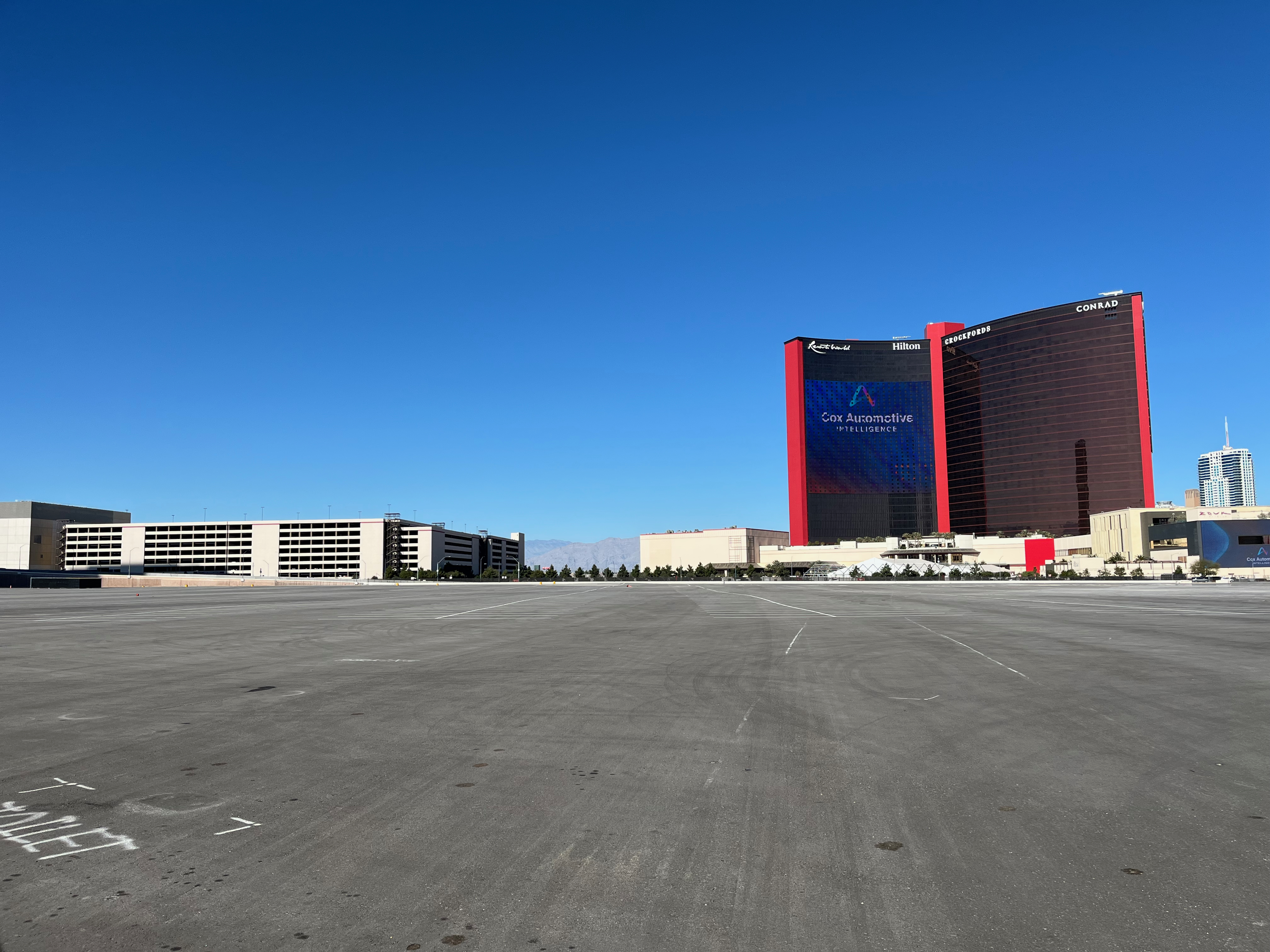
The former Frontier site in 2026

Following the closure of the New Frontier, there had been multiple redevelopment proposals.

The Plaza project failed to materialize, due to financial problems brought on by the Great Recession. Wynn offered to beautify the vacant site with landscaping, and was also approached by El Ad several times to take over the land and develop it. However, he declined as he considered such a project too much of a financial risk. Wynn blamed what he saw as anti-business policies of U.S. president Barack Obama, and a challenging level of debt as a consequence of El Ad having paid what proved too high a price for the property.

In 2014, Crown Resorts purchased the property for $280 million and partnered with Oaktree Capital Management. A year later, they announced plans to build a casino resort known as Alon Las Vegas. However, Crown Resorts pulled out of the project in 2016, and it was eventually canceled.

Wynn Resorts bought the land and four adjacent acres in early 2018, for $336 million. The company announced plans to build Wynn West, a new casino resort to complement the existing Wynn and Encore properties. Steve Wynn, amid sexual assault allegations against him, resigned from his company shortly after the announcement. Matt Maddox took over as CEO, and plans for Wynn West were shelved. In 2024, the county extended permits for the site, giving Wynn until April 2026 to begin construction on an unnamed resort expansion. The project would include additional casino space and a hotel tower with 1,100 rooms. However the deadline for the project was not set and the project was put on hold.

== Entertainment ==
The Hotel Last Frontier opened with an entertainment venue known as the Ramona Room. Liberace made his Las Vegas debut at the showroom in 1944. The Mary Kaye Trio performed at the Hotel Last Frontier for approximately three years, starting in 1950. The Ramona Room had already been booked by other acts over the next six months, so a stage was added to a bar area for the trio to perform. They became the first lounge act to perform in Las Vegas, popularizing the concept.

The New Frontier addition in 1955 included a restaurant and showroom known as the Venus Room. A new Venus Room, with seating for 800, opened with the rebuilt Frontier in 1967. The new resort also included the 400-seat Post Time Theater. Elvis Presley made his Las Vegas debut at the New Frontier in 1956, but was poorly received. In the late 1950s, the New Frontier offered Holiday in Japan, a variety show featuring 60 performers from Tokyo.

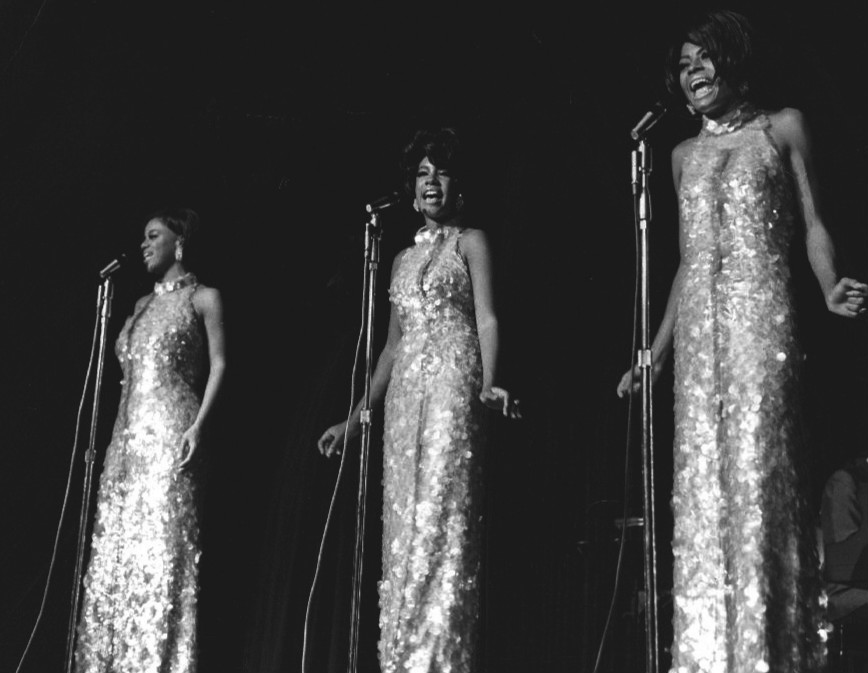
Diana Ross & The Supremes performing at the Frontier, 1969

Ronald Reagan entertained at the resort in the 1950s, as did Wayne Newton in the 1960s and 1970s. Other entertainers included Robert Goulet, Jimmy Durante, George Carlin, Ray Anthony, and Phil Harris.

Diana Ross & The Supremes gave their final performance in 1970, at the Frontier. Their performance was recorded for the album Farewell. In the early 1970s, the Frontier hosted the Miss Rodeo America pageant. Siegfried & Roy performed in Beyond Belief, a magic show that opened in 1981. It ran for 3,538 performances over a period of nearly seven years. When the Elardi family took over ownership in the late 1980s, they closed the showroom. After years without live entertainment, Ruffin added a 284-seat venue in 2000.

One new show, Legends of Comedy, featured entertainers who impersonated comedians such as Rodney Dangerfield, Jay Leno, and Roseanne Barr. In 2001, the New Frontier launched Rock 'n' Roll Legends, featuring impersonator singers. Numerous other shows ran at the resort in the 2000s, including a magic act, the Thunder From Down Under male revue, and a Frank Sinatra tribute show. Female impersonator Kenny Kerr also had a musical dance show at the property.
