= El-Ad Group =

Real estate conglomerate based in Israel

- Type: Private
- Industry: Real estate development
- Headquarters: New York City
- Owner: Yitzhak Tshuva
- Website: EladGroup.com

The El-Ad Group is an American real estate development company based in Israel. The group controls many subsidiaries including El-Ad Properties, which is based in New York City, El-Ad National in Boca Raton, and El-Ad Canada, which is headquartered in Toronto. In 2016 they were ranked No. 6 by The Real Deal in a list of most prolific condo developers in New York City of all time, by sales volume.

Collectively, the El-Ad Group has owned, restored, and developed many landmarks across North America, including the historic Plaza Hotel, The Grand Madison, and the Metropolitan Life Insurance Company Tower in Manhattan, New York. The El-Ad Group was founded and is owned by Yitzhak Tshuva, an Israeli businessman.

== Subsidiaries ==
=== Middle East ===
Elad Hotels Ltd. took a controlling interest in the 6-hotel Sheraton Moriah Israel hotel chain.

=== North America ===
Elad Properties is a real estate developer based in New York City, with extensive holdings in the United States, primarily in New York City. The flagship property of Elad Properties is the Plaza Hotel on Central Park South, bought by ElAd affiliate CPS One LLC, and reopened March 1, 2008. ElAd Properties is run by CEO Udi Erez.

Established in 2004 to spearhead expansion into the southeast, El Ad National Properties began as an affiliation between El Ad Group Florida and El Ad Group Canada, and today runs properties in ten states with a focus on the south, the midwest, and northeastern United States. 55% of Elad National Properties' portfolio are rentals. Through a joint venture, El Ad National Properties controls Element National Management, a property management company.

In 2007, the company expanded its holding in Los Angeles, purchasing land between Beverly Hills and Westwood as part of a $330 million development deal. Miki Naftali, the former CEO, launched and guided Elad’s successful New York operation and its expansion across the country and around the globe. The highlight of Elad’s portfolio is New York’s Plaza Hotel. The storied landmark had a $450 million renovation.

Elad plans to expand The Plaza brand to cities around the world, including to Boston, Los Angeles, Paris, London, Tokyo, and Shanghai. Naftali is developing the last high-rise luxury condo on the Wilshire Corridor in Los Angeles and is planning a luxury high-rise in New York City designed by Daniel Libeskind. He brought Elad into Singapore by creating a major residential, commercial, retail and hotel complex designed by Sir Norman Foster. Naftali oversees Elad’s activities in other premier North American markets. Elad Canada’s residential and commercial developments are principally located in the Montreal, Toronto, and Ottawa areas and include more than 12,000 residential units, many in newly created attractive neighborhoods. It has over 6,000,000 square feet (560,000 m^{2}) of commercial, retail, and industrial space in Canada. Elad National has a growing presence in Florida, Texas, Maryland, North Carolina, South Carolina, Georgia, Michigan, Illinois, Indiana, and Massachusetts.

=== Far East ===
ElAd Group runs several joint ventures with local companies in India and Singapore. In 2007, Elad Far East was established via a partnership deal with China's Zeg Investments.

== Controversies ==
Elad's purchase of New York City's Plaza Hotel caused great controversy in 2004. But as the hotel was readied for an opening on March 1, 2008, The New York Times observed, Tshuva and Peter Ward, president of the New York's hotel workers' union, had reconciled their differences: "It was a big change from early 2005, when Mr. Ward vowed to block Mr. Tshuva's plans to convert most of the hotel into luxury condos and reconfigure some of its Edwardian public spaces into upscale shops, moves he contended would force union members out of work".

On May 15, 2007, the company announced plans to purchase the New Frontier Hotel and Casino on the Las Vegas Strip in Las Vegas with plans to raze the current structure and build a new resort to be branded as Las Vegas Plaza. It sold for a record $33 million per acre.

In August 2007, Elad Properties faced a lawsuit between itself and the Plaza Hotel & Casino owner, Tamares Group.

== Holdings ==
- 21 Astor Place
- Metropolitan Life Insurance Company Tower
- New Frontier Hotel and Casino
- O'Neill Building
- Olympic Village (Montreal)
- Plaza Hotel
- The Grand Madison
- Link REIT
