= Crown Las Vegas =

Las Vegas skyscraper

Coordinates: 36.140354°N 115.156868°W

- An artist's impression of the Crown once completed
- Interactive map of the Crown Las Vegas area
- Former names: Las Vegas Tower

General information
- Status: Cancelled
- Type: Hotel, Casino, Conference, Retail, Observation Tower
- Location: Las Vegas, Nevada, United States, 2600 Las Vegas Boulevard South
- Estimated completion: TBA
- Opened: Never opened
- Cost: US$5 billion
- Owner: Publishing and Broadcasting Limited

Height
- Antenna spire: 1,887 ft (575 m) (original proposal); 1,064 feet (324 m) (reduced height)

Technical details
- Floor count: 142

Design and construction
- Architect: Skidmore, Owings & Merrill
- Developer: Christopher Milam, IDM Properties

The Crown Las Vegas, previously known as the Las Vegas Tower, was a proposed supertall skyscraper that would have been built on the Las Vegas Strip in Winchester, Nevada. If built, the tower would have been 1,887 feet (575 m) tall, making it the tallest building in the United States and 5th tallest in the world. After two major redesigns, the project was cancelled in March 2008.

The Crown Las Vegas, as originally planned, would have consisted of a casino, a hotel and an observation deck. The tower would have been built on Las Vegas Boulevard on the former site of the Wet 'n Wild Water Park. The building's architect was Skidmore, Owings & Merrill. The cost of the project was estimated to be $5 billion, and its original completion date was set for 2014.

== History ==
Originally proposed as the "Las Vegas Tower", the name of the building changed when Publishing and Broadcasting Limited reached an agreement on May 31, 2007, with the tower's developers to invest money in the project and run its casino. As part of the agreement, the project was renamed Crown Las Vegas.

Crown Las Vegas was originally proposed to rise 1,887 feet (575 m) by Christopher Milam, a building developer from Texas. According to KLAS-TV in Las Vegas, the Federal Aviation Administration (FAA) was concerned with the proposed height, due to the tower's proximity to McCarran International Airport and Nellis Air Force Base. In November 2006, the FAA issued a "notice of presumed hazard" because the tower's location is 2.5 miles (4.0 km) north of McCarran Airport's runways.

The FAA stated that anything over 700 feet (210 m) on the site chosen for the tower would constitute an air hazard. On October 24, 2007, the FAA denied the project, deeming that the tower was a "hazard to aviation". As a result of the decision, Clark County code prohibited its construction at the proposed height. There were plans to resubmit the project, with a new height of 1,150 feet (351 m). However, on November 20, 2007, the FAA reached a final decision that no structure taller than 1,064 feet (324 m) would be approved in the site. Milam then resubmitted the project to the Clark County Planning Commission at the maximum height allowed by the FAA, and the tower was officially approved for construction on December 6, 2007, with a height of 1,064 feet (324 m).

There had been some speculation that Milam wanted to submit plans for the construction of a second, twin tower to also rise 1,064 ft (324 m). If constructed, the two Crown Las Vegas towers would have become the tallest twin towers in the Western Hemisphere. However, no official plans were ever released.

In March 2008, Crown chairman James Packer announced the project was cancelled and the site put up for sale.

Milam's two-year option expired in June 2008. Milam and his partners paid $67.1 million in nonrefundable deposits and fees to Archon between June 2006 and June 2008. In December 2008, Milam resubmitted another bid for the 27-acre (110,000 m^{2}) site which had now risen to $618 million, compared to $475 million for the last agreement. The arrangement called for him to submit a non-refundable $60 million deposit. He had a little over two years to complete the purchase and did not do so.

== See also ==
- Crown Casino, Melbourne
- List of tallest buildings in Las Vegas
- List of Las Vegas casinos that never opened
