= Publishing and Broadcasting Limited =

Australian media and gaming company

Publishing and Broadcasting Ltd
- Type: Public
- Traded as: ASX: PBL
- Industry: Media, gaming
- Predecessors: Nine Network; Australian Consolidated Press
- Founded: 1994
- Defunct: 10 December 2007
- Fate: Assets spun off
- Successors: Consolidated Media Holdings; Nine Entertainment; Crown Limited
- Headquarters: Sydney, New South Wales, Australia
- Key people: James Packer, Executive chairman John Alexander, CEO
- Products: TV stations Casinos
- Website: pbl.com.au (archived)

Publishing and Broadcasting Limited (PBL) was one of Australia's largest corporations. With interests primarily in media and gambling, for the entirety of its existence it was largely controlled by the Packer family.

== History ==
=== Predecessors ===
PBL originated with Australian Consolidated Press (ACP), established by media magnate Frank Packer, who inherited the media interests of his father Robert Packer, who died in 1934. In 1936, Packer merged with E.G. Theodore's Sydney Newspapers and Associated Newspapers to form Australian Consolidated Press. Frank Packer was chairman of ACP from 1936 until his death in 1974, when control of the company passed to his younger son Kerry Packer.

ACP was granted a broadcasting license in Sydney when television began in Australia in the 1950s. Its television station, TCN-9 in Sydney was the first station in Australia to go to air, launched 1956, by an announcement from Bruce Gyngell "Good evening, and welcome to television".

In 1960, it purchased GTV-9 Melbourne to form the first television network in Australia, the National Television Network, later to become the National Nine Network.

In 1987, Kerry Packer sold the Nine Network to Alan Bond for $1 billion, who then expanded the network to include QTQ-9 Brisbane and STW-9 Perth. Packer later bought the network back for half of what he sold it for in 1990.

=== Formation ===
Publishing and Broadcasting Limited was formed in 1994 as a holding company for Nine Network and Australian Consolidated Press. PBL registered Nine Films and Television, an in-house film and television production arm, in August of that year.

In the late 1990s PBL lost millions on a venture called Nine India. Its most tangible form was a branded block on two of the channels operated by Doordarshan. It planned to become a major player in Indian television, but by early in the next decade, the concept was dropped.

In 1999, Crown Casino and Entertainment Complex was bought by PBL, and the online division of PBL, ecorp was floated on the ASX. ecorp was later privatised and delisted from the Stock Exchange.

In 2002, PBL entered a deal with Prime Television, giving it an effective 50% stake in Prime NZ. Nine Film and Television began to theatrically release films which were distributed through Hoyts (then also owned by PBL and related companies). A joint venture with Macquarie Film Corporation generated capital for the production of these films. The first film released was Dirty Deeds in 2002. It was followed by Gettin' Square (with Working Title Australia and Mushroom Pictures) in 2003.

In 2004, PBL purchased the Burswood Casino in Perth, and a 50% stake in Hoyts Cinemas, along with West Australian Newspapers. Hoyts was previously owned by the Packer private company; Consolidated Press Holdings Ltd. It also sold Papua New Guinea's only television network, EM TV to Fiji Television.

=== Focus on gambling assets ===
On 18 October 2006, James Packer announced the sell-off of 50% of PBL's media interests for A$4.5 billion to focus on its gambling business. The sell-off included Nine Network and its 50 per cent interest in NineMSN.

PBL was involved in two casino projects in Macau: the $260 million Crown Macau, scheduled for completion in 2006–07, and the $1.4 billion City of Dreams. The projects are joint ventures with Melco International Development, a Macau company. In March 2006, PBL announced that it had spent US$900 million (A$1.2 billion) to purchase a casino sub-concession from Wynn Resorts that would give the Melco-PBL joint venture the right to conduct casino operations. PBL's commitment to these ventures is the biggest investment by an Australian company in the PRC to date.

Originally proposed as the "Las Vegas Tower", the name of the building changed when Publishing and Broadcasting Limited reached an agreement on 31 May 2007, with the tower's developers to invest money in the project and run its casino. As part of the agreement, the project was renamed Crown Las Vegas.

Crown Las Vegas was originally proposed to rise 1,888 feet (575 m) by Christopher Milam, a building developer from Texas. According to KLAS-TV in Las Vegas, the Federal Aviation Administration (FAA) was concerned with the proposed height, due to the tower's proximity to McCarran International Airport and Nellis Air Force Base. In November 2006, the FAA issued a "notice of presumed hazard" because the tower's location is 2.5 miles (4.0 km) north of McCarran Airport's runways.

In March 2011, Crown chairman James Packer announced the project was cancelled and the site put up for sale. Crown will continue its investment in the under-construction Fontainebleau Resort and Casino on the site next to the proposed Crown Las Vegas site.

=== Fate ===
The company demerged in late 2007, spinning out its gambling interests into Crown Limited. PBL was renamed Consolidated Media Holdings, a company ultimately acquired by News Limited in 2012.

== Former holdings ==
=== PBL Media ===
- Australian Consolidated Press
- carsales.com (41% stake)
- Ninemsn (50% stake)
- Sky News Australia (33% stake)
- Nine Network
  - TCN-9 Sydney
  - GTV-9 Melbourne
  - QTQ-9 Brisbane
  - NTD-8 Darwin
- NBN Television
- Acer Arena
- Ticketek

=== PBL Enterprises ===
- Foxtel (25% stake)
- Seek (25% stake)
- Premier Media Group (50% stake)
- Hoyts (50% stake)

=== Other ===
- Crown Casino, Melbourne
- Burswood Entertainment Complex, Perth
- Prime Television (50% stake) – Sold in 2006 to Sky Network Television
- Stake in EM TV, Papua New Guinea
