= Jackie Robinson (basketball, born 1955) =

American basketball player

Personal information
- Born: May 20, 1955 (age 71) Los Angeles, California, U.S.
- Listed height: 6 ft 6 in (1.98 m)
- Listed weight: 210 lb (95 kg)

Career information
- High school: Morningside (Inglewood, California)
- College: UNLV (1973–1978)
- NBA draft: 1978: 4th round, 67th overall pick
- Drafted by: Houston Rockets
- Playing career: 1978–1985
- Position: Small forward
- Number: 22, 9, 30, 8

Career history
- 1978–1979: Las Vegas Dealers
- 1979: Seattle SuperSonics
- 1980: Detroit Pistons
- 1981: Chicago Bulls
- 1981–1982: Maine Lumberjacks
- 1982–1983: Rapident Livorno
- 1983–1984: Maccabi Tel Aviv
- 1984–1985: Espanyol

Career highlights
- NBA champion (1979); Second-team Parade All-American (1973)
- Stats at NBA.com
- Stats at Basketball Reference

Jackie Lee Robinson (born May 20, 1955) is an American former professional basketball player. He played from 1978–1985 for multiple leagues, including the National Basketball Association (NBA).

== Career ==
A 6'6" small forward from UNLV, Robinson played in the NBA from 1979 to 1981 as a member of the Seattle SuperSonics, Detroit Pistons, and Chicago Bulls. He averaged 3.8 points per game in his NBA career and won an NBA championship with Seattle in 1979.

=== Retirement ===
Afterward, Robinson played five years in Europe, and upon retirement held executive positions in several Las Vegas companies that worked in retail, real estate, construction, credit, and the food and beverage industries. He was a one-time owner of the Las Vegas Silver Bandits of the defunct International Basketball League, and the Las Vegas Slam of the American Basketball Association.

By 2008, Robinson and real estate veteran Michael Bellon had teamed up to develop a multibillion-dollar project on Bulloch and Gaffin's property called Elysium. It called for condos and hotel rooms, a dome-covered ocean-beach swimming complex, and more. It was to be located on the southeast of the Las Vegas Strip.

Robinson is currently working to build the All Net Resort and Arena in Las Vegas, a $4 billion hotel, shopping, and arena complex that could attract an NBA expansion team to Nevada. The project was approved August of 2014, though it wouldn't be until March of 2017 that excavation of the site would begin. In 2017, the construction of an additional 63-story tower had been approved for the site. At which time Robinson said that his financing was “signed, done, sealed, delivered.” He also indicated construction would go vertical around late spring 2018. In July 2017, lawyers for Robinson’s group contradicted Robinson's statement that funding was secure, saying in court papers that “difficulties in funding” the project had sparked construction delays and shortly thereafter construction came to a complete halt. Since construction stopped some contractors have claimed in court filings that they are owed money. In late 2018 Robinson said a loan agreement had been made with The Bank of Qatar after the expansion plan was approved but this source of funding could not be confirmed at the time by journalists. The Las Vegas Review Journal said at the time, "Robinson, who initially planned to open his project in 2016, now expects to finish in 2021." with a quote from Robinson saying, "The project will get completed — 100 percent”. As of 2025 construction remains stalled.

== Career statistics ==
Legend
GP	Games played	GS	Games started	MPG	Minutes per game
FG%	Field goal percentage	3P%	3-point field goal percentage	FT%	Free throw percentage
RPG	Rebounds per game	APG	Assists per game	SPG	Steals per game
BPG	Blocks per game	PPG	Points per game	**Bold**	Career high
†	Won an NBA championship

=== NBA ===
==== Regular season ====
Year	Team	GP	GS	MPG	FG%	3P%	FT%	RPG	APG	SPG	BPG	PPG
1978–79†	Seattle	**12**		8.8	.463		.533	**1.6**	**1.1**	**.4**	.1	3.8
1979–80	Detroit	7		7.3	**.529**	.000	.818	.7	.0	**.4**	**.4**	**3.9**
1981–82	Chicago	3	0	**9.7**	.333	–	**1.000**	1.0	.0	.0	.0	3.3
Career		22	0	8.4	.463	.000	.700	1.2	.6	.4	.2	3.8
