= HWW Limited =

Australian data management company

- Formerly: Horan Wall and Walker
- Industry: Data management and enhancement
- Founded: 1974
- Founder: Philomena Horan; Stephen Wall
- Defunct: 2015
- Headquarters: Sydney, Australia
- Parent: Gracenote
- Website: www.hww.com.au

HWW was an Australian-based organisation which supplied television and movies metadata to a broad range of clients across new and traditional media including: online publishers, subscription television providers, IPTV providers, HbbTV providers and print publishers.

HWW data powered recording, navigation, discovery and recommendation functions across a range of devices and platforms including web, mobile and set top boxes. HWW was the official provider of Foxtel listings in Australia. Customers included Foxtel, Freeview, Samsung, Telstra and Beamly.

HWW also licenses its proprietary data management software, DataGenius, to operators internationally to customers including Integral and Multichoice.

== History ==
HWW was founded by Philomena Horan and Stephen Wall in 1974 and first traded as Horan and Wall, The Information Agency in Peter Day's Kirk Gallery in Surry Hills, Sydney. Their first client was the then new youth radio station 2JJ. It was here that the founders met Tony Walker and he soon joined the partnership. The partnership began to trade as Horan Wall and Walker in 1974. The proprietary limited company became known as HWW Limited when it was floated on the Australian Securities Exchange (ASX) in 1999. HWW was acquired by Mi9 under a scheme of arrangement in 2006 and was delisted from the ASX. HWW was purchased to support a focus on mobile content with HWW producing, aggregating and syndicating content to many of the major mobile carriers including Telstra, Optus and Vodafone. In October 2014, HWW was acquired from Mi9 by Gracenote.

HWW syndicated a range of national content including television listings, movies listings, live music listings, restaurant and bar listings, horoscopes and humour. HWW won the Foxtel EPG contract in 2004 and worked with the subscription television provider on the launch of its digital television service.

In 2014, HWW was the leading supplier of movies and television data in Australia. In October 2014, HWW was acquired by Gracenote. In 2015, the HWW brand was retired.

== Product ==
HWW's first content management system was called SPACE (Sales Prospects And Client Environment). It grew into the basis for handling all of the company's data and content in all of its content domains. After HWW was taken over by NineMSN it built its next content management system, DataGenius, to manage schedule and metadata for its Australian clients. Content editors used DataGenius to standardise and enhance TV and movie metadata for display across a wide range of platforms. The data provided to clients in the Australian market included features such as real times for accurate recording, which were specific to local time zones and locations with, at that time, 718 unique channels configurations across Australia, series linking, and unique episode and program IDs.

Before its sale to Gracenote, HWW licensed DataGenius to international subscription television operators, including Integral and Multichoice. Installed locally and managed by their teams in-house, DataGenius allows operators to control and manage the quality of their metadata in their own environment. DataGenius features include the ability to receive data from multiple sources, supports management of both bound and unbound data and language translation.
