= Nine Digital =

Australian digital media company

Nine Digital Pty Ltd
- Company type: Subsidiary
- Industry: Media
- Founded: 1997; 29 years ago
- Headquarters: Sydney, Australia
- Products: Television, Digital, Events
- Parent: Nine Entertainment Co. (2013–present)

Nine Digital Pty Ltd (formerly Mi9) is an Australian digital media company and subsidiary of Nine Entertainment Co.

== History ==

Ninemsn was originally formed in 1997 as a joint venture between Microsoft and PBL. The ninemsn website operated as the main website for the Nine Network and MSN in Australia.

The Ninemsn company was renamed Mi9 in 2013, and in October 2013, Microsoft sold its 50% stake in the company to Nine Entertainment. Mi9 was subsequently renamed Nine Digital.

== Services ==
=== 9Honey ===
Women's network 9Honey was launched as a fashion site in April 2015. Nine subsequently brought together several online brands under the a single women’s network called 9Honey in 2016. This change saw the fashion and beauty website rebranded as 9Style.

- 9Honey | Binge: a site concerning television, streaming media and literature. It produces book reviews through its Booktopia brand and podcasts including Honey Mums and What the F is for Dinner.
- 9Honey | Celebrity: an entertainment, pop-culture and celebrity news site.
- 9Honey | Coach: a health-focused motivational site.
- 9Honey | Homes: an interior design and home styling site.
- 9Honey | Kitchen: a culinary site including recipes and cooking tips and stories.
- 9Honey | Mums: a site aimed at mothers including stories and insights on parenting.
- 9Honey | Style: a beauty and fashion site formerly branded as simply 9Honey.
- 9Honey | Travel: a travel and tourism sight including stories and recommendations.
- 9Honey | You: a female empowerment and inspiration site aimed at assisting women to meet their goals.

=== 9Now ===
Catch-up service 9Now was launched in 2016, replacing previous catch-up service 9Jumpin.

=== 9Saver ===
9Saver is a joint-venture with RevTech Media and an online money-saving site.

=== Future Women ===
Future Women is a brand aimed at professional women through events and workshops, an on-platform community and journalism.

=== Nine.com.au ===
Formerly a joint venture with Microsoft, website Ninemsn was renamed nine.com.au in 2016.

=== Pedestrian Group ===
Pedestrian is a youth digital news and entertainment website based in Sydney. It is part of the larger Pedestrian Group, which itself is wholly owned by Nine Entertainment. As of March 2022 Pedestrian also owns the Australian brands Vice Media (Australia), Business Insider Australia, Gizmodo Australia, Refinery29, Lifehacker Australia, Kotaku, Pedestrian JOBS, and Openair Cinemas'.

=== Stan ===
Stan is a subscription streaming service established in 2015.

== Former services ==
=== CarAdvice ===
CarAdvice is Australia's largest independent automotive content publisher. Its sister publication is BoatAdvice. In 2020, Nine announced plans to phase out the CarAdvice brand in 2021 in order to focus on its Drive brand.

=== Find a Babysitter ===
Find a Babysitter is Australia's largest online babysitter website started by Delia Timms and Jeff Bonnes in 2005. The couple divested from the company after five years. The website subsequently came under the control of Nine Entertainment. Nine sold the website back to Timms and Bonnes in 2021.

=== RSVP ===
RSVP is an online dating service purchased by John Fairfax Media in 2005. It merged with Oasis Active in 2014, whose co-founders David Heysen and Daniel Haigh were subsequently brought on to manage the combined entity. Nine sold RSVP to Heysen and Haigh in 2021.
