= List of canceled Las Vegas casinos =

Over the years, there have been several casinos and resorts planned for the Las Vegas Valley that never opened. The stages of planning may have been by announcement, or a groundbreaking.

== Alon Las Vegas ==
A proposed luxury hotel and casino to be built on the Las Vegas Strip, on the former site of the New Frontier Hotel and Casino. The project was announced in 2015, but was put in doubt after James Packer's Crown Resorts announced, in late 2016, that it was suspending its involvement in the development. Packer was reportedly unable to raise sufficient development funds. Crown stated that it was halting the project and seeking to sell its investment. The remaining partner Andrew Pascal announced he was seeking other partners to proceed with the project. However in May 2017, the land went up for sale. Crown Resorts sold the 34.6 acre property of its majority-owned subsidiary Alon Las Vegas LLC to Wynn Resorts in January 2018 for $300 million.

== Beau Rivage ==
Steve Wynn, who had purchased and demolished the Dunes hotel-casino, had originally planned to build a modern hotel in the middle of a man-made lake. He later built the Bellagio with a man-made lake in the front of the hotel. The name was later used by Wynn for a resort built in Biloxi, Mississippi.

== Caribbean Casino ==
In 1988, a sign for a proposed casino was erected on a fenced vacant lot on Flamingo Road. Standing near the sign was a scale model galleon. For several years, that was all that stood on the property. The empty lot was the source of many jokes by the locals until the ship, which was later damaged by a fire started by a homeless person, was torn down in the 1990s and the lot became the site of the Tuscany Suites and Casino co-owned by Charles Heers, who has owned the property since the 1960s.

== Carnivaal ==
In 1989, the Radisson group proposed Carnivaal, a 3,376-room hotel next to the Dunes with an H-shaped hotel and a casino shaped like a Hershey's Kiss. Construction was first delayed from January 1990 to December 1990. The project was never built.

== Cascada ==
A proposed resort that was to have been built on the site of El Rancho Vegas. The parcel is now partially taken by the Hilton Grand Vacations Club and Las Vegas Festival Grounds.

== Countryland USA ==
A country music-themed resort was planned for construction of the site of the former El Rancho Hotel and Casino. For some years, the El Rancho sign stood with the words "Coming Soon - Future Home of Countryland USA."

== Craig Ranch Station ==
A Mediterranean-themed hotel-casino for North Las Vegas, proposed by Station Casinos in March 2000. The project faced opposition from nearby residents, which led to the proposed location being changed to a vacant property on the nearby Craig Ranch Golf Course. Residential opposition to the new location led to the project being rejected by the Nevada Gaming Policy Committee in March 2001. Station Casinos still had the option to develop the project on the initial site, but the project was cancelled entirely in July 2001, following a weak financial quarter for the company.

== Crown Las Vegas ==
Formerly known as Las Vegas Tower, the Crown Las Vegas was to have been a supertall skyscraper built on the former site of a Wet 'n Wild water park. In March 2008, the project was canceled and the property was put up for sale.

== Desert Kingdom ==
In 1993, ITT Sheraton acquired the Desert Inn casino, and announced plans to develop the large parking lot into a Balinese themed resort to complement the Desert Inn. The project was never developed and the Desert Inn closed in 2000 and demolished in 2001; the site is now the location of Wynn Las Vegas.

== DeVille Casino ==
After building the Landmark Hotel and Casino on Convention Center Drive and selling it to Howard Hughes, developer Frank Carroll built the DeVille Casino across the street from the Landmark at 900 Convention Center Drive in 1969. Chips were made for the casino (and are sought-after collectibles), but the casino never opened. The building was renovated in 1992 as a race book parlor named Sport of Kings which closed after nine months. It became the location of The Beach nightclub, which was demolished in 2007 to make room for a planned 600-unit tower that was never built. The land sits currently empty.

== Echelon Place ==
An announced project by Boyd Gaming planned to have a hotel built on the property of the former Stardust Resort & Casino. Construction was suspended on August 1, 2008 due to the Great Recession. In March 2013, Boyd Gaming sold the proposed site for $350 million to the Genting Group, which redeveloped the project as the Asian-themed Resorts World Las Vegas, which had its grand opening in 2021.

== Harley-Davidson Hotel and Casino ==
A resort themed after the motorcycle manufacturer Harley-Davidson was proposed, complete with hotel towers shaped like gigantic exhaust pipes, but was never built.

== Hollywood Hotel ==
The Hollywood Hotel was announced in 1944. The hotel was to be built at an unspecified location two miles outside the city and would have included a helicopter pad and runway. Architects were Wurdeman & Becket. The Hollywood Hotel would have consisted of a group of two- and three-unit bungalows organized around a semicircular road with a main building in the center.

== Jockey Club Casino ==
The Jockey Club is a condominium and timeshare resort at 3700 Las Vegas Boulevard South. It was planned to have a casino, and chips were made for its use, but the casino was never opened.

== Kactus Kate's ==
By April 1994, Gold Coast Hotel and Casino owner Michael Gaughan was interested in building a hotel-casino in North Las Vegas, at the northeast corner of North Rancho Drive and Carey Avenue. In January 1995, the city planning commission approved the rezoning of the land for use as a hotel-casino. The resort, to be named Kactus Kate's, would be built by Gold Coast Hotel/Casino Limited. The hotel would include 450 rooms, and the casino would be 105,000 sq ft (9,800 m^{2}), later decreased to 102,000 sq ft (9,500 m^{2}). The resort would be located directly north of the nearby Fiesta and Texas Station resorts.

In December 1998, Coast Resorts, Inc. received approval from the planning commission for a use-permit relating to the undeveloped property. In November 2000, the planning commission unanimously approved a two-year extension on the permit, giving the company more time to decide whether it would build Kactus Kate's. Because of a 1999 Senate bill that placed restrictions on casinos in neighborhoods, Coast Resorts had a deadline of 2002 to build the casino. The hotel would measure over 100 feet (30 m) high, and Coast Resorts was required to notify the Federal Aviation Administration of its final plans, due to the site being located less than 1,000 feet (300 m) from a runway at the North Las Vegas Airport. In January 2001, Station Casinos purchased the 29-acre (12 ha) site for $9 million. Coast Resorts president Harlan Braaten said, "As we saw the competitive nature of that area intensify, in terms of the size of competing facilities, we just felt we would have to build something much bigger than we had intended to compete with Texas Station and Santa Fe Station. It was just going to be a very expensive project, and we didn't feel the returns would be that good." Station Casinos planned to sell the property as a non-gaming site.

== London Resort and Casino ==
This announced project was to have been themed around the city of London, and featuring replicas of the city's landmarks. The project was to be built on land across from the Luxor Hotel and Casino. A second London-themed resort was to be built on the former land of the El Rancho Hotel and Casino. Neither project ever began construction.

== London, Las Vegas ==
This was a proposed three-phase project using London as its design inspiration. When completed, the 38.5-acre (15.5 ha) property would have featured 1,300 hotel rooms, a casino, a 500-foot-tall (152.4 m) observation wheel named Skyvue (partially constructed), and 550,000 square feet (51,097 square meters) of restaurants and shops — all of which would be architectural replicas of various British landmarks and neighborhoods. The project was to be constructed on land across from the Mandalay Bay Hotel and Casino on the Las Vegas Strip, where, as of April 2026, the partially constructed Skyvue still stands. The wheel was to be "Phase I of London, Las Vegas". In May 2026, the nearly 1200-acre property was sold to a Nevada real estate developer.

== Montreux ==
Montreux would be a $2 billion resort with 2,750 rooms, based on the Swiss town of the same name. Phil Ruffin, owner of the New Frontier Hotel and Casino on the Las Vegas Strip, announced the Montreux in April 2006. It was to replace the Frontier, although Ruffin sold the resort in 2007. El Ad Properties purchased the Frontier and planned to build the Plaza on the property, but the project was later canceled.

== Moon Resort and Casino ==
Proposed by Canadian developer Michael Henderson, this is a planned 10,000-room, 250-acre (1.0 km^{2}) lunar-themed casino resort. Gaming experts doubt it will ever be built in Las Vegas, simply because the space planned for it is too large for the Las Vegas Strip.

== NevStar 2000 ==
Proposed by NevStar Gaming in 1998, the NevStar 2000 entertainment complex in North Las Vegas would have included a hotel and casino, but the project faced opposition from nearby residents who did not want a casino in the area. The project was cancelled when NevStar Gaming filed for bankruptcy in December 1999.

== New Horizon Hotel ==
The New Horizon was planned in 1945 and was named the Nevada Desert Inn originally. The hotel was designed by Adrian J. Wilson and Thornton M. Abell, and in November 1945 a two-page feature on the project appeared in Architectural Forum. In April 1946, Frank Sinatra became an investor, and by this time Paul R. Williams was named as the architect. The hotel campus would have included a radio studio from which Sinatra would broadcast. Later, Bing Crosby became an investor. After three lawsuits between 1946 and 1949, the project was dropped.

== North Coast/Boyd Gaming project ==
In May 2003, Coast Casinos had plans for the North Coast hotel-casino, to be built at the southwest corner of Centennial Parkway and Lamb Boulevard in North Las Vegas. The project would be built on approximately 40 acres (16 ha) of vacant land, surrounded by other land that was also undeveloped. At the time, the North Las Vegas Planning Commission was scheduled to review requests for zoning changes and approvals for the project. The project was not scheduled to be built for at least another four years, after completion of a highway interchange at Lamb Boulevard and the nearby Interstate 15, as well as the completion of an overpass over nearby railroad tracks. Bill Curran, an attorney for the land owner, said, "We're going through the zoning changes now so everybody knows what's going to be out there." The North Coast would include a casino, a 10-story hotel with 398 rooms, a bowling alley, movie theaters, and a parking garage. In June 2003, the Planning Commission voted 6 to 1 to approve preliminary applications necessary to begin work on the North Coast.

Boyd Gaming, the owner of Coast Casinos, announced in February 2006 that it would purchase the 40-acre site for $35 million. Jackie Gaughan and Kenny Epstein were the owners at the time. Boyd Gaming had not decided on whether the new project would be a Coast property or if it would be similar to the company's Sam's Town hotel-casino. At the time, no timetable was set for building the project. In March 2007, the project was put on hold. At the time, Boyd Gaming had been securing construction permits for the project but decided to first review growth in the area. Construction had been scheduled to begin in mid-2007. In August 2013, Boyd Gaming sold the undeveloped property for $5.15 million.

== Palace of the Sea Resort and Casino ==
This was to have been built on the former Wet 'n Wild waterpark site. Conceptual drawings included yacht-shaped towers that housed suites, a casino resembling the Sydney Opera House and a 600-foot (180 m) tall Ferris wheel-type attraction dubbed a "Sky Wheel". It never left the planning stages.

== Paramount Las Vegas ==
A casino and hotel and condo resort with more than 1,800 units that was planned by Royal Palms Las Vegas, a subsidiary of Royal Palms Communities. The project was to replace the Klondike Hotel and Casino at the south end of the Las Vegas Strip, beside the Las Vegas welcome sign. The resort was approved in October 2006, but an investor pulled out of the project in August 2007, and the land was put up for sale in May 2008.

== Pharaoh's Kingdom ==
Pharaoh's Kingdom was planned as a $1.2 billion gaming, hotel and theme park complex to be built on 710 acres (290 ha) at Pebble Road and Las Vegas Boulevard, five miles south of the Las Vegas Strip. Construction was approved in October 1988, with Silano Development Group as the developer.

The project would have an Egyptian theme, including two 12-story pyramids made of crystal, with each containing 300 suites. The hotel would have a total of 5,000 rooms, making it the largest in the world. The 230,000 sq ft (21,000 m^{2}) casino would include 100 table games and 3,000 slot machines, while an RV park, mini-golf, a bowling alley, and a video game arcade would be located beside the casino area. Three of the project's various pyramid structures would house the 50-acre (20 ha) family theme park. Other features would include sphinxes, man-made beaches, waterways resembling the Nile river, an underwater restaurant, a 24-hour child-care facility, a 100-tenant shopping promenade, and a repertory-style theater that would be overseen by actor Jack Klugman. Additionally, the resort would feature an 18-hole PGA Championship golf course, and a monorail located within the theme park. The project would have one mile of frontage along Las Vegas Boulevard.

Frank Gambella, president of the project, stated that financing was in place, with groundbreaking planned for March or April 1989. Gambella said the project would be financed by several entities, with the money coming from a Nevada corporation, suggesting the entities would be grouped together as an umbrella corporation. Gambella stated that the project could be opened by Labor Day 1990. The resort was expected to employ 8,000 people. Following the completion of the resort, Gambella said a complex of 750 condominiums would be built on the land along with 900 retirement-care apartments.

The project was cancelled shortly after it was announced, as authorities became suspicious of developer Anthony Silano's fundraising efforts for the project. It was discovered that Silano and his associates hacked into the Switzerland bank accounts of Philippine president Ferdinand Marcos following his death in 1989. Silano pleaded guilty to federal conspiracy charges. Another Egyptian-themed resort, Luxor Las Vegas, would open on the south Las Vegas Strip in 1993.

== Planet Hollywood Resort (original plans) ==
Originally planned to open in the late 1990s on the site of the Desert Inn, it was to be one of the largest hotels in Las Vegas. Because of the bankruptcy of Planet Hollywood Restaurants, the hotel was never built. However, in the 2000s, a group of investors bought the new Aladdin Hotel and Casino and remodeled it with a modern Hollywood theme.

== Playboy Hotel and Casino ==
A proposed casino resort themed after Playboy magazine was rejected in favor of a nightclub and suites built at the top two floors of the new Palms tower. The planned location for the Playboy Hotel and Casino, on the Las Vegas Strip, was later used for the Cosmopolitan resort.

== Plaza ==
In 2007, El Ad Properties purchased the New Frontier Hotel and Casino on the Las Vegas Strip. The company owned the Plaza Hotel in New York City, and announced plans to build a Las Vegas version on the Frontier property. The resort would cost at least $5 billion, and include a 175,900 sq ft (16,340 m^{2}) casino. The property would have seven high-rise towers with a total of 4,100 hotel rooms and 2,600 condominium units. The resort would also include retail and convention space, numerous restaurants, and a 1,500-seat theater.

The Plaza Hotel & Casino in downtown Las Vegas filed a lawsuit against El Ad later in 2007. The suit expressed concern about possible confusion as a result of two Plaza resorts competing in the same city. El Ad prevailed a year later, winning the right to use the Plaza name for its Las Vegas resort. In a separate case, broker David Atwell sued El Ad alleging that he was owed a fee for initiating the Frontier sale; they eventually settled in 2008.

The Plaza was not scheduled to open until at least 2011. El Ad pushed this back a year, announcing in 2008 that the start of construction would be delayed because of financing difficulties. The project was canceled in 2011. Crown Resorts bought the land three years later, and announced plans to build Alon Las Vegas, another resort that would be canceled.

== San Francisco projects ==
There have been three proposed San Francisco-themed resorts for Las Vegas, including one planned for the site of the Silver City casino. None of the projects began construction.

=== Mark Advent ===
In June 1997, Las Vegas developer Mark Advent announced plans for the San Francisco Hotel & Casino, to be developed with a partner. Designed by Thalden Entertainment Architects, the exterior would replicate notable buildings from the San Francisco skyline, such as the Transamerica Pyramid. It would consist of nine towers, some rising as high as 70 stories. It would include at least 2,000 rooms and a 90,000 sq ft (8,400 m^{2}) casino. Advent had developed the recently opened New York-New York resort on the Strip. For the San Francisco project, he had three potential sites in mind, including one south of the Jockey Club timeshare on the Strip. Harveys considered partnering on the project, but later dropped out. Gaming executives were skeptical that the $500 million project would materialize, in part because of the high cost of the Strip land.

The project costs increased to nearly $1 billion in 1998, as features were added or increased. The property would include a steel-framed hillside, rising at least 20 stories and looking over a five-acre version of the San Francisco Bay. The hillside would include replicas of San Francisco landmarks such as Chinatown, Fisherman's Wharf, Washington Square, and the Palace of Fine Arts. Guests would enter by crossing a replica of the Golden Gate Bridge. Advent hoped to open the resort in 2001. He wanted a 20-percent stake in the project, but decided in 1998 to forego a partner and develop the project himself. In 1999, Advent renamed the project Frisco Bay and unveiled additional features of the resort, which he hoped to open in 2003. He sought to build the project on 32 acres next to the Desert Inn resort on the Strip, although the landowner eventually sold to another developer.

Advent sued Phil Ruffin in 2000, after the latter announced plans for his own San Francisco-themed resort. Advent said he had presented his plans to Ruffin in 1997, seeking him as a partner. He sued for $900 million in damages and sought to prevent Ruffin from proceeding with his project, stating that Ruffin stole the idea from him. Advent said that he conceived the idea for a San Francisco resort in 1995, predating Ruffin's own project by a year. Ruffin denied that he stole the idea, stating that such a concept is in the public domain.

=== Phil Ruffin ===
Ruffin announced his project, City by the Bay, in January 2000. The $700 million resort would replace his New Frontier hotel-casino on the Strip. Construction was scheduled to start later that year, with the opening expected in 2002. The resort would include 2,512 rooms and a 120,000 sq ft (11,000 m^{2}) casino, and feature replicas of Alcatraz Island, Fisherman's Wharf, Coit Tower, and Lombard Street. The project would also have a San Francisco Bay replica featuring boats, sea lions, and a wave-making machine, with guests entering over a Golden Gate Bridge replica. Another replica, depicting the San Francisco–Oakland Bay Bridge, would connect to the Fashion Show Mall south of the property. The project was designed by Joel Bergman, who Ruffin said had never seen any of Advent's renderings. Singer Robert Goulet was in early discussions to perform at the resort. However, Ruffin had difficulty acquiring financing for the project. Ruffin canceled the project in favor of the Swiss-themed Montreux, which was also eventually cancelled.

== Santa Fe Valley ==
Santa Fe Gaming, which owned the Santa Fe hotel-casino in northwest Las Vegas, had plans for a second Santa Fe property in 1996. The Santa Fe Valley would be built on a 40-acre (16 ha) lot in Henderson, Nevada, adjacent to the Galleria at Sunset mall. The start of construction was delayed several times because of poor financial quarters for Santa Fe Gaming, and because of the company not yet receiving financing for the project. Site preparation started in July 1998, with an opening date scheduled for December 1999, but construction never began. In 1999, the property was sold to Station Casinos, which sold the land a year later for use as a shopping center.

== Shenandoah Hotel and Casino ==
A project by Wayne Newton. Although the hotel operated for a short time at 120 E. Flamingo Road, the management was unable to get a gaming license. After years of floundering it was sold to a Canadian company and became Bourbon Street Hotel and Casino.

== Silver City proposals ==
By January 2000, Luke Brugnara was planning to build a San Francisco-themed resort on the site of the closed Silver City Casino. Brugnara intended to give Silver City a multimillion-dollar renovation, with plans to have a fully operational hotel-casino by 2002. In March 2001, Brugnara's request for a gaming license was rejected. In May 2002, it was announced that Brugnara had sold the casino while retaining six acres located behind the building. In 2003, Brugnara was planning to build a 24-story, 304-room hotel and casino resort on a portion of the Silver City property. The resort, to be named "Tycoon", was to be designed by Lee Linton, with an expected cost of approximately $100 million.

== Southern Highlands ==
The Southern Highlands resort was planned for the community of the same name, south of the Las Vegas Strip. The project was announced by Olympia Gaming in October 2005. Construction of the $1 billion project was scheduled to begin in summer 2007, with the first phase scheduled to open by fall 2009. The resort was to include 1,400 hotel rooms. In May 2007, it was announced that the resort would include a 300,000 sq ft (28,000 m^{2}) shopping mall, the Gallery Southern Highlands. The entire project was delayed in August 2007, because of uncertainty in the financial markets. It remains unbuilt.

== Southstar ==
In March 1987, a consortium led by a former head of Caesar's Palace announced a $750 million dollar project of ten hotels around one casino with a total of 6,000 hotel rooms was proposed south of the Hacienda Hotel. Southstar Development Corp. had agreements with different national hotel chains to build separate hotels in 1987 with the groundbreaking set for fall, with full buildout to be complete by 1990. However, the October 1987 stock market slump caused the project's postponement. The corporation bought the land adjacent to the Hacienda from Howard Hughes. In mid-1988, the Indiana-based Simon & Associates purchased the project and announced the project was "on track". The project was never built.

== Starship Orion ==
International Thoroughbred Breeders (ITB) announced plans to demolish the El Rancho and construct Starship Orion, a $1 billion hotel, casino, entertainment and retail complex with an outer space theme, covering 5.4 million square feet (501,676 square meters). The resort was to include seven separately owned casinos, each approximately 30,000 square feet (2,787 square meters). Each potential casino owner was to contribute up to $100 million to own and operate a casino within the complex. The complex would have included 300,000 square feet (27,871 square meters) of retail space, as well as 2,400 hotel rooms and a 65-story hotel tower. ITB hoped to begin construction later in 1996, with a planned opening date of April 1998.

== Sunrise ==
This was to have been located at 4575 Boulder Highway. Property developer Michael Mona Jr. built the hotel-casino and stated that he was going to break tradition by starting a "casino without a theme". He failed to get an unrestricted gaming license when suspicions arose concerning his associations with alleged organized crime figures. Chips were made for the casino, but were never used. The building was opened as Arizona Charlie's Boulder.

== Titanic ==
In 1999, Bob Stupak was planning a 400-foot-high (122 m) resort themed after the RMS Titanic, to be built on a 10-acre (4 hectares) property he owned near downtown Las Vegas. The resort would have included 1,200 rooms, 800 of which were to be used for timeshares to help finance the project. That year, planning commissioners rejected Stupak's request to change the zoning to allow for a hotel. The project was later planned for the former site of the El Rancho Vegas on the Las Vegas Strip, but was rejected by the Las Vegas City Council.

== Victoria Bay ==
Victoria Bay was planned by Steve Wynn until it was cancelled in 1981, because of high costs. It would have been built on the Las Vegas Strip. It was initially planned for the site that would later become occupied by the Excalibur Hotel and Casino. Wynn later wanted to build it near the Sahara and Silverbird.

== Viva ==
In 2005, Station Casinos started purchasing land next to the Wild Wild West Gambling Hall & Hotel it already owned. While no specific plans have been announced, it is widely expected that this move means that a major redevelopment is planned at this location.

According to an article in Forbes, the site has evolved to nearly 1/2-square-mile or 110 acres (45 ha) at a cost of $335 million. With a working title of Viva, the three casino, hotel condo arena project would wind up costing $10 billion.

== W Las Vegas ==
W Las Vegas was proposed in August 2005, as a $1.7 billion joint project between Starwood and Edge Resorts, with a scheduled opening in 2008. The project would include a 75,000 sq ft (7,000 m^{2}) casino and approximately 3,000 hotel, condo hotel, and residential units. The project was cancelled in May 2007, after Starwood pulled out of the deal.

== Wally's Wagon Wheel ==
Wally's Wagon Wheel was to be developed by Walter Weiss through his company, Magna Leisure Partnership. The project was proposed for 2200 South Boulder Highway in Henderson, between Wagon Wheel Drive and Roberts Road, near Henderson's Old Vegas western theme park. Manga Leisure Partnership purchased the 15.5-acre property in late February 1988. Weiss, at that time, had tentative plans for a western-themed, 112-room property known then as the Wagon Wheel Hotel and Casino. The Wagon Wheel was expected to cost $15 million, and financing had yet to be obtained for the project, which Weiss expected to open in early 1990. The project, which would include a 55,000 sq ft (5,100 m^{2}) casino, was to be built in two phases.

By October 1991, Wally's Wagon Wheel remained unbuilt due to difficulty obtaining financing. That month, the Henderson Planning Commission voted to give Weiss more time to make progress on the project. At that time, the project was to include 204 hotel rooms and would be built on 13.30 acres (5.38 ha). Weiss noted that the nearby successful Sam's Town hotel-casino opened with 204 rooms, and he believed his project would be successful if he opened with the same amount of rooms for good luck. By the end of 1992, Weiss had still not acquired financing for Wally's Wagon Wheel. At the time, the project was the largest of five casinos being planned for Henderson. The three-story project was to include 200 rooms, two restaurants, a theater lounge for country and western entertainment, and a large bingo room. Weiss stated that groundbreaking was scheduled for May 1993, with an expected opening in June 1994. The hotel-casino would employ approximately 600 people upon opening.

Weiss met with nearby residents to discuss the project, and he had the original design changed to include a larger buffer zone between homes and the hotel-casino. In November 1994, the Henderson Planning Commission voted to recommend approval of Weiss' requested zone change as part of the redesign. The project, at that time, was to include a one-story casino and a four-story hotel with 400 rooms. In December 1994, the Henderson City Council rejected Weiss' plans for a 200-foot (61 m) buffer.

In July 1997, the unbuilt project received its sixth extension from the Henderson Planning Commission for a use permit and architectural review. In August 1997, the Henderson City Council approved the sixth extension, but denied Weiss' appeal for a one-year extension, instead giving him six months to make progress on the project. Up to that time, $1.7 million had been invested in the project by Magna Leisure Partnership. As of 1998, the project was expected to cost $80 million and employ at least 1,200 people, and the proposed site had increased to 19 acres (7 ha). At that time, Weiss stated that he was close to obtaining financing for the project from a casino operator. The project was never built.

== Wild Wild West ==
As of 1993, Station Casinos owned a 27-acre (11 ha) site on Boulder Highway with the potential to be developed as a casino. The site was located across the street from Sam's Town hotel-casino. In January 1998, Crescent Real Estate Equities Co. announced plans to purchase Station Casinos, which had intended to sell the land prior to the announcement. By March 1998, Station Casinos was planning to develop a hotel-casino complex on the land, which was occupied by a vacant strip mall. The complex would be known as Wild Wild West, with local residents as the target clientele.

Crescent's purchase of Station Casinos failed in August 1998, and Station Casinos subsequently slowed its plans to build the project. By the end of the year, the project had received approval from the Clark County Planning Commission for a 273,000 sq ft (25,400 m^{2}) casino and a 504-room hotel. No timetable for construction was announced, and Station Casinos had already decided by that point not to start any new projects prior to 2000. Station Casinos sold the undeveloped land for $11.2 million to Wal-Mart Stores, Inc. in April 2004.

== World Port ==
In 2000, Howard Bulloch, David Gaffin, and their partner Tom Gonzales transferred ownership of the Glass Pool Inn property to their group, known as New World, with plans for a megaresort. New World purchased several other nearby motels to accumulate a 77-acre (31 ha) parcel located on the Las Vegas Strip and east of the Mandalay Bay. In January 2001, plans were announced for World Port Resorts, a megaresort consisting of hotel-casinos, a convention center and a fine arts facility. The project was to be built on the 77-acre (31 ha) property, a portion of which was occupied by the Glass Pool Inn.

== World Trade Center ==
To have been located at 925 East Desert Inn Road. Leonard Shoen, co-founder of U-Haul truck rental, purchased the property of what had been the Chaparral Hotel & Casino in 1996, renovating it into the World Trade Center Hotel. A gaming license was applied for, but when it was discovered that two of Shoen's closest partners were convicted felons, the application was denied in 1998. He withdrew his application, and died in a car crash in 1999 that was ruled a suicide. Cards and gaming chips were produced for the World Trade Center Casino, but were never used. The property has since been demolished and is now a parking lot, part of the Las Vegas Convention Center Annex.

== World Wrestling Federation ==
A casino resort themed after the World Wrestling Federation (WWF) was proposed for a property near the Interstate 15 freeway across from Mandalay Bay. The project never went past the proposal stage. The land where it would have stood is now Allegiant Stadium.

WWF also proposed to open the project on the property once used by the Clarion Hotel and Casino, which was demolished in 2015 to become a parking lot.

== Wynn West ==
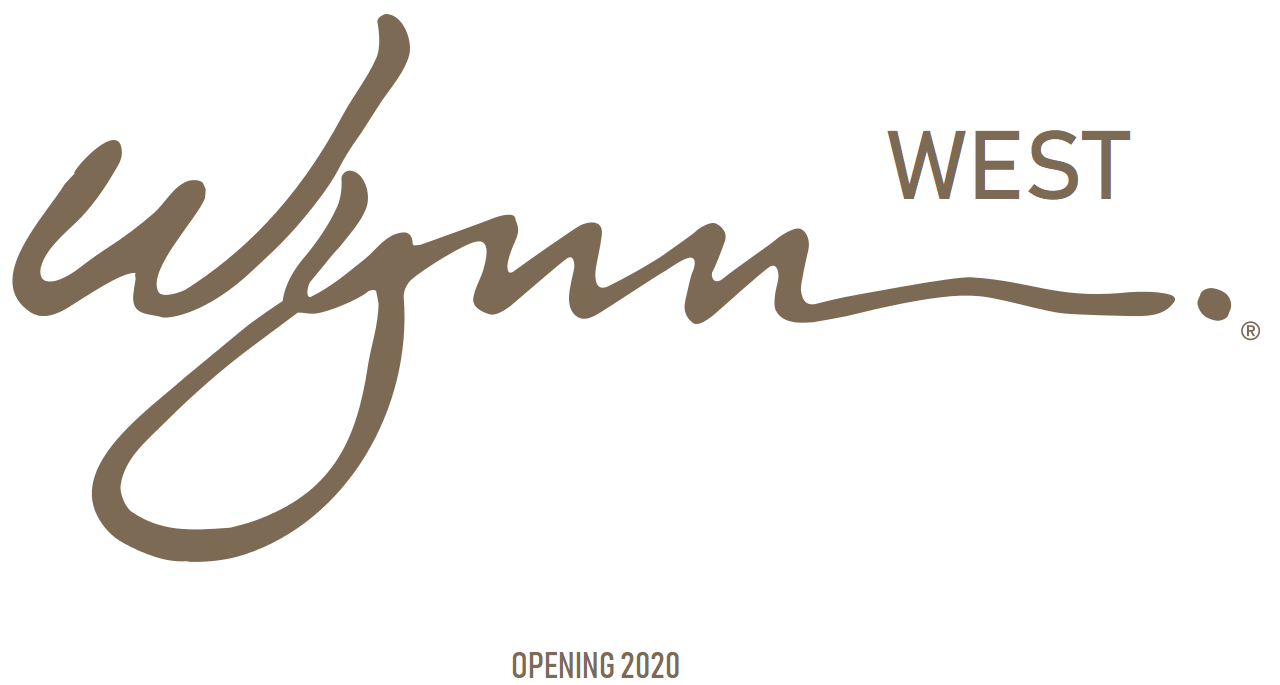
Wynn West logo, advertising a planned 2020 opening

In early 2018, Wynn Resorts bought the site of the former New Frontier Hotel and Casino, located across the street from its Wynn and Encore properties. The company planned to build a new casino resort, Wynn West, to complement the existing properties. It would include between 2,000 and 3,000 rooms. However, CEO Steve Wynn resigned from the company shortly after the land purchase, following sexual misconduct allegations against him. Matt Maddox took over as CEO, and plans for Wynn West were canceled. As of 2025, Wynn Resorts still owns the land where Wynn West was to be built and still plans to develop the site.

== Xanadu ==
In February 1976, the Clark County Commission approved the 23-story Xanadu resort, to be built on the Las Vegas Strip at the corner of South Las Vegas Boulevard and Tropicana Avenue. The resort would include approximately 1,700 hotel rooms and a casino, as well as convention facilities, a showroom, dining, and indoor tennis courts. The resort was to be developed by Tandy McGinnis – of Bowling Green, Kentucky – and his Xanadu Corporation, and would be built on 48.6 acres (19.7 ha) owned by Howard Downes, a resident of Coral Gables, Florida. The Xanadu would feature a pyramid design, and was expected to cost $150 million. It would have been the first themed mega-resort. Much information and many artifacts of the project are housed at the University of Nevada, Las Vegas library. The Excalibur Hotel and Casino ultimately opened on the property in 1990.

== See also ==
- Category:Defunct casinos in the Las Vegas Valley
- List of Atlantic City casinos that never opened
