= Mershops Galleria at Sunset =

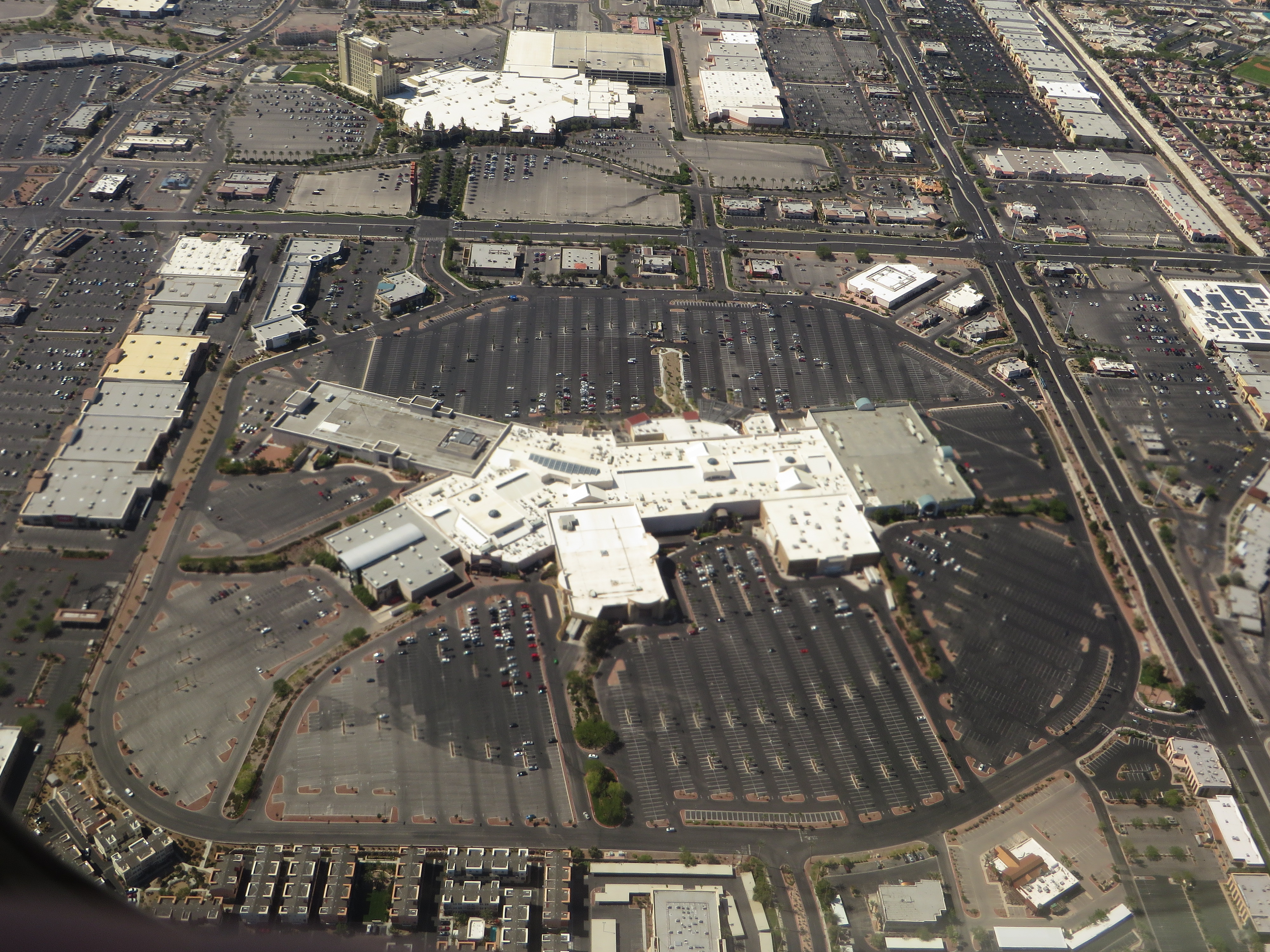
- Mershops Galleria at Sunset, 2015
- Location: Henderson, Nevada, United States
- Coordinates: 36°04′02″N 115°02′33″W
- Address: 1300 W. Sunset Road
- Opened: February 28, 1996; 30 years ago
- Previous names: Galleria at Sunset (1996 - 2025)
- Developer: Forest City Enterprises
- Manager: Spinoso Real Estate Group
- Owner: Mershops
- Num. of stores: 131
- Num. of anchor tenants: 5
- Floor area: 1,080,208 square feet (100,354.6 m^{2})
- Floors: 2
- Parking: 6,000 (1996)
- Website: www.galleriaatsunset.com

Mershops Galleria at Sunset (informally referred to as Galleria Mall) is an indoor shopping mall at 1300 West Sunset Road in Henderson, Nevada. It is owned by Mershops and managed by Spinoso Real Estate Group. Plans to build the mall were announced in 1987, but construction did not begin until 1995. It opened on February 28, 1996, and received its first major renovation in 2013, followed by an expansion which added several restaurants.

It is Henderson's first and only indoor mall, and one of four indoor malls in the Las Vegas Valley. It is also one of the largest malls in the state, with 1,080,208 square feet (100,354.6 m^{2}). Anchor tenants include Dick's Sporting Goods (formerly Galyan's), Dillard's, JCPenney, Kohl's (formerly Mervyn's), and Macy's (formerly Robinsons-May).

== History ==
=== Development and opening ===
In 1986, southern Nevada developer Leslie Dunn showed a group of prospective investors the vacant property that would eventually become the site of the Galleria at Sunset. Most of the investors joined Dunn to construct the mall, forming Ranch Property Development and partnering with Forest City Enterprises. Plans for the Ranch Mall were announced in 1987, and the name was changed two years later. James Heller was the architect, and early plans included a six-screen movie theater.

At one point, construction was set to begin in 1990, with the opening expected in 1992. However, the start of construction was delayed by the early 1990s recession. Construction eventually began in January 1995, and it spurred a period of rapid commercial development in the surrounding area, including the Sunset Station hotel-casino across the street.

The Galleria at Sunset was built at a cost of $150 million. It opened on the morning of February 28, 1996, as Henderson's first shopping mall. It was also the fourth indoor mall to open in the Las Vegas Valley. An estimated 12,000 to 15,000 people attended the opening. Shows starring Disney characters were staged around the Galleria as part of the opening celebration, and continued in the following days to promote the mall's Disney Store.

Approximately 300,000 people lived within a 10-mile radius of the Galleria, which planned to stage family-oriented activities throughout the year to appeal to those residents. The target clientele was females between the ages of 25 and 54, a demographic group that was prominent in Henderson. The mall had more than 2,000 employees. It partnered with Sunset Station in the late 1990s to offer "shop-and-stay" packages to visitors from out of town.

In 1997, there were plans for the Santa Fe Galleria Hotel to be built on property adjacent to the mall, with the two buildings being connected. The Galleria Mall partnered with Santa Fe Gaming to build an ice rink at the new casino, although both projects were later canceled.

=== 2000s ===
In 2002, the Galleria added 13 retailers in a $20 million expansion. The project included the addition of a new anchor tenant, Galyan's, marking its first store in the state. Galyan’s got acquired by Dick’s Sporting Goods in 2004, and therefore, the Galleria at Sunset Galyan’s location became a Dick’s Sporting Goods in 2004. In 2005, Robinsons-May was acquired by Macy’s which caused the Galleria at Sunset Robinsons-May location to be rebranded as Macy’s in 2006. Mervyn's closed in 2009, and became a Kohl's. Henderson Libraries opened a branch inside the mall later that year.

=== 2010s ===
The 2013 renovation included the addition of a two-floor H&M store, which was added due to popular demand. Other notable retailers have included Abercrombie & Fitch, Buckle, Coach, Forever 21, and Victoria's Secret.

In 2013, Queensland Investment Corporation acquired a 49 percent ownership stake in the mall. Forest City owns the remainder and manages the Galleria. A $7 million mall-wide remodeling project took place later in 2013. It was the mall's first major renovation since its opening in 1996. Expansion work took place from 2014 to 2015.

A $25 million expansion began in 2014, adding a new entrance and outdoor plaza. The expansion also added several new restaurants in 2015, including Bravo! Cucina Italiana. They joined two existing restaurants: Chevys Fresh Mex and Red Robin. Indoor palm trees and fountains were removed during the expansion, providing more room for shoppers and events. World of Beer opened a location at the mall in 2016, and a cereal eatery opened in 2019, offering 130 brands of cereal served in bowls and shakes.

=== 2020s ===
In 2024, the property was sold to Bridge Group Investments for an unknown price. In 2025, Galleria at Sunset rebranded as Mershops Galleria at Sunset because of Bridge Group Investments rebrand as Mershops, which was a portfolio wide change across all of their properties.

Renderings show on a post on their LinkedIn page show a potential renovation in the works, enhancing the exterior and the interior, as well as implementing the Mershops Galleria at Sunset signage. It was later confirmed that Mershops Galleria at Sunset will be renovated for the malls 30th anniversary to make the mall more of “a community driven space that blends commerce with experience.” Currently, its restaurant row has mostly been vacated with some exclusions (Red Robin, Cycle Gear, and D1 Sports Training) to make way for second generation restaurant spaces and for renovations which is currently going for a completion date of around 2028 or 2029.

== Features and tenants ==
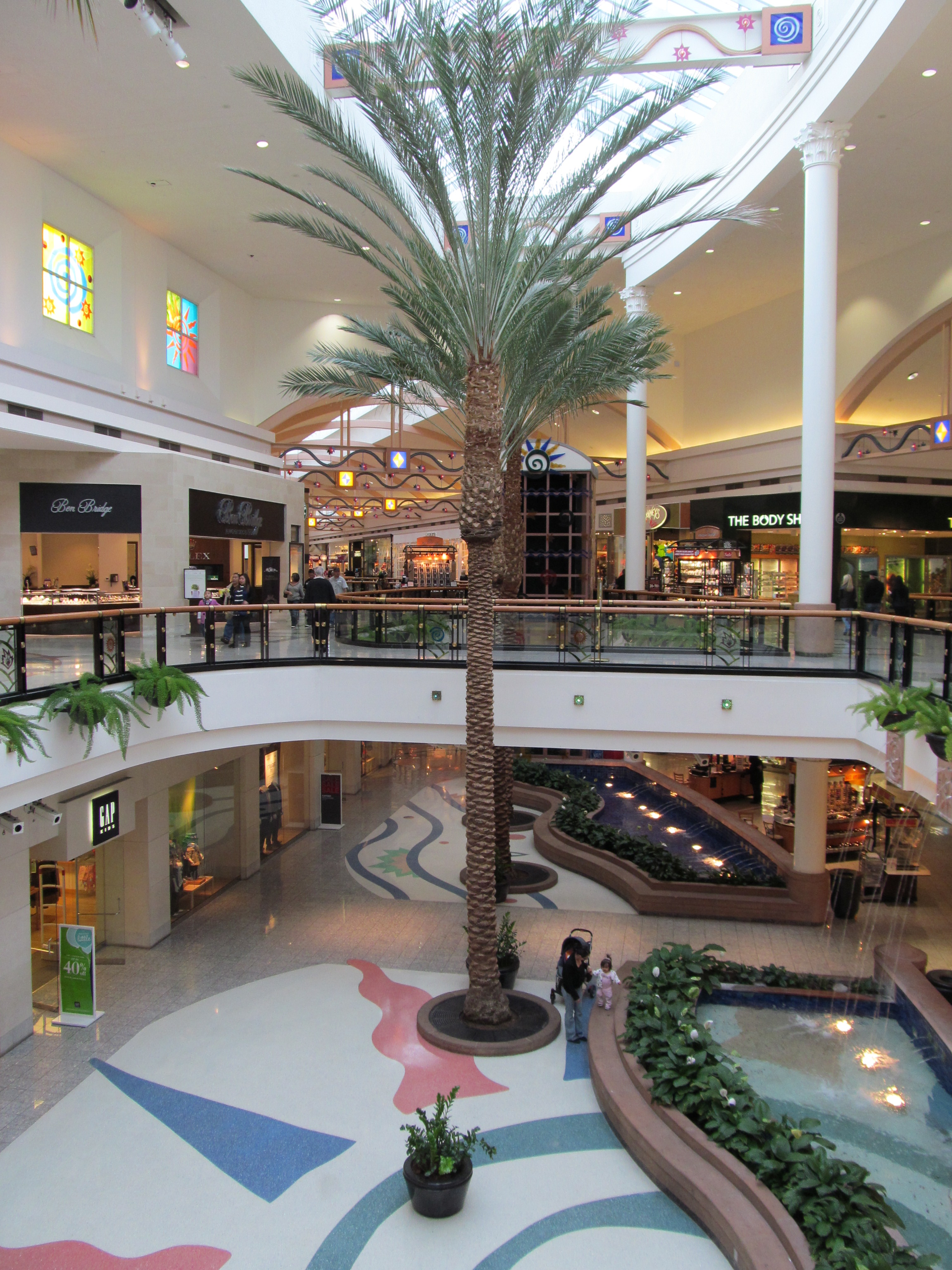
Mall interior in 2012, prior to renovations

The Galleria Mall contains 1,080,208 square feet (100,354.6 m^{2}). As of 2022, it has 131 stores, excluding 5 anchor tenants. It is located at 1300 West Sunset Road, west of the U.S. 95 Expressway.

The mall opened with 1,000,000 sq ft (93,000 m^{2}) and 114 stores, as well as 4 anchor tenants:

- Dillard's – 208,186 sq ft (19,341.1 m^{2})
- Robinsons-May – 180,000 sq ft (17,000 m^{2})
- J. C. Penney – 125,264 sq ft (11,637.4 m^{2})
- Mervyn's – 83,232 sq ft (7,732.5 m^{2}).

The mall initially had a southwestern theme and skylights. Frommer's described it as the "most aesthetically pleasing" of the Las Vegas Valley's malls. The 600-seat food court, decorated with chess-piece topiaries, included 12 eateries, such as Cinnabon, Dairy Queen, and Hot Dog on a Stick. The mall also had two full-service restaurants. The parking lot contained 6,000 spaces, and valet parking was offered at the time of the mall's opening.
