= Senator Weiner =

Senator Weiner may refer to:

- Charles R. Weiner (1922–2005), Pennsylvania State Senate
- Janice Weiner (born 1957), Iowa State Senate

== See also ==
- Senator Wiener (disambiguation)
