= South Wind Motel =

Motel in Columbus, Ohio, United States

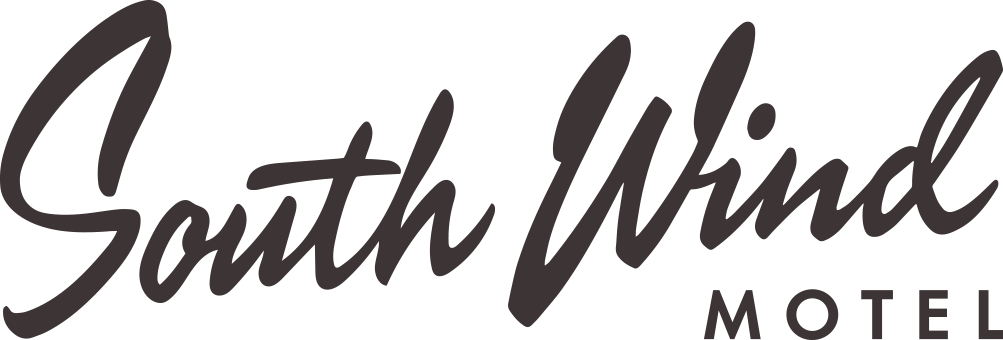

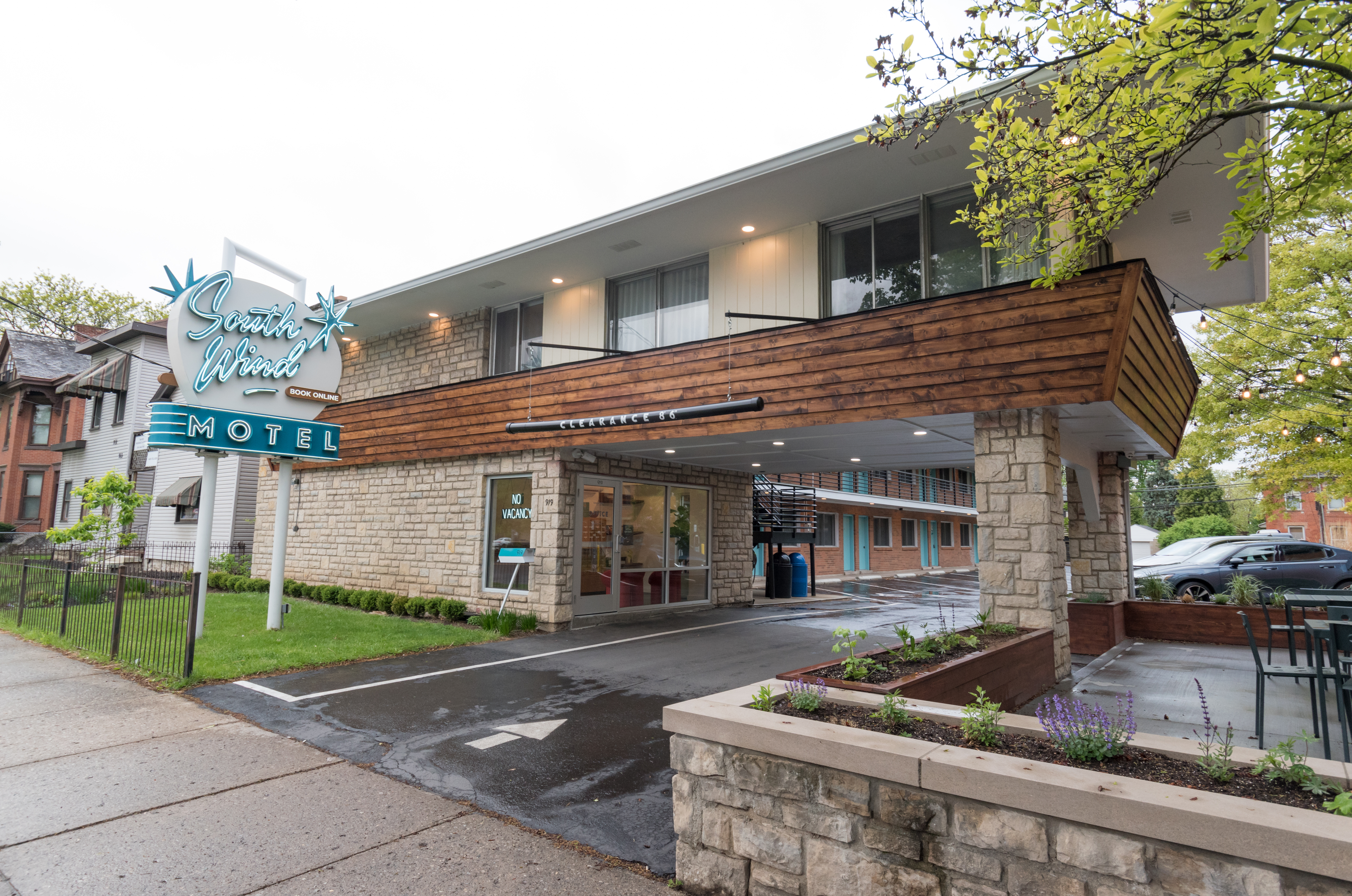
- Interactive map of the South Wind Motel area

General information
- Status: In use
- Location: 919 S. High Street, Columbus, Ohio
- Coordinates: 39°56′35″N 82°59′51″W
- Opened: 1959
- Renovated: 2021–2022

Design and construction
- Architect: Harold Schofield

Renovating team
- Renovating firm: The Kelley Companies

Other information
- Number of rooms: 22 (including 3 suites)
- Parking: Surface lot
- Public transit access: 5, 8

Website
- www.southwindstay.com

The South Wind Motel is a boutique motel in the Brewery District of Columbus, Ohio. The motel has a mid-century modern theme, replicating elements from around 1959, when the motel first opened. The building was designed by local architect Harold Schofield with inspiration from the Prairie School of architecture, and is one of few remaining commercial buildings in Columbus of its kind. Today, the hotel is independently operated, and has 19 rooms and 3 suites.

The hotel was completed in 1959, operating for decades in prosperity. Beginning in the late 20th century, the South Wind Motel began to take on a different clientele, and offered rooms by the hour. The site became known for drug dealing and crime. After a period of vacancy, a local developer purchased the hotel in 2021. Following an extensive renovation, it reopened in July 2022 as a boutique-style motel, with mid-century modern-styled decor, solar panels, electric vehicle charging, and other unique features.

== Attributes ==
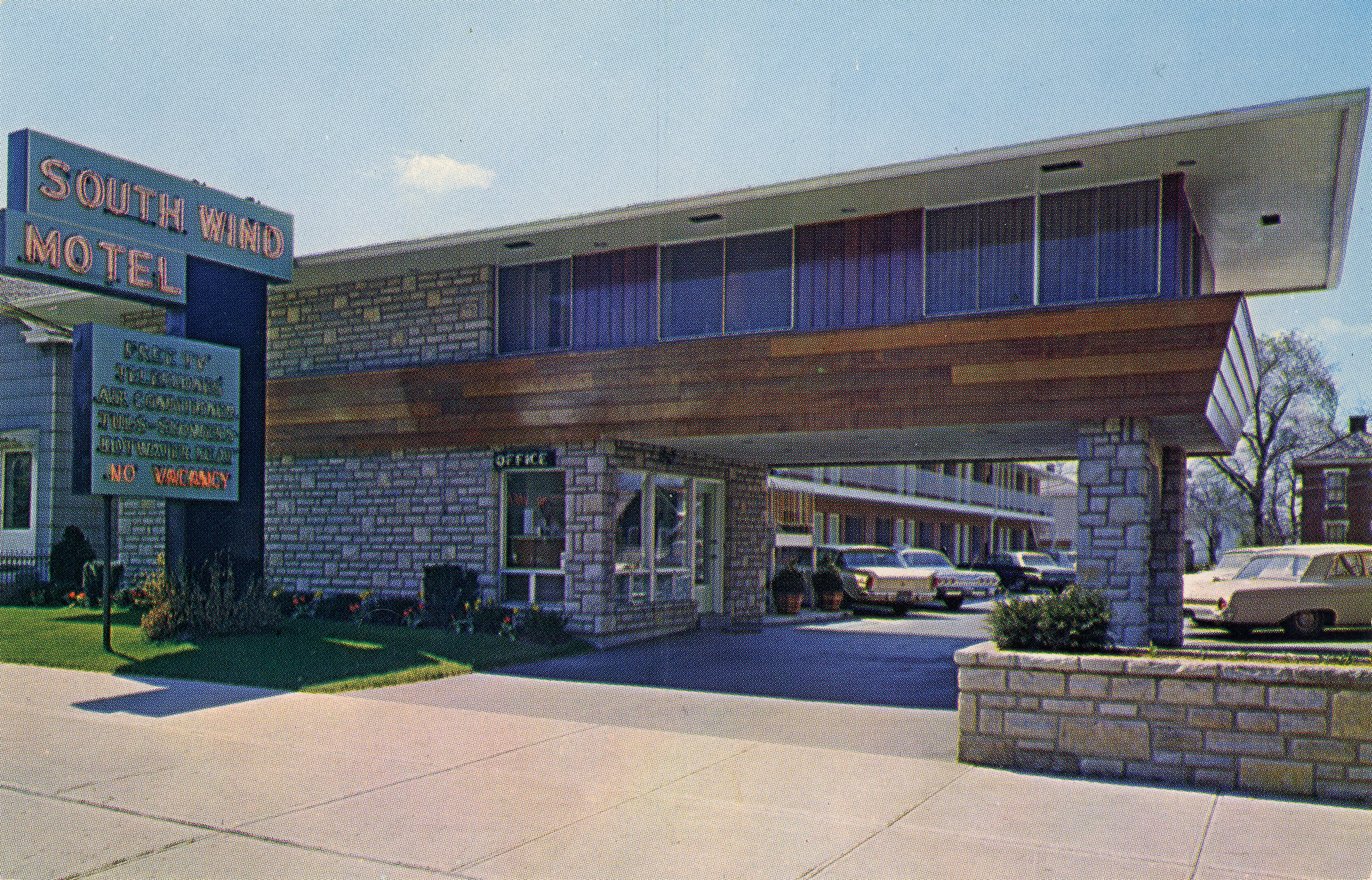
Midcentury postcard of the motel

The motel is situated on South High Street, one of the city's historic main corridors. It is in the Brewery District neighborhood of Columbus, near German Village.

The building was designed by local architect Harold Schofield, who also designed the Franklin Park Medical Center, on the National Register of Historic Places. It was designed with inspiration from the Prairie School of architecture, with an emphasis on horizontal lines and broad eave overhangs. The motel is one of few remaining commercial buildings in Columbus with this style. Its current retro theme is growing in popularity, especially on the West Coast of the United States; the motel may be the only retro-themed hotel in the Midwest.

It holds 19 guest rooms and three guest suites; the suites were created in the 2020s, combining six original rooms. Amenities at the time of opening included air conditioning, Sealy orthopedic mattresses, a complimentary continental breakfast, as well as a 21-inch television in each room, and wall-to-wall carpeting. Current notable amenities include styled decor, plush bedding, local furnishings, and electric vehicle chargers. Parking is complementary, on-site. The motel rooms are brightly decorated, with custom and antique furniture, bright patterned wallpapers, walnut wood paneling, and antique signs from around Columbus. Rooms are stocked with local beers, records, coffee, and skincare products.

The building features a large mid-century-style sign, with a star motif and neon-like lighting. The sign was added during the 2020s renovation, and was inspired by iconic neon signs in Columbus.

The hotel is independently owned, with no national affiliation.

Gallery

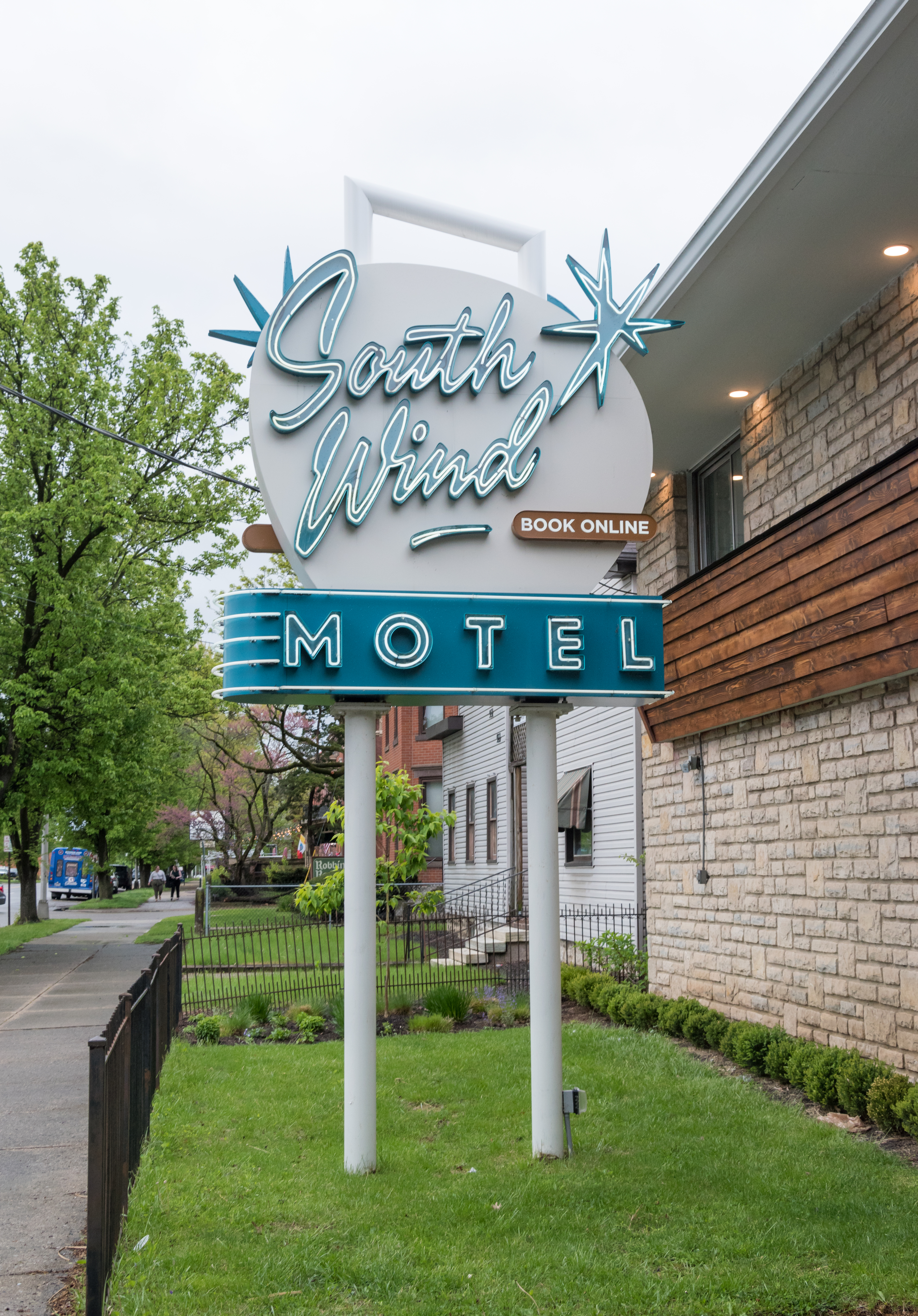
Sign on High Street

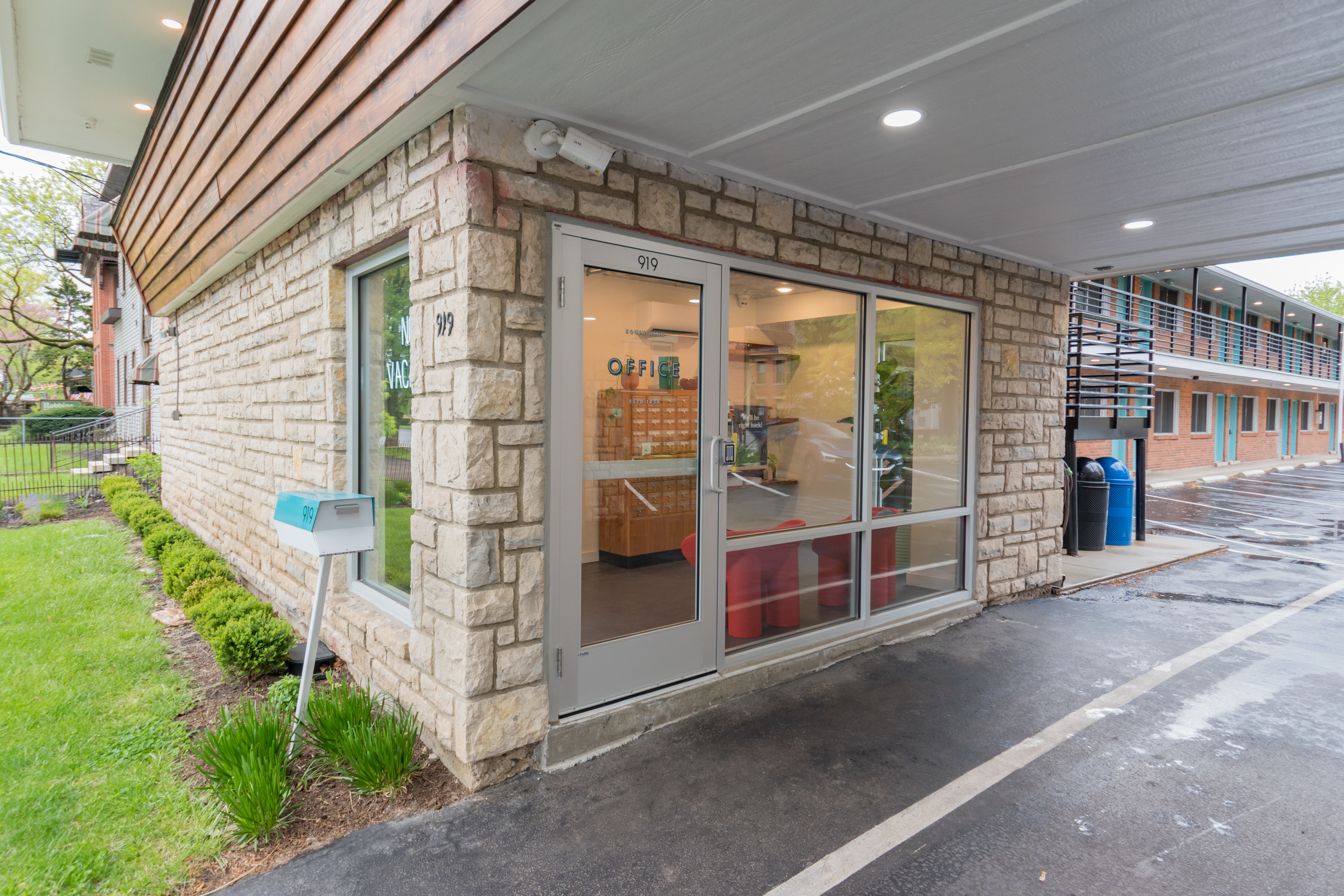
Office

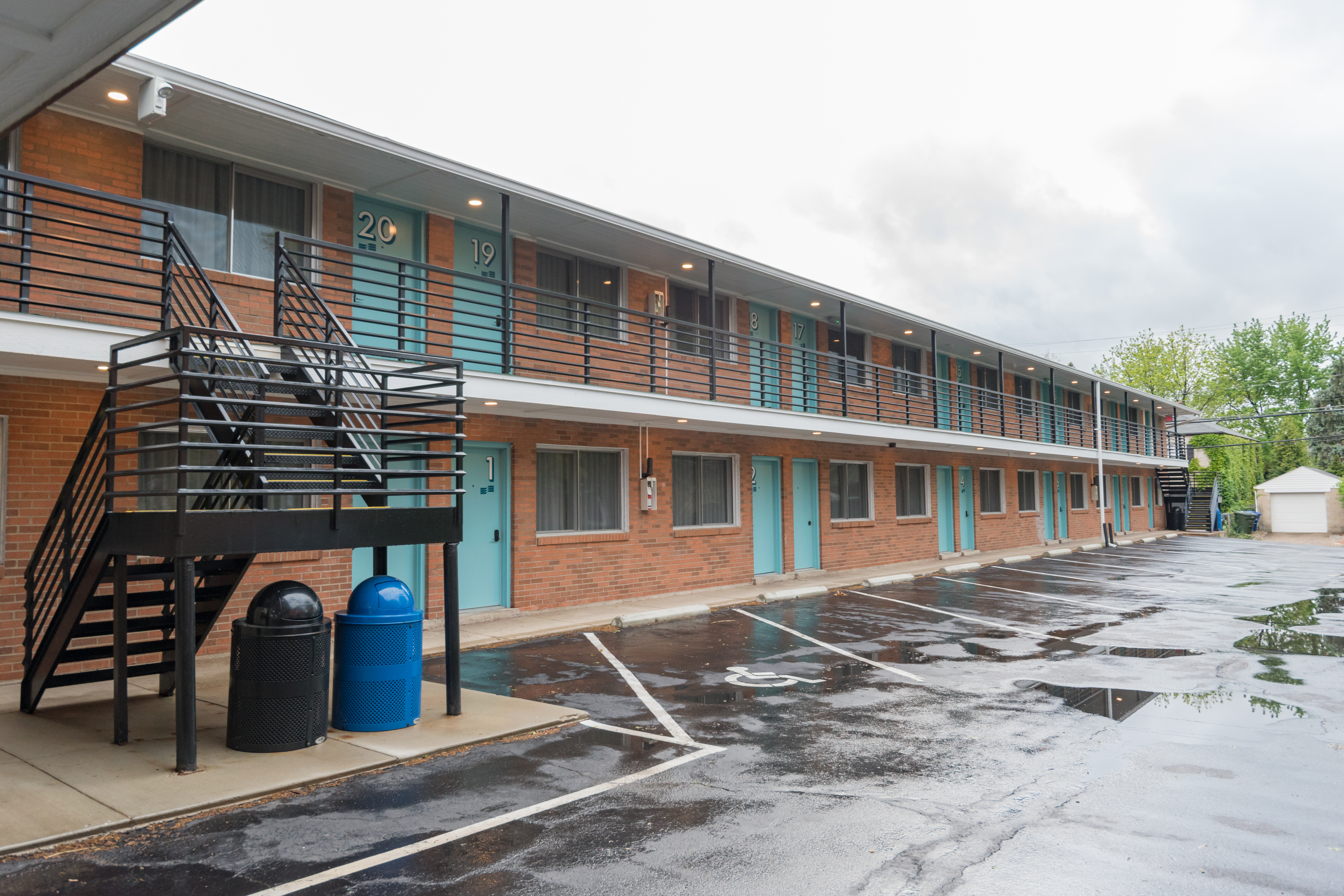
Room entrances

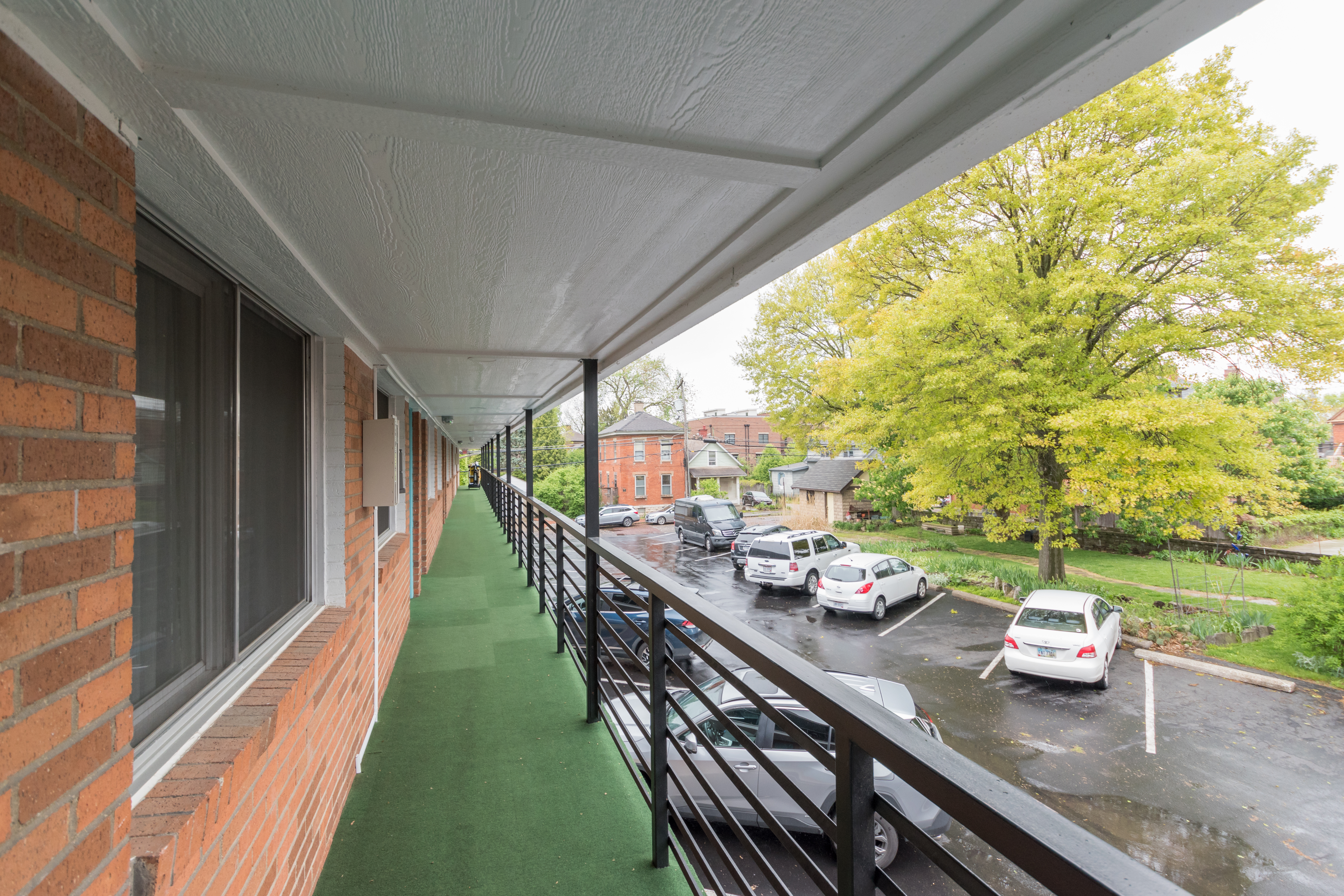
Balcony and second-floor rooms

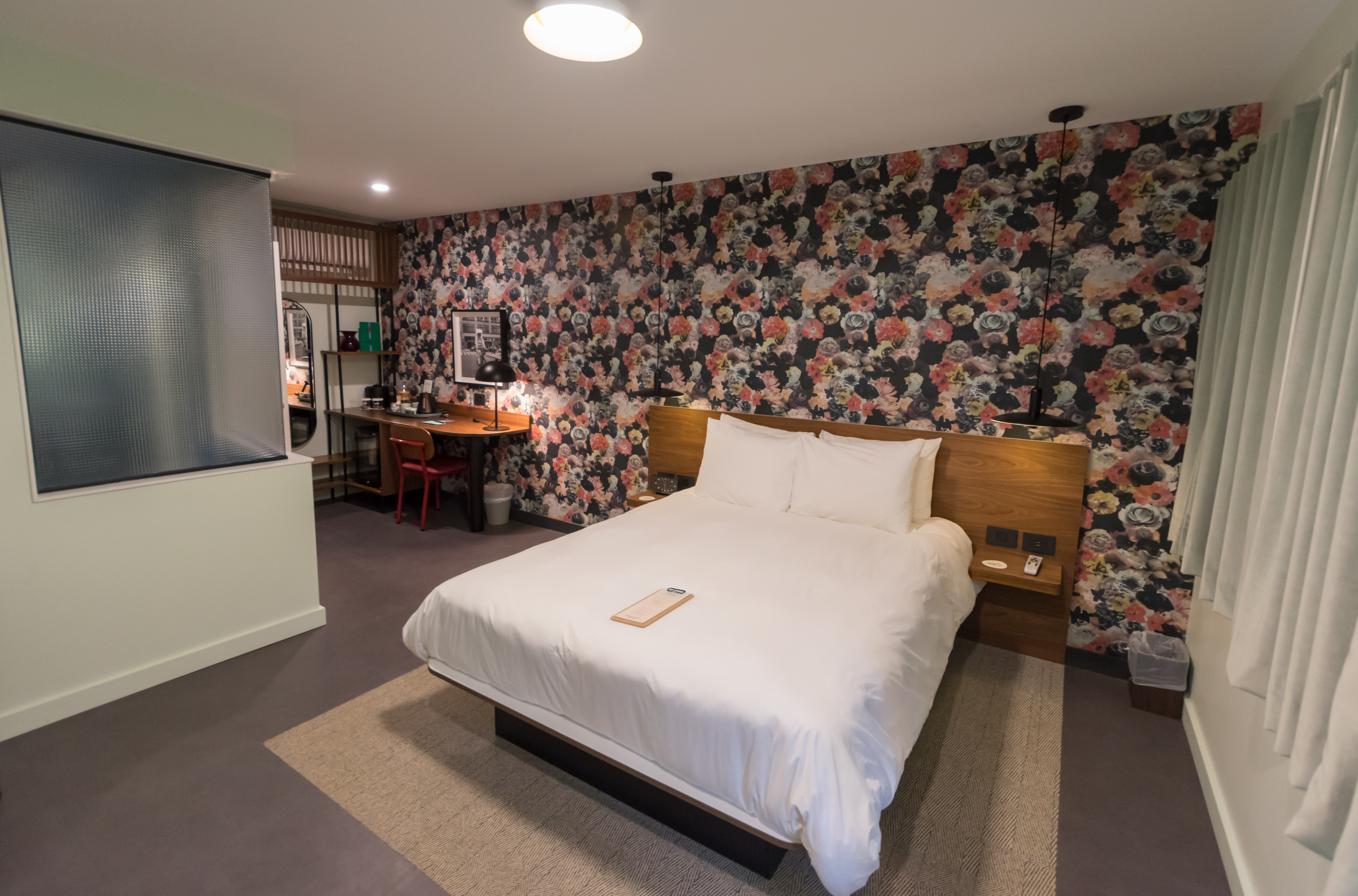
One of the bedrooms

== History ==
The South Wind Motel opened in July 1959, originally owned by golfer Benny Newpoff. It originally had 25 rooms, and a "three-room hostess apartment". At the time, motor hotels were popular to the general public, located near highway exits, and patronized by road trippers, journalists, musicians, and other travelers. The South Wind Motel was in continuous operation until its renovation in the 2020s.

In 1982 and 1983, the motel became the center of a dispute between the motel owner and Columbus mayor Greg Lashutka. The owner alleged that Lashutka used Columbus police officers to settle a private dispute. Lashutka had demanded a coat belonging to a female friend, Linda Fisher. A sex worker had carried the coat, including Fisher's keys and identification, from a nearby tavern the pair were at over to the motel. The hotel staff refused to give Lashutka access to the prostitute's room until the police arrived.

From then into the 21st century, the motel became associated with crime and drugs; before the renovation, it rented rooms by the hour. In 1996, a guest was killed after leaving the Tremont Lounge, a nearby gay bar, with a companion. In 2002, a motel clerk was shot during a robbery at the motel office. A firefighter testified he and a male lover attempted to buy cocaine from the two suspects, and later smoked cocaine in the motel with his lover while on duty. In the 2010s, the surrounding area gentrified, with numerous bars and eateries opening near the Tremont, including a high-end restaurant and a brewery with a bar.

In February 2021, the property was sold for $535,000 to The Kelley Companies, a local developer. The developer began restoring the building over the next year and a half. Kelley sought a "boutique motel" style, marketing to non-traditional guests seeking out the food and beverage culture of the surrounding area, as well as business travelers seeking a unique hotel. The renovation included adding retro-style elements, including analog alarm clocks and aqua blue shower tiles, new though identical in color and size to the original rooms. Custom beds and desks were designed by a local furniture maker, and new mechanicals, wallpaper, flooring, and bathroom fixtures were installed. In renovating, the developer sought to be as eco-friendly as possible. Modern energy-efficient features were installed, including electric car chargers, rainwater tanks, rooftop solar panels for most of the hotel's energy use, and new efficient windows, doors, and HVAC. Soaps and other products are from a local supplier that focuses on sustainability and ethical sourcing.

The renovation involved cleaning all the exterior brick and stonework. On the exterior facing High Street, a section of painted plywood was replaced with stained cedar wood. New windows were placed in original aluminum window frames. The hotel reopened in July 2022.

== See also ==
- List of motels
