= Santa Fe Valley =

Cancelled hotel-casino in Henderson, Nevada, US

- Interactive map of Santa Fe Valley
- Location: Henderson, Nevada, United States; 36.066248°N 115.037370°W
- No. of rooms: 200–300
- Gaming space: 74,000–75,000 sq ft
- Casino type: Land-based

Santa Fe Valley (also known later as the Santa Fe Galleria Hotel & Casino) is a cancelled hotel-casino that was planned by Santa Fe Gaming for 40 acres (16 ha) of land in Henderson, Nevada, next to the Galleria at Sunset mall. The project was announced in 1994, and construction was expected to begin in July 1996. The start of construction was delayed several times because of poor financial quarters for Santa Fe Gaming and because of the company not yet receiving financing for the project. Site preparation started in July 1998, with an opening date scheduled for December 1999, but construction never began. In 1999, the property was sold to Station Casinos, which sold the land a year later for use as a shopping center.

== History ==
In March 1994, Sahara Gaming Corporation, which owned the Santa Fe hotel-casino in northwest Las Vegas, announced plans for a then-unnamed casino and 200-room hotel that would be built on 40 acres (16 ha) of land at the northwest corner of Sunset Road and Marks Street in Henderson, Nevada, adjacent to the proposed Galleria at Sunset mall. Like the Santa Fe, the new resort would include an ice rink and bowling alley. By early 1996, Santa Fe Gaming (formerly Sahara Gaming) was planning the project as a second Santa Fe resort to be known as the Santa Fe Valley. The new project would be loosely patterned after the original Santa Fe resort. Features would include 300 hotel rooms; a 74,000 sq ft (6,900 m^{2}) casino with 1,600 slot machines and 37 table games; four restaurants; an ice rink; and an "adult playground" that would include basketball courts, hockey facilities, pool tables, and virtual reality games. The cost to build the new project was initially between $100 million and $120 million. Construction was expected to begin in July 1996, with completion scheduled for 18 months later. Later in 1996, the project underwent a design change to better compete against Station Casinos' new Sunset Station resort, located across from the planned Santa Fe site. The project was delayed several times because of poor financial quarters for Santa Fe Gaming. As of February 1997, the Santa Fe Valley was scheduled to begin construction in late summer 1997.

By May 1997, the project was known as the Santa Fe Galleria Hotel, with plans to connect it to the adjacent Galleria mall. Santa Fe Gaming had yet to arrange financing for the project, which was expected to cost $130 million. By January 1998, construction had still not begun, and Santa Fe Gaming had yet to obtain financing or city approval for the project. Up to that point, the Culinary Workers Union, which was in a dispute with the northwest Santa Fe resort, gathered 2,500 community opponents to the concept of a casino connected to the mall. That month, Santa Fe Gaming chose to delay connecting the project to the mall until after the new resort was opened. The decision on whether to connect the properties was also predicated on the mall's expansion to include two anchor stores.

The Santa Fe project was unanimously approved by the Henderson City Council in February 1998, with groundbreaking scheduled for May. The project would now include 300 hotel rooms in a 147-foot tower, a 73,316 sq ft (6,811.3 m^{2}) casino, an ice rink with seating for 886 people, and a 1,000-seat theater. The mission-style project would feature a total of 471,191 sq ft (43,775.1 m^{2}), and would include an 85-foot bell tower. To alleviate concerns about children from the mall going into the casino, the ice rink was now planned to be built between the mall and the casino, and the rink and a planned arcade would have entrances separate from the casino. The ice rink would be the only one in Henderson, and mayor James B. Gibson considered it beneficial to the community.

In June 1998, new plans were filed for the project, which would include 290 hotel rooms, a 75,000 sq ft (7,000 m^{2}) casino, five restaurants, a sports bar, two lounges, an arcade, a child-care center, an ice rink, and 4,800 sq ft (450 m^{2}) of retail space. Construction costs for the project were between $100 million and $130 million. Construction was expected to begin by late June 1998, with July 15 as a deadline; otherwise, Santa Fe Gaming would need to reapply for a special-use permit. On July 8, 1998, workers began preparing the site by leveling it and removing rocks and desert plants. A foundation permit was expected to be issued the next week, followed by a building permit approximately eight weeks after that. A sign on the vacant property promoted the project as "Santa Fe Valley", with an advertised opening date of December 1999; city records listed the project as "Santa Fe Galleria Hotel & Casino". The main hotel building would be located approximately 200 feet north of Sunset Road, while parking would stretch both north of the hotel building to Galleria Drive and east to Marks Street.

The project was further delayed by Santa Fe Gaming not yet receiving financing. Site preparation was underway in December 1998, with digging for the hotel tower's foundation expected to begin at the end of the month, followed by concrete pouring two weeks later. An official groundbreaking was not scheduled until Santa Fe Gaming could obtain financing for the project. In November 1999, Santa Fe Gaming sold the 40-acre property for $37.25 million to Station Casinos, to help pay off a $57.5 million loan that was due the following month. No construction had occurred up to that point. In 2000, Station Casinos sold the property to Laurich Properties Inc., which subsequently built the $75 million, 500,000 sq ft (46,000 m^{2}) SunMark Plaza shopping center on the site.
