= Santa Fe Station =

Hotel and casino in Las Vegas, Nevada

- Interactive map of Santa Fe Station
- Location: Las Vegas, Nevada, U.S.; 4949 North Rancho Drive; 36.2500°N 115.2448°W
- Opened: February 14, 1991; 35 years ago
- Theme: City of Santa Fe, New Mexico, U.S.
- No. of rooms: 200
- Gaming space: 151,001 sq ft (14,028.5 m^{2})
- Permanent shows: Chrome Showroom
- Signature attractions: Century Theatres; Santa Fe Lanes; Stoney's North Forty; 4949 Lounge
- Notable restaurants: The Brass Fork (formerly Grand Café); Feast Buffet (2006–2020); Leticia's Cocina & Catina; Kegler's Grill; The Charcoal Room; Stallone's Italian Eatery; Oyster Bar
- Casino type: Land-based
- Owner: Station Casinos
- Previous names: Santa Fe
- Renovated in: 1994, 1999, 2000–2001, 2004–2005, 2006, 2007
- Website: santafestation.com

Santa Fe Station is a hotel and casino located on North Rancho Drive in Las Vegas, Nevada. The casino is owned by Station Casinos and is located on 36 acres (15 ha) of land. The hotel-casino originally opened as the Santa Fe in 1991, and for several years included the only ice rink in Las Vegas. The Santa Fe was involved in a labor dispute with Culinary Workers Union that began in 1993 and lasted into 2000, when the resort was sold to Station Casinos. The resort was renamed as the Santa Fe Station, and subsequently underwent several expansions and renovations.

== History ==
=== Santa Fe (1991–2000) ===
In 1989, Paul Lowden, the head of Sahara Casino Partners Limited (later Santa Fe Gaming Corporation), had plans to build a hotel-casino in northwest Las Vegas. Although the northwest area was largely vacant, Lowden believed that it would eventually become the center of urban development, a belief that came true. Lowden announced the start of construction in June 1989. The southwestern-themed Santa Fe was built at 4949 North Rancho Drive, on 36 acres (15 ha) of land east of and directly alongside U.S. Route 95. The Santa Fe was built at a cost of $53 million, and received a gaming license in November 1990. At the time, Lowden stated that most local residents were now satisfied with the project, which had previously faced some opposition, as the residents believed the Santa Fe would disrupt their rural lifestyle.

The Santa Fe was opened on February 14, 1991. The Santa Fe included a 50,000 sq ft (4,600 m^{2}) casino with slot machines, table games, a poker room, a sportsbook, and bingo. The resort also included a 200-room hotel, a 60-lane bowling alley, and an ice rink overlooked by the Ice Lounge, which provided nightly entertainment. The bowling alley was one of seven in the United States to feature the advanced "BowlerVision" computer system. The resort also included four bars, and included two dining choices: the Lone Mountain Buffet, and Pablo's Café, which served Mexican, southwestern and American food. The Santa Fe Ice Arena was Las Vegas' only ice rink until 1998. The ice rink became popular among families, hockey leagues, and aspiring figure skaters, and was also used by Viktor Petrenko and Oksana Baiul, as well as ice dancers who appeared in shows on the Las Vegas Strip. The rink sometimes hosted tournaments that lasted up to four days and included up to 70 teams.

In February 1994, as the local area was undergoing expansion, plans were announced for an expansion of the Santa Fe to add four new restaurants, a larger sportsbook, and a 700-seat bingo hall. The expansion would add 65,000 sq ft (6,000 m^{2}) to the resort. In April 1994, Nevada state senator Sue Lowden, the wife of Paul Lowden, was named to the newly created position of president of the Santa Fe, overseeing operations and corporate development at the resort. The expansion was completed later that year, at a cost of $14 million. Among the new restaurants were the 38-seat Suzette's and the 140-seat Ti Amo. Suzette's was a French restaurant named after Sue Lowden. As of 1996, the casino had 1,900 slot machines, and was the closest casino to the Summerlin community. That year, profits decreased at the hotel-casino because of competition from the nearby Texas Station and Fiesta hotel-casinos, as well as nearby road construction work that hindered access to the Santa Fe, which had only $3.6 million in cash at one point that year.

In fall 1996, Station Casinos began discussions with Santa Fe Gaming about purchasing the Santa Fe resort, and Santa Fe Gaming was subsequently involved in unsuccessful discussions to merge with Station Casinos during 1997 and 1998. A renovation of the hotel rooms was underway in July 1999, and there was the possibility of future improvements, including more parking spaces and slot machines, a larger buffet, and a new restaurant. In November 1999, Station Casinos made a deal to purchase property in Henderson, Nevada that was owned by Santa Fe Gaming, which had been planning a second Santa Fe resort on the land. The deal included the option for Station Casinos to purchase the Santa Fe hotel-casino.

=== Santa Fe Station (2000–present) ===
In June 2000, Station Casinos announced plans to purchase the Santa Fe for $205 million and rename it Santa Fe Station, making it the company's seventh casino in Las Vegas. Station Casinos planned to improve the Santa Fe beginning in 2001, to bring it up to the company's standards, and the company would also receive an option to purchase 21 acres (8.5 ha) of land adjacent to the Santa Fe.

Station Casinos' purchase of the Santa Fe was approved in September 2000, and took effect on October 2, 2000, with the property renamed as Santa Fe Station. Station Casinos planned a three-phase, $100 million renovation and expansion of the Santa Fe to transform it into a Station property, while retaining the southwestern theme. The first phase was scheduled to begin on the day of the purchase, and was to be finished by the end of 2000. The first phase would include new carpeting and paint, 400 additional slot machines, and the renovation of the property's electrical system. The hotel, ice rink, bowling alley, and a small portion of the casino would remain open during the first phase. The second phase, scheduled for completion by mid-2001, would include a new cafe and the construction of a 1,600-space parking garage. The third phase would include a 2,400-space parking garage, a 12-screen movie theater, a child-care center, and a nightclub, as well as an additional 1,000 slot machines and 18 table games. No timeline for the third phase was specified.

In January 2001, the ongoing renovations were expanded to include the addition of 25,000 sq ft (2,300 m^{2}) in casino space, allowing for 750 new slot machines. Two new restaurants were also planned, and the new plans were expected to cost an additional $31 million, although renovations were on track for completion by June 2001. Aside from the parking garage and the casino/restaurant additions, the hotel was also renovated, and a fast-food court was added. The resort's buffet was removed, and the lounge was updated to be more upscale. In April 2003, Station Casinos and the Nevada Gaming Control Board launched their own investigations regarding financially related "filing irregularities" at the Santa Fe Station. Ultimately, Station Casinos was fined $2.2 million for its failure to file hundreds of federal government financial reports relating to its properties, including the Santa Fe.

In December 2003, plans were announced for a $50.3 million expansion and renovation that would be more substantial than the previous changes made by Station Casinos. The project would include the addition of 20,000 sq ft (1,900 m^{2}) to the casino, allowing space for 350 new slot machines. The plan also included upgrades to the 49,000 sq ft (4,600 m^{2}) bowling alley, and replacing the ice rink with a 16-screen movie theater. To alleviate concerns about the ice rink's closure, especially from members of the community, Station Casinos built a new rink at its nearby Fiesta Rancho hotel-casino. Construction for the upgrades was scheduled to begin in July 2004, and the new areas were expected to be opened by March 2005. Remodeling of the bowling alley was underway in May 2004, and was done in phases that allowed the facility to remain open during renovations.

Work on the expansion and renovation was underway in October 2004. On December 31, 2004, the resort opened The Santa Fe Showroom with a performance from a 1980s cover band. Judy Alberti, Station Casinos' vice president of entertainment, said about the showroom's name, "We came up with all these names but couldn't decide on one we all liked in time." Concerts in the showroom were scheduled to begin in February 2005. The showroom expanded The Green Room, a defunct cabaret area, into space that was previously occupied by the old ice rink. The showroom had 515 seats across three tiers, including table seating on the first two tiers left over from The Green Room, accompanied by a third tier of theater-style stadium seats for concerts. By the end of 2005, the showroom had become known as the Chrome Showroom. The 16-screen movie theater opened in May 2005, and was primarily located inside a new building connected to the Santa Fe Station. The theater included nearly 100 employees, and was built at a cost of $14 million. It was operated by Century Theatres, and was the company's first theater to open inside a Station Casinos property. Purple Reign, a Prince tribute show, began appearing at the Chrome Showroom in February 2006.

Another phase of expansion, costing $120 million, was expected to begin in August 2005 and conclude in September 2006. A second parking garage, with 2,900 spaces, was built on the north end of the property and was nearing completion in October 2006. The resort's expansion ultimately cost $130 million, and concluded in December 2006. By that time, Station Casinos had spent $458 million on the property, including the $205 million purchase price; the Las Vegas Review-Journal noted that the company "could have built an entirely new hotel-casino" for the amount that it had spent up to that point. Aside from the 200-room hotel tower, not much remained of the original Santa Fe, due to the extensive renovations by Station Casinos. Company spokeswoman Lori Nelson said, "What we added and what was done to this property was a reflection of what it needed to compete in this market." New changes included additional casino space, an improved 259-seat race and sportsbook, additional restaurants, a remodeled bowling alley, and the new parking garage. Also part of the expansion was the new Feast Buffet, which opened on December 4, 2006. Jeff Lovari, the public relations manager for Station Casinos, described the buffet as the resort's "crown jewel" and said that prior to its opening, "We were probably the only casino in Las Vegas to not have a buffet." Two additional restaurants and an entertainment lounge were expected to open in 2007.

In March 2007, the Santa Fe Station opened a new casino pit with additional blackjack and craps tables, and offered mini-baccarat for the first time. In January 2008, the casino discontinued free blues entertainment at its Chrome club. The Santa Fe Station's Salt Lick barbecue restaurant closed on May 31, 2008. By that point, nightclub owner Stoney Gray signed a deal with Station Casinos to open a country-western nightclub, Stoney's North Forty, in the former restaurant space, which consisted of approximately 9,000 sq ft (840 m^{2}). Stoney's North Forty, Gray's second nightclub, opened on December 31, 2009, and had the capacity to hold 620 people. The nightclub closed in late November 2009, as part of a mutual decision between Gray and Station Casinos to part ways. A new bar and nightclub, Revolver, was expected to replace Stoney's North Forty, with a soft opening scheduled for early February 2010.

In November 2016, the casino opened a new 10,000 sq ft (930 m^{2}) bingo hall, replacing the Revolver country nightclub/bar. The new bingo hall, with seating for 350 people, was slightly smaller than the previous one. As of 2017, the casino is 151,001 sq ft (14,028.5 m^{2}).

== Labor and union controversies ==
In October 1993, employees of the hotel-casino voted to accept representation from Culinary Workers Union, a decision that was opposed by Santa Fe officials. The Santa Fe's final appeal of the decision was rejected in 1996, and negotiations began in January 1998. The labor dispute related to health insurance coverage; and to higher wages, which the Santa Fe stated it was unable to afford. In September 1998, approximately 59 Culinary union members were arrested after staging a one-day sit-down strike inside the hotel. The dispute and negotiations continued into the following year, at which point the union accused the Santa Fe of intentionally delaying the completion of a contract. The Santa Fe stated that it was impossible to negotiate a contract quickly due to many issues involved in the discussions.

The dispute was ongoing when Station Casinos announced its plans to purchase the Santa Fe, and the union hoped that the company would be willing to negotiate a contract for the property's 700-800 union-eligible employees. Station Casinos planned to hire a new work force for the Santa Fe to guarantee the quality of the staff. The resort had 900 employees, and Station Casinos allowed them to apply to potentially keep their jobs under the new ownership. The Culinary Workers Union opposed Station Casinos' plan to make the Santa Fe's employees reapply for their jobs.

In mid-September 2000, an employment center for the Santa Fe Station was opened and received 400 applications in its first day, with 90 percent of those being current employees of the resort. At that time, the Nevada Gaming Control Board rejected Culinary's request that regulators require Station Casinos to reverse its termination of the Santa Fe's employees. Later in the month, the Las Vegas City Council rejected a request from the union to mandate that Station Casinos retain a certain number of Santa Fe employees. Las Vegas mayor Oscar Goodman was initially supportive of the union's efforts but stated, "As the law presently exists, we can't impose a condition that these folks be retained."

The Nevada Gaming Commission subsequently rejected a regulation proposed by the union which would restrict employee layoffs whenever casinos are sold. By the end of September 2000, approximately 300 of the Santa Fe's 900 employees had left the resort, while approximately 400 others had applied with Station Casinos to keep their jobs. Of the 400 employees, approximately 150 had been rehired or were awaiting possible job offers. In 2002, a former Santa Fe employee alleged that he was beaten on the property's parking lot in 1996 because of his prior Culinary union organizing activities and was subsequently fired for missing too much work as the result of his injuries. Paul Lowden disputed the assault claim, stating that no charges were ever filed.

== Awards ==
The Santa Fe Station won the "Best Locals Casino" award for 2008 by the Las Vegas Review-Journal.
