= Schlee Brewery Historic District =

Historic district in Ohio, United States

- U.S. National Register of Historic Places
- U.S. Historic district
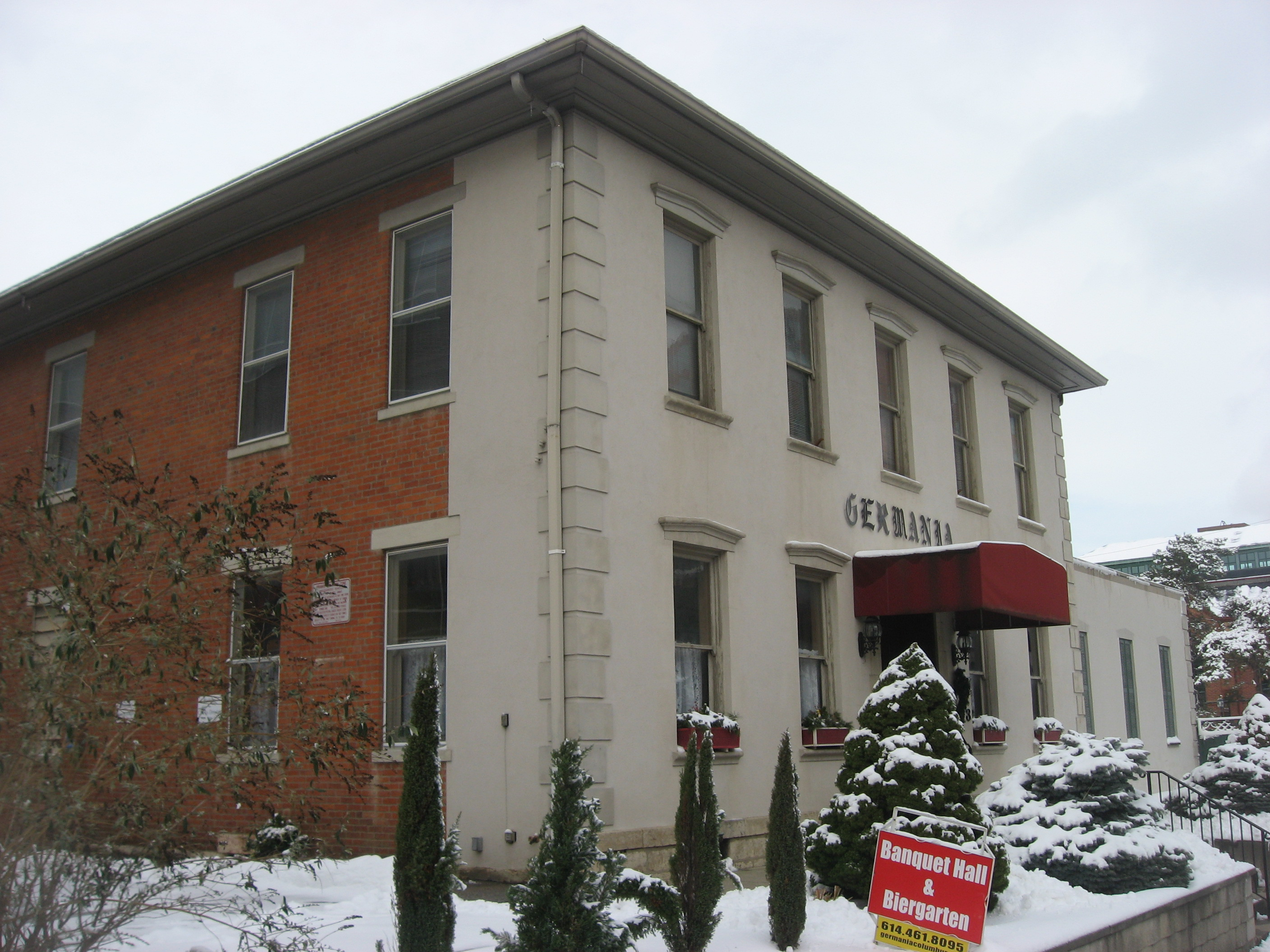
- Interactive map
- Location: 526, 543, 560, and rear 526 S. Front St., and the northeastern corner of Beck St. and Wall Alley, Columbus, Ohio
- Coordinates: 39.951047°N 82.999947°W
- NRHP reference No.: 88000208
- Added to NRHP: March 28, 1988

The Schlee Brewery Historic District is a historic district in the Brewery District neighborhood of Columbus, Ohio. It was listed on the National Register of Historic Places in 1988. At the time of nomination, the site consisted of six buildings, all of which are contributing. Most are two-to-three story commercial brick buildings built between the 1860s and 1890s.

== See also ==
- National Register of Historic Places listings in Columbus, Ohio
