= Senator Wiener =

Senator Wiener may refer to:

- Deanna Wiener (born 1953), Minnesota State Senate
- Scott Wiener (born 1970), California State Senate
- Valerie Wiener (born 1948), Nevada State Senate

== See also ==
- Senator Weiner (disambiguation)
