= Brewery District =

- Neighborhood of Columbus
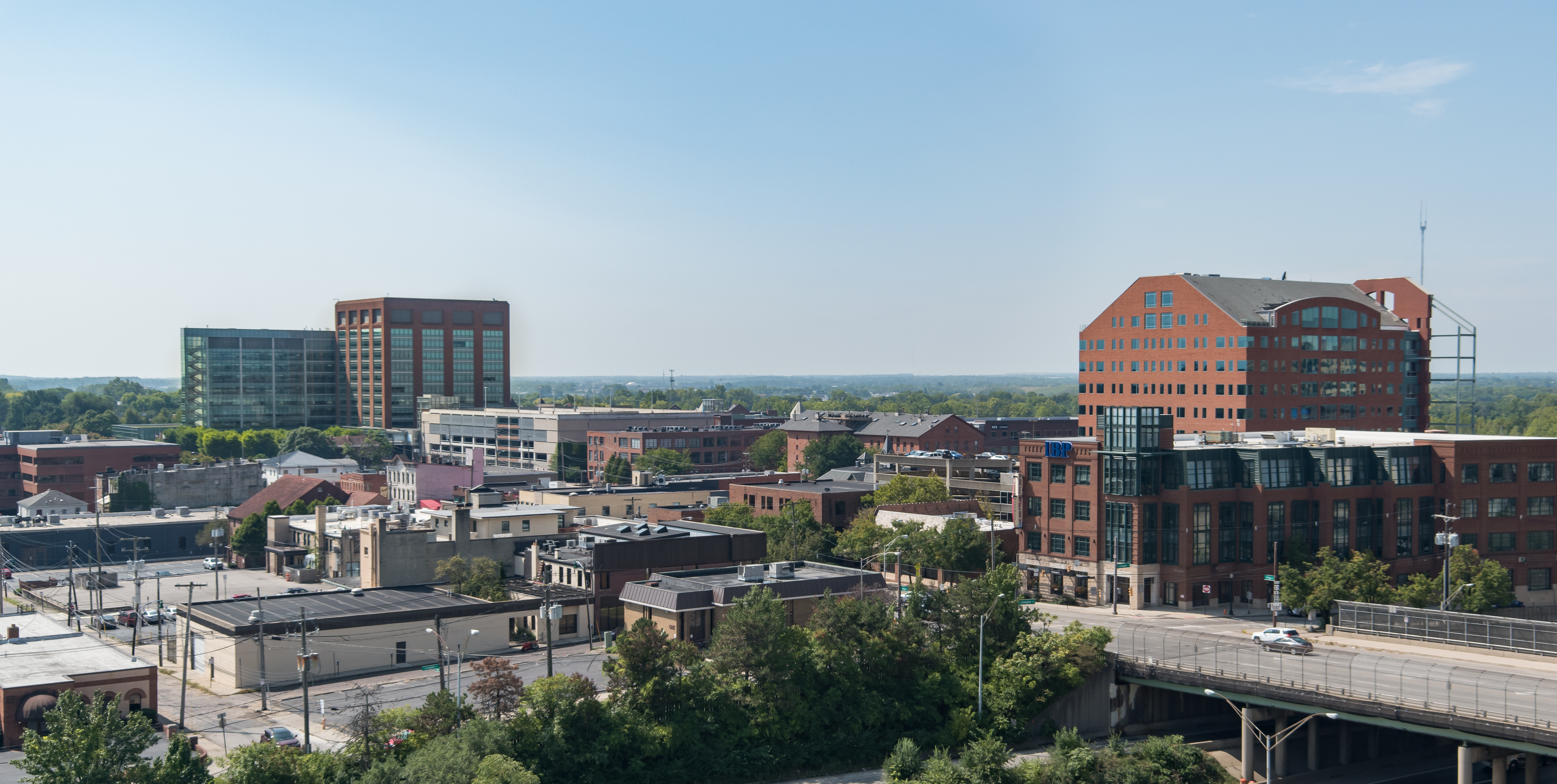
- Interactive map of Brewery District
- Coordinates: 39°58′09″N 83°00′22″W
- Country: United States
- State: Ohio
- County: Franklin
- City: Columbus
- ZIP Code: 43206, 43215
- Area code: 614

The Brewery District, traditionally known as the Old German Brewing District, is a neighborhood located in Columbus, Ohio. Located just south of the central business district and west of German Village, it is bounded by Interstate 70 on the north, South Pearl Street on the east, Greenlawn Avenue on the south, and the Scioto River on the west.

== History ==
The confluence of the Scioto River, the Columbus Feeder canal, and a spring-fed ravine made this area ideal for opening breweries. The first brewery was opened by Louis Hoster, Jacob Silbernagel and George M. Herancourt in 1836. Hoster soon bought out his other two partners, and significantly increased production of the beer that bore his name. Seeing the success of the brewery, other local businessmen opened additional breweries. At its peak the Brewery District was host to other major breweries: Schlegel Bavarian Brewery/Schlee Brewery (1849-Prohibition), Born's Capitol Brewery (1859-Prohibition), Gambrinus Brewing Company (1905–1974)

Soon after the opening of the breweries, homes were built in the area to house brewery and other industry workers. The area has a mix of German style 1 1/2-story, brick homes and Italianate. Today, many of these historical homes remain and add character of the Brewery District. Carved stone lintels, round, curved windows and doors, and hood moldings are just a few examples of architectural elements that are preserved in the district. The Brewery District Commission, established by an ordinance in 1993, is made up of seven appointees who are charged with the duty to, “preserve, protect, and enhance the unique architectural and historical features of the Brewery District.”

The Commission considers and approves applications for exterior alterations to facades of buildings within the Brewery District limit in hopes of maintaining its character. The breweries flourished during the Civil War, keeping pace with new innovations in the industry as they came, but a little later on, this modernization along with economic depression, caused smaller breweries to struggle. Because some breweries were able to modernize and combine many aspects of their brewing process into one- such as malting, bottling and other steps- the smaller breweries which could not carry out this modernization had to consolidate or close. By 1904, the remaining three large breweries had to merge into the Columbus Brewing Company, mostly due to Temperance movements gaining momentum in that time in Ohio and the start of World War I. In 1919, the 18th Amendment began Prohibition and City Brewery, along with the rest of the remaining breweries, was forced to shut down. Eventually, over the next seventy years, the buildings were sold off and used for various purposes including manufacturing and ware housing. The German character of the area was diminished as most of the German families moved away from the area in order to find jobs after the closing of the breweries.

== Geography ==
For the most part, the Brewery District is flat, with the exception of a 30-foot drop in terrain elevation further south. The Whittier Street Peninsula is also a 100-year floodplain, but there are no restrictions on development there because of this.

=== Regions ===
The brewery district's four sub-areas each has a distinct personality. They are the Northern Tier, the Transitional Tier, the Southern Tier, and the Whittier Street Peninsula.

==== Northern Tier ====
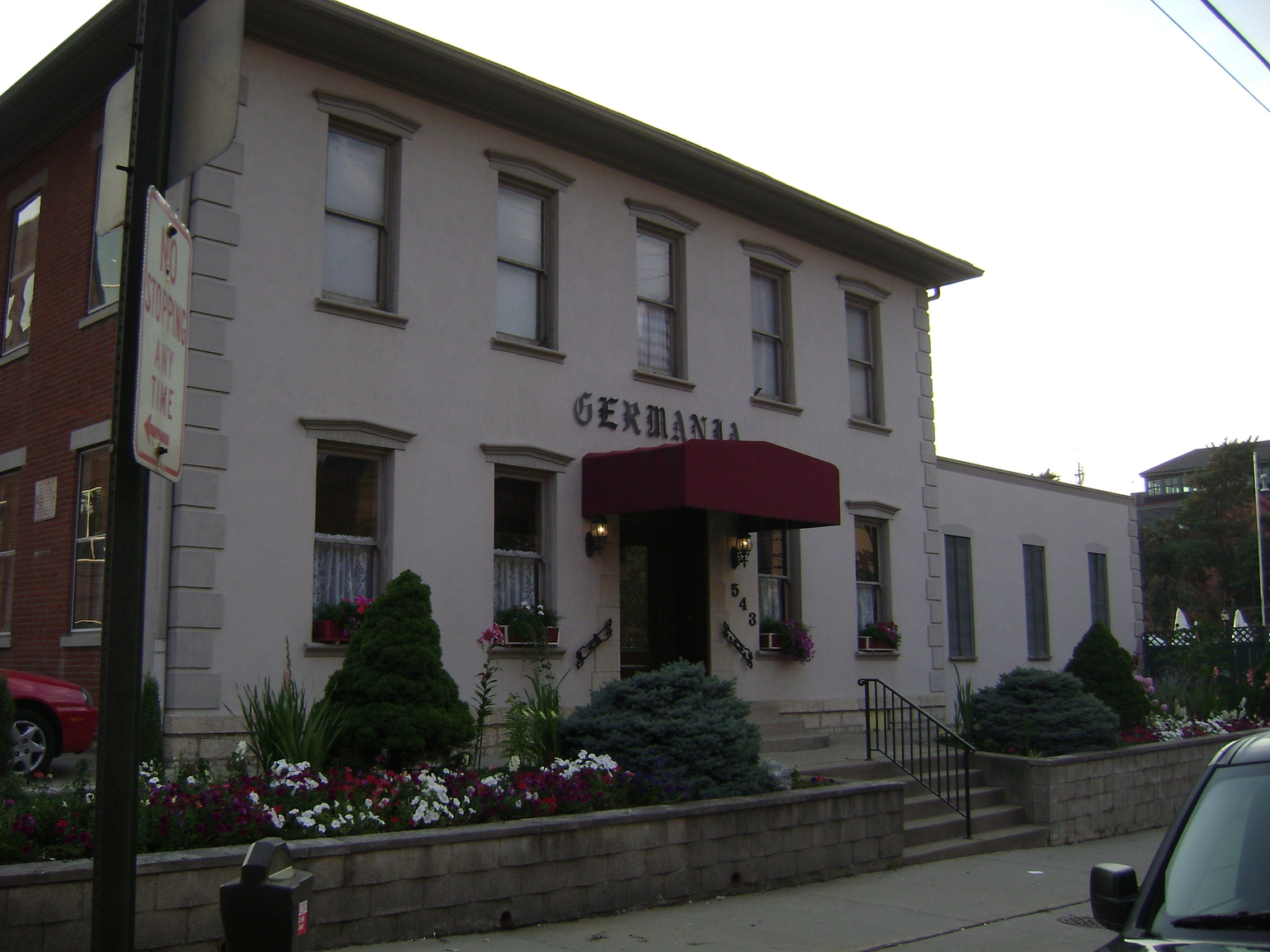
Schlee House, home to the Germania Society since 1927

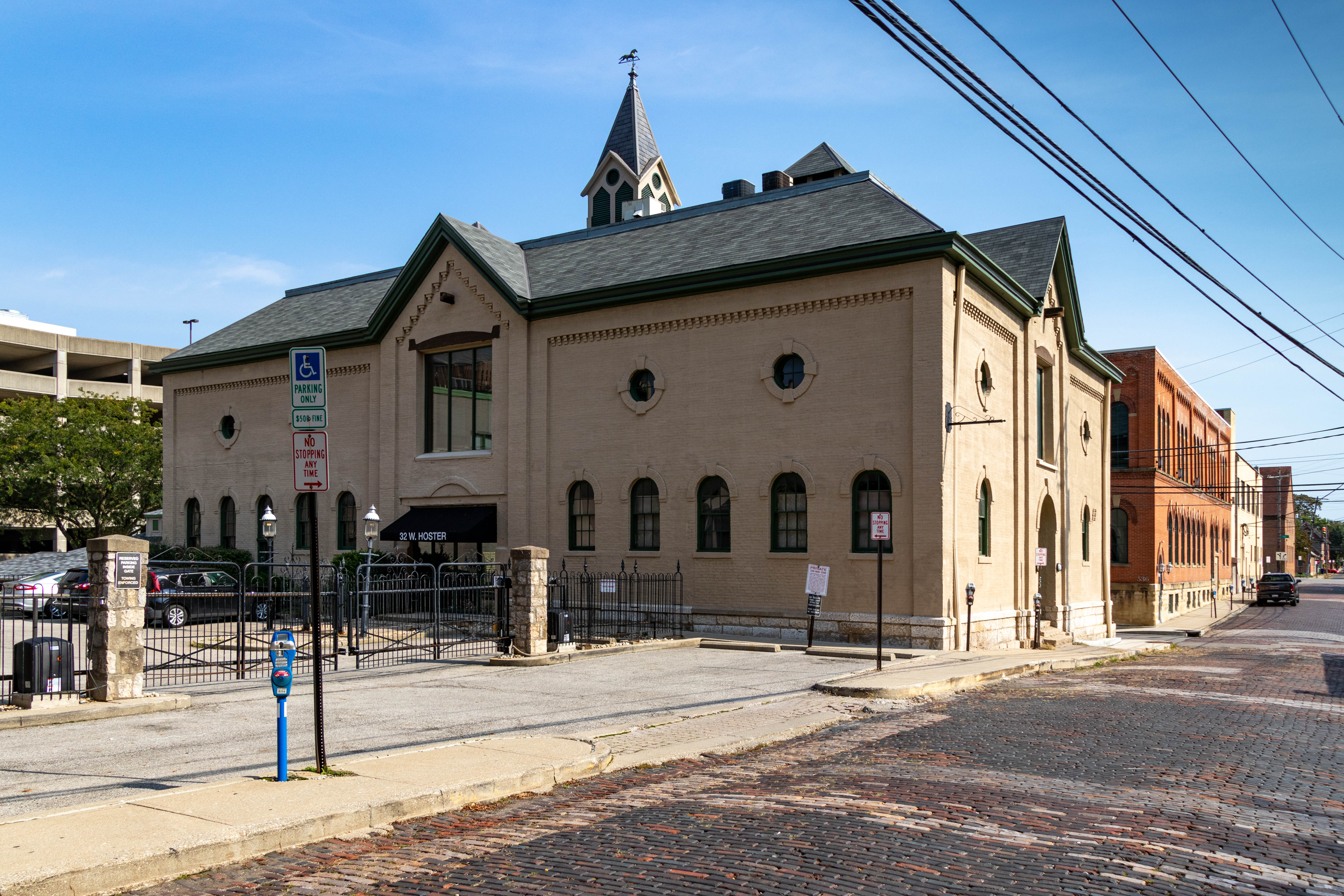
Former Schlee Brewery Stables

The Northern Tier is bounded by 1–70 on the north, Pearl Street on the east, Sycamore on the south and Short Street on the west. This tier is close to the Scioto River and has much of the district's earliest development. It is characterized by its remaining historic, industrial buildings featuring much brick and having very little to no setback. Some industry still remains in this tier, but the area has experienced large-scale re-development. The Germania Singing and Sport Society building, the former Schlee Mansion, is the oldest building on Front Street. This building, at 543 S. Front Street, (photo to the right) and its carriage house both appear in a 1870 city plat. The Schlee Brewery was recently adapted for mixed-use, including some residential units and specialty commercial spaces. This Schlee Brewery project and others have set the tone for this tier's re-development. In July 2019, it was announced that the L. Hoster Brewing Company site (including the former Wasserstrom Building) at Front Street and Livingston Avenue would have a $70 million redevelopment. The Hoster site is proposed to include a hotel and restaurant.

==== Southern Tier ====
The Southern Tier includes the area south of Frankfort to Greenlawn Avenue, between Pearl Street and the Conrail tracks. This area is primarily residential and is composed mainly of two- or three-story brick buildings with front yards, streets with side alleys, and other features common in residential neighborhoods. Architectural styles are similar to those in German Village. A loss of character has occurred in some areas of the district due to demolition and re-construction of homes.

==== Transitional Tier ====
The Transitional Tier is very much in transition, with large blocks of land purchased to make way for development. This tier is bordered by Sycamore on the north, Pearl Street on the east, Frankfort on the south and the Conrail tracks on the west.

==== Whittier Street Peninsula ====
The Whittier Street Peninsula, also called the Oxbow, includes all of the area west of Short Street to the Scioto River, from 1–70 to Greenlawn Avenue. The area had numerous industrial uses. It currently holds the Scioto Audubon Metro Park. Before completion of the park in 2009, the area still held manufacturing and warehousing, in addition to local government facilities.

== Development ==
Most of the development in the area has been commercial, as residential uses are generally not permitted because it is a historically industrial area. No new residential permits have been issued since in the past 112 years and only around $72,000 has been invested in alterations since 1990. On the other hand, almost twelve million dollars have been invested in the commercial sector since 1990. Most of the investment, however, has gone toward renovation and alterations.

== Transportation ==
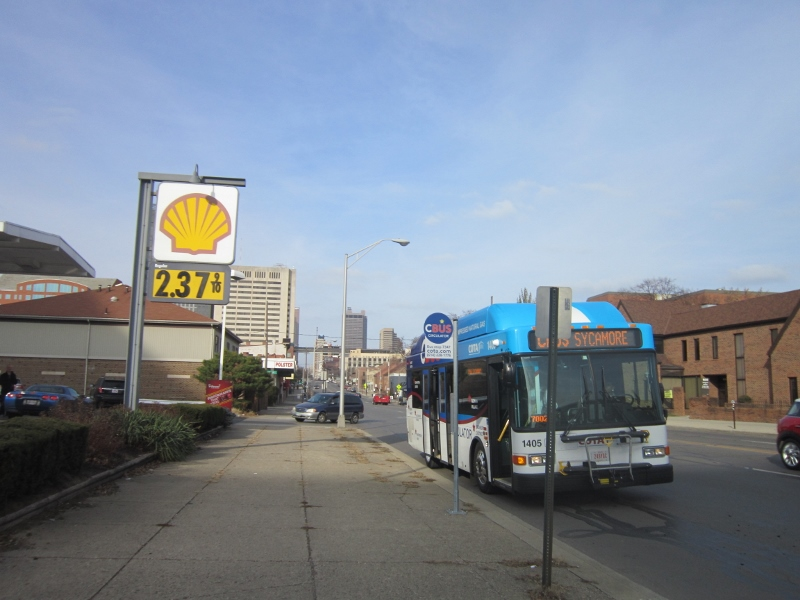
COTA circulator stopping on High Street

The district has High and Front Streets running north to south, and Greenlawn and Whittier running east to west. There is access to Route 315 as well as Interstate 70, but some residents have proposed making the access more direct. Additionally, COTA offers several bus routes through the neighborhood, including local and express services.

== Important organizations ==
The independent radio station WWCD (formerly CD 101, CD 102.5, and CD 92.9,) called the district home until it ceased broadcast in 2024. The Germania Singing and Sports Society, was founded in 1866 and in 1926 purchased the former mansion of one of the prestigious brew masters of the neighborhood, Nicholas Schlee. This building at 543 S. Front Street has been upgraded to include a bier garden on the adjoining lot, the former location brewmaster Jacob Silbernagel's home at the southwest corner of Front Street and Liberty Street.

== Entertainment ==
=== Nightlife ===
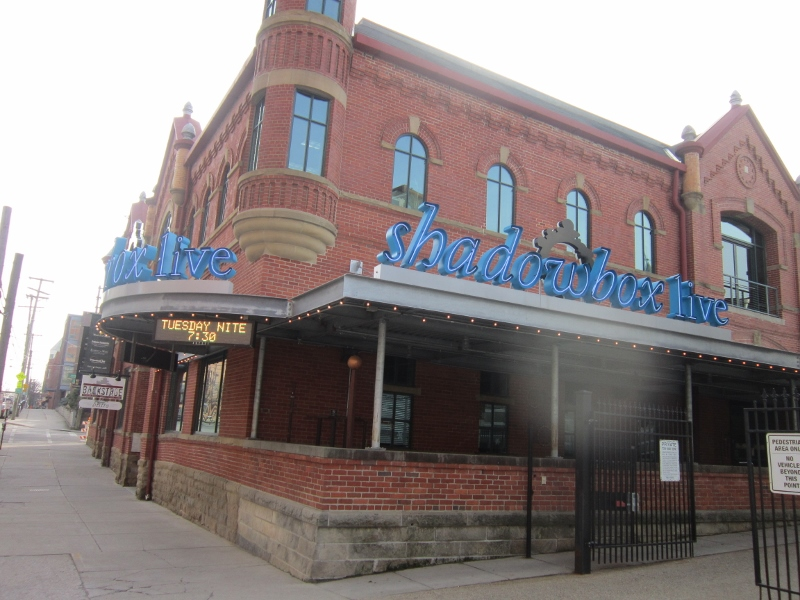
Shadowbox live theater

In the late '90s to early 2000s the Brewery District again became a popular spot in Columbus. It was the destination for many young professionals on weekends, with many opportunities to drink or dance. This flourishing period was short-lived due to the opening of a few bars on Park Street near the new Arena District area. The remaining businesses in the Brewery District focused on “becoming more of a destination restaurant,” according to Doug Griggs, owner of CBC Restaurant, but the nightlife seemed over.

After 2011, a comeback appeared to be underway. The Worly Building was renovated into a theater and bar complex to house Shadowbox Live and World of Beer, which helped bring life back into the area. Between 2010 and 2016, the Brewery District gained a nightclub, winery, live music venue, and several places to dine. Those with a hand in the Brewery District's redevelopment felt the prosperity will last longer because it focuses less on entertainment and nightlife and more on developing a historical, mature, and residential feel.

== Structures and landmarks ==
=== Scioto Audubon Metro Park ===
The Scioto Audubon Metro Park is a 120-acre park featuring many activities including wetlands, a dog park, and a rock climbing wall. A significant feature is the Grange Insurance Audubon Center, which serves as a stop for migrating birds. The park backs up to the Scioto River.

=== Born Brewery Building ===
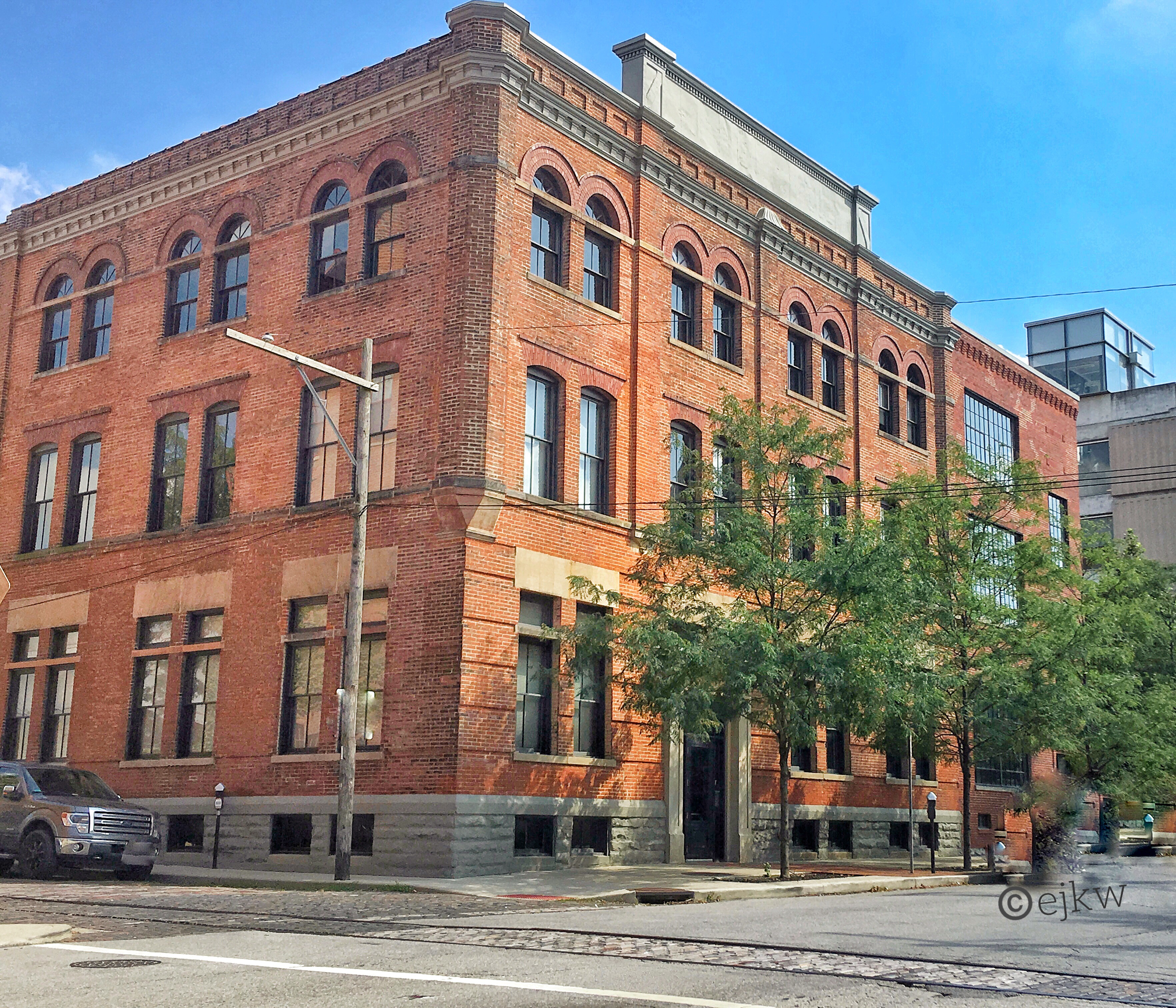
The Born Brewery Building

The Born Brewery building is the only remaining building of Born Brewery, one of four German breweries located on South Front Street during the nineteenth and early twentieth centuries, and was constructed in 1895. The building, which was the brewery's bottling plant, was the Salvation Army Thrift store for a time. In 2007, the building was sold to developers for $2.3 million, who renovated it into 47 apartments. In 2009 the building was listed on the National Register of Historic Places.

=== King Gambrinus ===
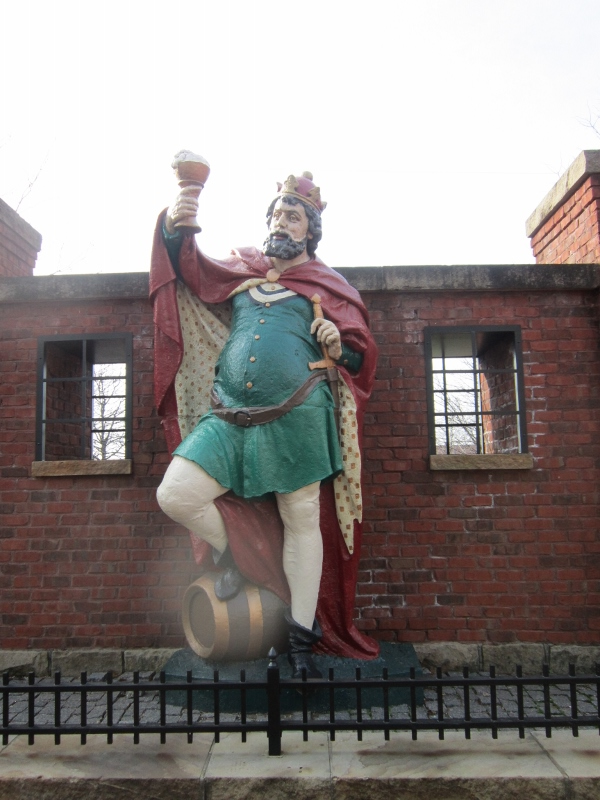
King Gambrinus statue

Also known as the “Drunken King,” this statue in the Brewery District was located over the August Wagner Brewery. August Wagner, a native of Bavaria, came to Columbus in 1900 and was the L. Hoster Brewing Company's brewmaster. After the Gambrinus Brewery was built, August Wagner bought all the stock and became the brewery's owner. He changed the name to August Wagner Brewery and adopted the statue of King Gambrinus as their symbol to maintain a connection to his Bavarian roots. King Gambrinus, according to legend, invented beer to woo his boss's daughter while he was apprenticing under him as a glass maker. The brewery later closed and was eventually demolished, but the Columbus Dispatch saved the statue of King Gambrinus. They had him restored and placed in a pocket park on the corner of Front and Sycamore. He remained there until 2000, and he now sits in a new park at the front of the district.

=== Worly Building ===
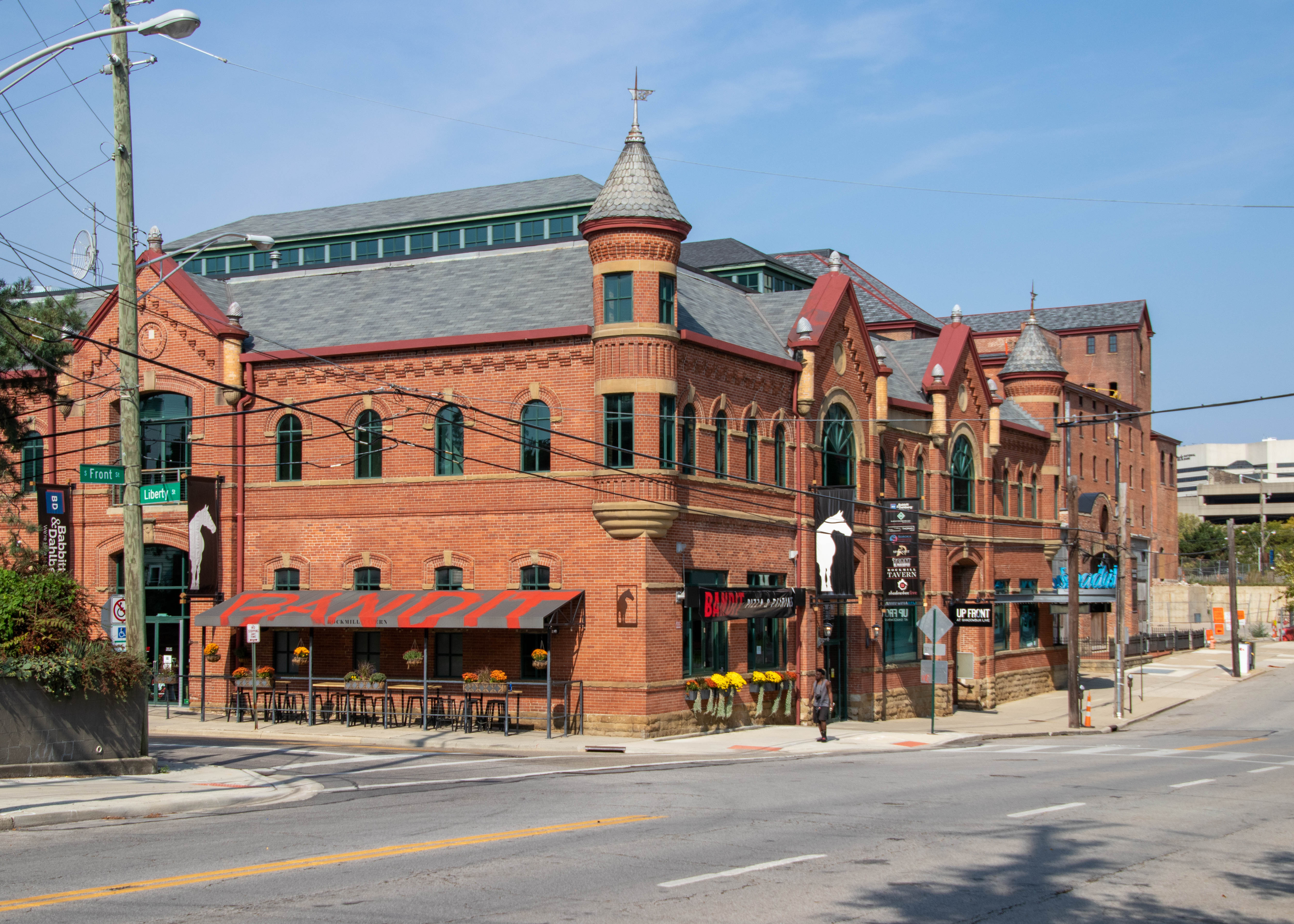
The Worly Building

Located at the district's center on South Front Street, this architecturally ornate structure was built to house horses for the attached Hoster Brewery. More recently, from 1996 to 2011 it was the home of WWCD, also known as CD101 or CD102.5, a local independent alternative rock station. In 2011 it was renovated to accommodate its most recent tenants: World of Beer, Shadowbox Live and the attached Backstage Bistro.

=== South Wind Motel ===
The South Wind Motel is a mid-century motel on High Street. The motel has operated continuously since 1959, and in 2021-22, it was extensively renovated into a boutique motel.
