= Jack Vergiels =

American educator and politician (1937–2009)

John M. "Jack" Vergiels (November 21, 1937 – December 16, 2009) was an American educator and politician.

He was born in Erie, Michigan on November 21, 1937. His family moved to Ohio, where Vergiels was raised. He earned a bachelor's, master's, and doctoral degree in education, all at the University of Toledo. Vergiels joined the faculty of the University of Nevada, Las Vegas. He was first elected to the Nevada Assembly in 1972, and served until 1984, when he ran for the Nevada Senate. Vergiels retained his seat until his 1992 reelection bid, and was succeeded in office by Sue Lowden.
