= Sue Lowden =

American politician (born 1952)

Republican National Committeewoman from Nevada
- Incumbent
- Assumed office September 2025
- Preceded by: Sigal Chattah

Chair of the Nevada Republican Party
- In office April 2007 – September 2009
- Preceded by: Paul Willis
- Succeeded by: Chris Comfort

Member of the Nevada Senate from the Clark 3 district
- In office 1993–1997
- Preceded by: Jack Vergiels
- Succeeded by: Valerie Wiener

Personal details
- Born: February 8, 1952 (age 74) National Park, New Jersey, United States
- Party: Republican (1992–present)
- Spouse: Paul Lowden
- Children: 3 sons (1 deceased); 1 daughter
- Education: American University (BA); Fairleigh Dickinson University (MA)
- Profession: Elementary school teacher, TV anchorwoman, businesswoman, politician
- Website: Official site
- Beauty pageant titleholder
- Title: Miss District of Columbia USA 1971
- Major competitions: Miss USA 1971 (top 12); Miss New Jersey 1973 (winner); Miss America 1974 (2nd runner up)

Suzanne "Sue" Pluskoski Lowden (/ˈloʊdən/; born February 8, 1952) is the former chairwoman of the Nevada Republican Party and a former Nevada state senator. Lowden is a former businesswoman, television news anchor, and kindergarten teacher. Lowden was an unsuccessful candidate for the Republican nomination in the 2010 United States Senate election in Nevada and the 2014 Nevada Lt. Governor election.

A native of National Park, New Jersey, Lowden was raised by a single mother. She is a graduate of American University and Fairleigh Dickinson University. She served as a state senator for Nevada from 1993 to 1997. During her four years in the state legislature, she held the senior leadership position of majority whip.

== Early life and career ==
Born Suzanne Parkinson Pluskoski, and raised in New Jersey, Lowden graduated in 1970 from Gloucester Catholic High School. At age 16, she became Miss National Park, New Jersey. She accumulated other local and regional titles, including Miss Gloucester County, Miss Cape May County, Miss New Jersey Apple Princess, and Miss Steel Pier in Atlantic City, New Jersey at age 19 in 1971. Lowden was Miss District of Columbia USA in 1971, and a semi-finalist at Miss USA. Changing her name to Suzanne Plummer, in 1973, she was Miss New Jersey on her second try, and was 2nd runner-up for Miss America, having won the swimsuit portion.

After a six-week USO tour, she completed a BA in education from American University in Washington, D.C., an MA in elementary education from Fairleigh Dickinson University in Rutherford, New Jersey, and was later granted an Honorary AA from then Community College of Southern Nevada. While finishing her degree, Lowden worked two years as a kindergarten teacher in Edgewater, New Jersey. Then, she moved to Los Angeles, California. Sending job applications to TV stations across the country, in 1978 she landed a job with KLAS-TV in Las Vegas, the local CBS affiliate for southern Nevada. She earned numerous awards for her work as a reporter and anchorwoman, such as the Associated Press and United Press International Award for Best Newscast. She became a member of the KLAS Channel 8 Hall of Fame. She left KLAS in 1987.

Lowden became an executive vice president of Sahara Hotel and Casino, then president of Santa Fe Station. Having a Nevada gaming license, she currently serves as a member of the Board of Directors and as secretary-treasurer of Archon Corporation, a gaming and investment company. For her work, Lowden received a Women of Achievement Award from the Las Vegas Chamber of Commerce. According to statements filed with the Senate Office of Public Records, she and her husband have more than $50 million in stock holdings, much of it in Las Vegas gaming companies.

== State Senate career ==
In 1992, Lowden ran for the Nevada State Senate in Clark County District 3, which usually elects members of the Democratic Party. She defeated longtime incumbent Jack Vergiels, who was then serving as the Nevada Senate Majority Leader.

In the Nevada Legislature, Lowden served as Senate majority whip and chairman of the Senate Taxation Committee. Her work in office earned her the Guardian of Small Business Award from the Nevada chapter of the National Federation of Independent Business (NFIB), Senator of the Year Award from the Clark County Republican Party, Woman of the Year Award from the Republican Women of Las Vegas, and Lifetime Achievement Award in 2008 from the Republican Women of Henderson.

The Culinary Workers Union, representing hotel workers, then the most powerful labor force in Las Vegas, has criticized Lowden for her votes to reform the State Industrial Insurance System, and because her casino fought efforts by workers to organize there. She said the union harassed her by picketing her home and threatened her to the point where she had to transfer her children to another school.

In 1996, she lost a re-election bid to Democrat Valerie Wiener, while most other incumbents held their seats.

In 2007, she became chairwoman of the Nevada Republican Party, and held that position until 2009.

== 2010 U.S. Senate run ==
On October 1, 2009, Lowden announced her bid for the Republican nomination for US Senate. Her main opponents in the Republican primary were businessman Danny Tarkanian and former state assemblywoman Sharron Angle. Had Lowden won the Republican primary, she would have run against U.S. Senator Harry Reid, the Senate majority leader. She received endorsements from Rush Limbaugh, Sean Hannity, Jeri Thompson, the Susan B. Anthony List, and former Nevada Governor Robert List.

Politico named Lowden's campaign one of "the worst" of 2010, stating, "if Senate Majority Leader Harry Reid wins re-election in Nevada, it will likely be thanks to those 14 words spoken by Republican challenger Sue Lowden", referring to her statement regarding "bringing a chicken to a doctor." Politico also cited controversy over Lowden's use of a campaign supporter's RV, and "an inept response to a question about the Civil Rights Act" as reasons.

Tarkanian was her closest primary opponent in two surveys conducted as of April 2010, but polling after Lowden's infamous suggestion that people use the barter system to lower their health care costs showed Angle moving to first place. In general election polling, she once held the largest lead against Reid in aggregate polling conducted as of April 2010. But later May polls showed Lowden losing to Harry Reid by 5 percentage points (42-37). In primary election polling, Lowden held an even greater lead of 18 points over her closest primary opponent in two independent surveys conducted April 2010. Her numbers then declined by more than 20 points.

Using data from a poll conducted by Mason-Dixon Polling & Research Inc. the Las Vegas Review-Journal on May 28, 2010 stated that "Republican Sue Lowden has the best chance of defeating U.S. Sen. Harry Reid". The poll predicted that Lowden would win 42 percent of the vote over Reid's 39 percent with a margin of error "plus or minus 4 percentage points."

Sharron Angle went on to defeat Lowden by a margin of 13.98%.

== 2014 election ==
Lowden confirmed with Nevada political pundit Jon Ralston that she was considering a run for Nevada lieutenant governor in 2014. Ultimately, she lost the primary election to State Senator Mark Hutchison by nearly 18% of the vote.

== Personal life ==
In 1983, she married Paul Lowden, a Nevada businessman. At the time, he owned the Sahara and Hacienda casinos. They later built the Santa Fe Station casino and remain majority owners of the Pioneer Hotel & Gambling Hall. He had a son and daughter, and together they had two sons (her youngest died at 17). They have one granddaughter. Lowden and her husband reside in Las Vegas.

The Stoney' Rockin Country trademark is currently owned by Archon Corporation. Lowden sits on the board, owns majority of the company stock, and serves in an executive position.

== Appearance in media ==
Lowden had an impromptu appearance on The Tonight Show in 1978 where she was picked out of the audience by guest host Don Rickles who fawned over her physical beauty. Rickles joked, "you've got a great a body, I'm not saying that in any kind of sexy way...I want to be with you so bad Sue!" Sue was accompanied by two acquaintances, one of whom was former professional NFL football player Edgar Chandler.

Honorary titles
Preceded by Nikki Phillipp	Miss District of Columbia USA; 1971	Succeeded by Janet Greenawalt
Preceded by Linda Gialanella	Miss New Jersey; 1973	Succeeded by Elizabeth Bracken
Nevada Senate
Preceded by Jack Vergiels	Member of the Nevada Senate from the Clark 3 district 1993–1997	Succeeded by Valerie Wiener
