= Valerie Wiener =

American politician (born 1948)

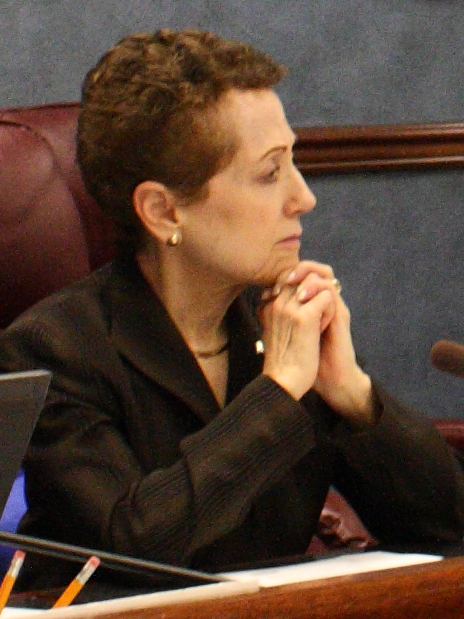
- Wiener in 2011

Member of the Nevada Senate from the Clark 3 district
- In office 1996–2012
- Preceded by: Sue Lowden
- Succeeded by: Tick Segerblom

Personal details
- Born: October 30, 1948 (age 77) Las Vegas, Nevada
- Party: Democratic
- Spouse: Divorced
- Profession: Positioning Strategist, Author, Publisher, Consultant, Speaker

Valerie Wiener (born October 30, 1948) was a Democratic member of the Nevada Senate, representing Clark County District 3 (map) from 1996 through 2012.
