= Archon Corporation =

American entertainment company

- Formerly: Hacienda Resorts, Inc. Santa Fe Corporation; Sahara Gaming Corporation; Santa Fe Gaming Corporation
- Type: Public
- Traded as: Expert Market: ARHN
- Industry: Gaming
- Founded: 1983; 43 years ago
- Headquarters: Laughlin, Nevada, United States
- Key people: Paul W. Lowden (CEO)

Archon Corporation is an entertainment company based in Laughlin, Nevada. The company has owned casinos and water parks. Members of board of directors include State Senator Sue Lowden who was chairwoman of the Nevada Republican Party and State Senator Bill Raggio. Lowden is also executive vice president, secretary and treasurer for the company.

== History ==
=== Hacienda Resorts ===
The company began in 1983 as Hacienda Resorts, Inc., owner of the Hacienda Casino.

=== Name Changes ===
The company was first renamed Santa Fe Corporation and later renamed again to the Sahara Gaming Corporation. Sahara Gaming attempted to sell 40 acres (16 ha) of land to Players International in 1994. The deal fell through on February 7, 1995.

=== Santa Fe Gaming ===
Santa Fe Valley was announced in 1994, and construction was expected to begin in July 1996. The start of construction was delayed several times because of poor financial quarters for Santa Fe Gaming and because of the company not yet receiving financing for the project. Site preparation started in July 1998, with an opening date scheduled for December 1999, but construction never began. In 1999, the property was sold to Station Casinos, which sold the land a year later for use as a shopping center.

In 1995, the Hacienda was sold to Circus Circus Enterprises and the Sahara Hotel and Casino was sold to William Bennett. Followed by a rename to Santa Fe Gaming Corporation.

In 2000, the Santa Fe Casino was sold to Station Casinos.

=== Archon ===
The company changed its name to Archon Corp. in May 2001.

In March 2013, Boston-based private equity firm Esplanade Capital, Archon's second-largest shareholder, offered to buy the company for $101.5 million. Lowden dismissed the proposal as "not really a serious" offer.

Chris Lowden, son of Paul Lowden and step-son of Sue Lowden, is currently being sued by investors for fraud and racketeering within the Stoney's Rockin' Country organization. The Stoney's trademark is currently owned by Archon Corporation

== Assets ==
- Commercial office buildings in Dorchester, Massachusetts
- Commercial office buildings in Gaithersburg, Maryland
- Stoney's Rockin' Country Trademark

=== Former ===
- Pioneer Hotel & Gambling Hall
- Hacienda
- Sahara Hotel and Casino
- Sahara Tahoe
- Sahara Reno
- Santa Fe Casino
- Wet 'n Wild
