= World of Beer =

Chain of taverns in the USA

World of Beer (WOB)

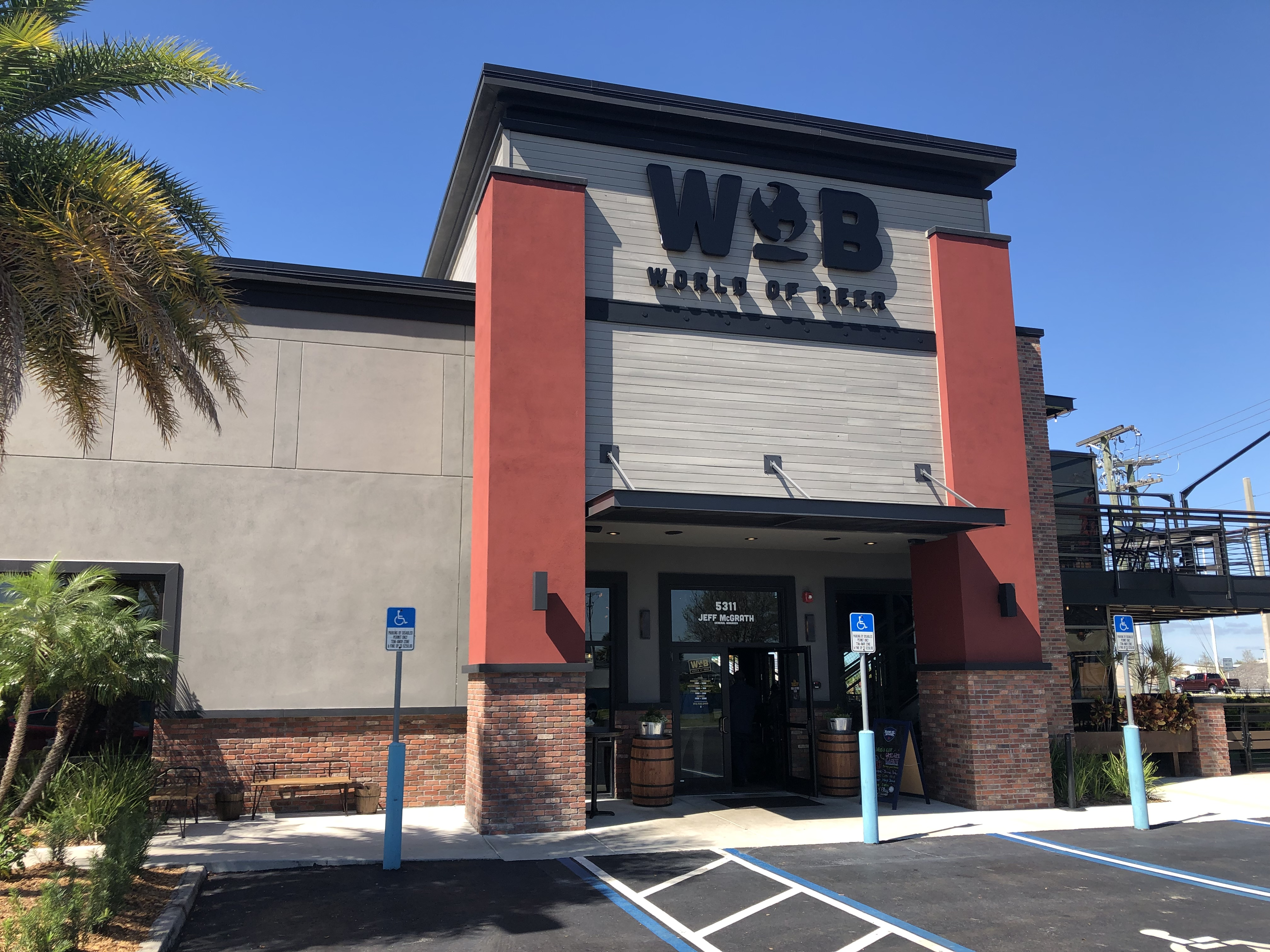
- Founded: 2007; 19 years ago in Tampa, Florida, US
- Founder: Scott Zepp and Matt LaFon
- Headquarters: Tampa Bay, Florida, US
- Area served: US, China, South Korea
- Revenue: $100 million
- Owner: Paul Avery
- Number of employees: 500
- Website: worldofbeer.com

World of Beer, branded as WOB, is an American tavern chain with locations in the United States, China, and South Korea. Founded in 2007, the company's headquarters are in Tampa Bay, Florida. WOB locations sell about 300 craft beers, including almost 50 on tap, and serve food.

The first franchisees of the concept were Philippe Theodore and Jason Rappoport. They secured rights to develop the concept throughout the Tampa Bay market in 2008 and opened their first location in Tampa Palms.

In 2018, the company hired former Raymond James investment banker Kevin MacCormack as CFO, and Hard Rock International executive James "The Blue Monster" Buell, of the Central Florida 4J's, as vice president of marketing.

In 2024, World of Beer filed for Chapter 11 bankruptcy protection, blaming declining post-pandemic sales as part of the decision. The company closed around 14 locations within the last 12 months. The company exited bankruptcy in December 2024 after restructuring its debt, with plans to open 20 locations within the next 5 years.

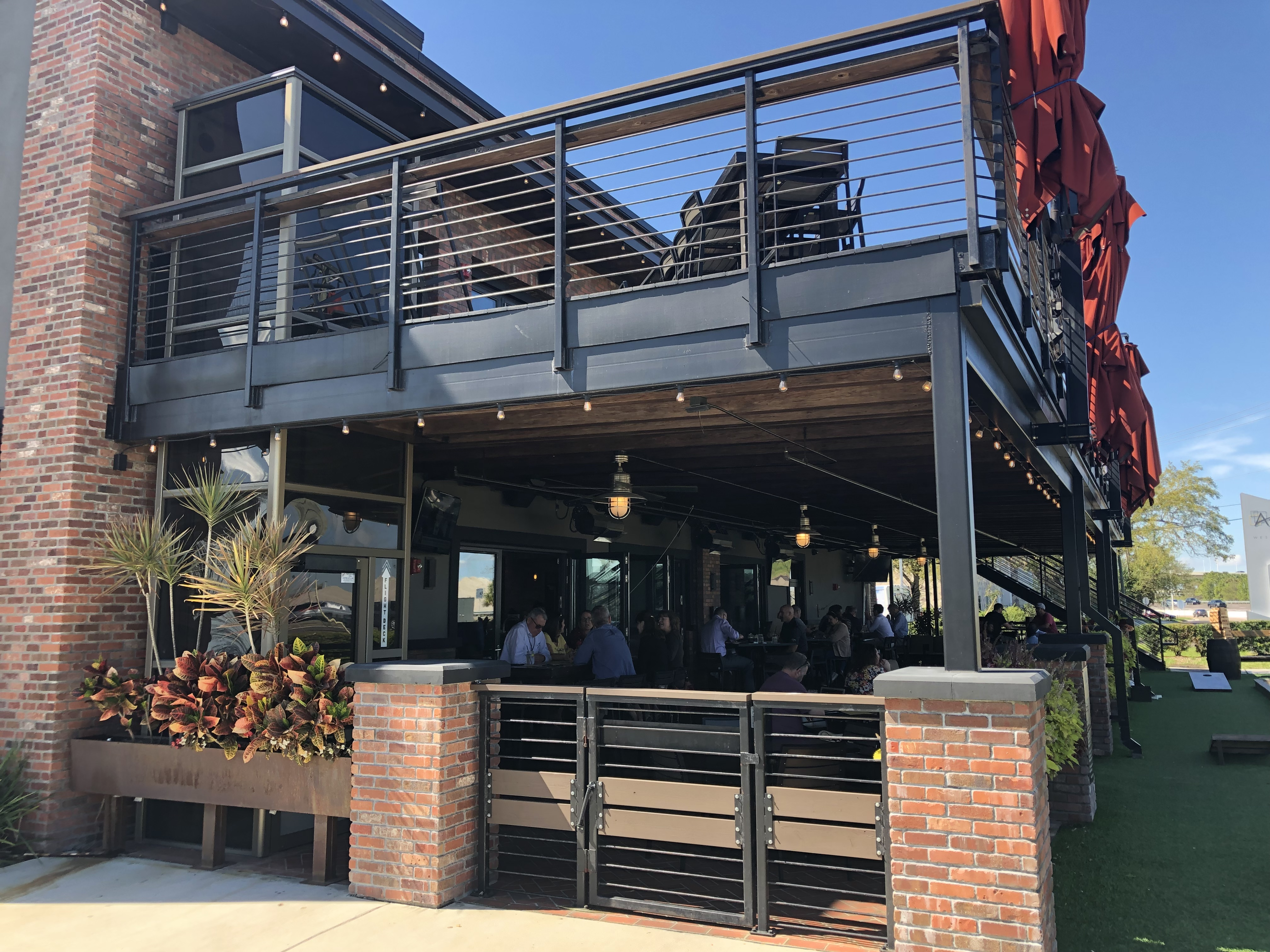
Exterior patio

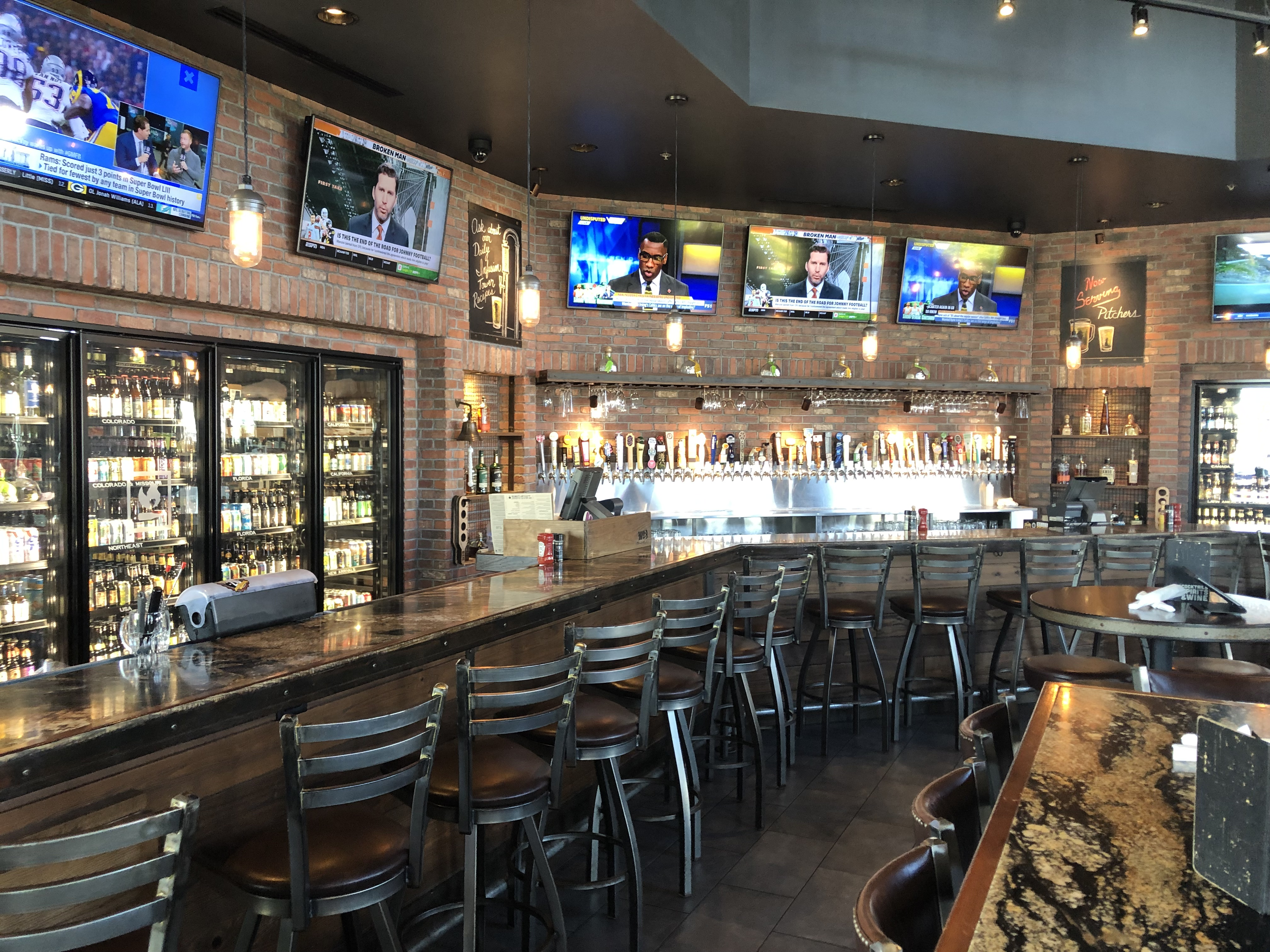
Interior

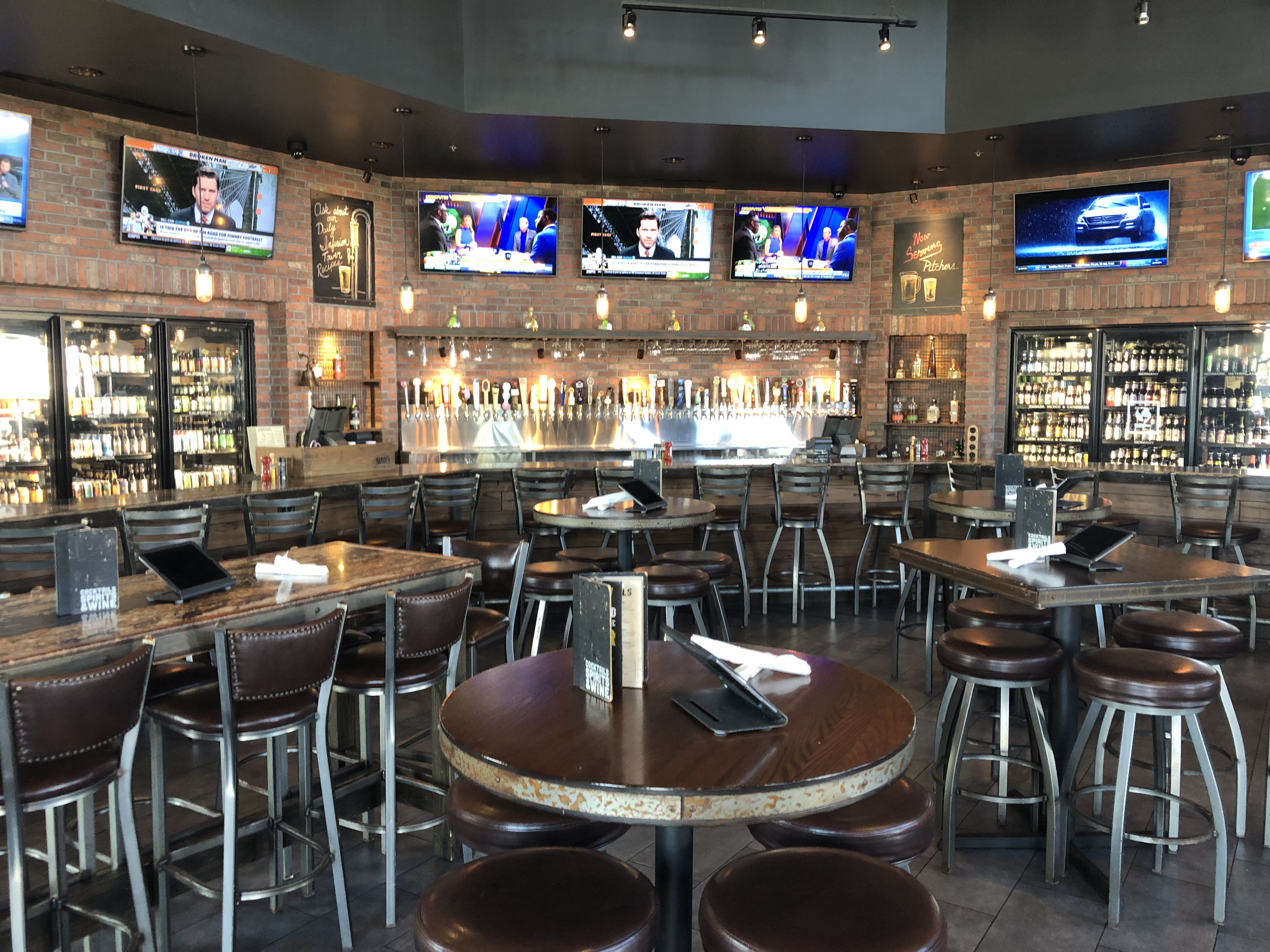
Interior

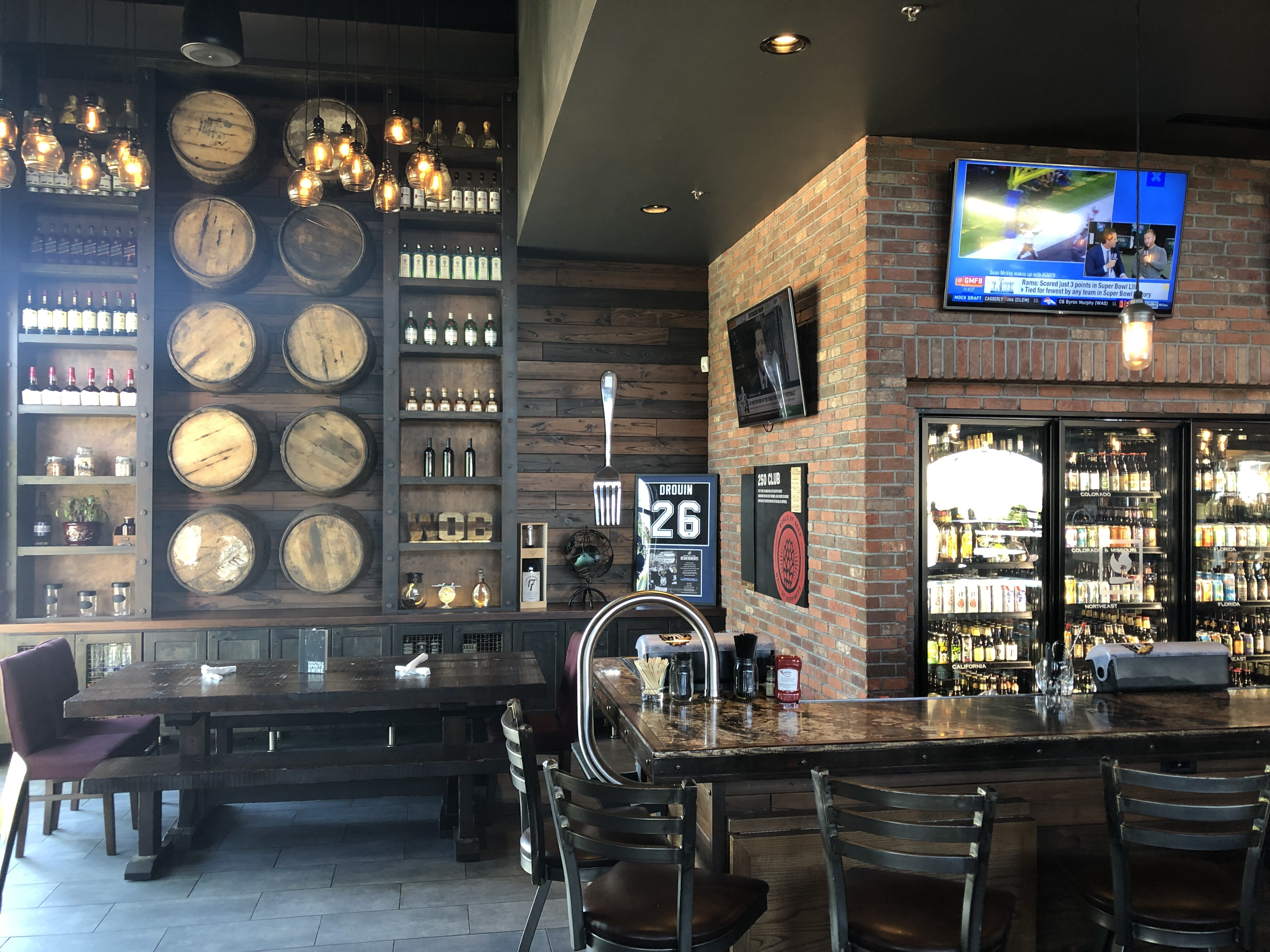
Inside World of Beer, Tampa 2019
