= List of Las Vegas Strip hotels =

The following is a list of hotels located on the Las Vegas Strip.

== List of hotels ==
Current hotels on the Las Vegas Strip
Name	Image	Rooms	Opened	Operator	Theme	Architect	Geographic order	Notes
Flamingo; 3555 Las Vegas Boulevard South		3,460	December 26, 1946	Caesars Entertainment	Not themed	Richard R. Stadelman	Center strip	1946 – Flamingo; 1971 – Flamingo Hilton; 2000 – Flamingo Las Vegas; The last of the original 1946 buildings was demolished in 1993. The remaining hotel buildings date to the 1970s and later.
Sahara; 2535 Las Vegas Boulevard South		1,616	October 7, 1952	Meruelo Group	Sahara Desert	Max Maltzman	North strip	1952 – Sahara; August 23, 2014 – SLS; August 29, 2019 – Renamed Sahara
The Linq; 3535 Las Vegas Boulevard South		2,250	1959	Caesars Entertainment	Orientalism (as Imperial Palace) Not themed (current)	Merlin J. Barth (Imperial Palace)	Center strip	1959 – Flamingo Capri; November 1, 1979 – Imperial Palace; December 21, 2012 – The Quad; October 30, 2014 – The LINQ
Caesars Palace; 3570 Las Vegas Boulevard South		3,960	August 5, 1966	Caesars Entertainment	Roman Empire	Jay Sarno (original hotel); Bergman Walls Associates (extensions)	Center strip	Includes Nobu Hotel Las Vegas
Circus Circus; 2880 Las Vegas Boulevard South		3,767	October 18, 1968	Phil Ruffin	Circus	Rissman and Rissman Associates	North strip	
Harrah's; 3475 Las Vegas Boulevard South		2,542	July 2, 1973	Caesars Entertainment	Carnival; Mardi Gras	Rissman and Rissman Associates	Center strip	1973 – Holiday Casino; 1992 – Harrah's
Horseshoe; 3645 Las Vegas Boulevard South		2,056	December 4, 1973	Caesars Entertainment	Western	Martin Stern Jr.	Center strip	1973 – MGM Grand; 1986 – Bally's; 2022 – Horseshoe
Casino Royale Hotel & Casino; 3411 Las Vegas Boulevard South		152	July 1978	Tom Elardi	European		Center strip	1978 – Nob Hill; 1992 – Casino Royale
The Vanderpump; 3595 Las Vegas Boulevard South		188	March 2, 1979	Caesars Entertainment	French		Center strip	1979 – Barbary Coast; March 1, 2007 – Bill's Gamblin' Hall and Saloon; April 21, 2014 – The Cromwell; June 11, 2026 – The Vanderpump
Excalibur; 3850 Las Vegas Boulevard South		3,981	June 19, 1990	MGM Resorts International	Medieval Europe		South strip	
Luxor; 3900 Las Vegas Boulevard South		4,407	October 15, 1993	MGM Resorts International	Ancient Egypt	Veldon Simpson	South strip	
Treasure Island (TI); 3300 Las Vegas Boulevard South		2,885	October 26, 1993	Phil Ruffin	Pirates	Joel Bergman; Jon Jerde	North strip	
MGM Grand; 3799 Las Vegas Boulevard South		4,762	December 18, 1993	MGM Resorts International	Not themed		South strip	1975 – Marina Hotel and Casino (which is currently the Studio Tower); 1989 – MGM-Marina; December 18, 1993 – MGM Grand; Includes The Signature at MGM Grand
The Strat; 2000 Las Vegas Boulevard South		2,427	April 30, 1996	Golden Entertainment	Outer space (as Vegas World)	Ned Baldwin	North strip	1979 – Vegas World; April 30, 1996 – Stratosphere; 2020 – The Strat
Park MGM; 3770 Las Vegas Boulevard South		2,993	June 21, 1996	MGM Resorts International	Not themed		South strip	1996 – Monte Carlo; May 9, 2018 – Park MGM
New York-New York; 3790 Las Vegas Boulevard South		2,024	January 3, 1997	MGM Resorts International	New York City	Neal Gaskin; Ilia Bezansky	South strip	
Bellagio; 3600 Las Vegas Boulevard South		3,933	October 15, 1998	MGM Resorts International	Bellagio, Italy	Jon Jerde; Atlandia Design	Center strip	
Mandalay Bay; 3950 Las Vegas Boulevard South		3,209	March 2, 1999	MGM Resorts International	Tropical		South strip	Includes Four Seasons and W
The Venetian; 3355 Las Vegas Boulevard South		4,049	May 3, 1999	Apollo Global Management	Venice, Italy	KlingStubbins	North strip	InterContinental – Alliance Resort
Paris; 3655 Las Vegas Boulevard South		3,672	September 1, 1999	Caesars Entertainment	Paris, France	Leidenfrost/Horowitz & Associates; Bergman, Walls & Associates; MBH Architects	Center strip	
Planet Hollywood; 3667 Las Vegas Boulevard South		2,494	August 18, 2000	Caesars Entertainment	Arabian (as Aladdin) Hollywood (current)		Center strip	August 18, 2000 – Aladdin; April 17, 2007 – Planet Hollywood
Wynn; 3131 Las Vegas Boulevard South		2,716	April 28, 2005	Wynn Resorts	Not themed	Marnell Corrao Associates	North strip	
The Palazzo; 3325 Las Vegas Boulevard South		3,066	December 30, 2007	Apollo Global Management	Italian	HKS, Inc.	North strip	InterContinental – Alliance Resort; Part of The Venetian
Encore; 3121 Las Vegas Boulevard South		2,034	December 22, 2008	Wynn Resorts	Not themed	Wimberly Allison Tong & Goo; Michael Hong	North strip	Part of Wynn
CityCenter; 3730 Las Vegas Boulevard South		5,888	December 16, 2009	MGM Resorts International	Not themed	Pelli Clarke Pelli (Aria); Rafael Viñoly (Vdara); Kohn Pedersen Fox (Waldorf Astoria)	Center strip	Consist of 3 hotels: Aria, Vdara, and Waldorf Astoria
Cosmopolitan; 3708 Las Vegas Boulevard South		3,033	December 15, 2010	MGM Resorts International	Not themed	Friedmutter Group; Arquitectonica	Center strip	
Resorts World; 3000 Las Vegas Boulevard South		3,506	June 24, 2021	Genting Group	East Asian	Steelman Partners	North strip	Includes 3 towers: Hilton, Conrad, and Crockfords
Fontainebleau; 2777 Las Vegas Boulevard South		3,644	December 13, 2023	Fontainebleau Development	Bow tie	Carlos Zapata Studio	North strip	
Hard Rock; 3400 Las Vegas Boulevard South		3,700	2027	Hard Rock International	Rock and roll		Center strip	Under construction
Bally's; 3801 Las Vegas Boulevard South		3,000	TBA	Bally's Corporation	TBA		South strip	
Dream; 5051 Las Vegas Boulevard South		531	TBA	Dream Hotels Group	TBA	DLR Group	South strip	Under construction

== See also ==
- Lists of hotels
