= WCW Nitro Grill =

Restaurant information
- Established: May 22, 1999
- Closed: September 30, 2000
- Previous owners: Sitka Restaurant Group, World Championship Wrestling
- Food type: Steakhouse
- Location: Las Vegas, United States
- Seating capacity: 350

WCW Nitro Grill was an American professional wrestling-themed steakhouse owned by World Championship Wrestling (WCW) that opened on May 22, 1999 at the Excalibur Hotel and Casino in Paradise, Nevada. It was built at a cost of $2 million. Professional wrestlers frequented the restaurant when they were touring in Las Vegas. The restaurant hosted weekly watch parties for WCW Monday Nitro and WCW Thunder as well as occasional autograph signings with members of the WCW roster. It closed on September 30, 2000 just six months before most of WCW's holdings were sold to the World Wrestling Federation (WWF, now WWE) in 2001. The dining room was 16,000 square feet and could seat 350 people. After the Las Vegas location opened, there were tentative plans to open more Nitro Grills across the United States, although none were ever announced.

The former Nitro location in Las Vegas is now currently occupied by Dick's Last Resort, a chain of bars and restaurants in the United States with 12 locations in 7 states.

== See also ==
- WWF New York
- WWE Niagara Falls
- Ribera Steakhouse
- Dropkick Bar
