= Australia's Thunder from Down Under =

Australian male revue

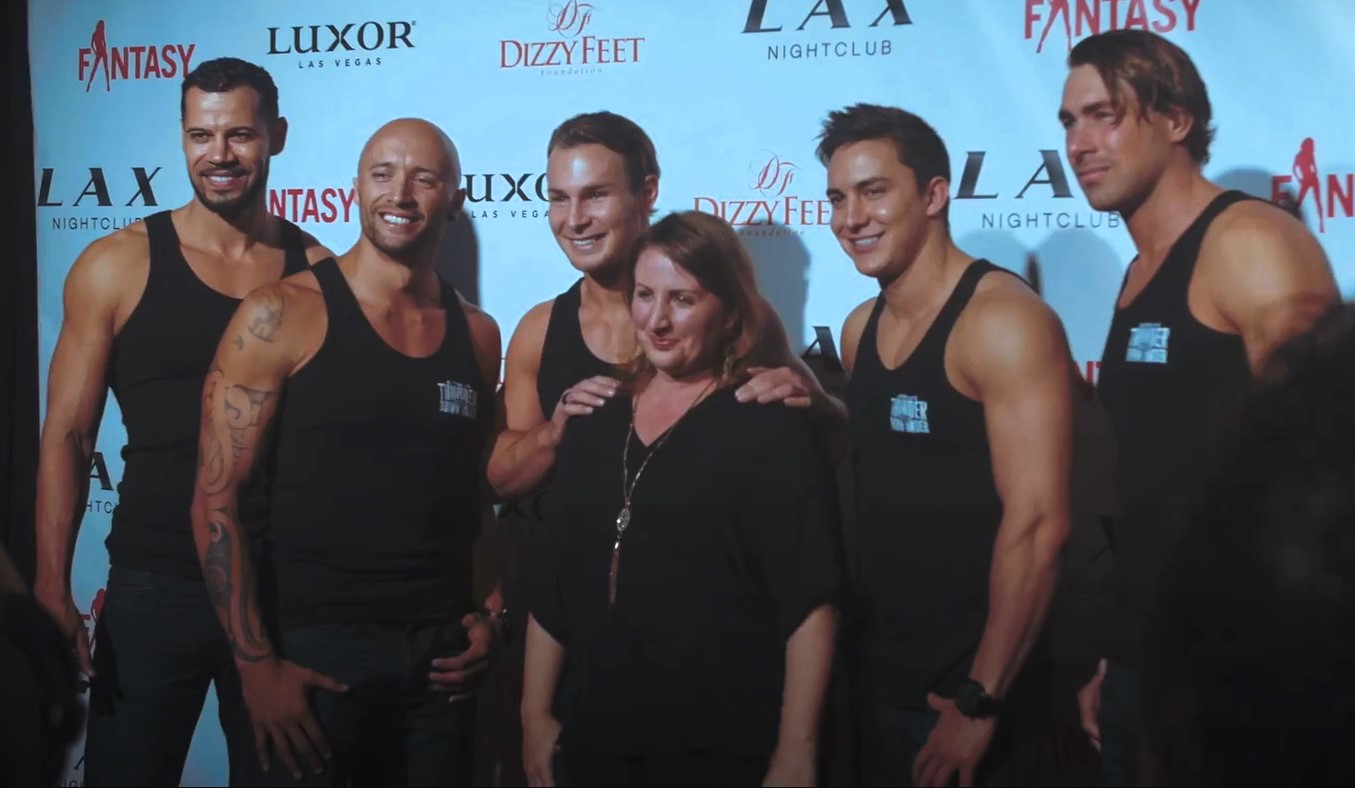
- Thunder From Down Under in 2015
- Formation: 1991
- Type: Theatre group
- Location: Australia, New York City, Los Angeles, Las Vegas

Australia's Thunder from Down Under is an Australian male revue who perform in Las Vegas and tour internationally. The show is a 90-minute, interactive performance with choreographed dance and flashing lights. Their main competitor is Chippendales. The show is co-owned by Adam Steck and founder Billy Cross.

Since its debut in 1991, nearly 10 million people have watched them perform. Originally, the show uses the Australian practice of no tipping as a way to attract audiences. Their first show was in an old theater in The Frontier in '01 and booked a show in the Excalibur Hotel in '02. Since then, Thunder has toured over 15 countries including Russia, England, Canada, South Africa, Europe, New Zealand, Australia, Mexico, Ireland and, in 2017, will be headed to Thailand and China as well.

Each year, the group releases an annual calendar featuring the dancers and releases a documentary of the shoot.

== Notable mentions ==
Thunder from Down Under has also been featured on several television shows, including Today, The Tyra Banks Show, E!'s Top 12 Sexiest Vegas Shows, The View, Gene Simmons Family Jewels, Drop Dead Diva, Project Runway, Impractical Jokers, and Holey Moley.

AOL'City Guide named them as "Best Adult Attraction of 2006 and 2007". The Las Vegas Review-Journal named them "Best Male Revue in 2006 and 2007".

The show was voted "Best Male Strip Show" in the 2011 Review-Journal Poll: Best of Last Vegas and was the 2011 Readers' choice and newspaper staff pick.

== Las Vegas residency ==
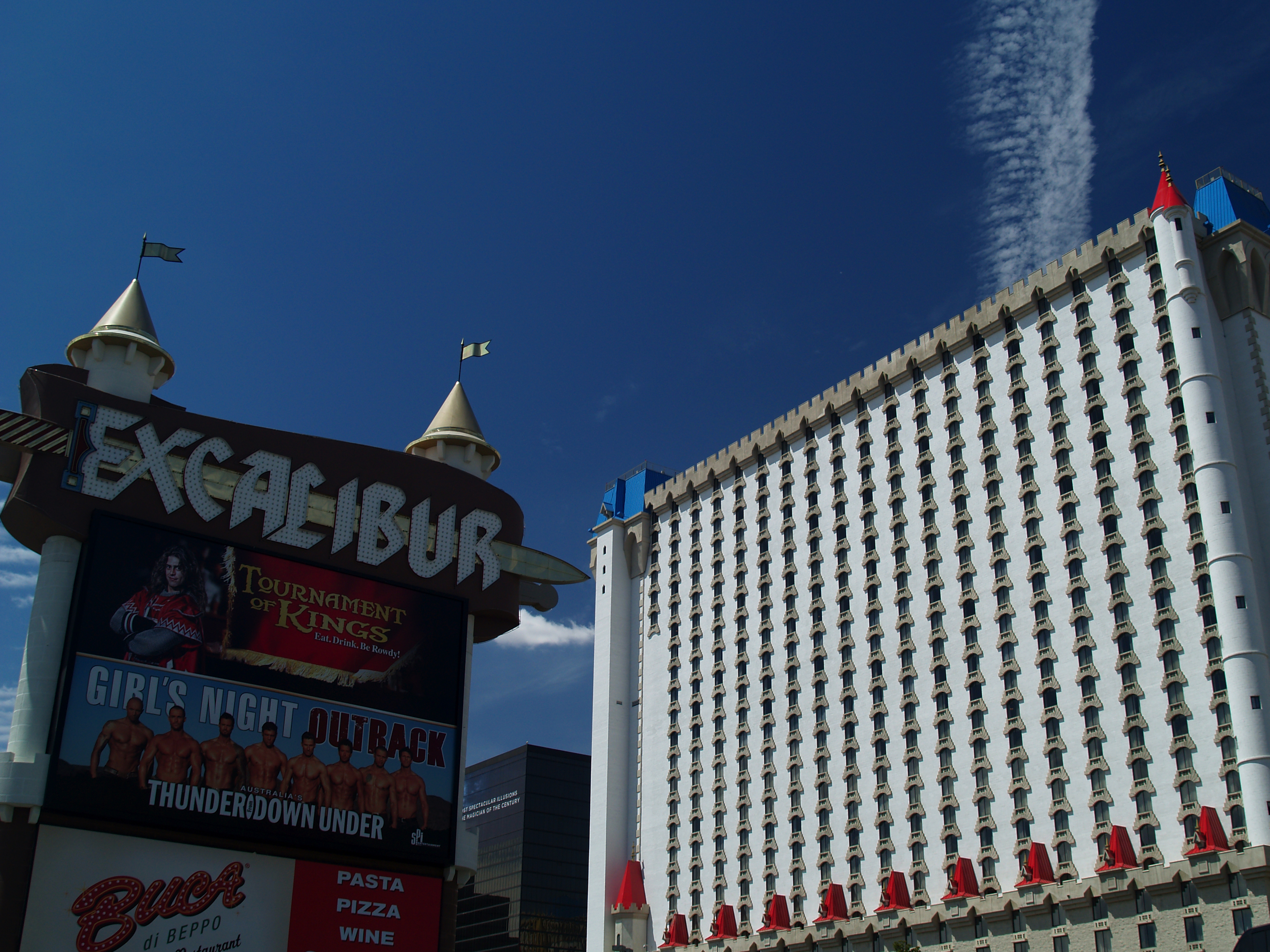
Thunder from Down Under signage at Excalibur Hotel & Casino

In 2001, the show officially moved into the Excalibur Hotel and Casino. In 2006, the showroom was officially renamed The Thunder from Down Under Showroom in their honor and has 400 seats. Currently, they hold 12 shows per week.

== In popular culture ==
They made a brief PG-rated appearance dancing to "Need You Tonight" in the 2014 Disney comedy Alexander and the Terrible, Horrible, No Good, Very Bad Day.

On the TV show Impractical Jokers, Murr was forced to perform with the Thunder from Down Under men on stage while covered in rashes caused by being exposed to histamines before the show.

== See also ==
- Chippendales
- Dreamboys
