= Tournament of Kings =

Medieval-themed dinner show

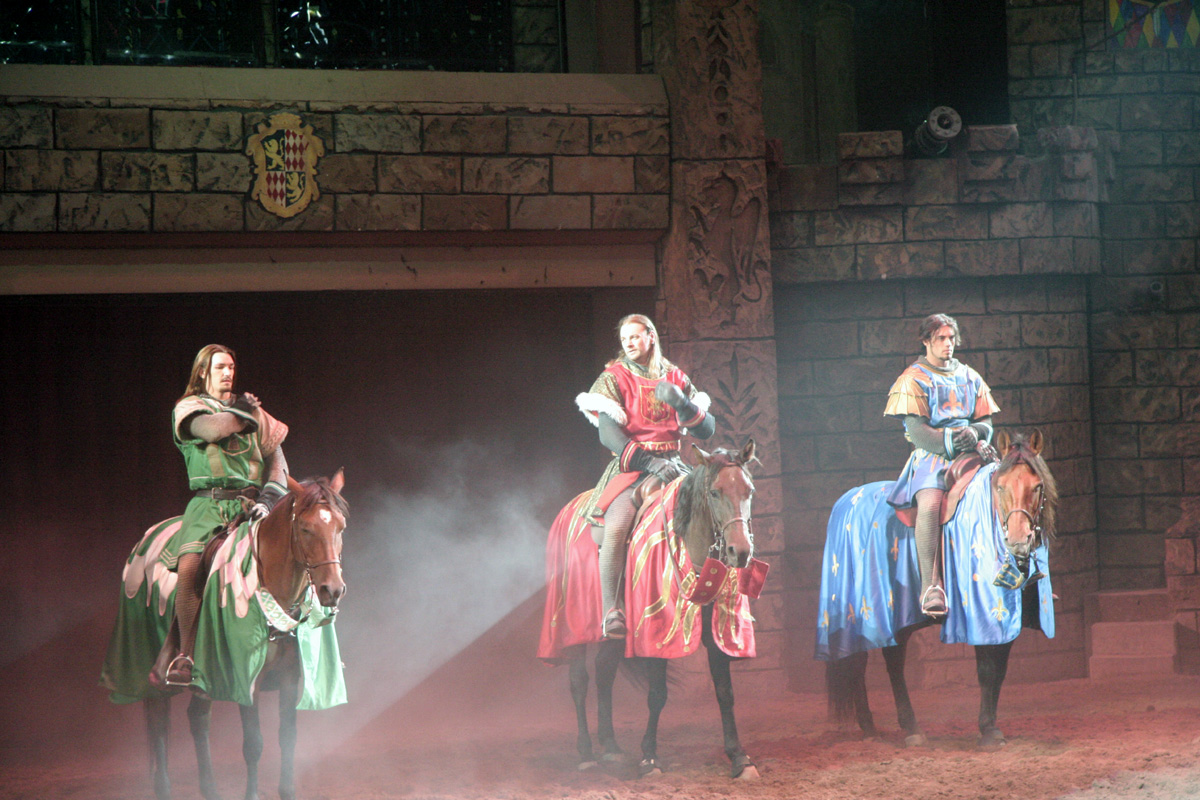
- Kings on horseback during the 2006 performance
- Genre: Medieval
- Show type: resident
- Date of premiere: June 19, 1993
- Location: Excalibur Hotel and Casino, Las Vegas Strip

Creative team
- Producer: Peter Jackson
- Producer: Patrick Jackson
- Writer: Doug Baker
- Director: Phil Shelburne
- Stunt coordinator: Ivan Caulier
- Official website

Tournament of Kings (ToK; formerly known as King Arthur's Tournament) is a medieval-themed dinner show performed on the Las Vegas Strip at the Excalibur Hotel and Casino. Opened in June 1990, Tournament of Kings was the third-longest running show on the Las Vegas Strip in 2018.

As Excalibur Hotel and Casino was being architected, owner Circus Circus Enterprises's entertainment director Mike Hartzell wanted to install a show that fit the hotel's medieval theme. Inspired by watching Medieval Times in Los Angeles, Hartzell enlisted the father-and-son producer duo Peter and Patrick Jackson to create a jousting show. The Jacksons hired Doug Baker to play the main character Merlin and to write the script. King Arthur's Tournament opened in June 1990 at the Excalibur. After running for about 6,000 performances, the show closed in January 1999 and reopened the next month with a new name, Tournament of Kings. The new show featured a new script written by Baker, upgraded costumes, and a modernized set. The show is directed to families, and its cast members encourage audience participation.

Tournament of Kings is a dinner show where audience members are served a three-course meal featuring a Cornish game hen. Diners are typically not given utensils. In the show, King Arthur asks eight European kings to participate in a sporting contest to celebrate Christopher, his son. Riding horses, the kings engage in jousting and Capture the Flag. King Arthur's enemy, Mordred arrives and kills the king. The show uses a large amount of pyrotechnics as Mordred and Christopher fight. Christopher vanquishes Mordred and is crowned king.

== History ==
=== Origins ===
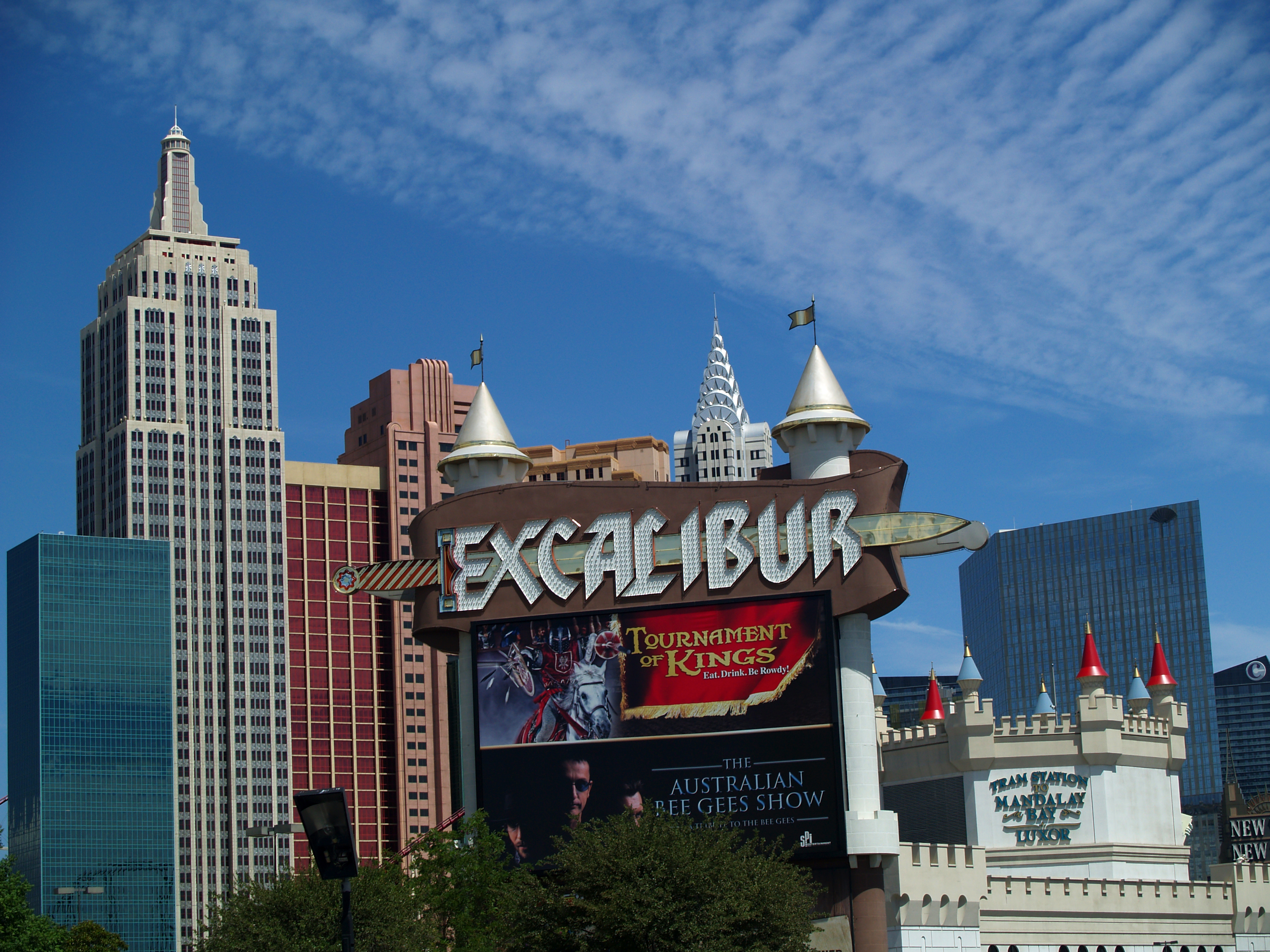
Excalibur Hotel and Casino in 2012, advertising Tournament of Kings on a billboard in the foreground

Excalibur Hotel and Casino's architects envisioned a design where the hotel's basement would have two movie theaters and a miniature golf course. Entertainment director Mike Hartzell, who had worked at Circus Circus since 1968, vigorously pushed for putting a show in the basement over putting Sherwood Forest Miniature Golf Course there. Circus performances would have been a mismatch with Excalibur's medieval design so were ruled out. Hartzell's friend advised him to travel to Los Angeles to check out Medieval Times, a dinner show featuring knights jousting. Although Hartzell wanted a Medieval Times at Excalibur, Circus Circus Enterprises could not reach an understanding with the show's owners. To occupy Excalibur's basement with a new jousting show, Hartzell signed a contract with the father-and-son duo Peter and Patrick Jackson to produce that show solely for the hotel.

After Utah-based actor Doug Baker's friend suggested to the Jacksons that they consider him, the Jacksons said they wanted a professional actor such as someone who was based in New York or Los Angeles. Despite not being particularly motivated by the opportunity, Baker sought it because he was irate about the producers' requirements. Every week, he made two phone calls and penned one letter asking for an audition, convincing the Jacksons to accede to his request. Between 1985 and 1989, Baker had been the writer, the director, and a cast member of Utah Shakespeare Festival's Royal Feaste, an Elizabethan era show. In his audition for the Jacksons, he showcased vocal and character demos inspired by his experience at the Royal Feaste. The Jacksons notified him after two days that they wanted him for the role which he accepted. The show had a scenario and a list of characters but no script, so Baker offered to pen one for King Arthur's Tournament while rehearsing for his role as Merlin.

The Royal Feaste and King Arthur's Tournament have a number of parallels. The two are theatrical dinner shows that serve roasted hen as the main course and do not give customers utensils. The two cost roughly the same in 1995 and encourage audience participation. They have dissimilarities as well. The Royal Feaste is set in the Tudor period, while King Arthur's Tournament is set in the Middle Ages. The Royal Feaste is a more conventional show, while King Arthur's Tournament features special effects in large quantities such as lasers and fog.

=== King Arthur's Tournament ===
King Arthur's Tournament started having shows at the Excalibur on June 19, 1990, and routinely filled all seats. Doug Baker wrote the show's story. Spending $300,000, the show purchased handmade costumes from England for the 40-member cast. The sumptuous embroidered costumes were designed by the Frenchman Michel Fresnay which Michael Paskevich of the Las Vegas Review-Journal said "captured the spirit of the day". The show used 3,000 special effects including fireworks as well as 40 cast members and 22 horses.

Peter Jackson co-produced the show until kidney failure led to his death on December 30, 1998. Patrick Jackson, Peter's son, became the show's producer following Peter's death. He had worked behind his father for nearly a quarter of a century, described his father as having difficulty in deputization of work. Patrick Jackson said, "It's almost like he didn't want me to be in front. 'I'd say I had an idea and he'd say, 'Oh, that won't work.' Then, two weeks later he'd say, 'I've got this great idea.' And it was the same idea." Excalibur contracts the show to Jackson via an independent production company, so contract extensions can be intricate discussions. After King Arthur's Tournament ran for about 6,000 performances, its run ended on January 3, 1999. The show was supposed to undergo no adjustments for two years but Excalibur owner Circus Circus Enterprises decided to make the changes before the opening of the new casino Mandalay Bay. With new Las Vegas Strip casinos opening, Circus Circus Enterprises wanted to upgrade King Arthur's Tournament while it was still doing well.

=== Tournament of Kings ===
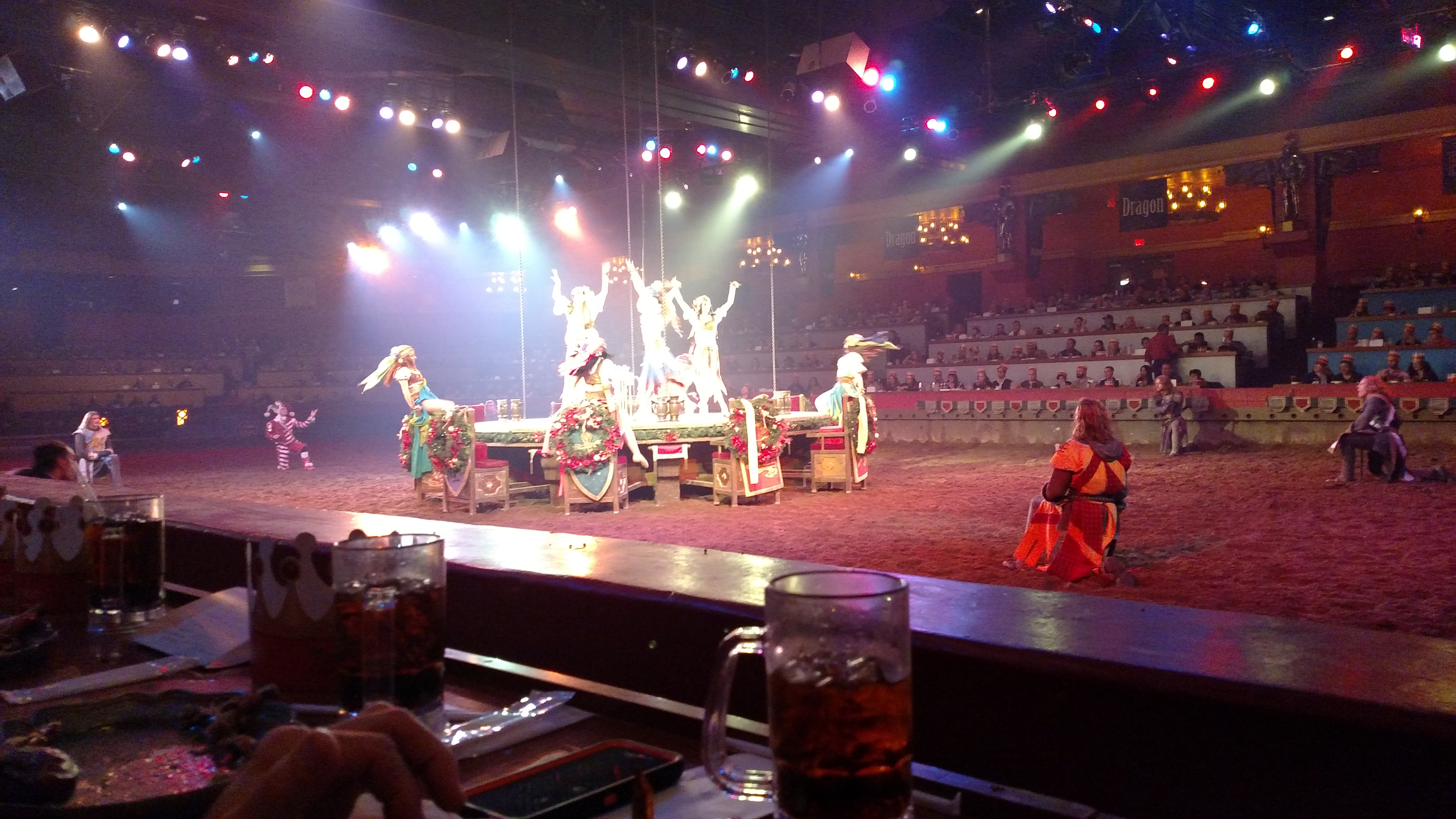
Performers at the Round Table during the 2018 performance

After undergoing an overhaul, King Arthur's Tournament was rebranded to Tournament of Kings and started doing shows again on February 4, 1999. The creative team had been readying Tournament of Kings for almost a year. Patrick Jackson was the new show's producer. Following a $1.2 million upgrade, the show had a revamped arena, a modernized set, and opulent costumes. An additional $1 million went to other changes. The show's 1999 renovation resulted in new chandeliers, fresh carpets, and fresh paint. The venue installed gargoyles and redesigned the layout so that the audience members could no longer see the stations where the food was heated. Plastic benches were supplanted by upholstered furniture, and an improved setup for lighting and sound was installed. To accommodate people who are disabled, the venue installed an elevator. Previously, the performers went in and out of the arena through a small black curtain. The renovated arena replaced the curtain with a stone castle containing turrets and parapets on which the antagonistist Mordred hurls flames and the cast clashes using swords. Gregory Crane designed the set. Ivan Caulier served as stunt coordinator, a role he had done since the show's 1990 premiere. The cast members took acting classes to make their performances more realistic.

Doug Baker, who originated the Merlin role in 1990, continued in his role and authored the story of the renamed show. Phil Shelburne became the Tournament of Kings director. He was a former Excalibur puppeteer, a King Arthur's Tournament cast member, and a director of several community shows. Peter Jackson originally intended to be the director but advised Patrick to choose Shelburne as director if Peter could not do it. Shelburne made the show "more theatrical" by having a clearer story and more action. Saying he wanted to "do other things" and work on his acting career, Baker left the show in 2003 after performing as Merlin in nearly 9,000 shows.

Mike Weatherford of the Las Vegas Review-Journal said the revamped show was influenced by television shows and video games, citing how the helmets worn by the Dragon Knight and his aides appear to be influenced by Mortal Kombat. He compared the "beefed-up fantasy and action" to the popular television shows Hercules: The Legendary Journeys and Xena: Warrior Princess. The new iteration had "a rougher, more realistic look to its costumes and even a welcome bit of plot and personality", Weatherfield said. Michael Paskevich of the Las Vegas Review-Journal found the money put into the upgrade to be effective as seats routinely were completely filled.

After MGM Mirage acquired Mandalay Bay in 2005, there was talk that Cirque du Soleil, which is an MGM partner, would replace Tournament of Kings with their own show. The rumor was that Cirque du Soleil employees had taken measurements of the Tournament of Kings' dirt field. The whisper of a takeover simmered down by 2010 since physical obstructions prevented the venue from being enlarged. An expansion would be too costly. The show previously had 14 showings, seven days a week. On 7 February 2006, the number of shows was reduced to 12 every week with performers taking Tuesdays off.

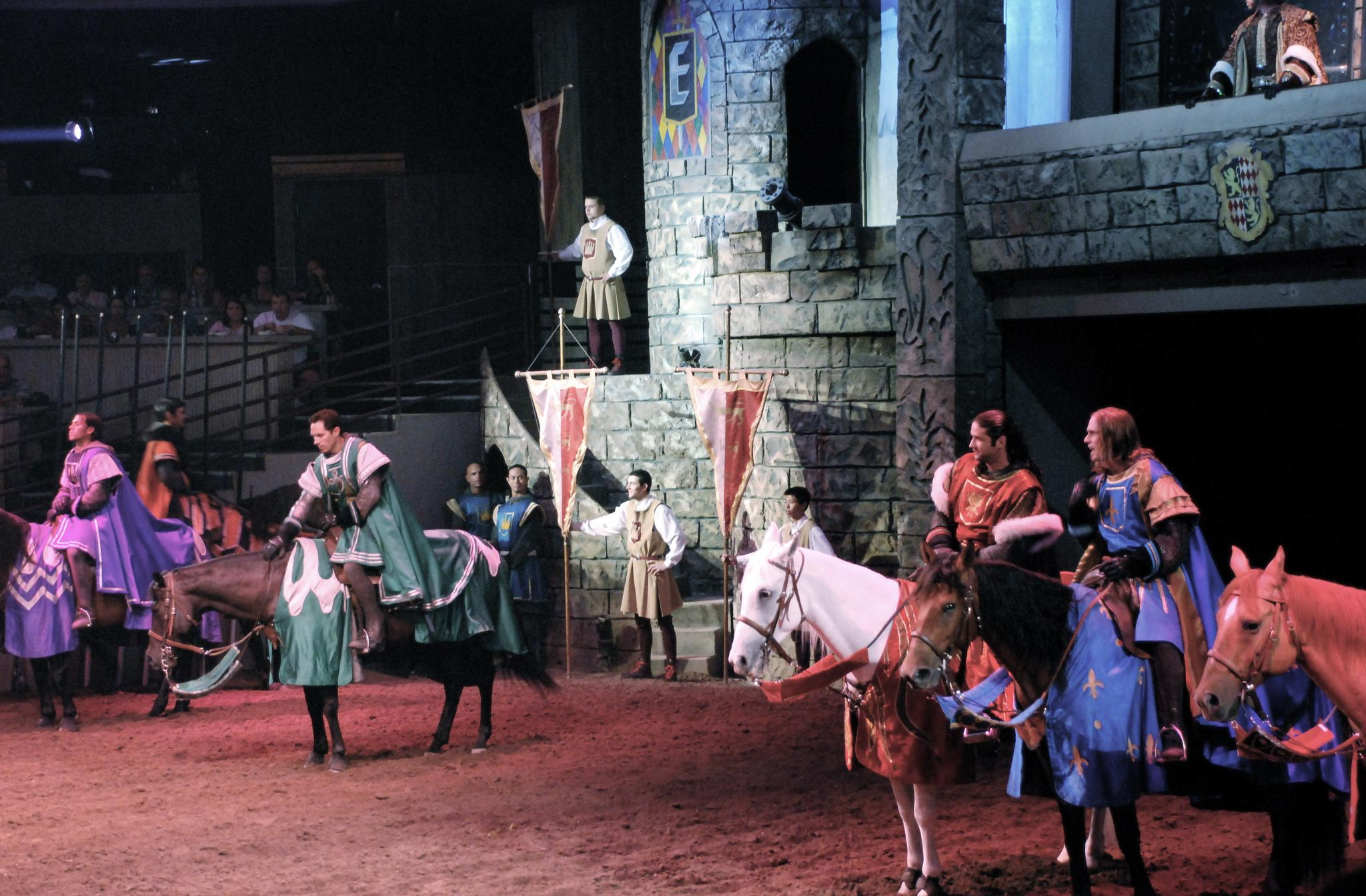
2018 performance

As the show hit its 20th anniversary in June 2010, Tournament of King was the Las Vegas Strip's fourth-longest running show, the sole show to have a theme aligned with the property it was housed in, and the only Las Vegas show to have horses. Through a castle-shaped cake that weighed 300 pounds, the show's cast and crew celebrated the occasion. Felix Rappaport, Excalibur's president, said that over seven million audience members had watched the show, which had been put on 12,300 times. That anniversary year, Patrick Jackson wanted to spend $6 million on improving the show. He hoped to spend about $1.5 million to upgrade the set, add improved lighting, and design new costumes as well as $5 million for a completely new idea. Unenthusiastic about the $5 million proposal, MGM needed to make its determination on investments and a contract extension by the close of 2010. The show's continuation was in a state of uncertainty for a few years since Excalibur had been unable to make a decision. That uncertainty ended in 2012, the year the show underwent its first significant upgrade since its 1999 renovation. The show revamped its lighting, introduced new costumes, and renovated its set. Although predecessor King Arthur's Tournament had women horseback riders, Tournament of Kings did not have its first woman horseback rider until 2014.

Rumors about the show's closing continued and were so pervasive that the company issued a statement in 2016, "We normally don't comment on rumors but we want to assure our employees and our guests that we have no plans to close (it)." Since the first barn would have interfered with Excalibar's newly constructed parking garage, Excalibur created a second barn at the end of 2016 to house the show's horses. Owing to the COVID-19 pandemic, Tournament of Kings paused doing performances in March 2020. During the closure, the horses were relocated to a ranch from their previous location at the hotel's barn. To prepare for its reopening on July 14, 2021, the show brought the horses back to the hotel for a month of training. Tournament of Kings was the third-longest running show on the Las Vegas Strip in 2018—the shows Legends in Concert and Crazy Girls had launched before Tournament of Kings in 1983 and 1987, respectively. Lisa Bornstein of the Rocky Mountain News said that Tournament of Kings was the Las Vegas version of Medieval Times and Renaissance fairs, while Herald & Review's Bob Fallstrom found it to be "a fantasy twist" on Buffalo Bill's Wild West shows.

== Venue ==
The dinner show takes place at Excalibur Hotel's King Arthur's Arena, which is shaped like a horseshoe and encloses a dirt field where the performance happens. The arena is 120 by 60 feet (37 m × 18 m). Lisa Bornstein of Rocky Mountain News found the dirt field to be similar to the arenas at rodeos. To give more padding, the stage is caked with synthetic fibers and soil. A Round Table settles into the middle of the arena. Split into 10 sections, the venue seats 900 and is located next to an arcade and downstairs from the casino.

== Synopsis ==
King Arthur's Tournament was about a youthful King Arthur's journey to being king, while its successor show, Tournament of Kings, is about an adult Arthur at the head of the Round Table.

=== King Arthur's Tournament ===
In King Arthur's Tournament, a young horseback-riding boy dismounts and sleeps in the country, wishing to become a knight. Merlin fulfills that wish, turning the boy into Jeffrey, the white knight. The arena is split into several sections, each corresponding to a location such as Kent, Saxony, Nottingham, and Aquitaine. The villainous black knight and a midget antagonize the white knight and his potential princess. Draped in a blue robe, Merlin encourages the audience to loudly boo the antagonists and support their knight. He demonstrates to them how to say "Huzzah" when cheering for their knight. The knights from each section joust to secure the privilege of proposing to the princess, and horseback riders who are speared fall off their horses. During the fighting, Merlin teases and excites the audience including ribbing a woman to "meet me after the show". Merlin acts as the narrator for the drama, attempts to rebuff the dwarf by lighting a fire under his backside, and throws thunderbolts. Women who evoke the Romani people dance. The black knight returns repeatedly for battle and is defeated. The white knight proposes to the princess, Guinevere, who accepts. The around 25 cast members host an extravagant wedding parade. Fireworks and lasers go off as the performers exit the stage.

=== Tournament of Kings ===
Clips from a 2022 show. Knights march into the fog-filled dirt arena. The dinner meal consists of a Cornish game hen, a bread roll, corn, and potatoes. Knights joust and fall off their horses. Pyrotechnics are used.

Each of the 10 sections is assigned to either a country's king or the black knight. Audience members root for the king or knight associated with their section. Kings are from eight countries including Austria, Norway, Russia, and Sweden. The wizard Merlin teaches participants the medieval way to root for their countries' representatives by raising their hands and shouting "Huzzah!". The cast is made up of 35 performers and 38 horses.

As the show starts, the music starts and the lights fade. Fog envelops the room and flash pots go off. Preceded by acrobats and drummers, King Arthur asks eight European countries' kings to join in a sporting contest to celebrate Prince Christopher, his son. Each king finds another king to joust or do hand-to-hand combat with. They compete in Capture the Flag. Adorned in lively silks that pair well with their riders, horses gallop around the arena. Behaving as cheerleaders, ladies-in-waiting and servants loudly encourage viewers to root for their king. After several rounds, a single king remains. Mordred, King Arthur's enemy, and the black knight turn up to participate in the fighting. Mordred, who is joined by his black dragon followers, kills King Arthur. When Mordred aims to murder Christopher, Arthur's son, the show uses a substantial amount of pyrotechnics. Strobe lights engulf the venue. Flames shoot from the black robe he wears at the kings he fights. The pyrotechnics are paired with lines from Mordred like "Fight the power of my dragon knight!" To defeat the forces of evil, the kings united. After every king is defeated, Prince Christopher fights Mordred on his own and wins. The show ends with a coronation of Christopher as king. After the show, several of the cast members, joined by their horses, meet with audience members for photos and question answering.

=== Twas the Knight ===
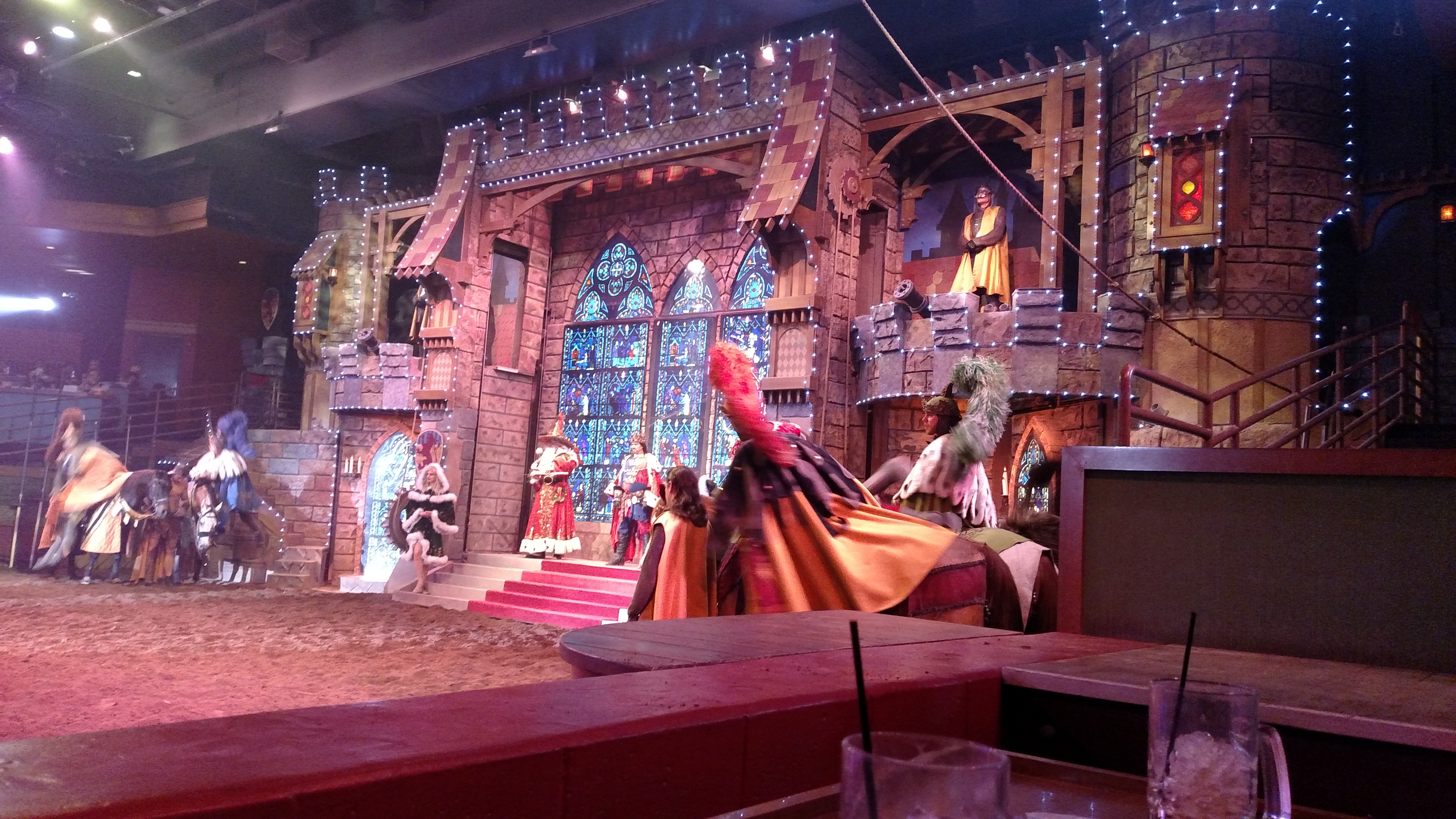
A performance of Tournament of Kings: Twas the Knight in 2018

Beginning in 2015, the company performed a holiday show named Tournament of Kings: Twas the Knight. The show is performed in November and December. In the story, Prince Christopher embarks on a quest to become a knight. Joined by knights and maidens, Merlin the Magician makes snow fill the arena which is reshaped into "a medieval winter wonderland". Santa Claus makes an appearance, and there is a ribbon dance. There are songs, poems, and music that fit the holiday theme. The menu includes a holiday-themed sugar cookie.

== Dinner show ==
Tournament of Kings is one of the few shows in Las Vegas to offer a dinner show. Both King Arthur's Tournament and Tournament of Kings, its renamed successor, served the same meal. Diners are not typically given cutlery or utensils and are expected to eat using their hands. They can get cutlery or utensils if they ask for some from their servers. Diners are given a sizable wet wipe to cleanse themselves. Beverages are served in pewter mugs, while food is served in bowls. The show's announcer told audience members, "Pound the tables only with the palms of your hands and not with the bowls.

Audience members receive a three-course meal. Audience members received Cornish game hen, broccoli, and the medieval wine mead in 1990. After the 1999 renovation, customers could sit on padded seats. There is significant space between the seats and the table on which the food is placed, making it is easier for customers to get food on themselves. During a 1999 dinner show, participants received a Cornish game hen, Pepsi, potato soup, a vegetable, and an apple tart. During a 2001 dinner show, the meal included broccoli and potatoes. Playing servants and wenches, waiters adorned in medieval clothes loudly support their teams. Rocky Mountain News's Lisa Bornstein said that the room is enveloped with dirt and dust as the horses gallop around the arena, so her "gruelish-looking chowder" tasted "even less appealing" after it got mixed with dirt. From 1990 to 2018, Excalibur bought and prepared over 6.7 million chickens for Tournament of Kings' dinner show; by 2018, Excalibur had been the U.S.'s biggest purchaser of Cornish game hens for several years.

== Audience ==
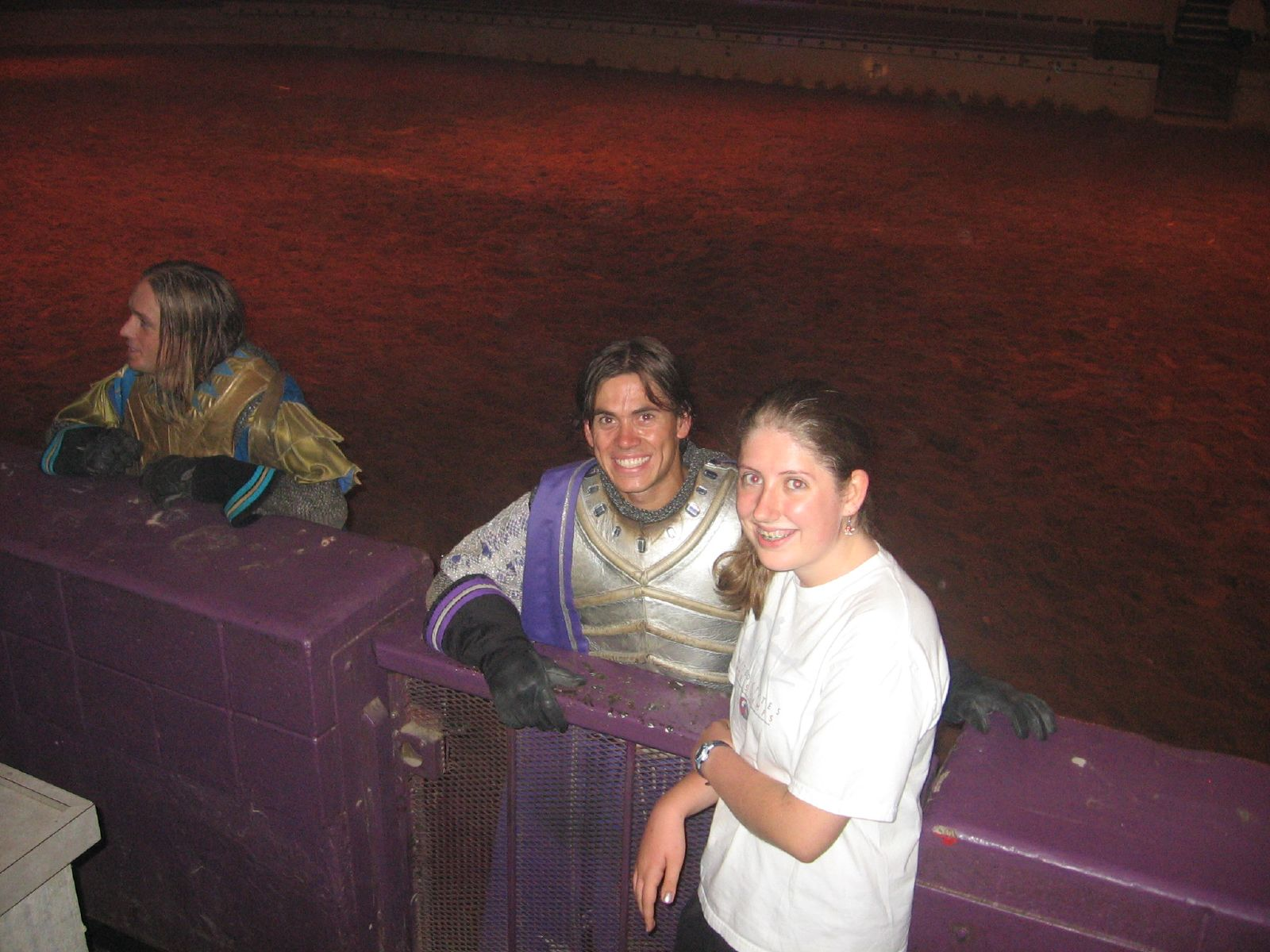
A king posing with an audience member in 2006

The show's founding producer Peter Jackson said of King Arthur's Tournament in 1999, "This will be totally different than anything else you can see in Las Vegas. The Excalibur is banking on a long-running alternative to the feather-and-sequin production shows." Pointing to Las Vegas' temporary transformation from an "Adult Disneyland" to a "family resort destination", Michael Paskevich of the Las Vegas Review-Journal called the show "the hall pass that launched a million pipsqueaks". 80% of the audience was adults in 2010.

Mike Weatherford of the Las Vegas Review-Journal found the show to be very macho, making it significantly different from other Las Vegas Strip shows, many of which he said featured pastel leotard-attired men prancing around while New Age music is played. He said the show best appeals to boys between the ages of 5 and 13 since it features knights clanking and clobbering each other. Weatherford said that boys and men between 14 and 50 would be the next group to like the show. He attributed this to their identical inclination to comedy and excitement at watching performances modeled after those at the World Wrestling Federation. Weatherford said that girls and women between the ages of eight and 25 would enjoy the show because the horseback-riding knights are very handsome and have long locks of hair like Fabio Lanzoni. He praised the show in 2006 for being "one of three or four with genuine family appeal on a Strip where stubborn families keep showing up" and in 2010 for being a summer 1990 relic of how Las Vegas potentially could be transformed into a family-friendly place.

Fodor's said "the show remains a great family gathering—especially for preadolescents, who get to make a lot of noise". The San Francisco Examiner's Jennifer Azevedo called it "one of the best shows on the strip for families", calling out the majestic horses and expert riders and noting that for kids, the choreographed fights would not be overly frightening. Las Vegas Review-Journal's Michael Paskevich said inspired by the good versus evil theme of professional wrestling, King Arthur's Tournament gave viewers the opportunity to holler.

== Music and choreography ==
Tim Cooper composed the songs in King Arthur's Tournament. The Las Vegas Review-Journal's Michael Paskevich said the "creative score evokes pomp and drama without a wit of cliche" and considerably strengthens the show. He concluded that Cooper's "intriguing score provides the required pomp to support a somewhat minimal plot". Joseph Blaum and John Abraham contributed to the music. The conversation is largely a preamble to the dancing and jousting. Paskevich found the riders to be extraordinary in being able to get back up after high-velocity falls from their horses. The performers do two iterations of the show every evening. To maintain variety, they periodically swap horses and characters. Equestrians alternate between two horses to allow the animals to have a rest day.

Tournament of Kings was scored by Scot Rammer. Michael Paskevich of the Las Vegas Review-Journal called it "a soaring new live score" that "fuses heavy symphonic drama and lighthearted madrigals at proper points". It has a substantial amount of choreography that is "of the staged, stunt-show variety". The men must be cautious so the clashes can appear somewhat routine. They persuasively smack their dueling partners' shields and create sparks when clanging their swords with sufficient force. Paskevich said the bouts are "metal-clanging loud and as convincing as a pro wrestling bout". During the performance, the horseback-riding knights fall off their animals, go on races, engage in sword combat, and travel in a "parade formation" throughout the venue. While jousting, the knights use "break-away lances". For knights, the physically toughest part of the show is falling off the horse in response to a competitor's lance "spearing" them. Two knights' injuries from performances included a rib fracture, a bulging disc on the back, and a separated shoulder. Mike Weatherford of the Las Vegas Review-Journal said that the show's producers realize the audiences anticipate seeing battles like those from movies, so they do their utmost to give audiences what they want. He opined, "Still, after the Lord of the Rings movies, you can't help wishing for a little more story and a little less pre- and post-conflict pageantry".

== Reception ==
The Las Vegas Review-Journal's Michael Paskevich penned a positive review of King Arthur's Tournament in 1997, calling it "sometimes silly but always enjoyable" and praised the "well-choreographed and mostly exciting battle scenes". The Press-Enterprise's David Rush and Darrel Santschi said when they saw King Arthur's Tournament in 1990, "the Medieval Times clone paled in comparison to its Buena Park cousin". The critic Charles Marowitz lauded the show, writing, "Medieval England notwithstanding, this is a joyous affirmation of the American way of life—the subjugation of all adversaries—the triumph of Might that makes all Right. It is Desert-Storm Bush getting a standing ovation from both houses of Congress, John Wayne zapping the gooks, Joe McCarthy routing the Reds. It is blueberry pie, the Elks and the Kiwanis, the Daughters of the American Revolution, and William Buckley telling it like it is."

In a 1999 Daily Herald review, Havalah Gholdston praised the show, writing, "It's huge, it's cheesy, it glitters, the music is really loud and there are live horses. And the food is pretty good, too." She was most impressed by the horses and kings, saying that the performers demonstrated their brawn and dexterity in riding the horses. Rocky Mountain News's Lisa Bornstein gave the show a C− in 2000, stating, "The equestrian tricks are fun to watch, and a few of the effects are impressive, but Tournament of Kings is a lot to pay for some very mediocre entertainment and a lot of forced cheering." Catherine Beeghly of the Chico Enterprise-Record enjoyed the show in a 2011 review, calling it "a joyfully boisterous experience with clumps of mud flying around".

Rating the show a B in 2001, Mike Weatherford of the Las Vegas Review-Journal praised the show, writing, "Dirt, beer, whoopin', hollerin', table-pounding and sparking metal ... the welcome opposite of most shows on the Strip". Weatherford again lauded the show in 2010, stating, "there's something undeniably compelling for children of all ages in the intricate, visceral stunt work by convincing buff guys. The jousting and swordplay — backed by Scot Rammer's timelessly cinematic score — rise above surrounding pageantry that was showing its age in a recent 20th-anniversary performance".
