= WWE Niagara Falls =

Retail store in Niagara Falls, Ontario, Canada

Coordinates: 43.09129°N 79.074193°W

- Industry: Retail
- Founded: July 2002
- Defunct: March 2011
- Headquarters: Canada
- Products: Clothing, toys, accessories and media
- Owner: Canadian Niagara Hotels Inc.

WWE Niagara Falls was a retail store located in Niagara Falls, Ontario, Canada. It was owned and operated by Canadian Niagara Hotels Inc., with its name and branding being licensed from the WWE.

It was the second WWE establishment to open up after WWF New York/The World in 1999, and the first WWE establishment to open outside of the United States. After The World closed in 2003, it became the only official WWE retail store in the world.

== History ==
The venue was announced during the WrestleMania X8 fan access press conference in early 2002. The facility opened in July 2002 as part of the Clifton Hill strip in Niagara Falls. It was owned by Canadian Niagara Hotels Inc. who own the Falls Entertainment Avenue Resort. The venue was mainly a gift shop with WWE memorabilia and exhibitions on display, selling everything from action figures and t-shirts to books, DVDs, autographs and exclusive WWE Niagara Falls branded merchandise. The store featured a drop tower attraction called The Pile Driver, based on the wrestling move, spanning 220 feet (67 m). This particular attraction was open from mid-May to mid-November due to seasonal demand and climate reasons.

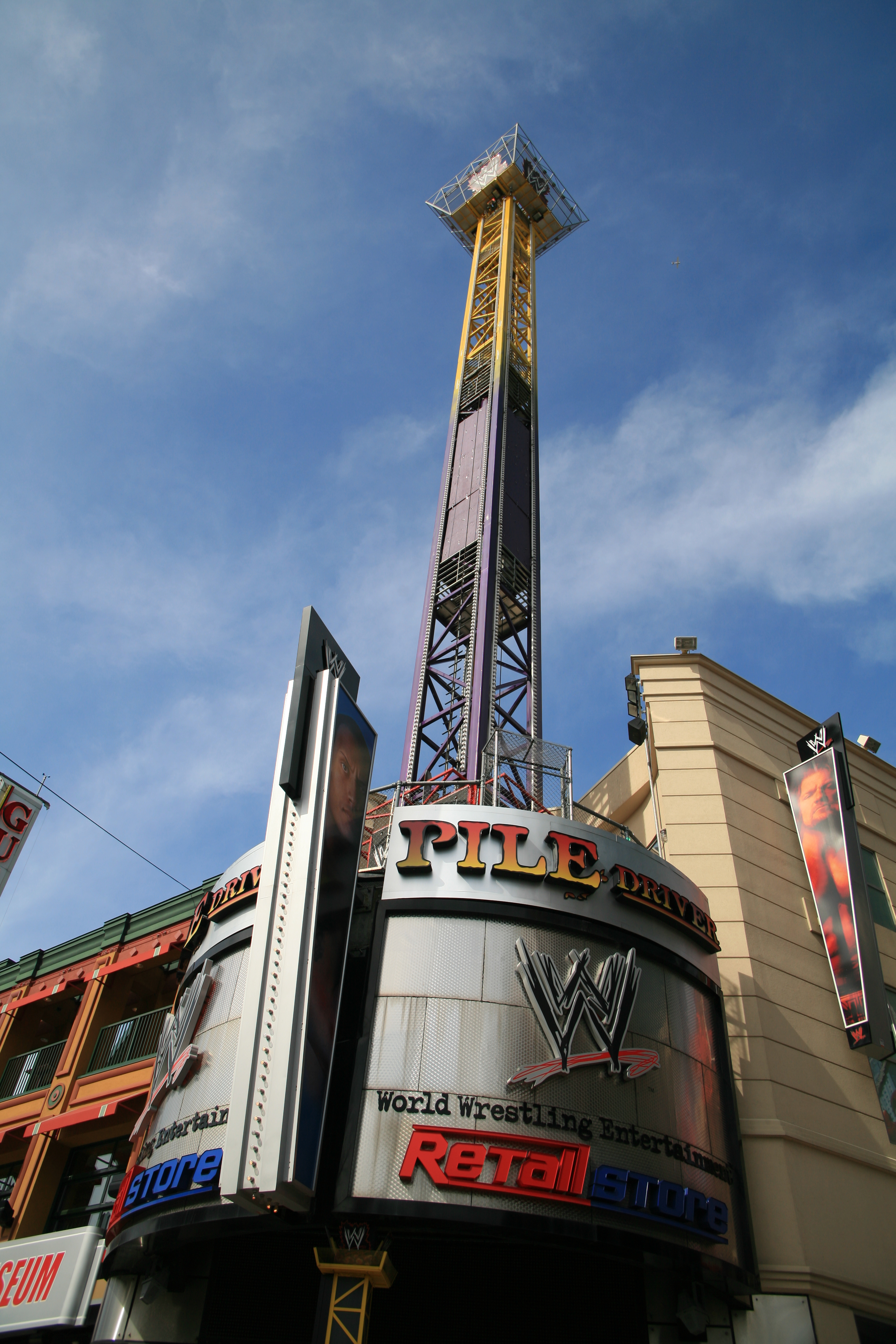
WWE Niagara Falls and Pile Driver drop tower

The venue also featured video games and pay-per-views playing to entertain the visitors, as well as many WWE entrance themes and event music, mostly audio produced by Jim Johnston. During the first couple of years of operation, a sixty-minute video feed ran throughout the store, and this was available at all Canadian Niagara Hotels Inc.'s owned hotels branded as a WWE channel - used to promote the store to tourists. The upstairs section of the store featured a free indoor light show in its initial years of operation.

For its opening, Trish Stratus, Chris Benoit, and Val Venis arrived to sign autographs for fans and to officially open the store. Stratus' signing at the store can be seen on her 2003 DVD, Trish Stratus: 100% Stratusfaction Guaranteed. Many wrestlers visited the store thereafter, those being John Cena, Batista, Rey Mysterio, Randy Orton, Edge, Rob Van Dam, Mr Kennedy, Booker T, Torrie Wilson, Roddy Piper, Lita, Maven, Gene Okerlund, Stacy Keibler and Bobby Heenan. The store also hosted a special Jim Ross barbecue event. The last signing the store held was Gail Kim and Evan Bourne in October 2009.

== Legacy ==
WWE Niagara Falls ceased operations as of March 31, 2011. The store was re-opened in late 2011 as a generalized Niagara Falls gift store, though selling some miscellaneous wrestling items such as action figures and clothing. In 2015, the gift store was closed and the site became home to Niagara Brewing Company. The building was subsequently gutted and re-modelled. Most notably, the piledriver ride on the roof was replaced with an outside terrace for diners.

In March 2017, the piledriver ride was transported to the Magic Land Theme Park in Amman, Jordan, where it remains.

WWE would later open the WWE Experience theme park in Riyadh on February 16, 2024.

== See also ==
- WWF New York (later known as The World)
- Clarion Hotel and Casino (attempted to transform into WWF venue)
