= Excalibur Hotel and Casino =

Hotel and casino in Paradise, Nevada

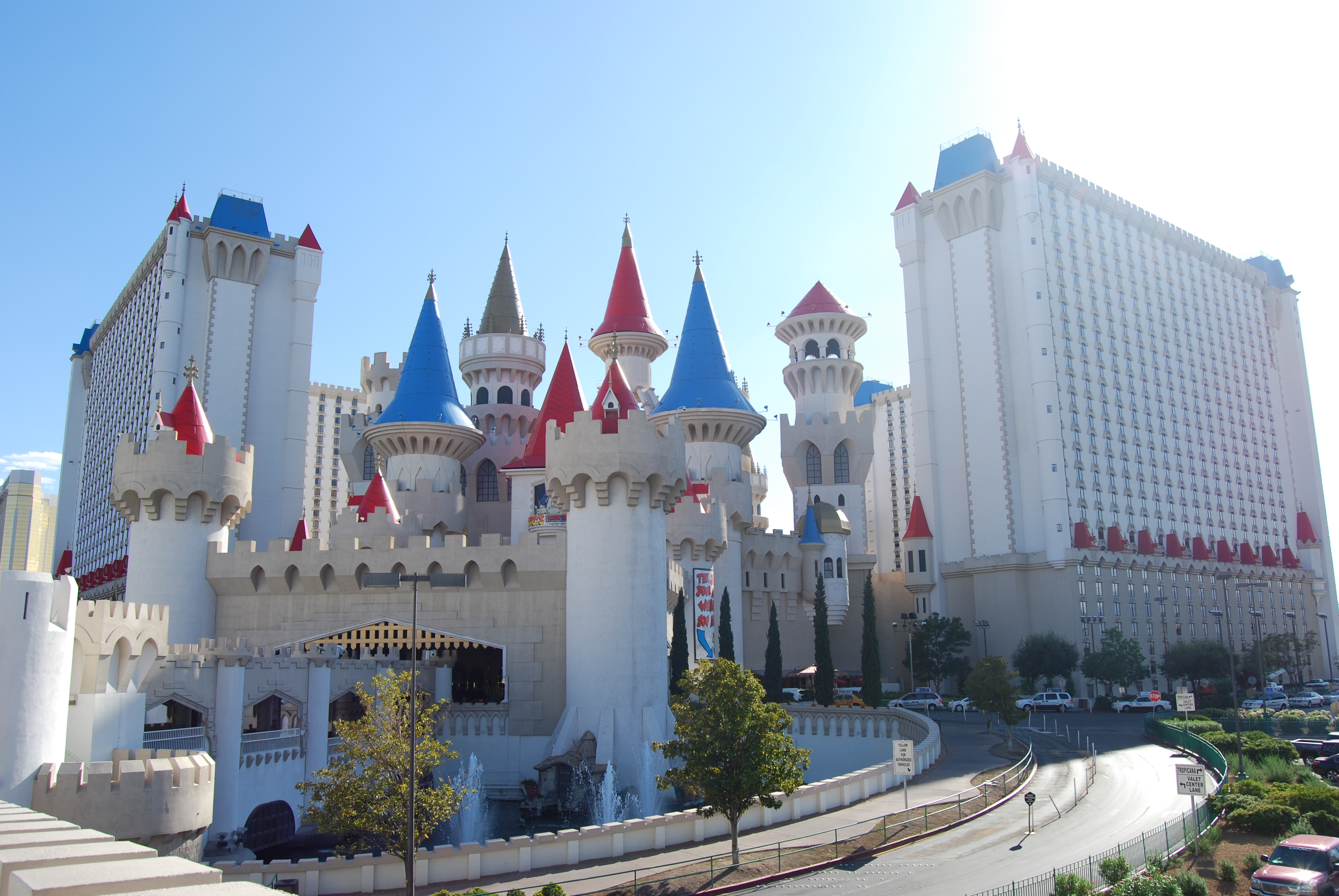

- Location within Las Vegas Strip Location within Nevada
- Interactive map of Excalibur Hotel and Casino
- Location: Paradise, Nevada, U.S.; 3850 South Las Vegas Boulevard; 36°05′56″N 115°10′32″W
- Opened: June 19, 1990; 36 years ago
- Theme: Medieval Europe
- No. of rooms: 3,981
- Gaming space: 92,389 sq ft (8,583.2 m^{2})
- Permanent shows: Tournament of Kings; Australia's Thunder from Down Under; The Australian Bee Gees
- Notable restaurants: The Steakhouse at Camelot; Dick's Last Resort
- Casino type: Land-based
- Owner: Vici Properties
- Operating license holder: MGM Resorts International
- Architect: Veldon Simpson
- Renovated in: 2006, 2014
- Website: excalibur.com

Excalibur Hotel and Casino is a casino hotel on the Las Vegas Strip in Paradise, Nevada, United States. It is owned by Vici Properties and operated by MGM Resorts International. The resort features a medieval castle theme and is named after King Arthur's mythical Excalibur sword. The property features include a 92,389 sq ft (8,583.2 m^{2}) casino, a 28-story hotel with 3,981 rooms, and various restaurants.

The $290 million property was developed by Circus Circus Enterprises. The castle theme was conceived by company founder William Bennett, and the resort was designed by Veldon Simpson. Bennett and the design team traveled to castles throughout Europe for inspiration. Construction began in October 1988, and the resort opened on June 19, 1990. It was the largest hotel in the world until the opening of the nearby MGM Grand in 1993.

Excalibur has hosted numerous shows, including Thunder from Down Under, which opened in 2002 and is the longest-running male revue in Las Vegas. Tournament of Kings, a medieval-themed show featuring sword fights and jousting, is the longest-running dinner show on the Strip.

== History ==
Excalibur occupies approximately 50 acres (20 ha), located along the Las Vegas Strip at the southwest corner of the Tropicana – Las Vegas Boulevard intersection. The property was once the proposed site of the Xanadu, a 1,730-room resort announced in 1975. The Xanadu was never built, as its developers could not secure a deal with the county on the sewer infrastructure such a large project would have required.

Circus Circus Enterprises purchased the vacant site in May 1988, and announced plans a month later to build a castle-themed resort on the land. The company held an international contest to determine the name of the new resort. More than 180,000 entries were made, and the winning name, "Excalibur", was selected from more than 33,000 names. It is named after King Arthur's mythical Excalibur sword.

Groundbreaking for Excalibur took place on October 7, 1988. Marnell Corrao Associates served as the general contractor. The $290 million resort opened on June 19, 1990, receiving 30,000 visitors on its first day. Excalibur was among new entertainment-oriented megaresorts to open on the Strip, continuing a trend started by the Mirage in 1989.

On March 21, 2003, Josh Ford of Los Angeles hit the largest Megabucks Jackpot to date of US$39.7 million at Excalibur.

Circus Circus Enterprises became Mandalay Resort Group in 1999, and ownership of Excalibur was passed to MGM Mirage in 2005, after it acquired the company. The resort's new owner was subsequently renamed MGM Resorts International in 2010. Ownership of Excalibur, along with many other MGM properties, was transferred to MGM Growth Properties in 2016. Vici Properties acquired MGM Growth and its properties in 2022, while MGM Resorts continues to operate them under a lease agreement.

== Design ==
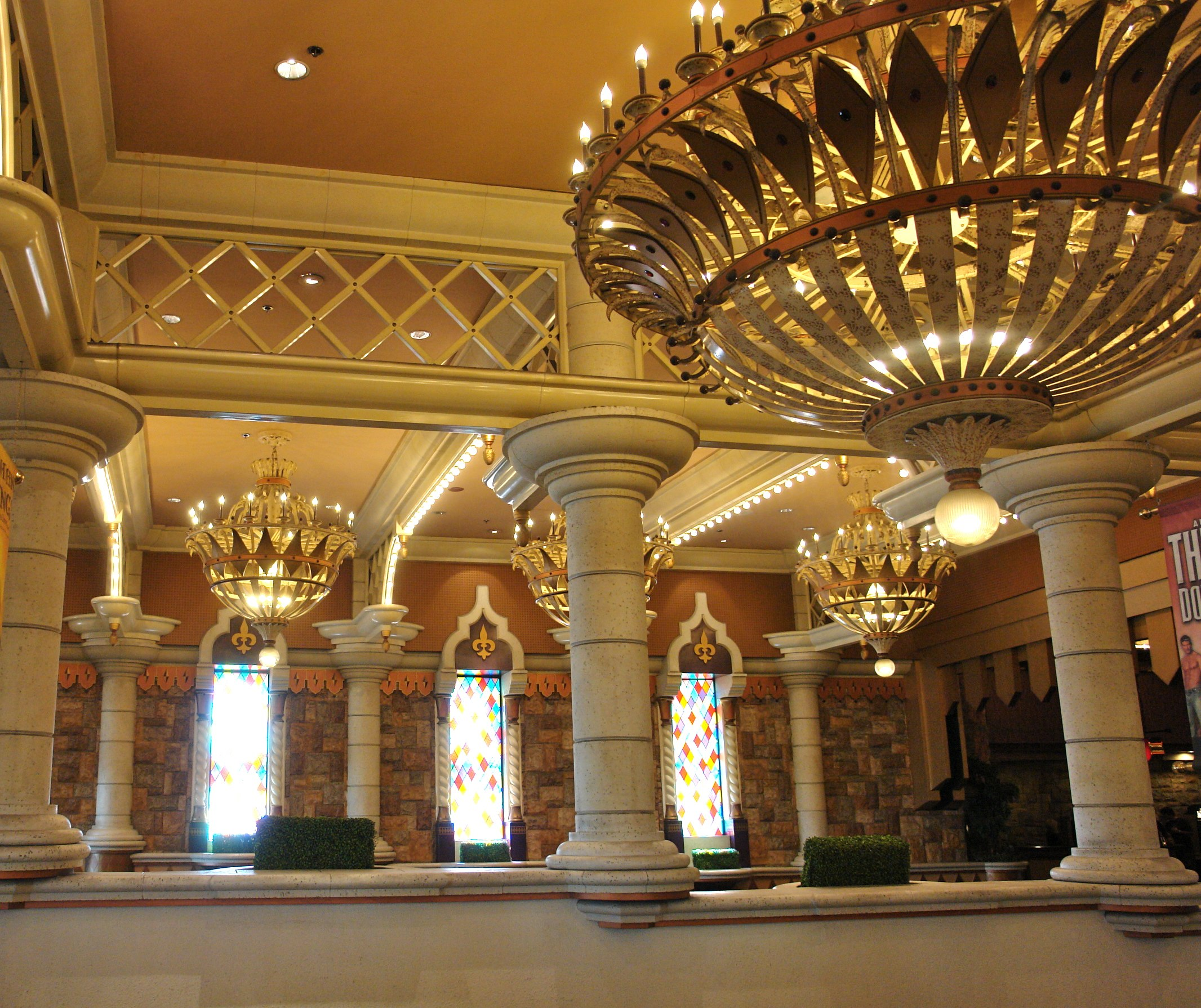
Decorative interior work

The medieval castle theme was conceived by Circus Circus founder William Bennett, and the resort was designed by Veldon Simpson. Bennett studied old castle renderings, and he and Simpson visited castle sites in England and Germany for design inspiration. Simpson's Excalibur design was inspired particularly by Neuschwanstein Castle in Germany. Trademark experts were hired to avoid replicating the castle designs at Disneyland and Disney World. Excalibur's medieval architecture includes stone turrets, and a moat and drawbridge.

Yates-Silverman handled the interior design. The firm conducted library research into castles and also visited such buildings in Europe, in addition to film studios. According to Michael Erickson, design director at Yates-Silverman: "We were basically looking for the same level of design that you would find in film. If you designed rooms as they literally looked during the traditional period, they would be dark, dingy and dirty. You have to romanticize it a little bit and take more of a theatrical approach."

== Features ==
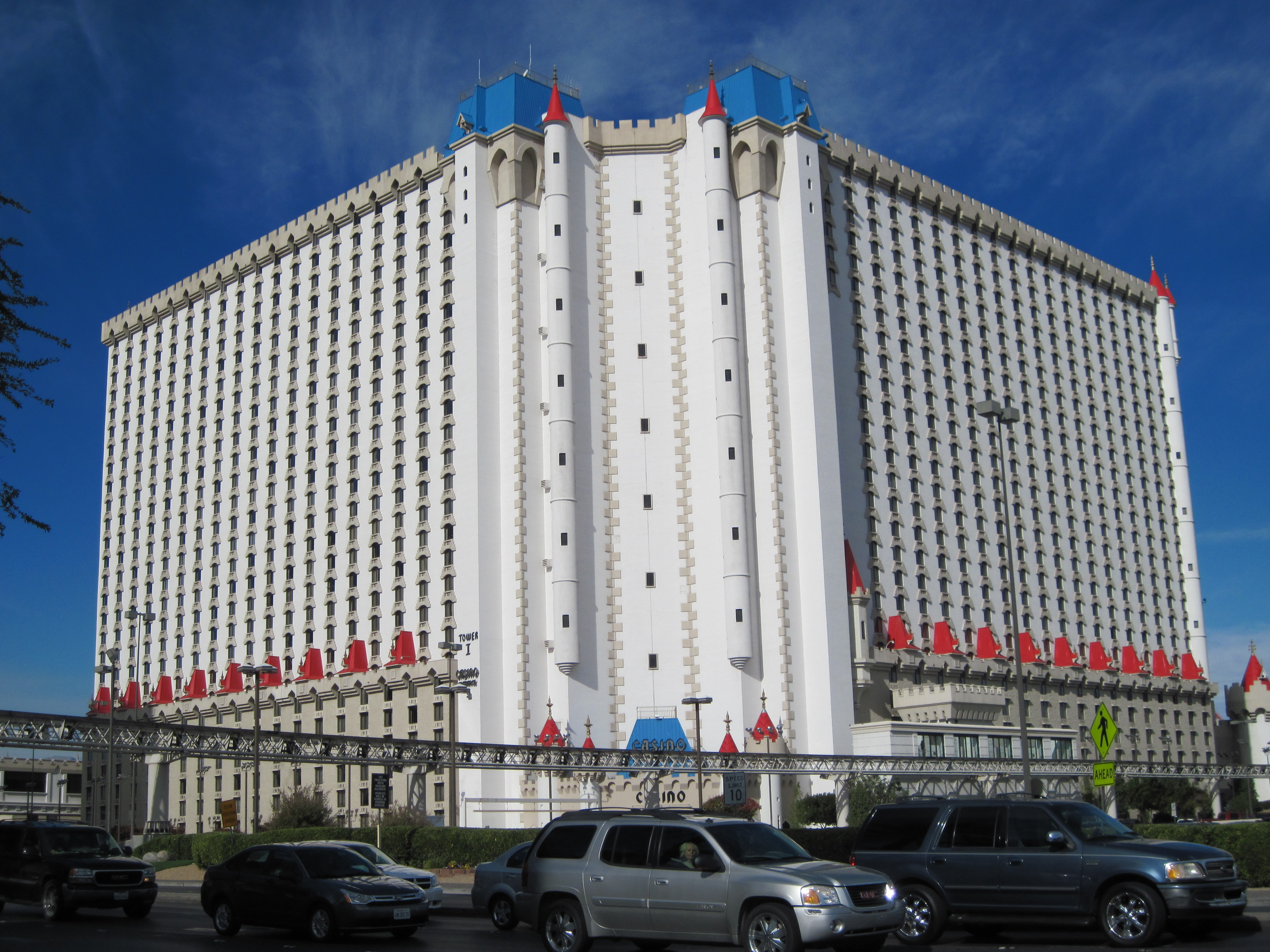
Exterior of the hotel

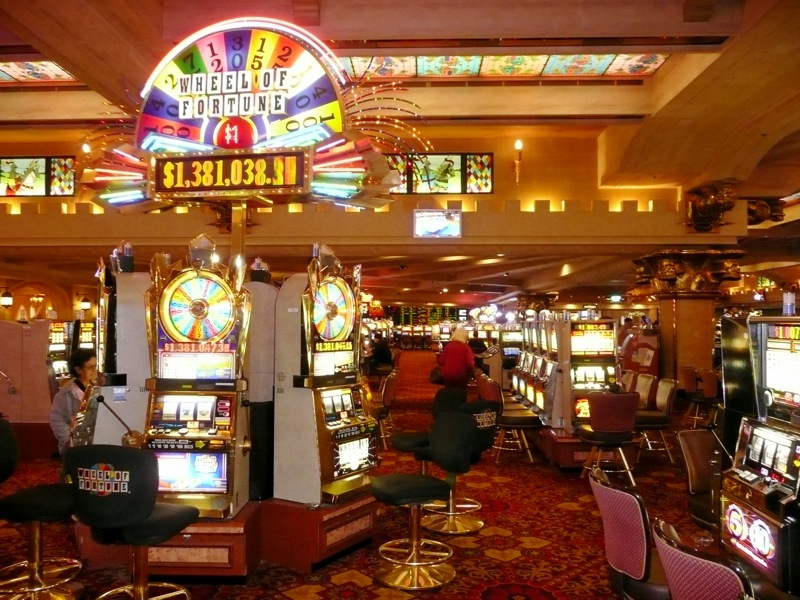
Casino floor in 2008

The Excalibur hotel has 3,981 rooms, spread across four 28-story towers built out in a square footprint. The resort originally opened with 4,032 rooms, making it the largest hotel in the world. This record was surpassed by the 1993 opening of the MGM Grand, located diagonally across from Excalibur. A hotel remodeling project began in 2006, and was scheduled to conclude four years later. In accordance with guest feedback, the multi-phase project removed castle-themed elements from the rooms in favor of an understated design.

Excalibur's casino measures 92,389 sq ft (8,583.2 m^{2}). It opened with 2,630 slot machines, and more than 100 table games. In 2008, Excalibur removed its live poker dealers and replaced them with automated tables manufactured by Pokertek, through a deal that lasted 10 months. The new tables appealed primarily to a lower-paying clientele and beginners, prompting the resort to bring back live poker, which was preferred by experienced players and those willing to spend more.

Upon its opening, Bennett described Excalibur as an upgrade from the Circus Circus resort in Las Vegas, while still targeting the same family demographic. Family-friendly attractions included an arcade, an indoor medieval-themed midway, and motion simulator rides taking place in two theaters, each seating 48 people.

South of Excalibur are two other MGM properties, Luxor and Mandalay Bay. The three resorts are connected via the Mandalay Bay Tram. Of the three, Excalibur is considered the low-budget property.

=== Restaurants ===
Excalibur included 17 restaurants upon opening. In 1997, the resort added the Steakhouse at Camelot, which would go on to become a Zagat award winner. At that time, it also included the second-largest buffet in Las Vegas, seating more than 1,300. In 1998, Excalibur announced a partnership with World Championship Wrestling to open a wrestling-themed restaurant at the resort. The $2 million WCW Nitro Grill opened in May 1999, and operated for 16 months, featuring regular appearances from professional wrestlers during that time.

In 2007, Dick's Last Resort opened an 11,000 sq ft (1,000 m^{2}) location at Excalibur. The band Lynyrd Skynyrd would also license its name to a new restaurant at the resort. Lynyrd Skynyrd BBQ & Beer opened in December 2011, along with American Burger Works, both managed by the same company. The two restaurants operated for nine months, eventually closing due to financial problems.

Buca di Beppo opened at Excalibur in 2011. A year later, the resort debuted its Castle Walk food court, which introduced several eateries not already on the Strip. At 20,000 sq ft (1,900 m^{2}), it was among the largest food courts on the Strip. Because Excalibur had an exclusive deal with Pepsi, the food court housed one of the few McDonald's in the world to vend the soft drink rather than its competitor, Coca-Cola. The McDonald's eventually closed in 2016.

Johnny Rockets opened in 2014, taking the space formerly occupied by American Burger Works. Later that year, the resort completed a $6 million renovation of its buffet, which seats 610. Fatburger opened its first Strip location in 2022, at Excalibur.

== Live entertainment ==
=== Medieval shows ===
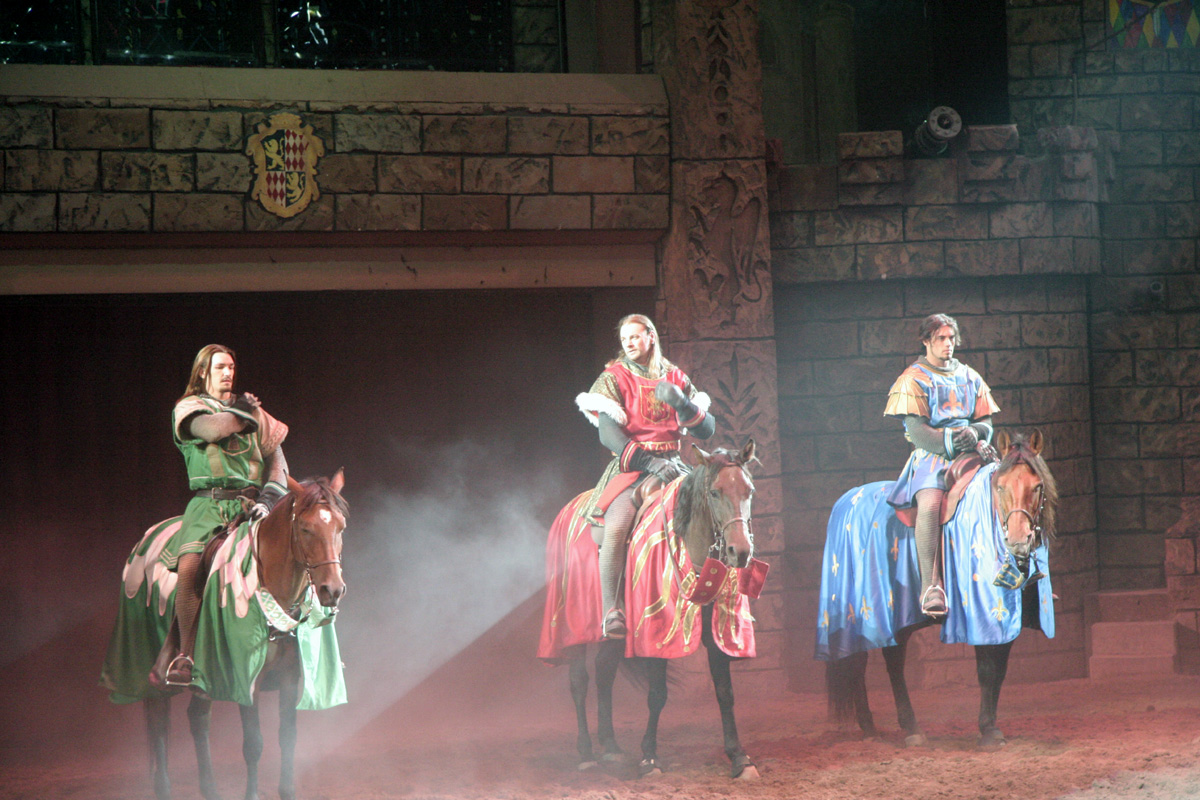
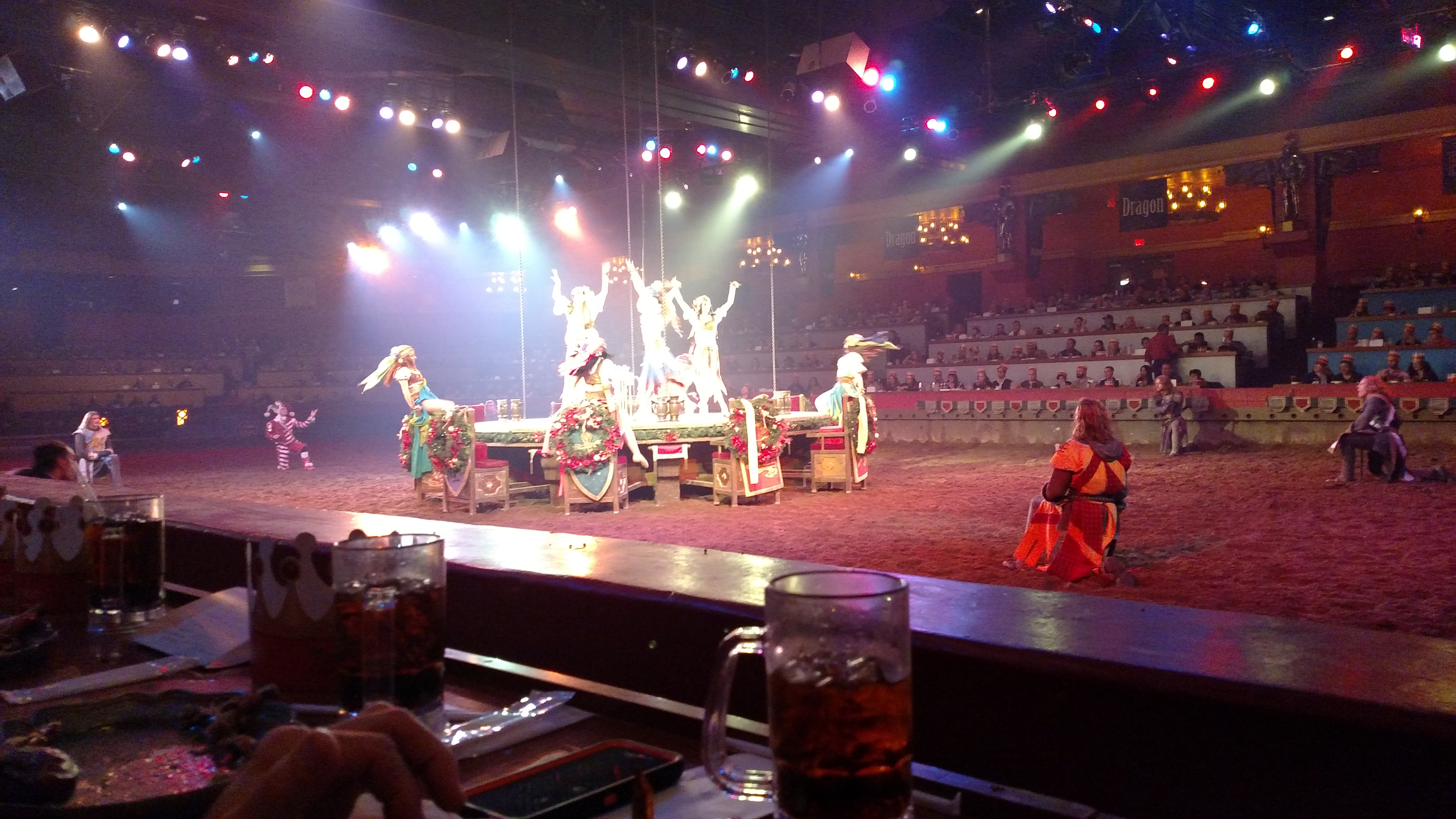
Tournament of Kings

Excalibur has featured two medieval-themed shows since its opening, both taking place in a 900-seat dinner theater. Jousting has been a signature aspect of both shows. Performances take place in a dirt arena, and meals are served medieval-style, without utensils.

The original show, King Arthur's Tournament, included 45 actors and 15 horses upon its opening. The show closed in January 1999, after approximately 5,600 performances. It was replaced a month later by a revamped version known as Tournament of Kings. More than $2 million was spent to update the show and remodel the arena. Both shows were created by the French-born producer Peter Jackson, who died shortly before Tournament of Kings was launched. His son, Patrick Jackson, took over as producer.

Tournament of Kings incorporates pyrotechnics and various stunt work, including sword fights. As of 2008, the cast included up to 38 humans and 11 horses. The show had a total of 30 horses, kept in an air-conditioned facility behind the resort. As of 2010, it was the only show in Las Vegas to feature horses. King Arthur's Tournament had featured female horse riders, although it would not be until 2014 that Tournament of Kings introduced its first female rider.

Tournament of Kings is popular among families. It is the Strip's longest-running dinner show, and also one of its longest-running shows in general. Excalibur is the world's top buyer of Cornish game hens, having served 6.7 million of them through the show from its original opening in 1990 through 2018.

=== Dragon show ===
In 1993, the resort debuted a three-story animatronic dragon, part of a show in which it faced off against a mechanical statue of Merlin. The show took place at the moat entrance, and was performed hourly each night. The fire-breathing dragon was created by Alvaro Villa's company, AVG Inc, and took nine months to build. A six-story dragon had previously been considered. The dragon and Merlin effects were generally considered underwhelming. In 2002 and 2003, readers of the Las Vegas Review-Journal named the show as the city's worst attraction. The show ended around 2003, although for nearly 20 years the dragon remained intact, hidden beneath the drawbridge.. After tourists began looking for the dragon and uploading their videos online, a wall was built and the tracks were disassembled for good.

=== Other shows ===
Thunder from Down Under opened at the resort in July 2002, and is the longest-running male revue in Las Vegas. Since 2011, the Thunder from Down Under venue has also been host to The Australian Bee Gees Show, a tribute to the original Bee Gees musical group. The venue originally seated 375 people. It was renovated in 2019 and named the Thunderland Showroom, with seating expanded to 425. Magician Hans Klok began performing in the space later that year, sharing it with Thunder from Down Under and the Bee Gees show. Amid the COVID-19 pandemic, Klok departed the property in 2020, as he felt that pandemic-related restrictions would hinder revenue. Magician Mac King took his place in 2021, starring in a comedy magic show.

Other shows at the resort have included the Royal Lipizzaner Stallions, a group of Lipizzaner horses which performed various maneuvers for spectators during the 1990s. Catch a Rising Star, a chain of comedy clubs, opened a location at Excalibur in 2001, operating there for nearly three years. The club was added in response to guest feedback. Louie Anderson also performed comedy acts in the resort's showroom, starting in 2006. He entertained there until 2010.

Fuerza Bruta, a show featuring acrobats, opened in March 2019. It was performed in a 3,800 sq ft (350 m^{2}) on-site tent, with a standing-only capacity of 950 people. The show was signed for a six-month run, but ended a month after its debut, due to poor ticket sales; each performance had an average of only 50 guests.

== In popular culture ==
In 2003 and 2004, Excalibur was used as a filming location for the television program Fear Factor. The 2004 video game Grand Theft Auto: San Andreas features fictional resorts based on those located along the Strip, including a castle-themed property called the Come-A-Lot modeled after Excalibur.

== Gallery ==
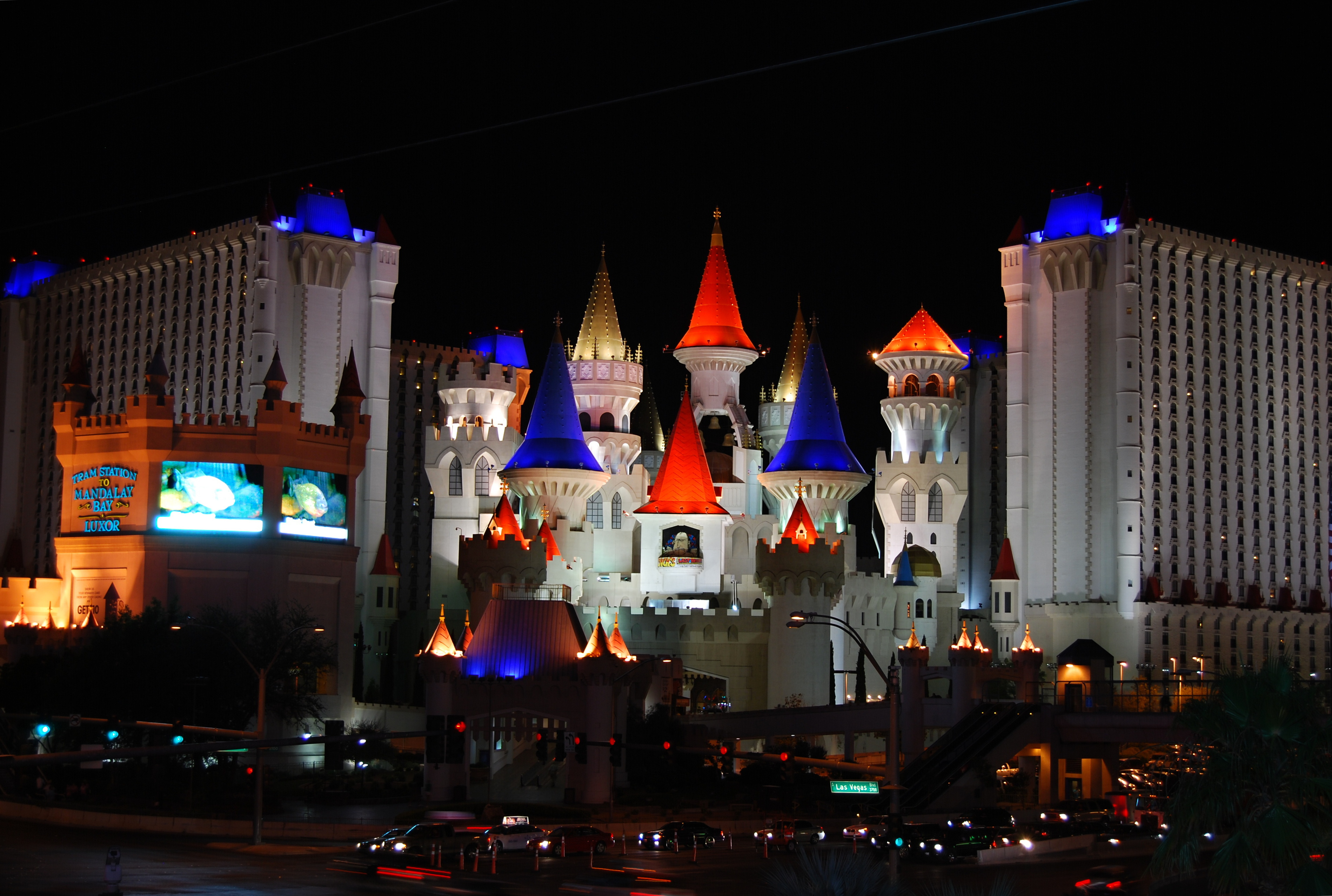
Excalibur's main entrance

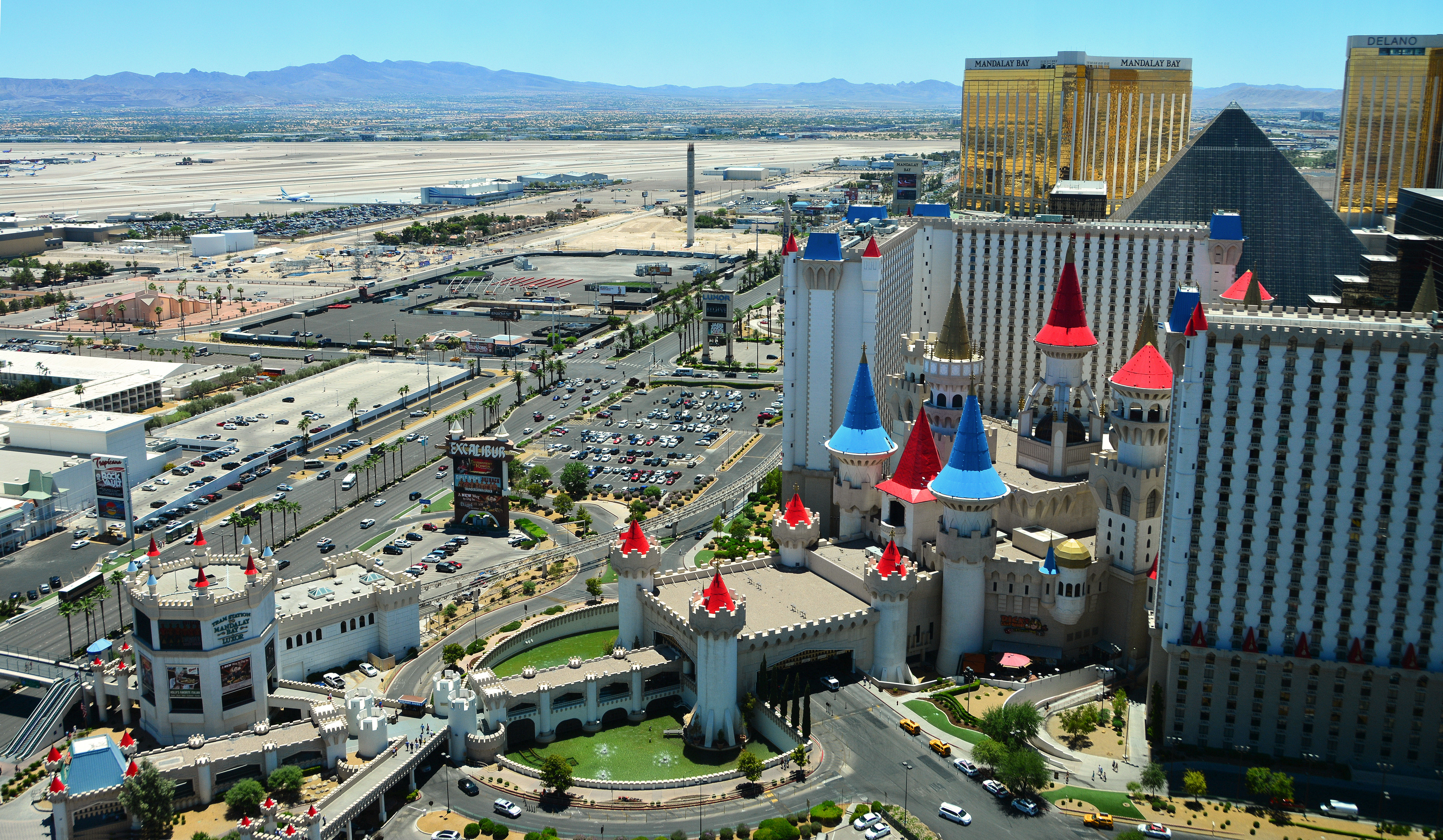
Overlooking the main entrance from New York-New York

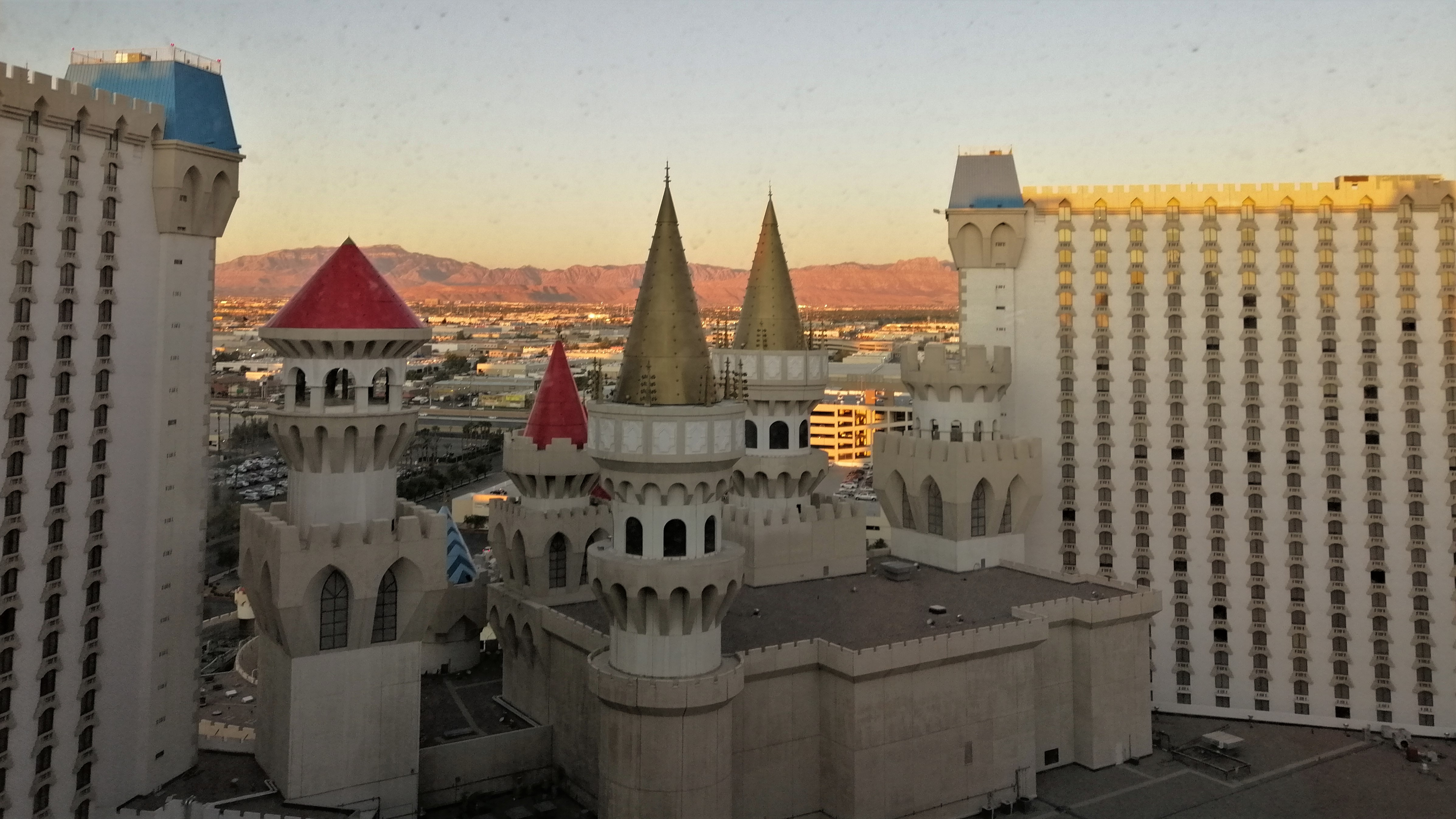
View from a hotel room, looking southwest

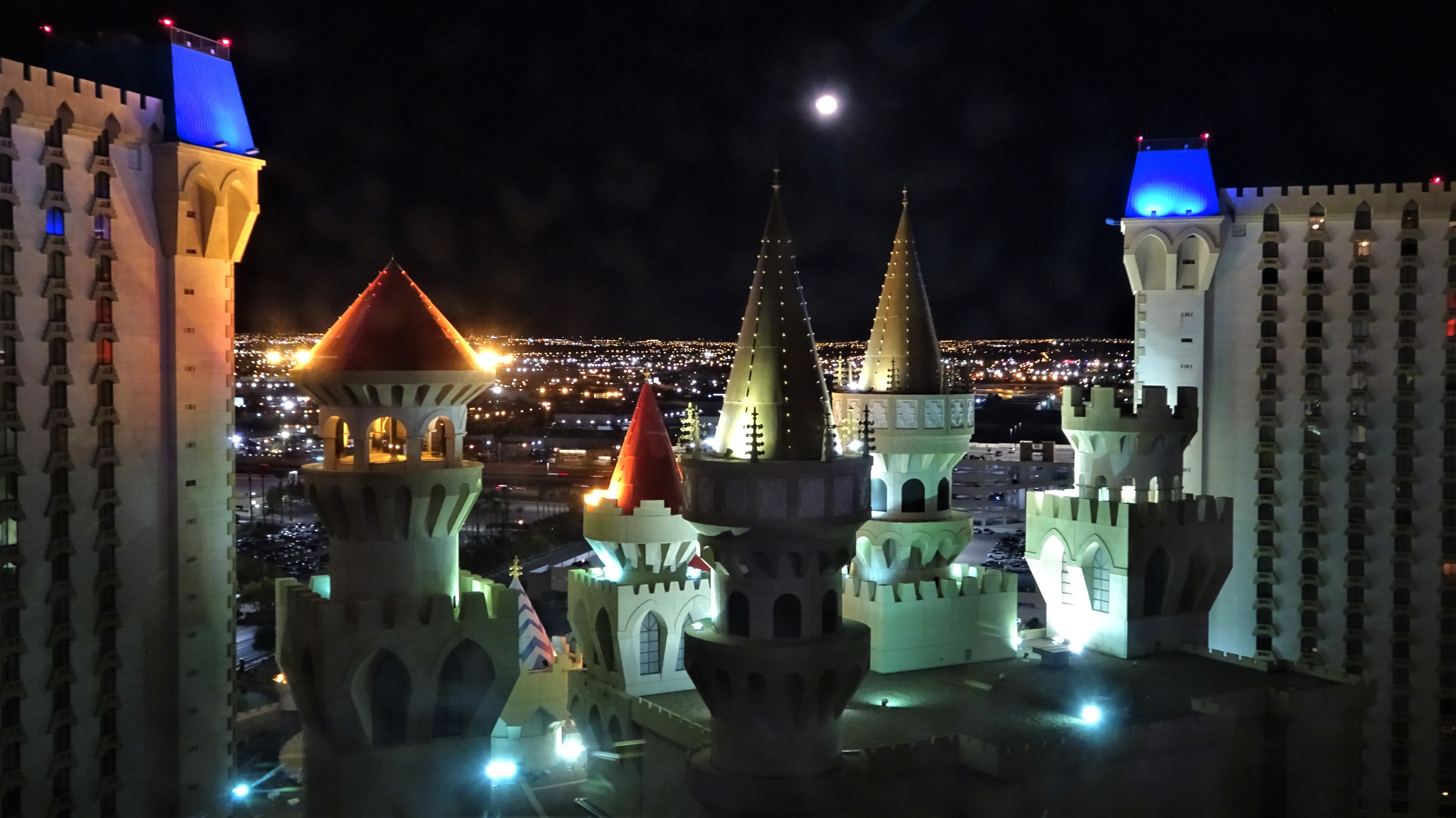
Same view at night

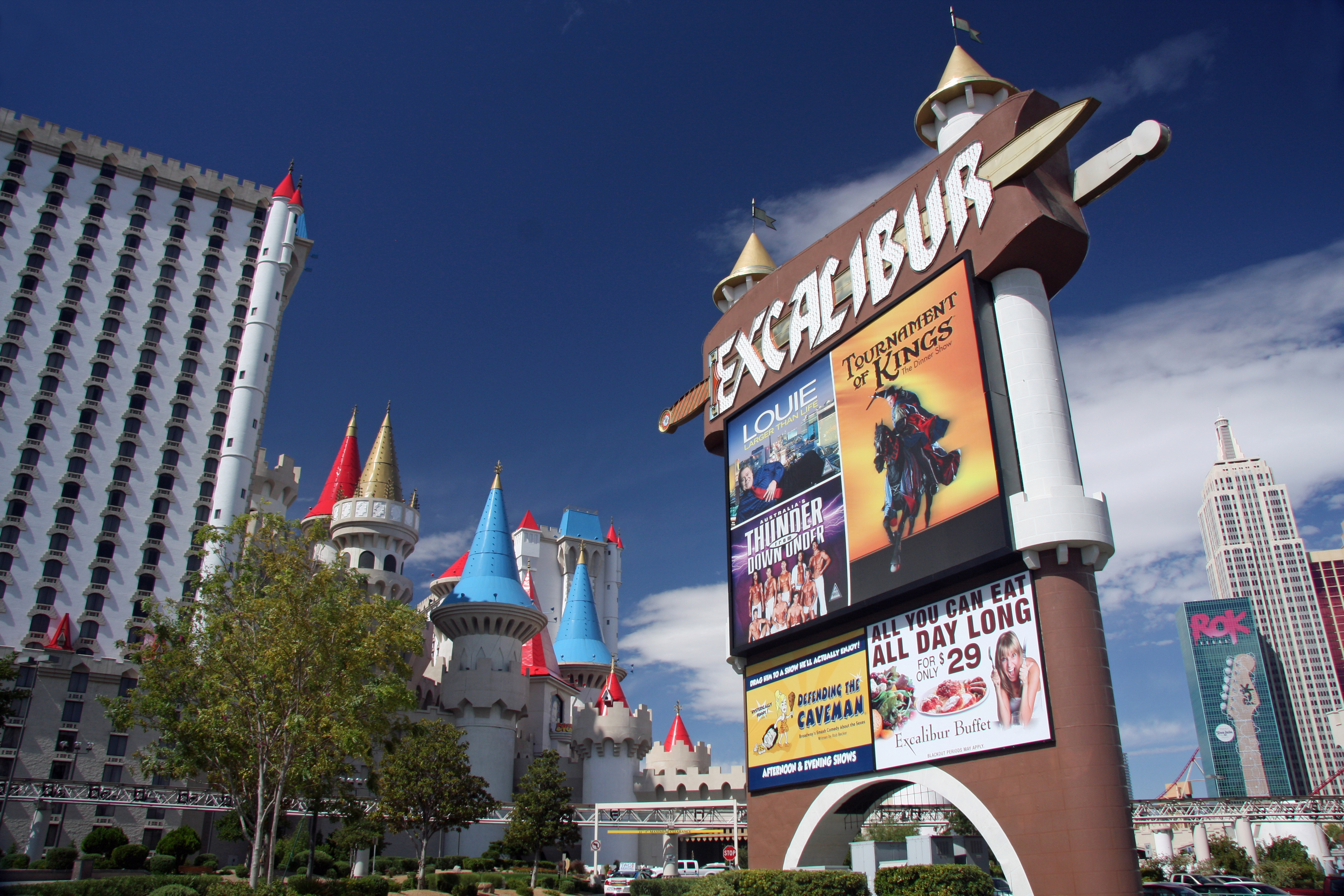
Roadside sign along the Strip

== See also ==
- List of integrated resorts
- List of largest hotels
