= WWF New York =

Themed restaurant in New York City

Coordinates: 40.75659°N 73.98626°W

WWF New York Inc. The World Entertainment, LLC.
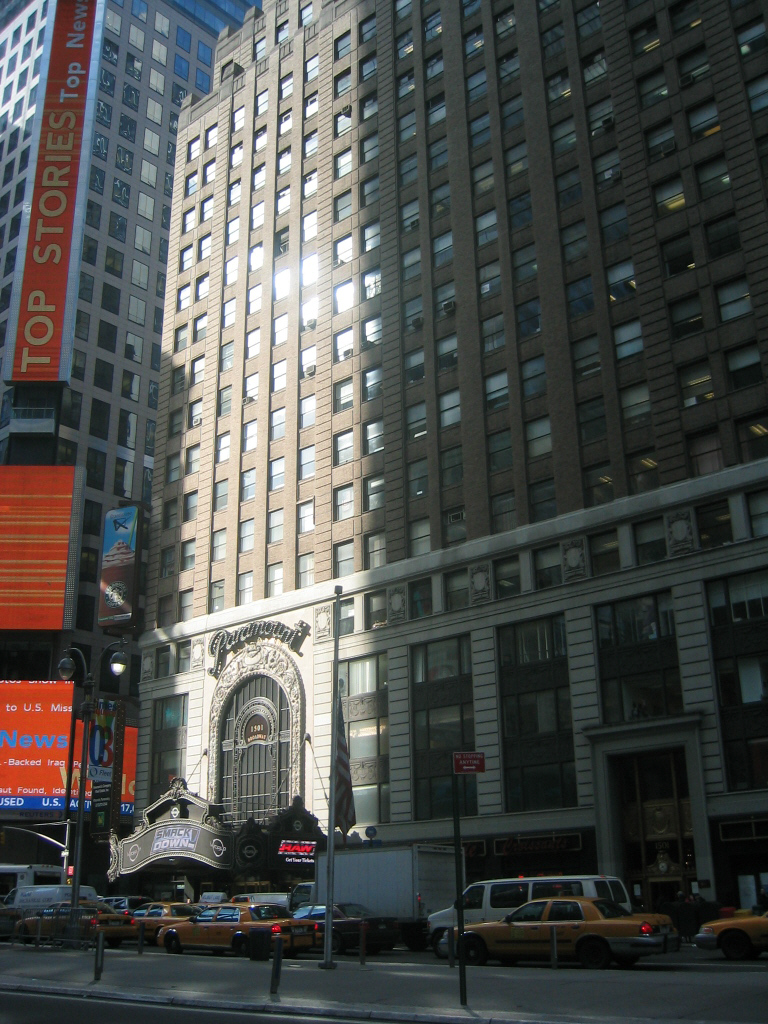
- Industry: Entertainment restaurant
- Founded: November 1999
- Defunct: February 2003 (nightclub and restaurant); April 2003 (retail store)
- Headquarters: Paramount Theatre building 1501 Broadway Manhattan, New York City, New York, U.S.
- Key people: Vince McMahon (chairman), Linda McMahon (CEO)
- Owner: World Wrestling Federation / Entertainment

WWF New York (later known as The World) was a World Wrestling Federation / Entertainment (WWF/E) themed restaurant, nightclub and retail store in Times Square in New York City, leased in the Paramount Theatre building.

The venue was best known for featuring in segments on Raw and SmackDown, and having live segments of Heat emanate from its complex that was hosted by Michael Cole and Tazz from October 2000 to February 2002. The venue would also host special events such as Raw's 10th Anniversary and various autograph signings and appearances from WWF/E performers.

== History ==
=== WWF New York ===
In November 1999, WWF chairman Vince McMahon leased space at the Paramount Theatre in Times Square in Manhattan. The complex consisted of a retail store with merchandise on the first floor and a nightclub, restaurant and arcade underground. The venue featured various pieces of WWF memorabilia on display with superstar entrance music playing throughout the store, mainly music composed by Jim Johnston. Wrestling fans from around the Metropolitan New York City area, as well as from around the world, went to the complex as they would show pay-per-views, Raw, SmackDown, and other events on monitors all around the nightclub, including showing them on a big screen. A fee was charged for admission to the events. The restaurant exclusively showed pay-per-views live from the United Kingdom at no charge.

The venue hosted two musical performances by the Misfits in 2001. Later in April 2002, Prince performed a spontaneous 'after party' at the club following a concert mere hours earlier. The after show featured special guests Alicia Keys, Questlove, George Clinton, Larry Graham, and Doug E. Fresh performing together.

The interior venue and exterior sidewalk appeared in the WWF/E game series as a wrestling location. The games included WWF SmackDown! 2: Know Your Role, WWF SmackDown! Just Bring It, WWE SmackDown! Shut Your Mouth and WWE SmackDown! Here Comes the Pain.

=== The World ===
In May 2002, the World Wrestling Federation (WWF) was renamed to World Wrestling Entertainment (WWE) due to a trademark dispute over the 'WWF' initials with the World Wildlife Fund. Instead of renaming the venue from WWF New York to WWE New York, the decision was made to rename the venue as The World in an attempt to attract a wider audience. The venue would still operate the gift store selling WWE merchandise, and the nightclub would continue to host special WWE events and superstar appearances.

In July 2002, the venue inspired the opening of a sister-venue, WWE Niagara Falls, which featured a gift store and drop tower theme ride. Unlike The World, the Niagara Falls location was owned by Canadian Niagara Hotels Inc. with a licensing agreement from the WWE.

=== Closure ===
In February 2003, Linda McMahon, the CEO at the time, elected to close the restaurant and nightclub sections so WWE could concentrate more on their global efforts. The retail shop closed two months later.

== Legacy ==
The complex remained closed for two years until 2005, when the Hard Rock Cafe took over the lease and the business. On August 16, 2006, WWE returned to the location for the 2006 Diva Search finale. WWE also held press conferences at the Hard Rock Cafe for WrestleMania 24, 25, 27 and 30.

== See also ==
- WWE Niagara Falls
- Clarion Hotel and Casino (attempted to transform into WWF venue)
