= Dream Las Vegas =

Hotel and casino project

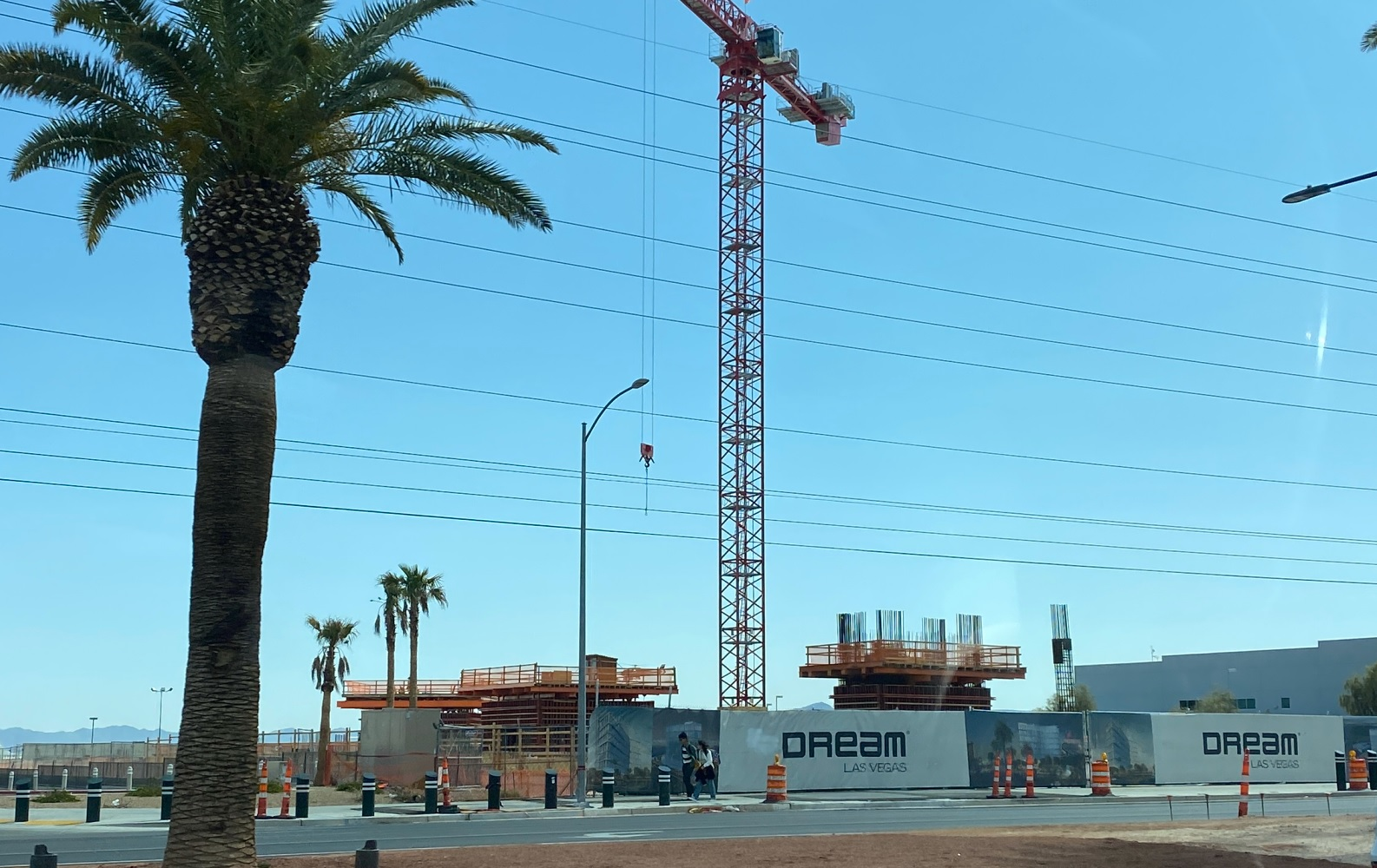
- Dream construction site in April 2023
- Interactive map of Dream Las Vegas
- Location: Paradise, Nevada; 5051 South Las Vegas Boulevard; 36.084205°N 115.171541°W
- No. of rooms: 531
- Gaming space: 20,000 sq ft (1,900 m^{2})
- Casino type: Land-based
- Owner: McCarthy Building Companies
- Architect: DLR Group

Dream Las Vegas is a partially-completed boutique hotel and casino project on the southern Las Vegas Strip in Paradise, Nevada. It was being developed by Shopoff Realty Investments and the real estate firm Contour.

Dream Las Vegas was announced in February 2020, and construction was expected to begin within a year. However, the project was delayed after the Transportation Security Administration raised numerous safety concerns, regarding its proximity with Harry Reid International Airport. The project underwent numerous design changes and received county approval in October 2021. The 20-story hotel was expected to cost $550 million, would include 531 rooms and be managed by Dream Hotel Group, serving as the company's flagship location. Construction began on July 8, 2022, but was paused in March 2023, due to stalled funding. The project's general contractor, McCarthy Building Companies, acquired the property in August 2025, as the result of a settlement following unpaid work.

== History ==
=== Background ===
The 5.25-acre (2.12 ha) site was once intended to house the northern portion of the Paramount resort, which was being planned in 2005. The project was eventually canceled, and the vacant site later came to the attention of developer David Daneshforooz, who owns the southern California real estate firm Contour. Daneshforooz partnered with Shopoff Realty Investments to purchase the site for $21 million. The sale was finalized in February 2020, and the partners soon announced plans to build Dream Las Vegas, a boutique hotel and casino.

The hotel portion will be managed by the New York-based Dream Hotel Group, which had been interested in entering the Las Vegas market for more than 10 years. The company had previously considered renovating an existing Las Vegas property under the Dream brand, before partnering with Contour and Shopoff in late 2019. The casino will be managed by Peninsula Pacific Entertainment. The $300 million project would include 450 rooms, and would not compete against nearby megaresorts. The project was designed by DLR Group.

The property is located on the east side of the southern Las Vegas Strip, in an area that had seen little development in recent years, due to the Great Recession. Daneshforooz felt confident that the new Allegiant Stadium, located about a mile away, would help make Dream Las Vegas a success. The resort would also be next to the new Pinball Hall of Fame, and near the Welcome to Fabulous Las Vegas sign, a popular tourist attraction.

The site is also adjacent to Harry Reid International Airport, located to the east. Buildings in the immediate vicinity are generally limited to 100 feet (30 m) in height, so Dream's developers applied for a height waiver from the Clark County Commission. The Federal Aviation Administration had already determined that the 237 foot (72 m) high hotel tower would not interfere with airport operations, stating that the project could go as high as 244 feet (74 m). Nevertheless, several airlines and pilot associations opposed the height for a number of reasons.

=== Delays and redesign ===
Construction was initially expected to begin by early 2021, with completion occurring two years later. However, the COVID-19 pandemic reached the state a few weeks after the project's announcement, and its construction lender temporarily paused financing as a result, pushing back the intended start of construction by several months.

Before construction began, Dream Las Vegas was further delayed when the Transportation Security Administration (TSA) raised safety concerns regarding its location, stating that the project presented numerous security risks because of its proximity to the airport. For example, incoming airplanes would be vulnerable to vantage points at the hotel that would inadvertently allow for long-range gun attacks and laser flashing. It was also feared that the property's service road could be infiltrated by improvised vehicular bombs. The TSA sent the Dream project plans to the Federal Bureau of Investigation, the Department of Homeland Security, and the U.S. Secret Service for further evaluation.

Numerous design changes were made during 2021 to resolve the security concerns. This included moving the porte-cochère and resituating the hotel tower closer to the Strip, away from the airport property line. A security wall, 9 feet (2.7 m) in height, will also separate the two properties, and the service road will only be accessible through a security checkpoint. Other changes include a totally enclosed parking garage, and the removal of a ninth-floor pool club. All hotel-room balconies were scrapped, and a system will be installed to inform resort security of hotel-window tampering; gunman Stephen Paddock had broken the windows at his Mandalay Bay hotel room to commit the 2017 Las Vegas shooting.

The county commission approved the redesigned project in October 2021, with a height of 20 stories at 234 feet (71 m). Construction began on July 8, 2022, with completion expected in late 2024. It is under development by Shopoff and Contour, with McCarthy Building Companies as general contractor. The $550 million project will include 531 rooms, a 20,000 sq ft (1,900 m^{2}) casino, restaurants, nightlife entertainment, a third-floor pool deck, and meeting and event space. The resort will serve as the flagship location for Dream Hotel Group. The resort is expected to employ approximately 800 people.

Construction was paused in March 2023, due to stalled financing. The project was 19-percent complete, including basement excavation, underground utilities, and concrete pilings. As construction was paused, McCarthy filed a lien against the property for more than $40 million in unpaid work. Several subcontractors also filed liens. In October 2024, the developers requested a two-year extension of building permits, stating that they hoped to secure a new construction loan. In August 2025, McCarthy paid off the other lien holders and acquired ownership of the site through a settlement. McCarthy had no plans for the property at that time, and Shopoff was seeking funds to eventually buy back the project and complete it.
