= Veldon Simpson =

American architect

Veldon Simpson is an architect. He designed the Luxor Hotel in Las Vegas, Nevada, as well as the MGM Grand and Excalibur Hotel and Casino. He is the president of the Veldon Simpson-Architect, Inc., which formed as a corporation in 1976.

== See Also ==
- List of American architects
