= Blvd (Las Vegas) =

Shopping center on the Las Vegas Strip

- Location: Paradise, Nevada, U.S.
- Coordinates: 36.106104°N 115.172338°W
- Address: 3755 South Las Vegas Boulevard
- Opened: November 15, 2024; 23 months ago
- Owner: Gindi Capital; Cherng Family Trust
- Floor area: 400,000 sq ft (37,000 m^{2})
- Floors: 3
- Website: blvdlasvegas.com

Blvd (stylized as BLVD) is a three-story shopping center on the Las Vegas Strip in Paradise, Nevada, United States. It was developed by Gindi Capital, in partnership with entrepreneurs Andrew and Peggy Cherng. The project was announced in 2019, but delayed due to the COVID-19 pandemic in Nevada. Construction began in 2023, and the first tenant, Puma, opened on November 15, 2024. Construction was finished by June 2025, with several additional tenants opened and others set to debut in 2026.

== History ==
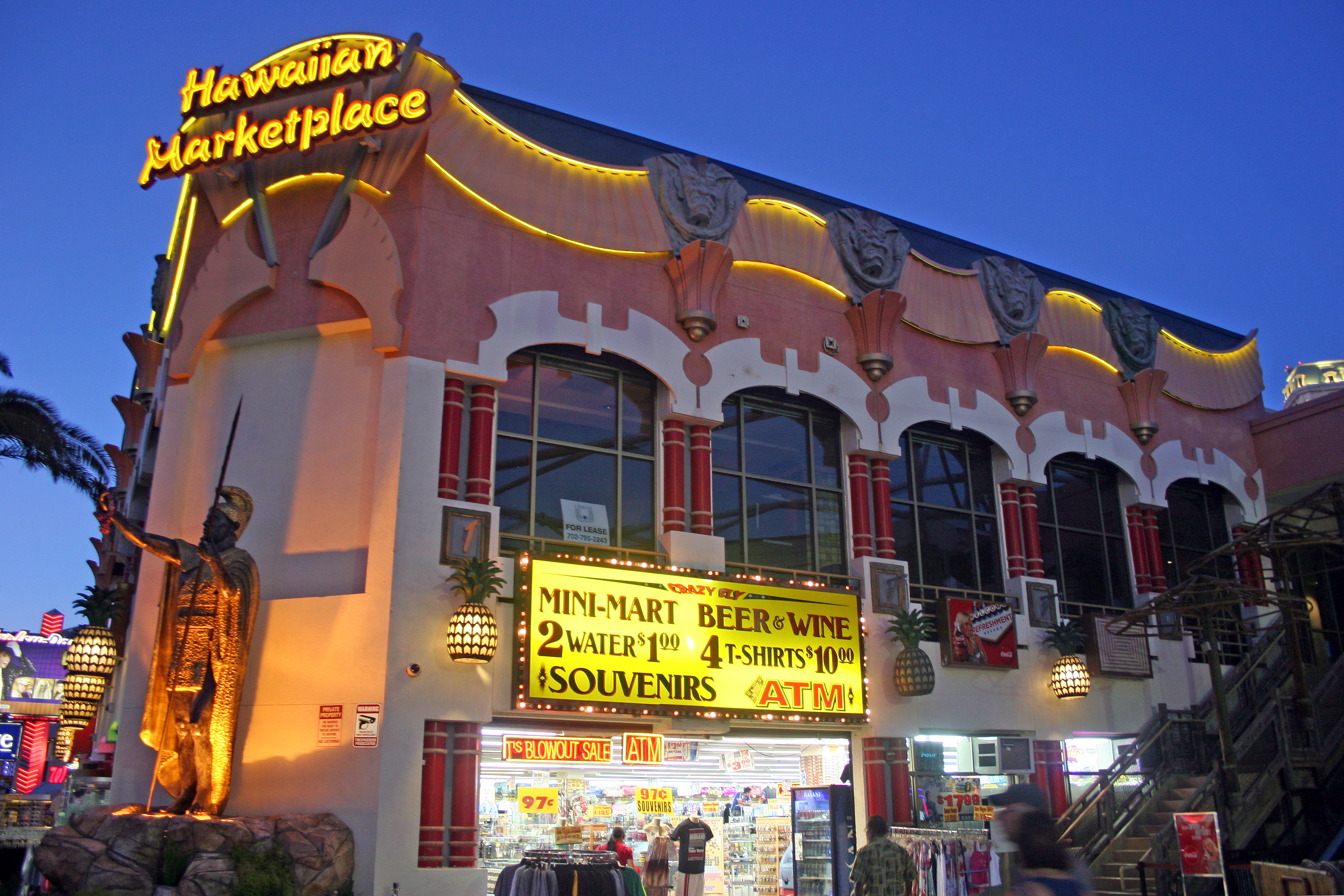
Hawaiian Marketplace in 2012

Blvd is being developed by New York-based Gindi Capital, which also owns the Showcase Mall, located further south on the Las Vegas Strip. The Blvd site was previously occupied by the Hawaiian Marketplace, opened in 2004. Other structures on the property included a strip mall known as Cable Center Shops, and the Boulevard food court. The site was once planned to feature an Elvis Presley-themed resort, a project that was canceled due to the Great Recession.

Gindi purchased the structures, as well as rear acreage, in 2019. The parcels, totaling 9.5 acres (3.8 ha), were sold for $172 million. Gindi soon announced plans to build a retail and entertainment complex on the site, although the project was delayed as a result of the COVID-19 pandemic. It was further hampered after the pandemic caused a rise in interest rates. To offset the project's costs, Gindi partnered with entrepreneurs Andrew and Peggy Cherng, who co-own the Waldorf Astoria hotel across the street. Cherng Family Trust is a 50-percent partner in Blvd.

The existing structures on the site closed in mid-2022, and were demolished early the following year. Construction soon began on Blvd, with The PENTA Building Group as the general contractor. The project was topped out in December 2023, and was 20-percent leased at that time.

The first tenant, Puma, opened on November 15, 2024, ahead of the Las Vegas Grand Prix, an annual race held by Puma's partner Formula One. Construction on the overall Blvd structure was completed by June 2025, and several additional tenants had opened by then; others remained in the works, with some set to open in 2026.

== Features ==
Blvd will have a total of 400,000 sq ft (37,000 m^{2}) across three floors, including a 110,000 sq ft (10,000 m^{2}) rooftop dining terrace, overlooking the Strip and serving as a venue for events.

The first two floors are dedicated to retail space, with 700 feet of street frontage along the Strip. Tenants will have two-story storefronts. Unlike the nearby Shops at Crystals, Blvd will not feature high-end retailers, instead focusing on a middle-class clientele. In addition to Puma, other notable tenants will include Adidas, H&M, Abercrombie & Fitch, and an In-N-Out Burger, one of the largest in the chain. In addition, Blvd will feature around a dozen restaurants. Netflix House, an entertainment concept by Netflix, Inc., is scheduled to open in 2027 and will feature attractions based on various Netflix programs.

Blvd was designed by BWA Architects, 5+design, and 3 Egg Studio. The rear of the property was left vacant for future development, including a possible hotel.
