= Panda Inn =

Restaurant chain

- Genre: Sit-down Chinese restaurants
- Founded: Pasadena, California (June 8, 1973; 53 years ago)
- Founder: Andrew Cherng; Ming-Tsai Cherng
- Headquarters: Rosemead, California
- Number of locations: 4
- Area served: Southern California
- Key people: Andrew Cherng, Founder and Chairman of the Board; Peggy Cherng, Co-Chairman of the Board; Tom Davin, Chief Executive Officer
- Owner: Panda Restaurant Group
- Parent: Panda Restaurant Group
- Website: www.pandainn.com

Panda Inn is a chain of sit-down Chinese restaurants in California owned and operated by the Panda Restaurant Group.

The company's original founding goal was to bring new varieties of Chinese cuisine, such as Mandarin cuisine and Sichuan cuisine dishes, to Southern California, which had traditionally favored Chinese Cantonese cuisine.

== History ==
The first Panda Inn was founded by Andrew and Peggy Cherng and Andrew's father, Master Chef Ming-Tsai Cherng, all of whom used to live in the Yangzhou region of China's Jiangsu province. Their first location was opened on June 8, 1973, in Pasadena, California. A short time after Ming-Tsai died, a second location was opened in 1982 in nearby Glendale.

A few months after the opening of the Glendale location of the Panda Inn in 1982, the Cherngs were invited by the developer of the Glendale Galleria to open a quick serve version of the Panda Inn inside the mall. This new concept was called the Panda Express and it opened inside the Galleria in October 1983.

The first Panda Inn in Orange County, the sixth in the chain, opened in La Palma in 1990. A Panda Inn in San Diego opened at Horton Plaza in 1985 but closed in January 2017.

Andrew Cherng and his wife Peggy Tsiang Cherng are alumni of Baker University in Baldwin City, Kansas.

== See also ==
- List of Chinese restaurants
