= Comtal =

Digital image processing company

Comtal Corporation
- Type: Private
- Industry: Electronics
- Founded: c. 1973; 53 years ago in Pasadena, California
- Founder: John Tahl, Stanley Baker
- Products: Digital image processors
- Parent: 3M

Comtal Corporation was an American electronics company that was one of the first to specialize in digital image processing. It was founded in 1973 by John Tahl and Stanley Baker in Arcadia, California and was acquired by 3M in 1980. Users of Comtal image processors included NASA, the military, computer-aided designers, X-ray technicians, and engineers in the field of signal processing.

== History ==
Comtal Corporation was founded in 1973 by John Tahl and Stanley Baker in Arcadia, California. The foundation for the company's first products was based on research conducted on digital image processing by NASA in the 1960s at the Stennis Space Center (then known as the Mississippi Test Facility). This research yielded the Spectravision system, a digital image display manufactured by Aerojet in the late 1960s. Team members on the Spectragraph project founded Comtal in 1971 or 1972. Although a small operation, the company aggressively marketed its digital image displays through the mid-1970s, by which point Aerojet's Spectragraph system was extinct.

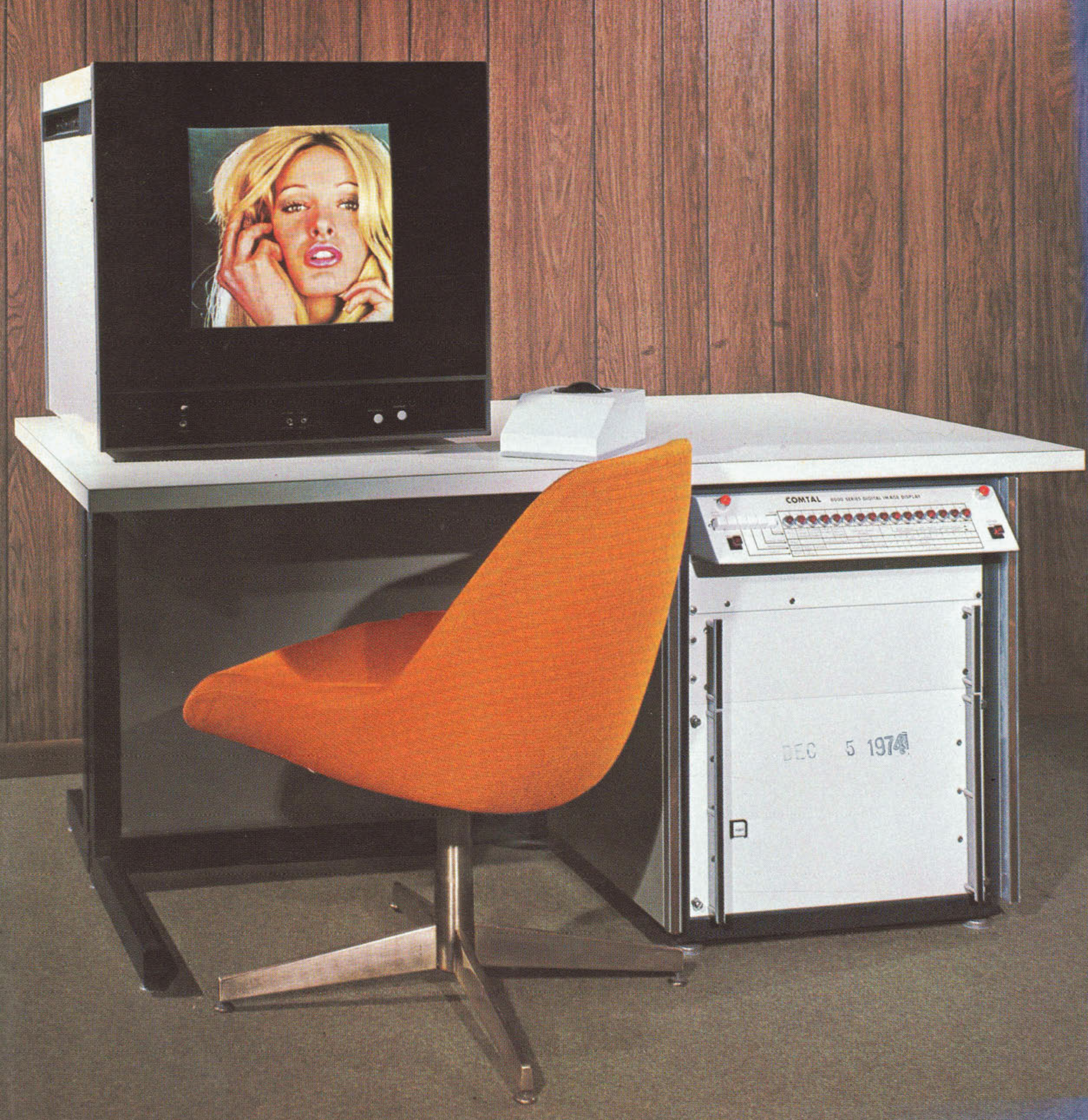
A typical Comtal 8000 setup, as shown in a December 1974 brochure.

Comtal's first commercial product, the Comtal 5000 Series, was offered as a standalone desk console or a peripheral unit to a minicomputer. The 5000 Series comprised a specialized cathode-ray tube monitor and the processor, which could render 24-bit color at a resolution of 512×512, progressive scan. The 5000 Series was released in January 1974.

The Comtal 5000 was one of the very first commercially available devices to incorporate a full color raster framebuffer (and perhaps the first, due to the 1973 Shaded Picture System's buffer being grayscale), in the form of a fixed-head magnetic disk, similar to those produced by Data Disc, albeit with a much higher capacity.

Two months later, Comtal followed up with the 8000 Series, which offered the same color depth and resolution but increased the processing speed by 50 percent, improved the user interface, added the ability to switch from grayscale to color display on the fly, and enlarged the size of the display. In May 1974, the company unveiled the 8300 Series, which allowed the RGB channels to be imported and manipulated separately while adding the ability for a grayscale image to be rendered in false color. Comtal's 1977 Vision One system was dubbed by Business Screen magazine as "one of the most significant breakthroughs in the industry" due to its ability to load custom application software, negating the need for a mainframe or minicomputer. The Vision One offered either a charge-coupled device or 16-bit RAM as memory.

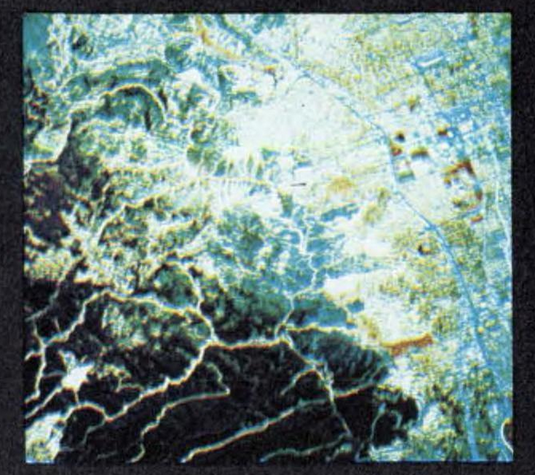
A Comtal 8000 system processing geographic satellite data from NASA in November 1974.

NASA employed Comtal's processors to process the first clear images from the surface of Mars as broadcast by the Viking program's space probes in 1976. NASA also used Comtal's processors to process transmissions of Jupiter by Voyager 2 in 1977. NASA previously commissioned Comtal in 1974 for the creation of the Portable Image Display Systems (PIDS)—an image processor designed for training geologists using sample Landsat satellite imagery as captured by MSS sensors—at the Stennis Space Center's Earth Resources Laboratory.

The company was acquired by 3M in 1980, after which it became known as 3M/Comtal, still based in Pasadena.

== Notable alumni ==
- Peggy Cherng, technical engineer and software department manager from 1975–1982, later co-founder of Panda Express
