= Cherng Family Trust =

Investment trust founded by the co-founders of Panda Restaurant Group,

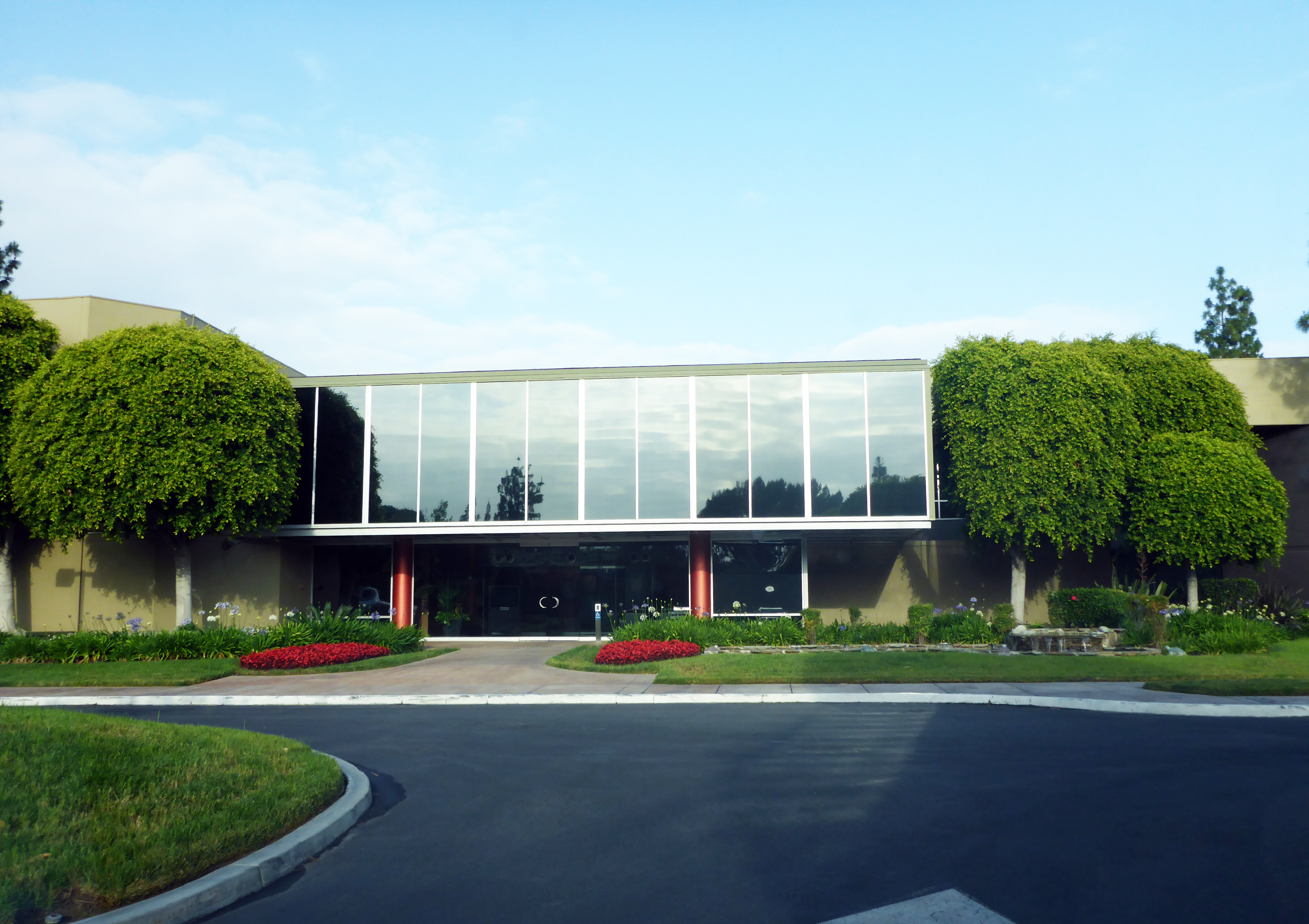
- Offices in Rosemead, California, U.S.
- Company type: Private trust
- Industry: Investment trust
- Founded: 2001; 25 years ago
- Founders: Andrew Cherng and Peggy Cherng
- Headquarters: Rosemead, California, United States
- Website: www.cherngfamilytrust.com

The Cherng Family Trust is an investment trust founded by Andrew Cherng and Peggy Cherng, the co-founders of Panda Restaurant Group, parent company of Panda Express. Founded in 2001, the trust owns Panda Restaurant Group, and has other ownership stakes in a variety of businesses, including an announced ownership stake in the Portland Trail Blazers. The family trust is headquartered in Rosemead, California, and has $3.1 billion in assets.

== History ==
The trust was founded in 2001 by Andrew Cherng and Peggy Cherng. It opened a new office in 2005 that it shares with Panda Restaurant Group. Cherng Family Trust invested in Just Salad starting in 2014. It was part of a group that purchased The Cosmopolitan of Las Vegas' real estate assets in 2021.

The trust purchased an office building in Cypress, California, for $22.1 million in 2021. The trust also opened a retail center in Las Vegas, Blvd, in 2024. In 2025, the trust joined the investment group headed by Tom Dundon to purchase the NBA's Portland Trail Blazers from the estate of Paul G. Allen.
