= Orange chicken =

American Chinese chicken dish

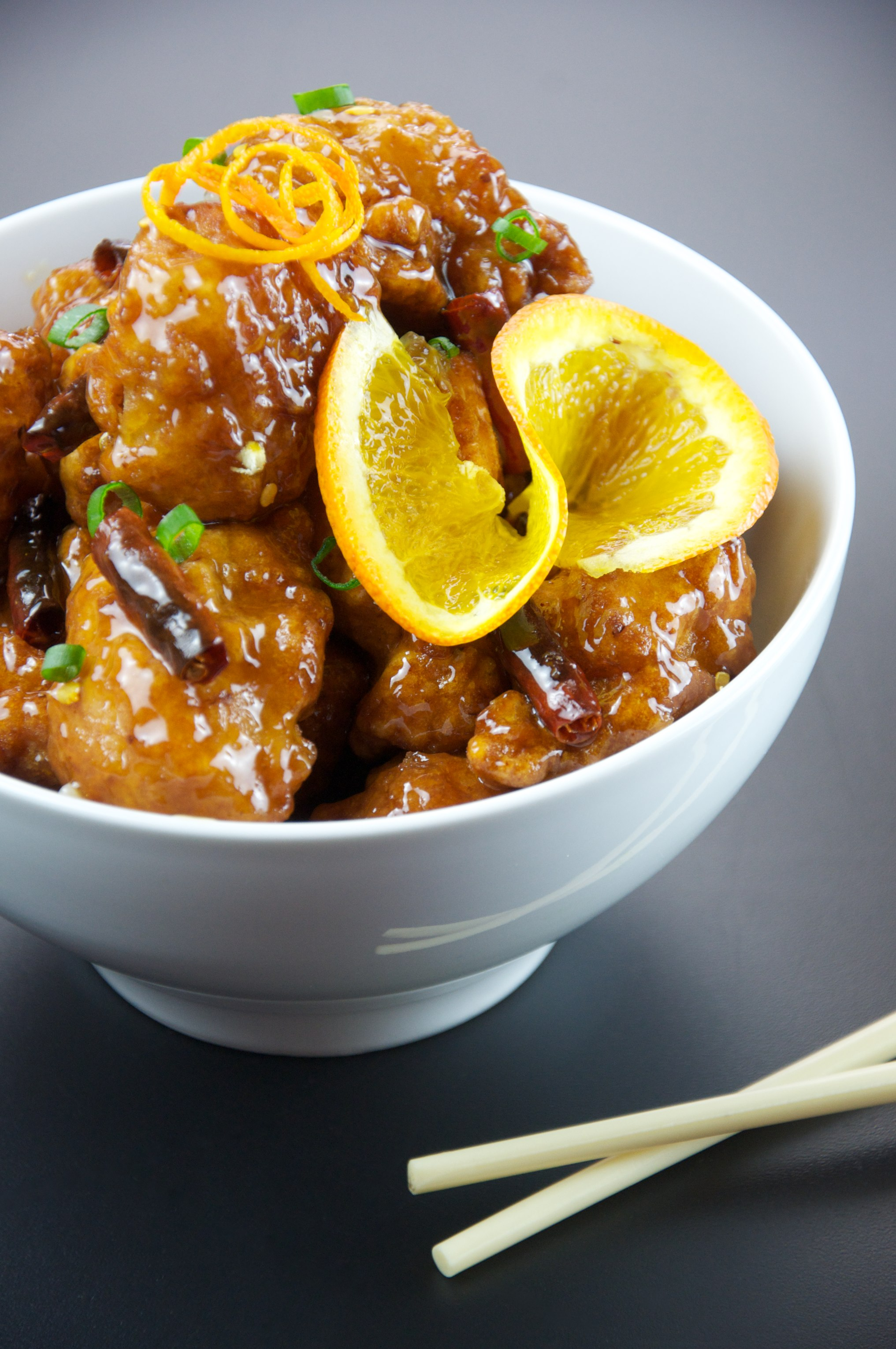
- Course: Main
- Place of origin: United States
- Region or state: Various claims
- Main ingredients: Chicken, orange sauce and/or orange zest

Orange chicken is an American Chinese dish of fried chicken in a sweet orange-flavored chili sauce glaze.

== Origin ==
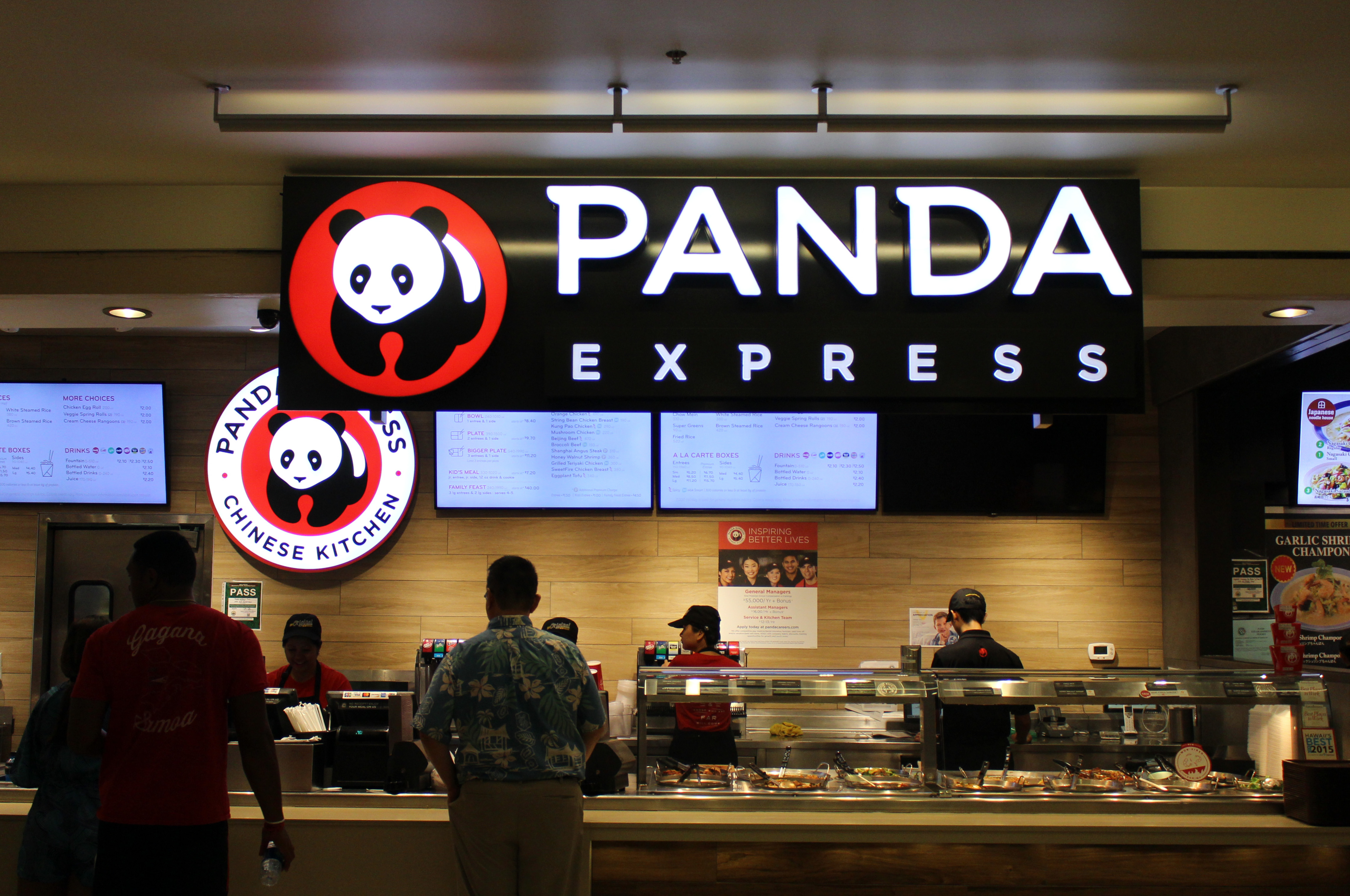
Ala Moana Center Panda Express

The variety of orange chicken most commonly found at North American Chinese restaurants consists of chopped, battered and fried chicken pieces coated in a sweet orange-flavored chili sauce, which thickens or caramelizes to a glaze. According to Panda Express, their executive chef Andy Kao developed the original Chinese-American orange chicken recipe around the time a location opened at Ala Moana Center in Honolulu, Hawaiʻi in 1987, the first location outside of California. Since Panda Express is closely associated with this dish, it uses orange chicken as a promotion tool by having a dedicated food truck tour the country distributing samples of orange chicken.

Orange chicken is called Chinese food in North America, but the dish is rarely found in Chinese restaurants in China. Andrew Cherng, owner and founder of Panda Express, said that orange chicken is a variation of General Tso's chicken, another dish that is almost unknown in China. Journalist Jennifer 8. Lee says that both "General Tso's chicken and Orange Chicken are Americanized mutations of sweet and sour dishes found in China." Orange chicken has also entered the menus of the mainstream U.S. by being served in school cafeterias, and in military bases' chow halls, and also found in the supermarket frozen meal aisle.

Jimmy Wang, executive director of culinary innovation at Panda Express, claims orange chicken is one of the most creative dishes in the past thirty years. In most countries in the Western Hemisphere, the names "orange chicken", "orange peel chicken", "orange-flavored chicken", and "tangerine chicken" are typically used for this particular dish.

This dish may have originally come from the "tangerine chicken" dish from Hunan, China. In Chinese, this dish is known as "陳皮雞", literally "dried citrus peel chicken", referring to dried orange or tangerine peel. However, the taste and recipes of this dish differ due to cultural and geographical factors. The American Chinese dish is claimed to be inspired by mochiko chicken and similar dishes from Hawaiʻi, being initially similar to a chicken wing before being modified. In adapting the dish, the use of tangerine was changed to the use of fresh orange peel or no orange at all. Tangerine is used in traditional Chinese medicine as well as cooking. Tangerine chicken tastes fresh and spicy, but orange chicken tastes sweet and sour. Orange chicken is crispy cooked in a sweet and mildly spicy orange sauce. The sweetness of orange chicken was introduced to cater to American tastes.

== Chinese names ==
This dish may be known as the following in Sinitic languages:

- chen pi ji (traditional Chinese: 陳皮雞; simplified Chinese: 陈皮鸡; pinyin: chénpí jī; Jyutping: caang^{2} pei^{4} gai^{1}; lit. 'chenpi chicken'), which is inaccurate as it actually refers to the Hunan dish with orange peel
- cheng hua ji (traditional Chinese: 橙花雞; simplified Chinese: 橙花鸡; pinyin: chénghuā jī; Jyutping: caang^{4} faa^{1} gai^{1}; lit. 'orange flower chicken'), an unambiguous term
- cheng zi ji (traditional Chinese: 橙子雞; simplified Chinese: 橙子鸡; pinyin: chéngzi jī; Jyutping: caang^{4-2} zi^{1} gai^{1}; lit. 'orange chicken'), a calque.

== Popularity ==
Orange chicken is the signature dish of the American fast-food chain Panda Express, which sells over 100 million pounds of it every year.

== See also ==
- Crispy fried chicken
- General Tso's chicken
- Kung Pao chicken
- Lemon chicken
- List of chicken dishes
- Pineapple chicken
- Sesame chicken
- Sweet and sour chicken
- White cut chicken
