= Laemmle Theatres =

Arthouse movie theatre chain in the Los Angeles area

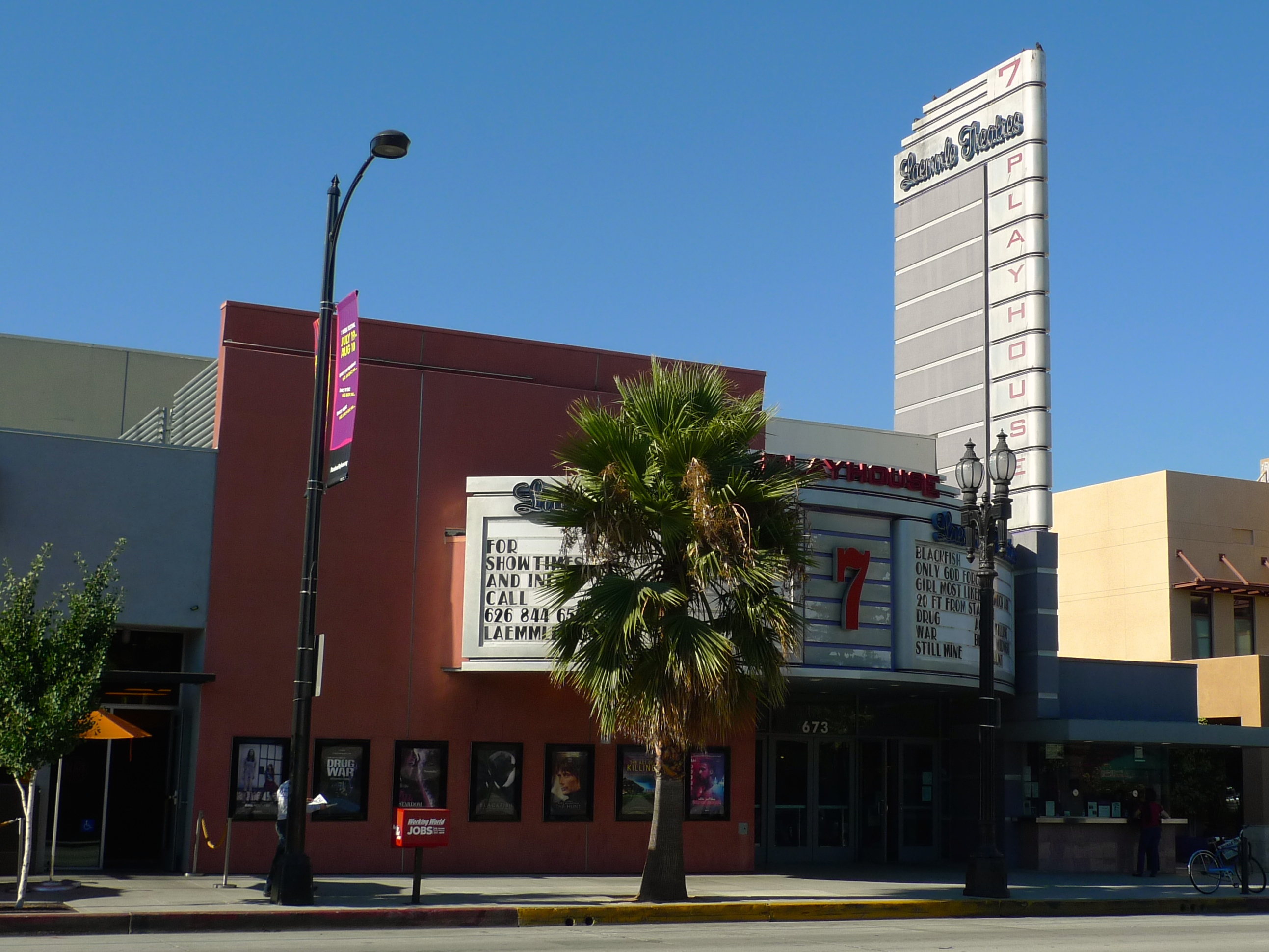
- Playhouse 7 in Pasadena, California
- Type: Private
- Industry: Entertainment
- Founded: 1938; 88 years ago
- Founder: Max and Kurt Laemmle
- Number of locations: 7
- Area served: Los Angeles County, California
- Services: Movie theater, Academy Award qualification
- Owner: Greg Laemmle
- Website: www.laemmle.com

Laemmle Theatres (/ˈlɛmli/ LEM-lee) is an American arthouse movie theater chain with seven locations, all in Los Angeles County, California.

== History ==
The chain is owned and operated by Greg Laemmle. The company's first theater was bought in 1938 by Greg's grandfather Max and great uncle Kurt, both cousins of Universal Pictures founder Carl Laemmle, and was located in Highland Park.

The Laemmle Grande 4-Plex on South Figueroa Street closed October 25, 2009 as L.A. Live's Regal Cinema complex was set to open.

In December 2011, the Glendale City Council and Redevelopment Agency approved a $12.8 million development that included 42 residential units, a 5-screen Laemmle theater, and a Panda Inn. Construction began in mid-2015 and the complex opened in August 2018.

Construction of Newhall 7 was completed in 2020, but its opening was delayed due to the COVID-19 pandemic. It opened on April 9, 2021 and with Glendale 5 reopening on May 21, 2021, Laemmle Theatres resumed operating all its locations that had been open prior to the COVID-19 pandemic.

The chain formerly operated the Playhouse 7 in Pasadena which ceased operations in June 2022.

== Locations ==
Laemmle Theatres currently has seven locations:

- Claremont 5 in Claremont
- Glendale 5 in Glendale
- Monica Film Center in Santa Monica
- Royal Theatre in West Los Angeles
- Town Center 5 in Encino
- NoHo 7 in North Hollywood
- Newhall 7 in Newhall

== Oscar qualifying ==
During the 21st century, the Laemmle venues have come to be known as the "Secret Path to Oscar Qualifying" since they have been repeatedly used by independent films, short films, and documentaries for that purpose. Laemmle provides services designed to enable a film to qualify for Academy Awards, charging a flat rate for exhibition while giving the film's producers 100 percent of the box office receipts; they have someone meet every year with the Academy committees in all the categories to ensure their "qualifying run" bookings actually qualify. They even help film-makers book their films outside of their own theaters if a committee requires that.

== In media ==
Laemmle Theatres are the subject of the 2022 documentary Only in Theaters, directed by Raphael Sbarge.

In 2024, Greg Laemmle and Raphael Sbarge started the podcast Inside the Arthouse, recorded inside the Laemmle Royal. The podcast is an insider's perspective on filmmakers and those responsible for screening arthouse films across the United States.
