= Waldorf Astoria Las Vegas =

Luxury hotel in Paradise, Nevada

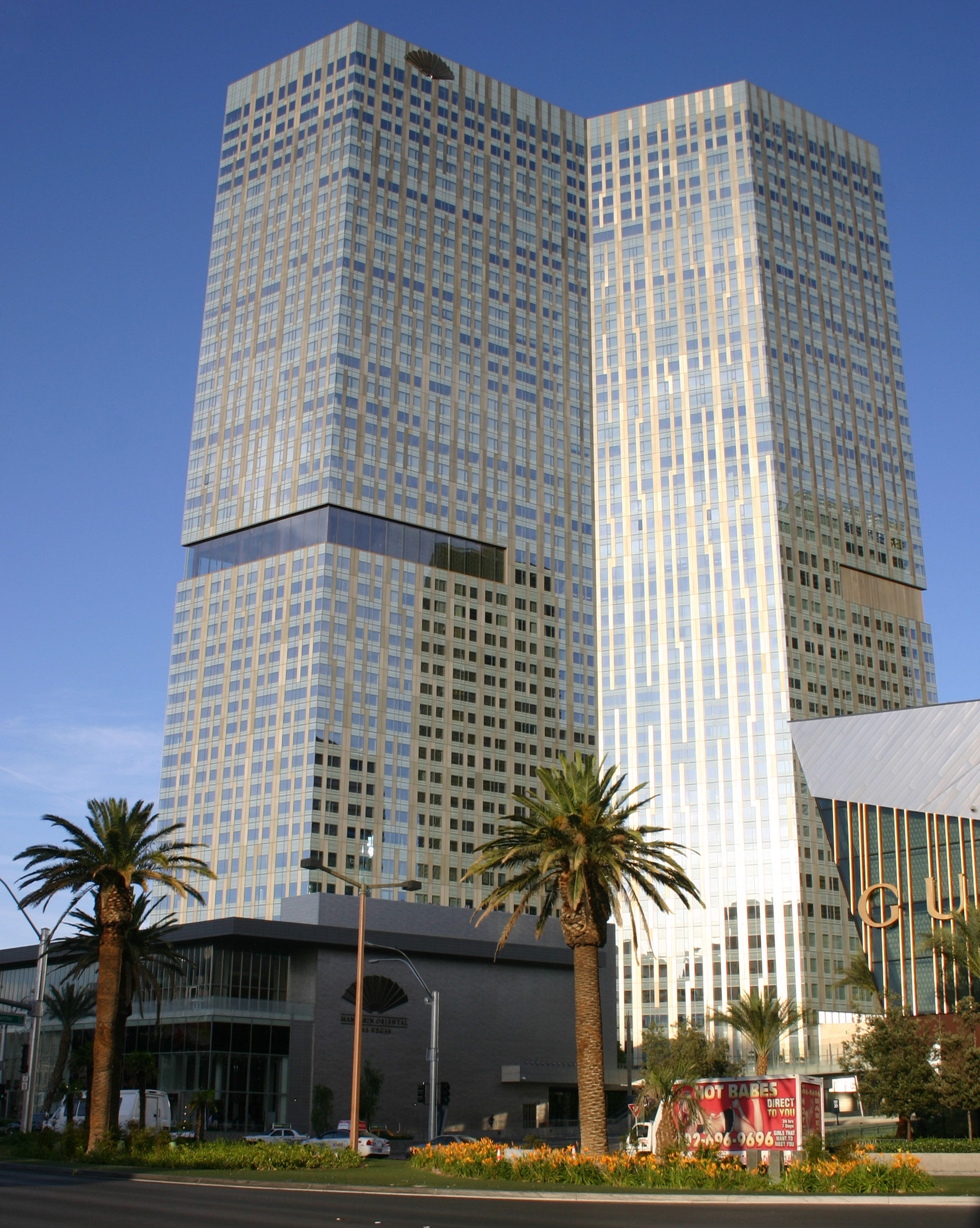
- Mandarin Oriental in 2011, seen from across the Las Vegas Strip

- Location within Las Vegas Strip Location within Nevada
- Former names: Mandarin Oriental, Las Vegas (2009–2018)
- Hotel chain: Waldorf Astoria

General information
- Status: Operating
- Type: Hotel & condominium
- Location: Paradise, Nevada, 3752 South Las Vegas Boulevard
- Coordinates: 36°6′22.50″N 115°10′27.50″W
- Opening: December 4, 2009 (Mandarin Oriental); August 30, 2018 (Waldorf Astoria)
- Owner: Tiffany Lam; Andrew Cherng; Peggy Cherng
- Operator: Hilton Worldwide

Technical details
- Floor count: 47

Design and construction
- Architects: Kohn Pedersen Fox, AAI Architects, Inc. (as architect of record)

Other information
- Number of rooms: 389 hotel rooms & 225 condominiums

Website
- hilton.com...

The Waldorf Astoria Las Vegas, formerly the Mandarin Oriental, Las Vegas, is a 47-story luxury hotel and condominium building in the CityCenter complex on the Las Vegas Strip in Paradise, Nevada. It is managed by Hilton Worldwide as part of the Waldorf Astoria Hotels & Resorts brand. It is owned by Tiffany Lam and Andrew and Peggy Cherng.

The hotel was originally owned by MGM Mirage and Dubai World, and operated by Mandarin Oriental Hotel Group as part of its luxury chain. It opened on December 4, 2009, occupying the former site of the Boardwalk hotel-casino. The Mandarin Oriental Las Vegas was rebranded under the Waldorf Astoria name on August 30, 2018, following a $214 million purchase by Lam and the Cherngs. The hotel has 389 rooms leading up to the sky lobby on the 23rd floor. The upper floors contain 225 condominium residences.

== History ==
The property began as the Mandarin Oriental, Las Vegas. It was announced in September 2005, as part of MGM Mirage's CityCenter project. Mandarin Oriental Hotel Group (MOHG) would manage the hotel, which would be owned by MGM and partner Dubai World. The hotel was built at the southeastern corner of CityCenter, occupying the former site of the Boardwalk hotel-casino.

Mandarin Oriental, Las Vegas was designed by Kohn Pedersen Fox, with architect of record AAI Architects, Inc. and hotel interiors by Adam Tihany. The residential component was designed by Kay Lang and Associates. The hotel received a LEED Gold certification on November 20, 2009.

Mandarin Oriental, Las Vegas opened on December 4, 2009. It was the third component to open at CityCenter, following Vdara and Crystals. It was hoped that Mandarin Oriental, a well-known brand outside of the U.S., would help attract foreign visitors to CityCenter. The hotel offered a focus on personalized customer service, and it aimed to attract a high-end clientele. Mandarin Oriental also had the largest and most expensive condos at CityCenter, with an average listing price of $2 million.

Mandarin Oriental opened amid the Great Recession, and saw a disappointing financial performance during its first year, prompting increased marketing and promotions. MOHG viewed the property as a long-term investment.

In 2018, MGM and Dubai World sold the hotel for $214 million to hotel investor Tiffany Lam and Panda Express founders Andrew and Peggy Cherng. In conjunction with the sale, MOHG ceased managing the property on August 31, 2018, and Hilton assumed management, rebranding it as a Waldorf Astoria. The hotel's Asian theme would be removed during renovations, which took place from 2021 to 2024.

== Facilities ==
The Waldorf Astoria is 47 stories. It contains 389 hotel rooms and suites, and 225 condominiums, as well as a two-floor spa, 12,000 sq ft (1,100 m^{2}) of meeting space, and a pool.

Hotel rooms occupy the first 22 floors. The hotel's original 12,000 sq ft (1,100 m^{2}) lobby, known upon opening as Sky Lobby, was located on the 23rd floor. At the time, the property was one of three Mandarin Oriental hotels in the world to include a Sky Lobby. The remaining floors are occupied by condos, with seven penthouses taking up the upper floors. The property has separate entrances for residents and hotel guests. Mandarin Oriental was among the most technologically advanced hotels in Las Vegas at the time of its opening. Rooms included a touch-screen device capable of ordering food service and controlling features such as lighting.

Mandarin Oriental opened along with Twist, a 74-seat French restaurant by chef Pierre Gagnaire, marking his U.S. debut. Located in the Sky Lobby, it included floor-to-ceiling views of the Strip. Lighting was provided by 300 golden globes, hung from the ceiling. The restaurant was designed by Tihany, and included a glass staircase leading to a wine loft. Other food and beverage amenities included a sushi and noodle bar, a high tea lounge, and a pastry shop.

In 2017, the Sky Lobby introduced a humanoid robot assistant named Pepper to greet guests and provide information. In 2023, the lobby was moved to the ground level as part of renovation work, while the Peacock Alley tea lounge will take the vacated space on the 23rd floor. Rooms and meeting space were also updated.

== Accolades ==
Within a year of opening, Mandarin Oriental received the AAA Five Diamond Award. In 2011, the spa was named by Forbes Travel Guide as a Five-Star recipient. Two years later, readers of Travel + Leisure named the Mandarin Oriental among the best hotels in Nevada. U.S. News & World Report, in its 2017 Best Hotels Rankings, also named it as the top hotel in Las Vegas. In 2024, readers of Travel + Leisure voted it the best hotel in Las Vegas.

== Gallery ==
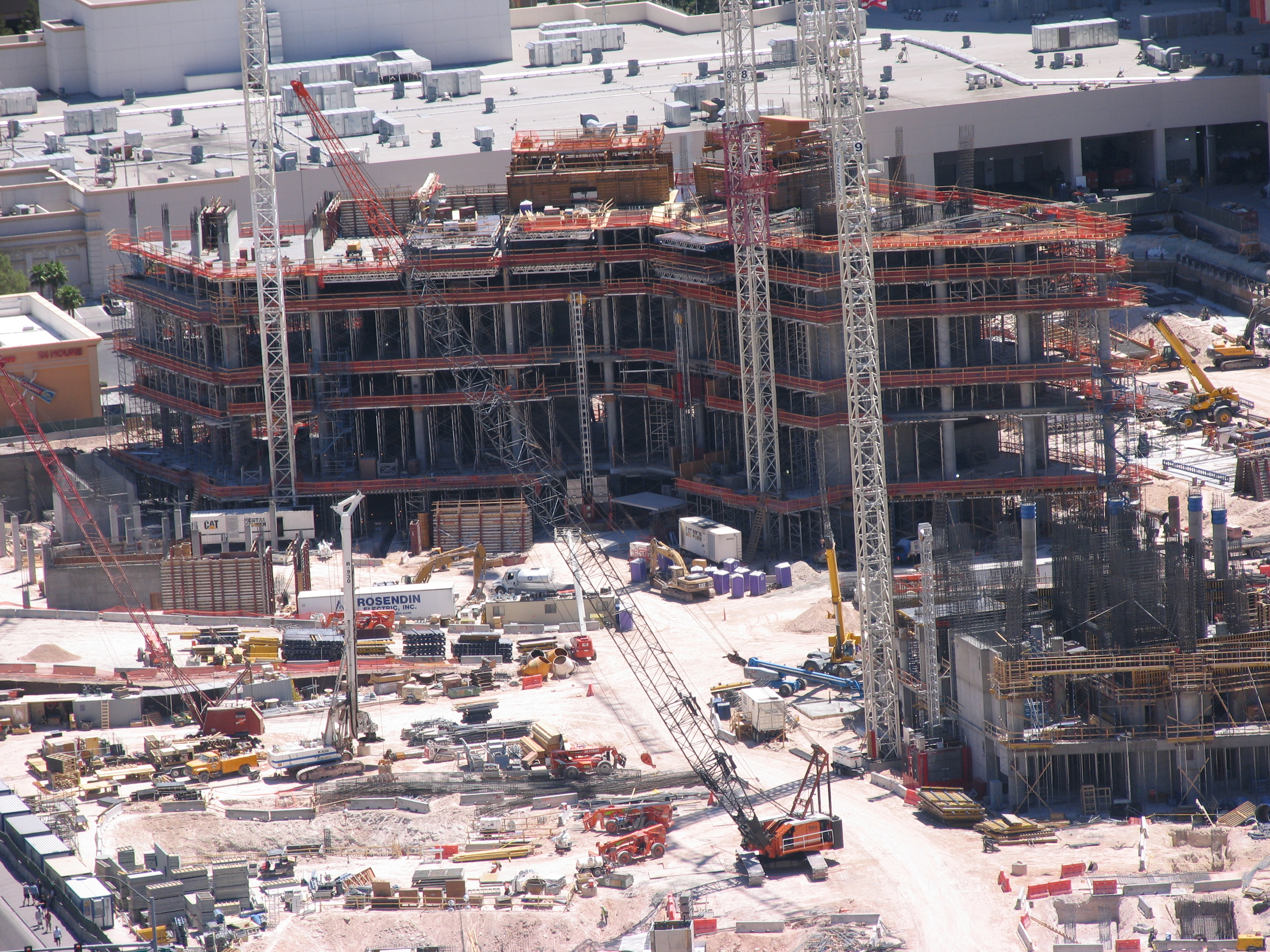
Construction progress in June 2007

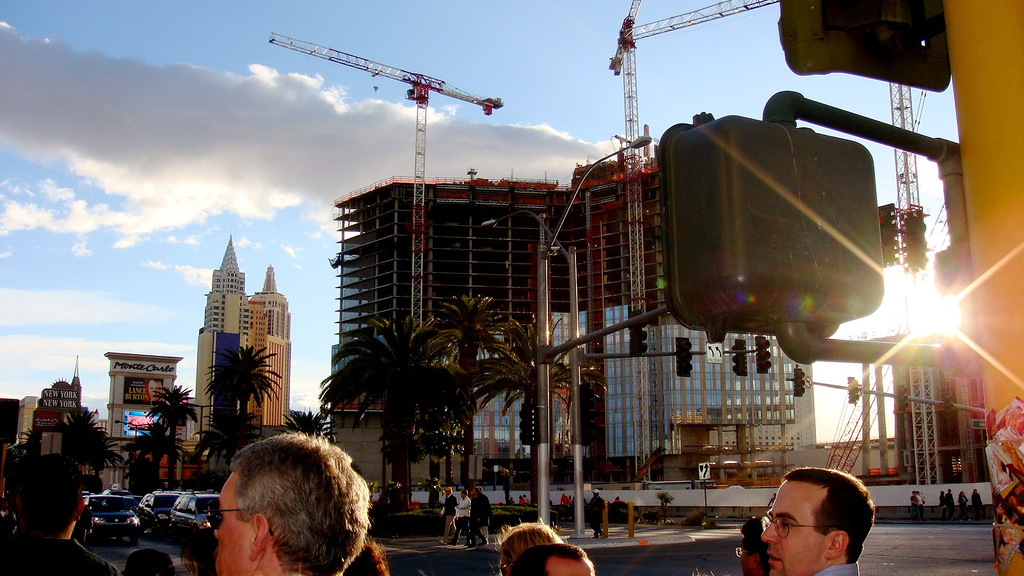
Construction progress in January 2008

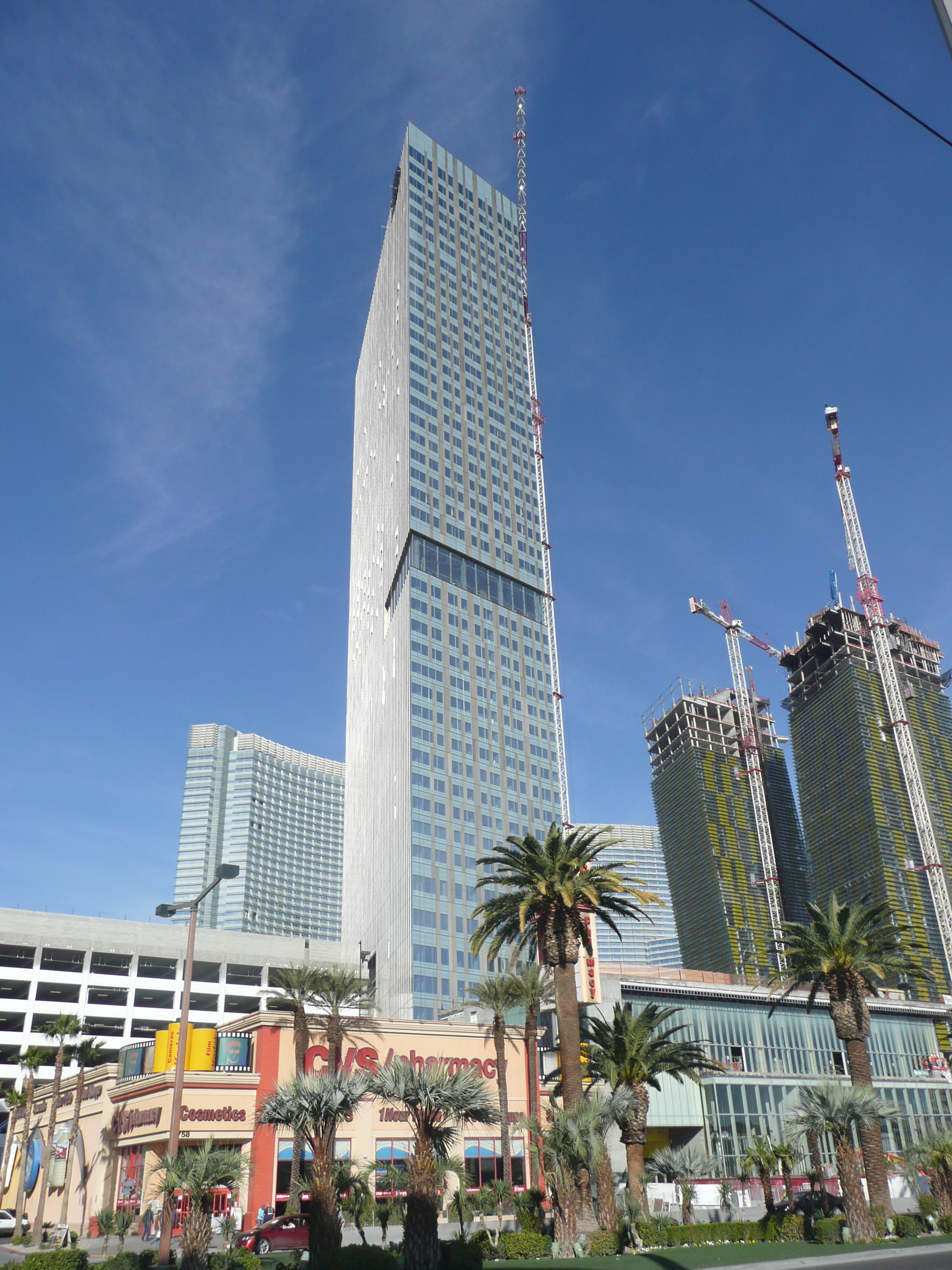
Construction progress in February 2009

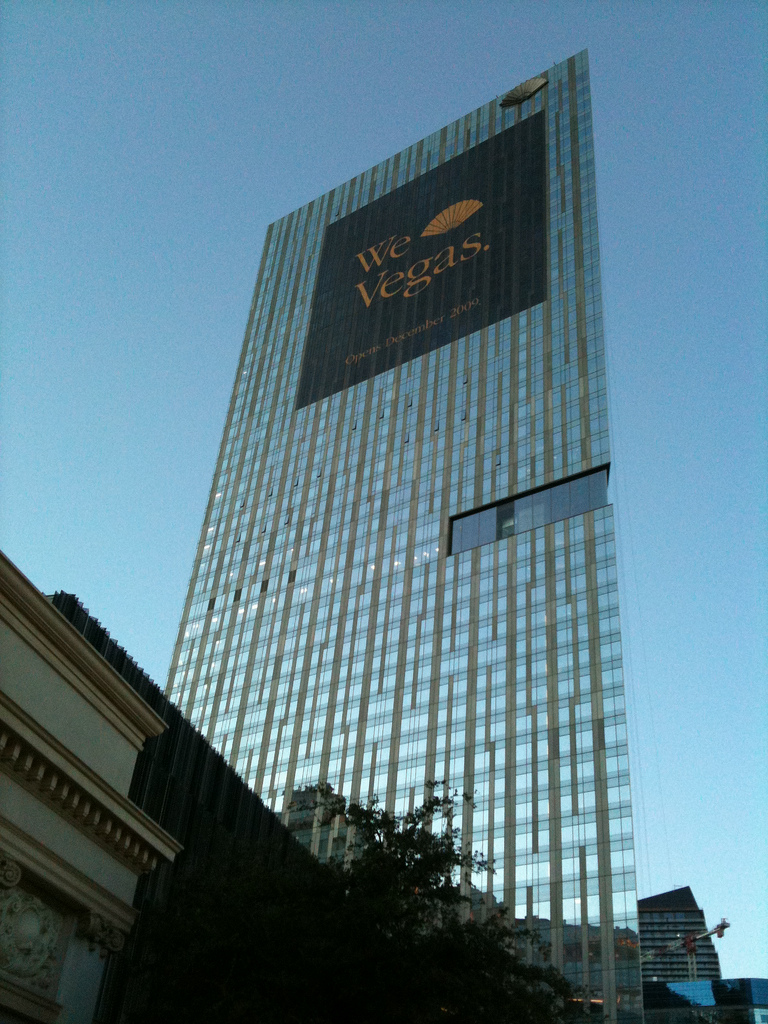
One month prior to opening

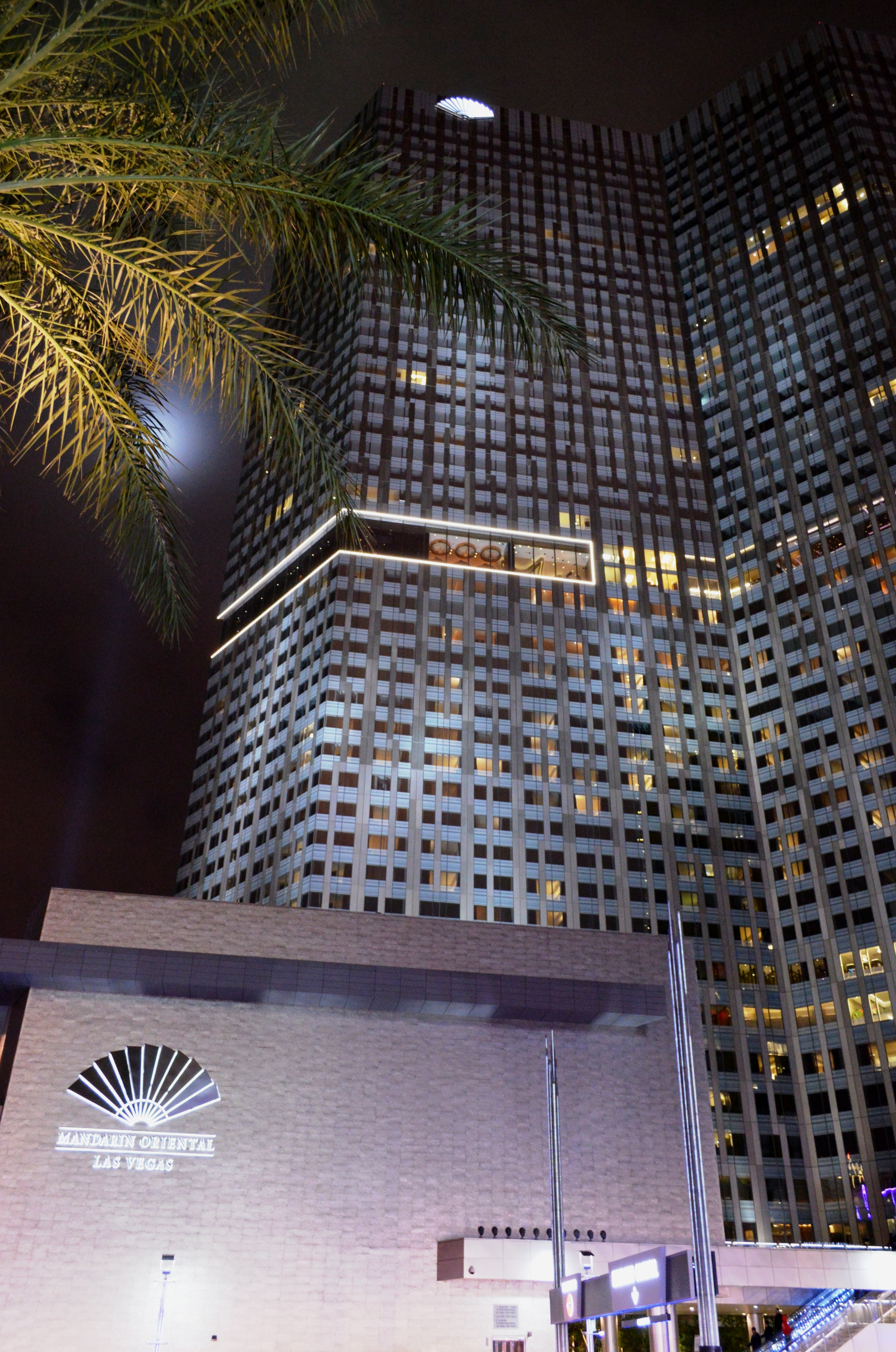
Mandarin Oriental at night

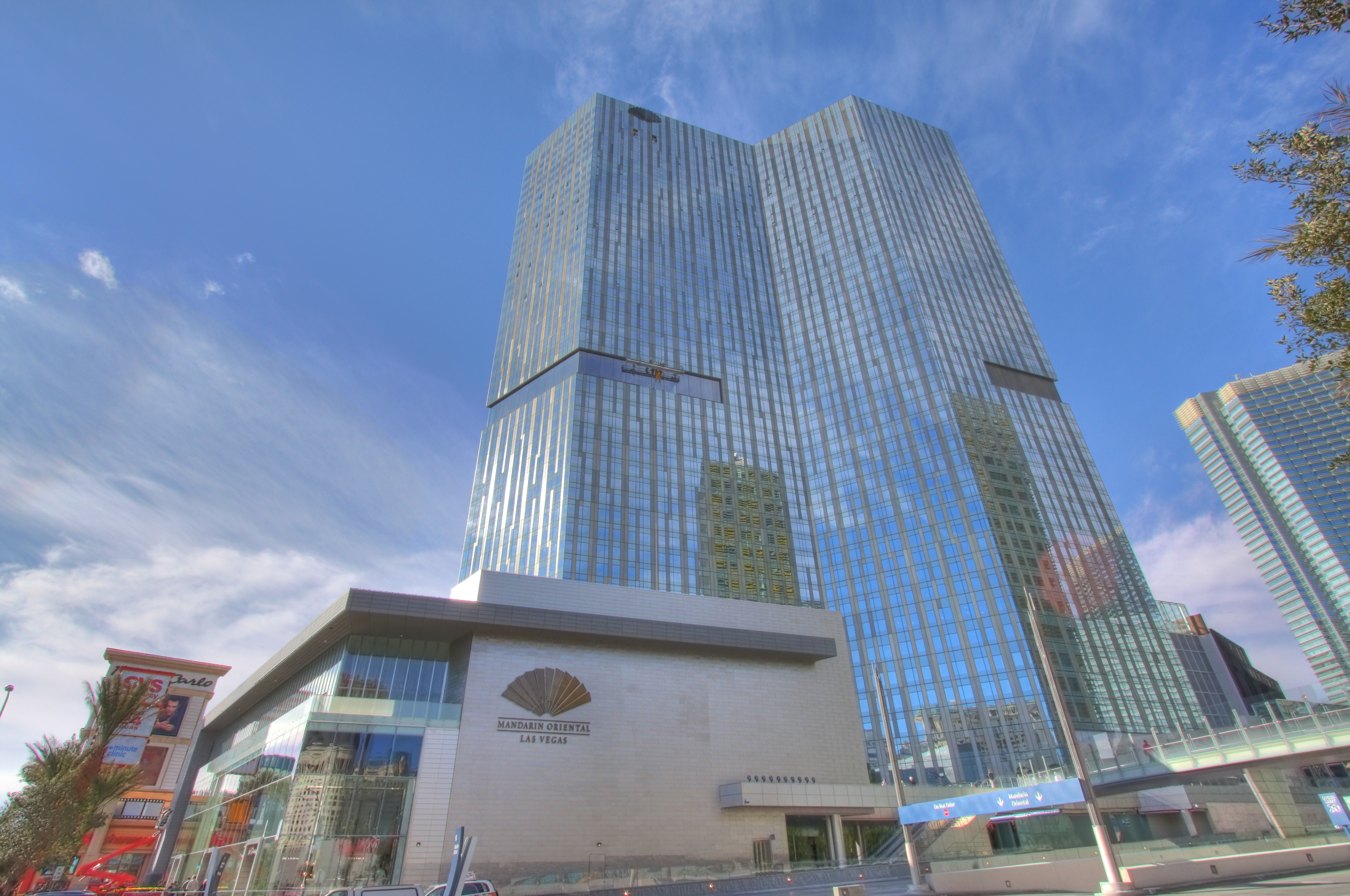
Seen from CityCenter's main entry road

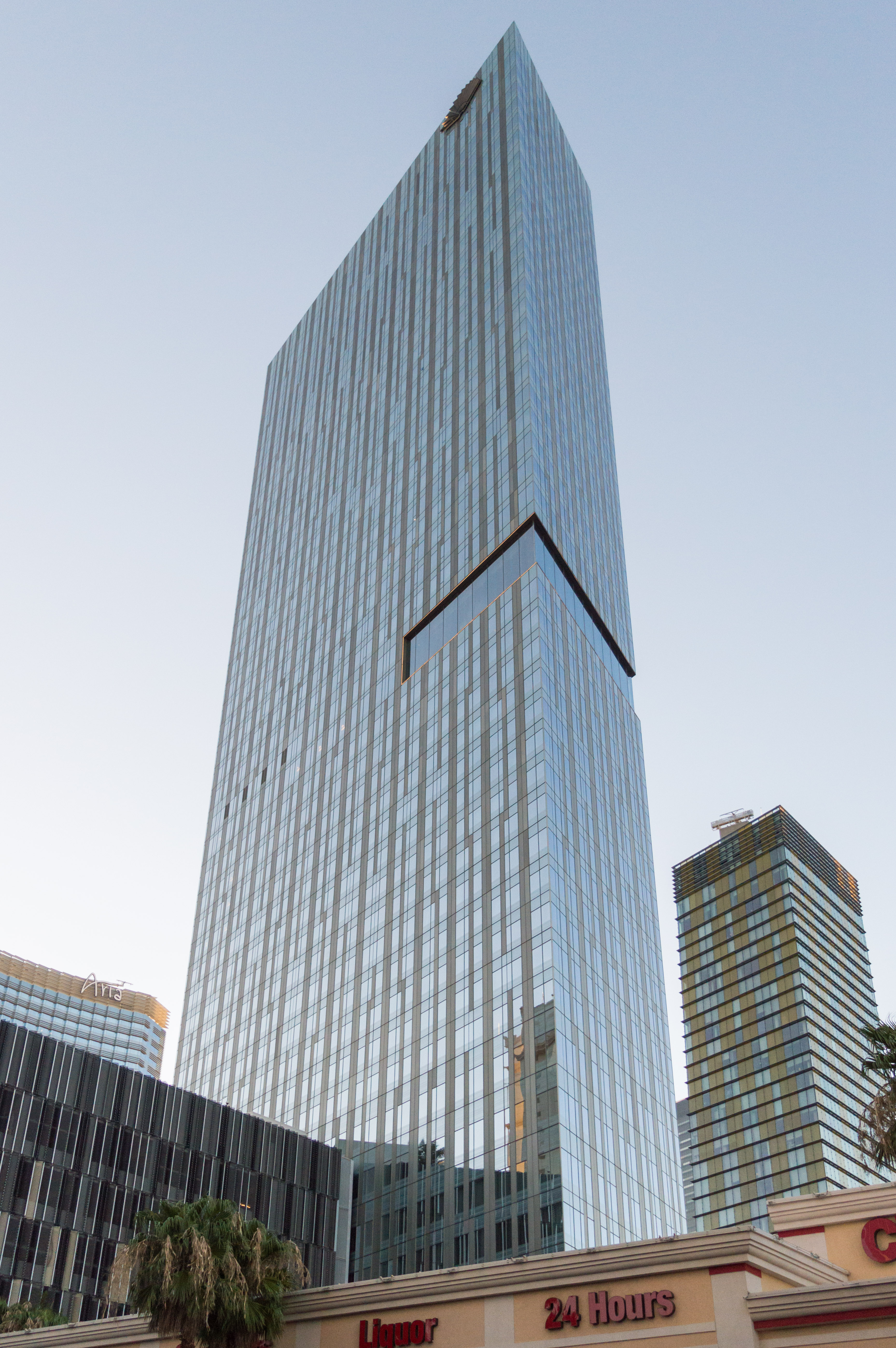
South side of the hotel

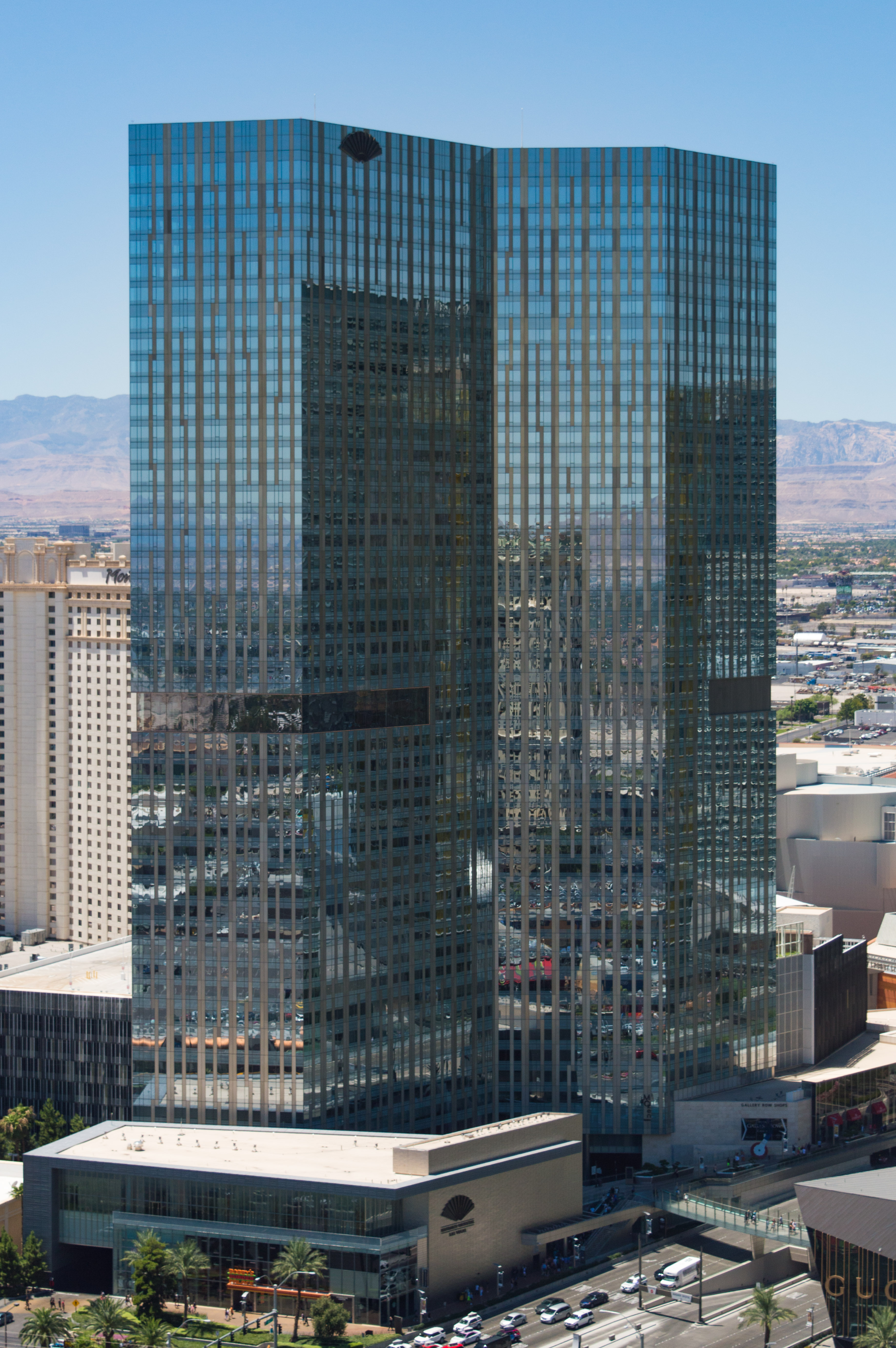
View from Marriott's Grand Chateau

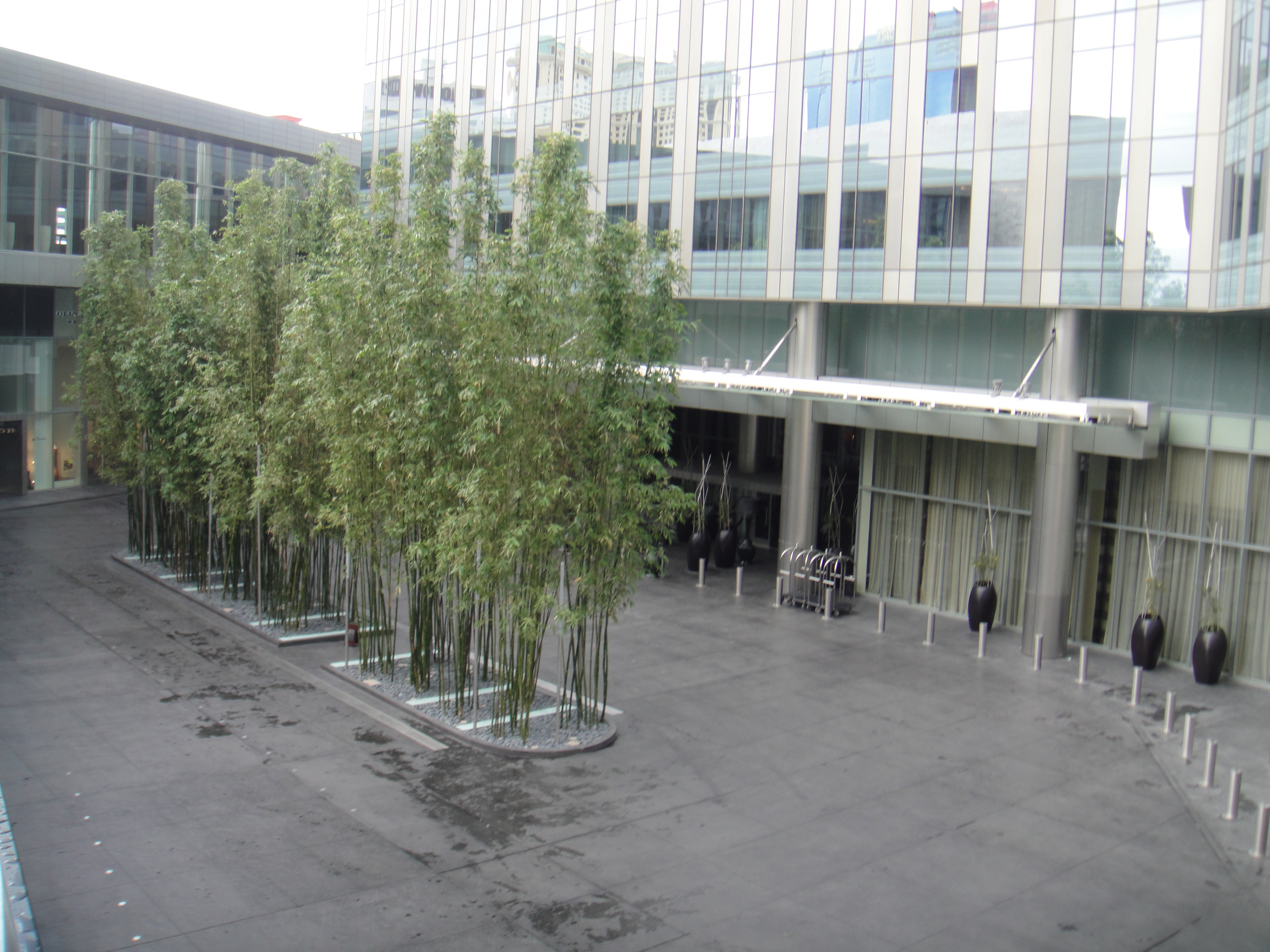
Main porte-cochere entry

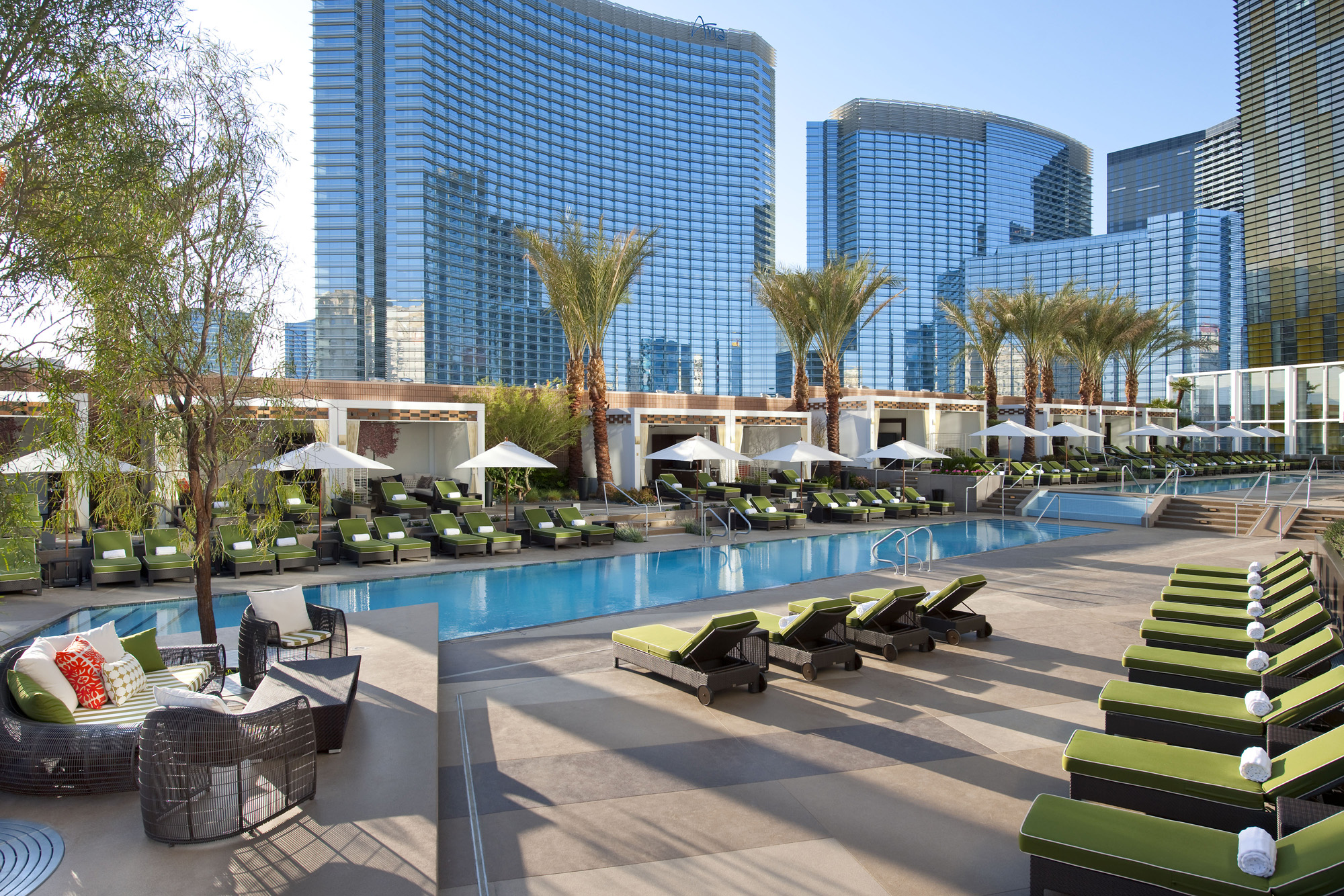
Pool area

== See also ==
- List of tallest buildings in Las Vegas
