= Boardwalk Hotel and Casino =

Historic hotel and casino in Las Vegas, Nevada

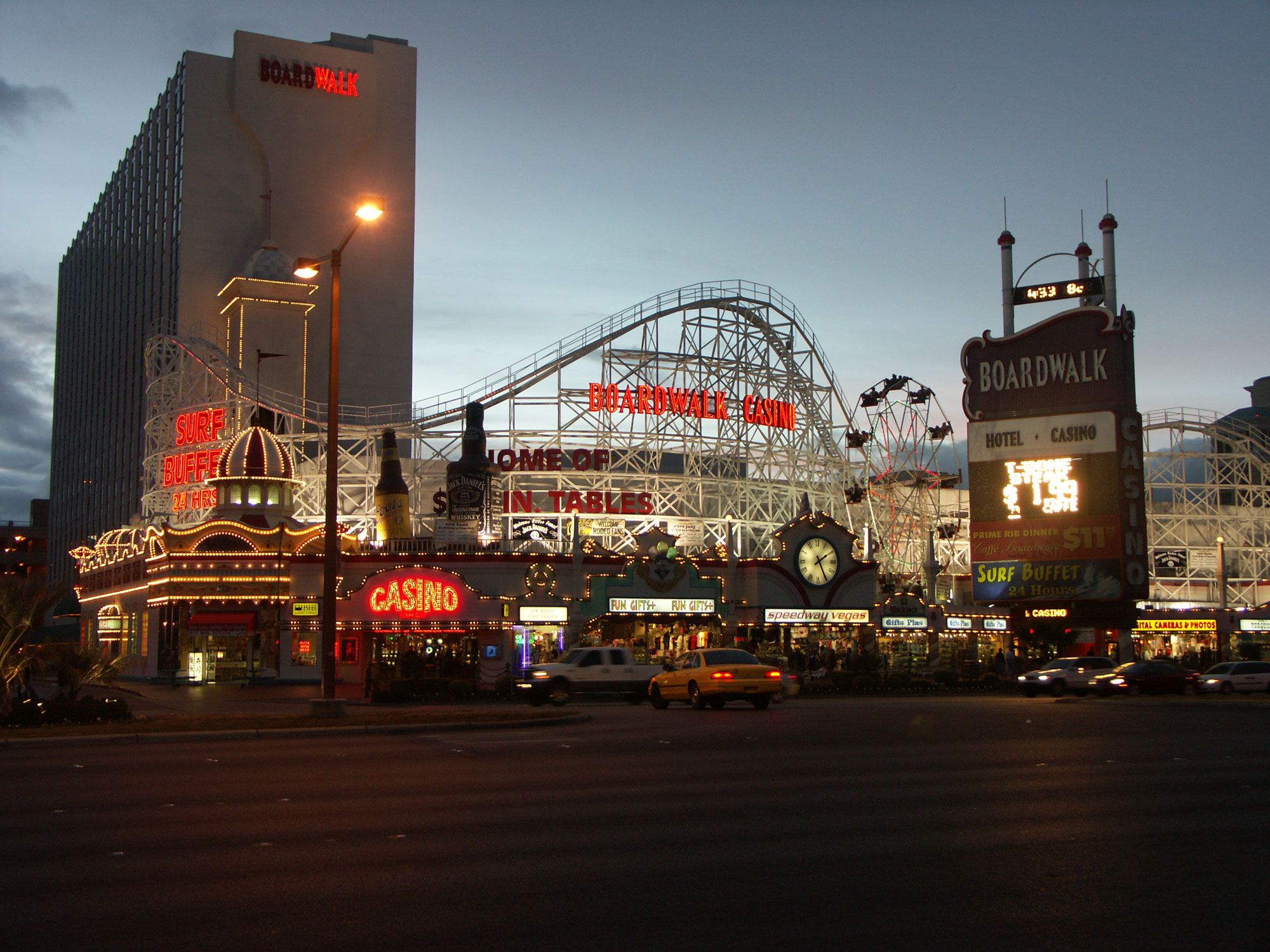
- The Boardwalk in 2004

- Location within Las Vegas Strip Location within Nevada
- Interactive map of Boardwalk Hotel and Casino
- Location: Paradise, Nevada; 3750 South Las Vegas Blvd; 36°6′24″N 115°10′27″W
- Opened: 1966 (Holiday Inn); 1989 (Boardwalk)
- Closed: January 9, 2006; 20 years ago
- Theme: Coney Island
- No. of rooms: 653
- Gaming space: 33,000 sq ft (3,100 m^{2})
- Casino type: Land-based
- Owner: MGM Mirage
- Architect: Homer Rissman (Holiday Inn, 1966)
- Previous names: Holiday Inn (1966–1985); Viscount (1985–1989); Boardwalk (1989–2006)
- Renovated in: 1968, 1995–96

The Boardwalk Hotel and Casino (Note: Variations of the "Boardwalk" name were in use throughout the property's history, including Boardwalk Hotel & Casino, Boardwalk Holiday Inn, Holiday Inn Boardwalk, and Holiday Inn Casino Boardwalk.) was a Coney Island-style hotel on the Las Vegas Strip. The property began in 1966, as a Holiday Inn. Norbert Jansen added a gift shop to the hotel in 1972, and later opened the Slot Joynt casino. In 1985, Jansen renamed the Holiday Inn as the Viscount Hotel, part of a U.S. chain. Four years later, he merged Slot Joynt with the Viscount and renamed them as the Boardwalk. It rejoined the Holiday Inn chain in 1994, through a franchise deal which eventually ended in 2002.

A carnival facade was added in 1995, featuring non-functional ride replicas. A 15-story tower was finished in 1996, giving the Boardwalk a total of 653 rooms. The casino was also enlarged, bringing it to 33,000 sq ft (3,100 m^{2}). The resort occupied 8 acres (3.2 ha). It was popular for its cheap food and rooms, and its small size compared to nearby megaresorts.

In 1998, the Boardwalk was sold to Mirage Resorts, which later became MGM Mirage. The resort closed on January 9, 2006, to help make way for MGM's 67-acre (27 ha) CityCenter project. The hotel's main tower was imploded on May 9, 2006. The former Boardwalk site is now occupied by CityCenter's Waldorf Astoria hotel.

== History ==
The Boardwalk began as a 138-room Holiday Inn hotel with a restaurant, cocktail lounge, and meeting space with a capacity for 100 people. Located at 3740 South Las Vegas Boulevard, the hotel was designed by architect Homer Rissman, and was completed in 1966. It opened with a six-floor tower.

In March 1966, employees of the Holiday Inn, who were represented by the Culinary Workers Union, began picketing in front of the hotel, alleging that they did not receive wages and conditions that were standard for the area. Holiday Inn denied the claim, stating that wages and conditions were equal to or above local standards. The union ultimately lost its fight.

A second hotel tower opened in 1968, and the hotel later became known as Holiday Inn South and Holiday Inn South Strip, differentiating it from other Las Vegas locations such as the Holiday Inn Center Strip.

In October 1975, the hotel's innkeeper died in a fire that was believed to have been started by a cigarette. The fire was confined to the innkeeper's room on the fifth floor, and caused approximately $40,000 in damage. Guests of the fifth floor were evacuated, and approximately 10 were treated for smoke inhalation.

Norbert Jansen, former owner of Pioneer Club, had opened a gift shop, Holiday Gifts, at the hotel in 1972. It was later renamed Holiday Gifts South. Avis Jansen, Norbert's wife, eventually sought to install 15 slot machines at the gift shop. However, the Nevada Gaming Control Board voted against this proposal in December 1977. She had been rejected due to the fact that her husband was the landlord of the business; he had previously been convicted of tax evasion in the 1960s, and was also involved in a company that filed bankruptcy. By 1981, the Jansens had opened a casino known as Slot Joynt, which later became part of the hotel.

In 1985, with little fanfare, the Jansens renamed the Holiday Inn as the Viscount Hotel, part of a chain with 14 other locations in the U.S. At that time, the six-story hotel included 204 rooms.

In 1989, Jansen proposed the addition of a 21-story working slot machine, the world's largest, to be built in front of Slot Joynt. However, this idea was rejected by the Clark County Commission. Despite receiving approval later that year, Jansen decided against the idea due to its rising cost, going from $5 million to $7 million.

=== Boardwalk (1989–2006) ===
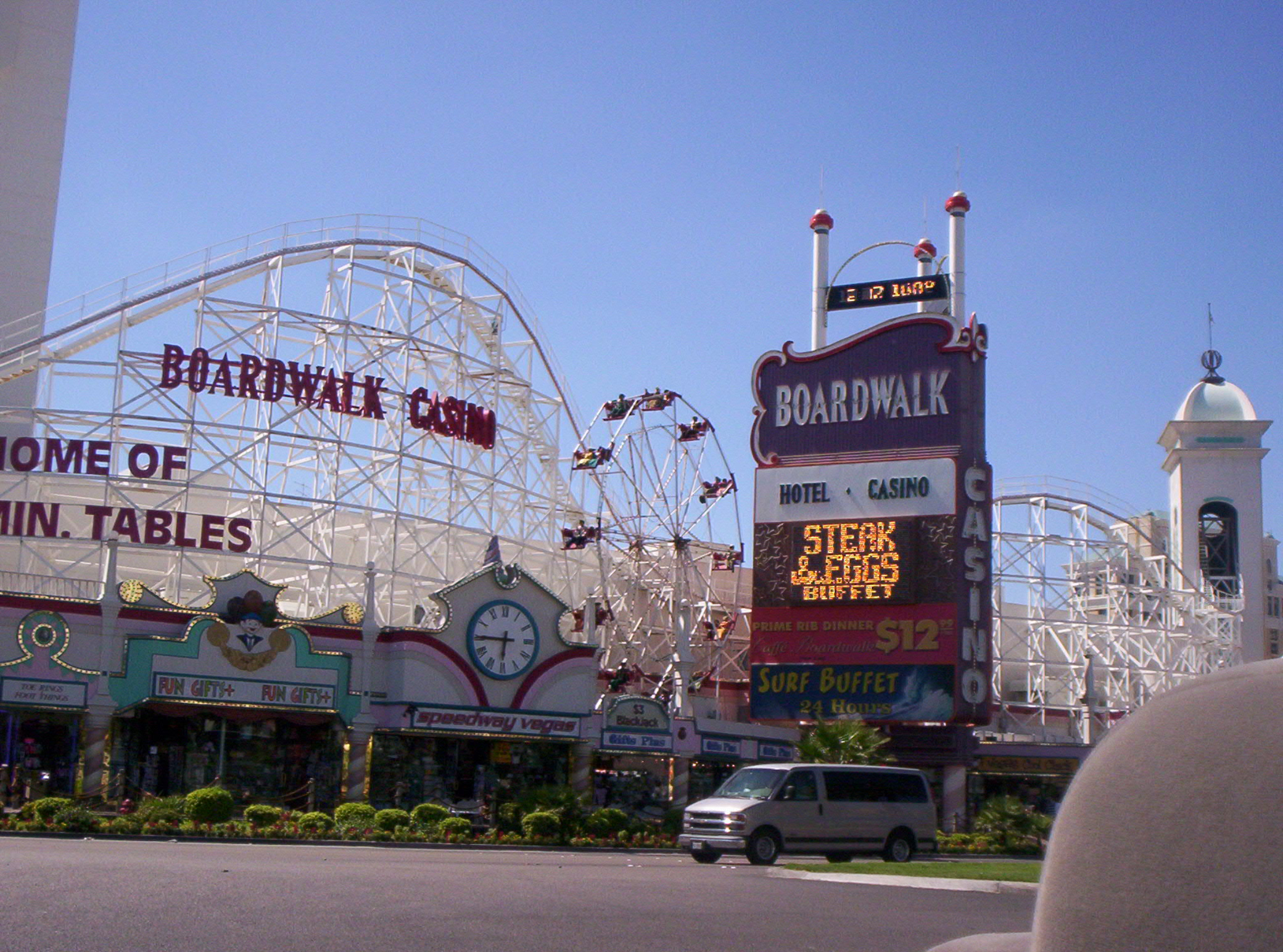
The Boardwalk's carnival facade

In February 1989, Jansen converted the Viscount and Slot Joynt into the Boardwalk Hotel and Casino. Boardwalk Casino Inc. became a public company in February 1994, following an initial public offering. Two months later, plans were announced for a $9 million renovation and expansion that would include the enlargement of the casino, which measured 15,000 sq ft (1,400 m^{2}).

Close-up of the clown face

The hotel rejoined the Holiday Inn chain through a new franchise deal later in 1994, and a Coney Island theme was added shortly thereafter. A carnival facade was built in 1995, adding non-functional replicas of a parachute drop, roller coaster, and Ferris wheel, as well as a giant clown face and retail shops. The casino was also expanded, and a 15-floor, 451-room tower was finished in 1996. That year, Jacobs Entertainment, Inc. made a $9 million investment in the Boardwalk. In 1997, the resort added the 370-seat Surf Buffet, which ran a television commercial starring professional boxer Butterbean.

Jansen, speaking about his earlier proposal for a giant slot machine, said in 1995: "It's not officially dead. But I'd say that it's dying, that I probably won't see it in my lifetime". Jansen died of cancer in January 1997, at the age of 78. Avis Jansen continued to operate the gift shop until the Boardwalk's closure.

The Boardwalk occupied 8 acres (3.2 ha). In December 1997, Mirage Resorts agreed to purchase the resort and three adjacent parcels for $135 million. The $105 million Boardwalk sale was approved by the Nevada Gaming Commission in June 1998. At the time, the Boardwalk included 650 employees, 653 rooms and a 33,000 sq ft (3,100 m^{2}) casino. Minor improvements were planned for the Boardwalk, with no immediate plans to replace it.

A decision to expand or replace the Boardwalk was expected within three or four years. However, Mirage Resorts was acquired by MGM Grand, Inc. in 2000, forming MGM Mirage. The newly formed company delayed its plans for a redevelopment of the Boardwalk site, choosing instead to focus on its new Borgata resort, opened in Atlantic City in 2003. MGM took its time on a Boardwalk replacement, which was contingent on the success of Borgata. The Holiday Inn name was dropped in 2002.

In November 2004, MGM announced plans for CityCenter, a mixed-use project that would be built on 67 acres (27 ha), including the Boardwalk site. The Boardwalk closed on January 9, 2006. It had been popular for its cheap food and rooms, as well as its small size compared to nearby megaresorts. Columnist John L. Smith of the Las Vegas Review-Journal called the Boardwalk "a testament to the local belief that even a terribly tacky joint -- one with an Atlantic City theme, for crying out loud -- can grind out a cash flow if it happens to be located in the heart of the action on the Strip".

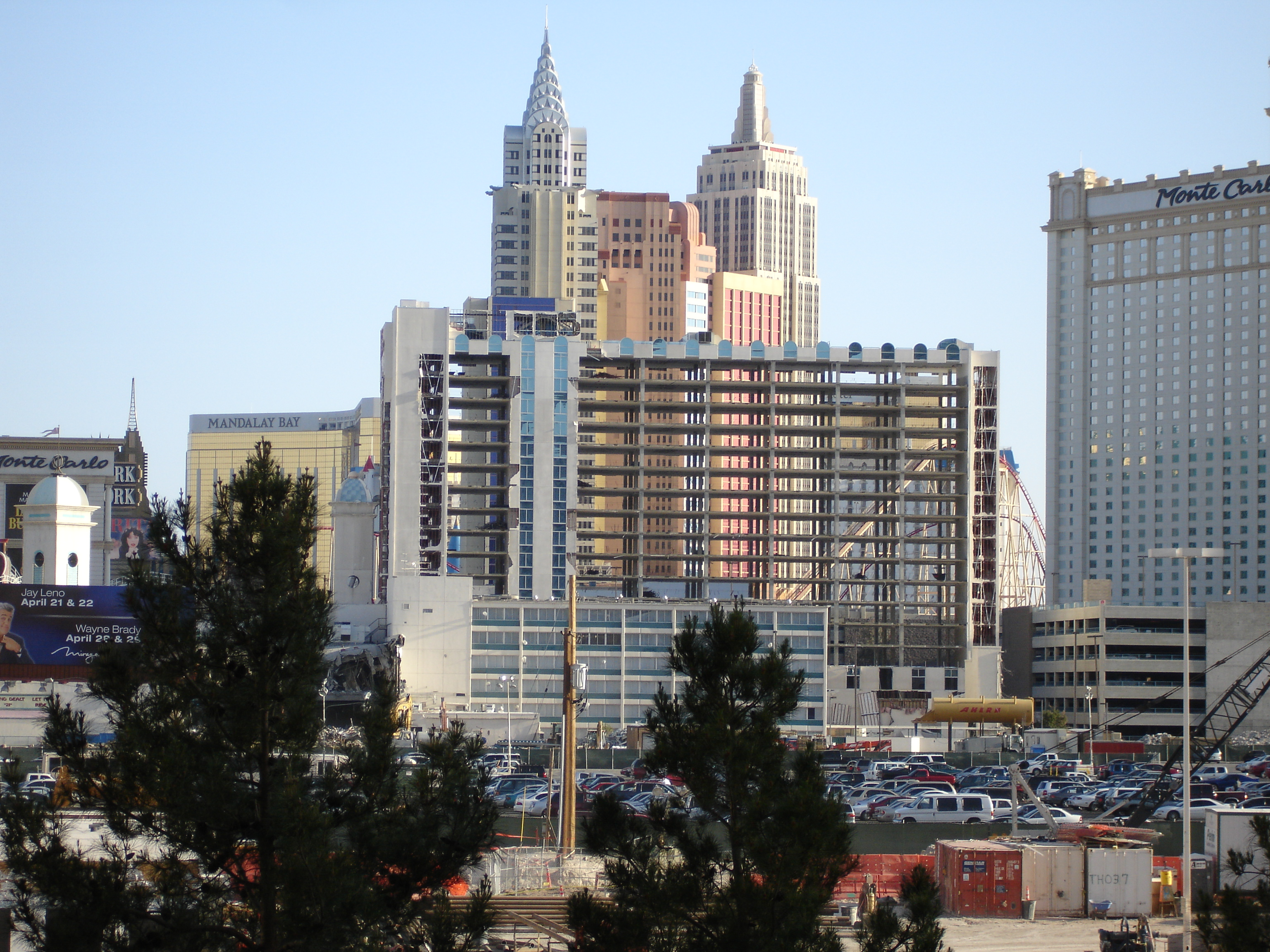
Demolition of the 15-story tower in April 2006, prior to implosion

The Boardwalk's main hotel tower was imploded by Controlled Demolition, Inc. on May 9, 2006. Much of the debris from the imploded structure was recycled as building material for CityCenter, including its foundation. Glass and bathroom fixtures were shipped to other countries for re-use. Former lieutenant governor Lonnie Hammargren, a collector of Las Vegas memorabilia, purchased the Boardwalk's Ferris wheel, a Surf Buffet sign, the resort's wedding gazebo, and a 15-foot-high lighthouse. The facade's clown head was demolished. The Boardwalk site is now occupied by CityCenter's Waldorf Astoria hotel.

== Notable entertainers ==
The Unknown Comic performed at the Boardwalk in the mid-1990s. Elvis impersonator Trent Carlini entertained in the casino's 100-seat Lighthouse Showroom from 1996 to 2001, sharing the venue at one point with magician Dixie Dooley. Purple Reign, a Prince tribute show, ran in the same venue from 2001 to 2006.
