= Panda Restaurant Group =

American restaurant company

Panda Restaurant Group, Inc.

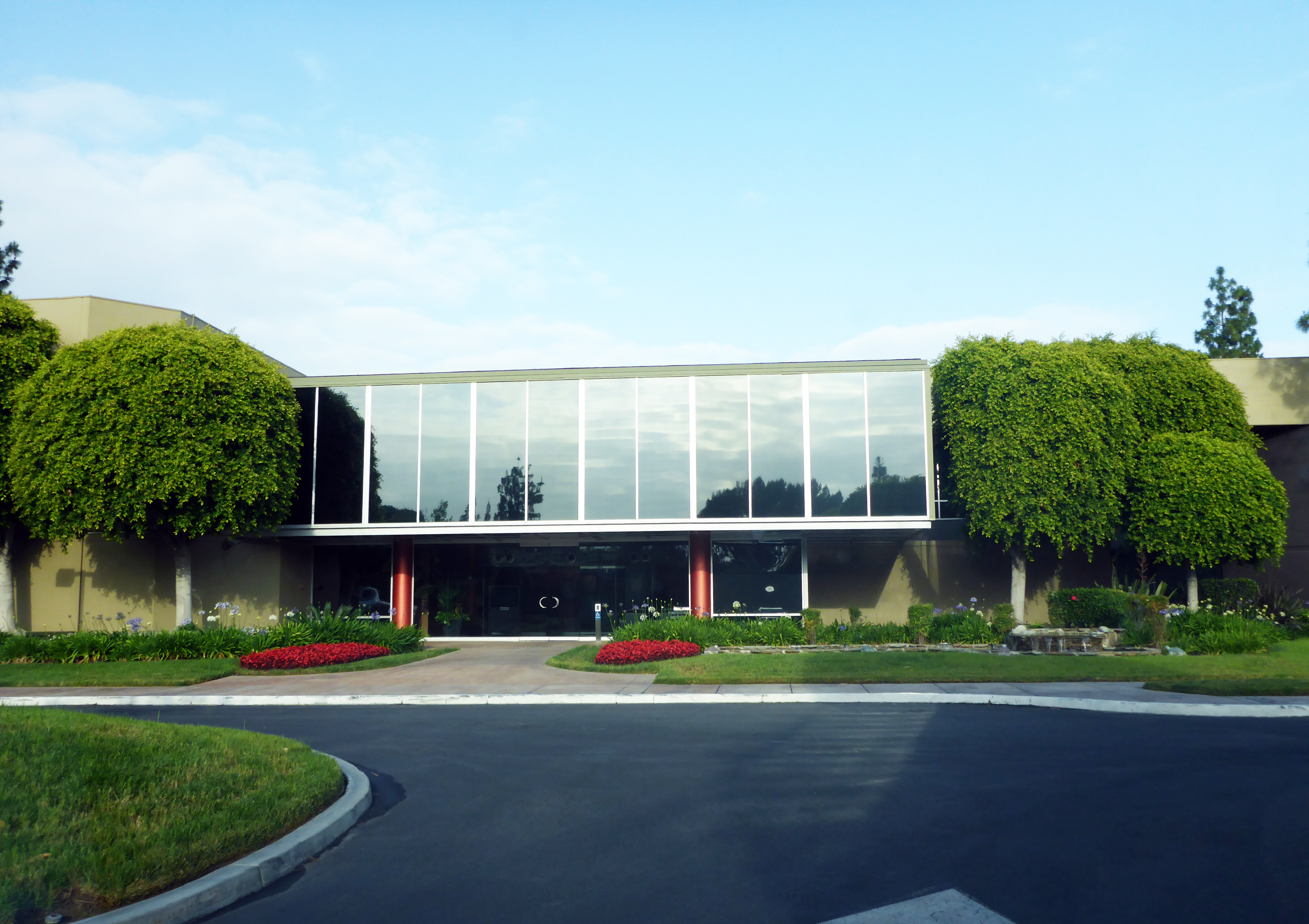
- Panda Restaurant Group headquarters
- Type: Private
- Genre: Chinese and Japanese restaurants
- Founded: 1973
- Founder: Andrew Cherng
- Headquarters: 1683 Walnut Grove Avenue, Rosemead, California, U.S.
- Number of locations: 2,300
- Area served: 43 U.S. states, Puerto Rico, Mexico, Canada, South Korea, Germany, Japan, Philippines
- Key people: Andrew Cherng, Chairman & Co-CEO; Peggy Cherng, Co-Chairman & Co-CEO; David Landsberg; CFO
- Revenue: $5.9 billion (2024)
- Owner: Cherng family
- Number of employees: 48,000
- Website: www.pandarg.com

Panda Express Logo

Panda Inn Logo

Panda Restaurant Group, Inc. is the parent company of Panda Inn, Panda Express and Hibachi-San. It was founded by Andrew and Peggy Tsiang Cherng and Andrew's father, Master Chef Ming-Tsai Cherng; the family originated from the Yangzhou region of China's Jiangsu province. They started their first Panda Inn restaurant in 1973 in Pasadena, California. Ten years later a developer of the new Glendale Galleria mall, a frequent patron of Panda Inn, asked Andrew to start a fast-service version of his restaurant in the new mall. In 1985 the store went from five locations to nine in just one year.

The group's headquarters is located in Rosemead, California. Panda Express is the largest Asian-American restaurant chain in the United States, with 2,200 branches. In 2019 Panda Express opened its first branch in Manila, Philippines, as a joint venture between the Panda Restaurant Group and Jollibee Foods Corp., JBPX Foods.

Andrew Cherng and his wife Peggy Tsiang Cherng met at Baker University in Baldwin City, Kansas. Peggy Cherng went on to receive her B.S. degree in Mathematics from Oregon State University in 1971 and a Ph.D. in Electrical Engineering from the University of Missouri. The company debuted on Forbes' 2016 edition of America's Largest Private Companies

The Cherngs invest their personal wealth out of their family office, the Cherng Family Trust.

== Companies ==
The Panda Restaurant Group includes Panda Express, Panda Inn, Raising Cane's Chicken Fingers (AK/HI only) and Hibachi-San.

Panda Express, the most popular, has over 2,200 locations as of 2025, making it the largest Chinese fast food chain in the United States.

Panda Inn, a sit-down restaurant chain, has 4 locations, all of which are in California, plus Wasabi, a Japanese concept.

Panda Group has been aggressively supporting popular Asian chains by introducing them in the American market. Uncle Tetsu, Yakiya, Pieology and Ippudo are all concepts supported by Panda Group.

In 2024 it was ranked 107 on the Forbes list of America's Largest Private Companies.

== Philanthropy ==
The majority of the Cherngs donations are done through Panda Cares, the giving arm of the Panda Group, and the Panda Charitable Foundation, to education, youth leadership development and health. Since 1999 Panda Cares has raised over $107 million.

In July 2017, the company pledged $10 million to the Children's Hospital Los Angeles, where the sixth floor will be renamed the Panda Express Floor.

In May 2022, The Huntington Hospital in Pasadena, California announced a $25 million gift from the Panda Charitable Family Foundation in support of enhancements to the hospital’s surgical care program. The Huntington Hospital announced they will be displaying the family's name on campus as a thank you to their commitment and continuous support of the hospital.

November 2022, the company pledged $5 million to create the “Panda Cares Center of Hope” within OHSU Doernbecher Children’s Hospital in Portland, Oregon. OHSU Doernbecher’s Panda Cares Center of Hope is housed in the South Acute Care Unit located on the 9th floor of Doernbecher, and expands services provided for acute patients.
