= Andrew Cherng =

Taiwanese-American restaurateur

- 程正昌
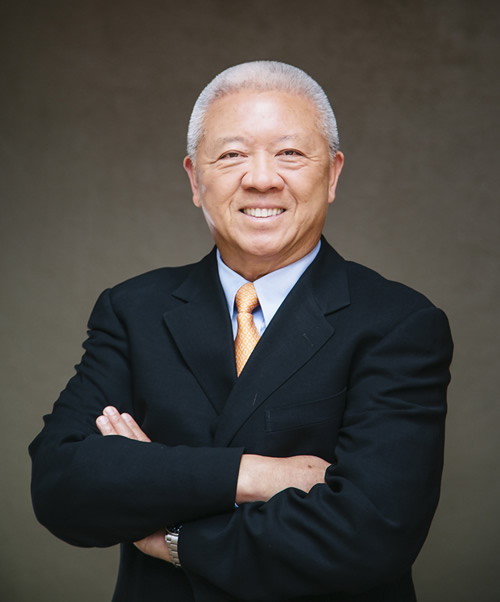
- Cherng in 2014
- Born: Jin Chang Cherng; April 1948 (age 78); Yangzhou, Jiangsu, Republic of China
- Citizenship: United States
- Education: Baker University (BS); University of Missouri (MS)
- Occupations: Entrepreneur; restaurateur; philanthropist
- Known for: Founder of the Panda Express restaurant chain
- Spouse: Peggy Tsiang (m. 1975)
- Children: 3
- Parent: Ming-Tsai Cherng (father)

Andrew Cherng
- Chinese: 程正昌
Transcriptions
Standard Mandarin
- Hanyu Pinyin: Chéng Zhèngchāng
- Gwoyeu Romatzyh: Cherng Jenqchang
- Wade–Giles: Ch'eng2 Cheng4-ch'ang1
- IPA: [ʈʂʰə̌ŋ ʈʂə̂ŋ.ʈʂʰáŋ]

Andrew Cherng (Chinese: 程正昌; pinyin: Chéng Zhèngchāng; pronounced /ˈtʃɜːrŋ/; born April 1948) is a Chinese-born Taiwanese-American restaurateur. He is the founder and chairman of Panda Restaurant Group, based in Rosemead, California. He is the co-founder and co-chief executive officer (co-CEO) of Panda Express. The Cherngs invest out of their family office, the Cherng Family Trust. As of February 2025, Forbes estimates his net worth to be US$4 billion, making him one of the wealthiest individuals in the world.

== Early life and education ==
Cherng was born in April 1948 in Yangzhou, Jiangsu Province, Republic of China on the northern bank of the Yangtze River. His father was Ming-Tsai Cherng, a chef.

He and his family moved to Taiwan after the Kuomintang was defeated on mainland China at the end of the Chinese Civil War, and in 1963, his family moved to Yokohama, Japan, where his father had taken a job as a chef.

In 1966, at age 18, he immigrated to the United States to study at an American university. He earned a bachelor's degree in mathematics in 1970 from Baker University in Baldwin City, Kansas, and a master's degree in applied mathematics from the University of Missouri in 1972. At Baker, he had met his future wife, Peggy Tsiang, born in Burma and raised in Hong Kong, who went on to earn a bachelor's degree in mathematics from Oregon State University in 1971 and a PhD in electrical engineering from the University of Missouri.

== Business career ==
In 1972, he moved to the Los Angeles area to help his cousin run a restaurant called Ting Ho. After a few months, he found a restaurant in Pasadena to take over.

In June 1973, along with his father Ming-Tsai Cherng, they took over a restaurant and started a new Chinese restaurant called Panda Inn in Pasadena, California on Foothill Boulevard, using funds from the family and a Small Business Administration loan. It opened on June 8, 1973. The cuisine was more general Chinese than the Cantonese usually found in the area.

In 1983, Andrew Cherng opened the first Panda Express, a fast food restaurant, at the newly opened Glendale Galleria II mall in Glendale, California. He had been prompted to start the spin off by the developer of the mall who had eaten at Panda Inn and invited Cherng to take a place at the food court.

The company had expanded to 100 restaurants by 1993, with the opening of an outlet at the University of California, Los Angeles.

Cherng has stated a preference for keeping the company closely held. However, in 2006 he told USA Today if the company could get a valuation close to that of Chipotle Mexican Grill, he might reconsider his stance. However, in an interview with The Seattle Times newspaper in 2008, he said he would not be interested in making the company public, saying they did not need the money and citing concerns with the trouble and expense of dealing with shareholders.

The Cherngs have since invested heavily in new restaurant concepts such as Just Salad, YakiYan, Ippudo, and Pieology.

In 2018, it was announced that the Cherng Family Trust purchased the former Mandarin Oriental hotel on the Las Vegas Strip and rebranded it as a Waldorf Astoria. The total acquisition price for the property was $214 million.

== Philanthropy ==
In February 2011, the Cherngs donated $2.5 million to support the Collins College of Hospitality Management at California State Polytechnic University, Pomona.

In March 2017, the California Institute of Technology announced that they were changing the name of its medical engineering department to the Andrew and Peggy Cherng Department of Medical Engineering after receiving a $30 million gift from Andrew and Peggy Cherng. In the following month, the University of Missouri announced receiving a $1.5 million gift from the Cherngs which would benefit its Honors College.

The Cherngs donated $100 million to City of Hope in 2023 to advance cancer care that integrates Eastern and Western healing methods. It was the "single largest gift for cancer care" received by the Duarte-based center.

In February 2025, the Cherngs donated $17 million through the Cherng Family Trust to St. Rose Dominican Hospital – Siena Campus in Henderson, Nevada. This contribution, the largest single gift in the hospital's 87‑year history, enabled the institution to acquire an 88,000‑square‑foot building originally constructed in 2000 and previously managed by a real estate investment trust. Renamed the Cherng Family Medical Building, the facility is set to house ancillary services and medical offices, as part of an expansion initiative aimed at enhancing cancer, trauma, and pediatric care services. This donation forms part of a broader philanthropic portfolio, with the Cherng family having contributed approximately $400 million to healthcare initiatives over several decades.

== Personal life ==
Cherng married Peggy Tsiang in 1975. They have three daughters. One of their daughters, Andrea, works for the Panda Restaurant Group as its Chief Brand Officer.

In 2015, it was reported that he and his wife had invested $15.2 million in a beachfront property and home in Honolulu. In 2018, the couple purchased a property in and relocated to Henderson, Nevada.

== Honors ==
- Since 2010, Cherng has been a member of the Committee of 100, an international, non-profit, non-partisan membership organization that brings a Chinese American perspective to issues concerning Asian Americans and U.S.-China relations.
- In 2022, Andrew and Peggy Cherng were inducted into the Asian Hall of Fame.
- In 2008, Cherng was listed in Forbes' Twenty-Five Notable Chinese-Americans.
- In 2008, California State Polytechnic University, Pomona conferred Cherng with an honorary doctorate.
- Andrew and Peggy Cherng were inducted into the National Restaurant Association Hall of Fame in 2005.
