= Panda Express =

American fast food restaurant chain

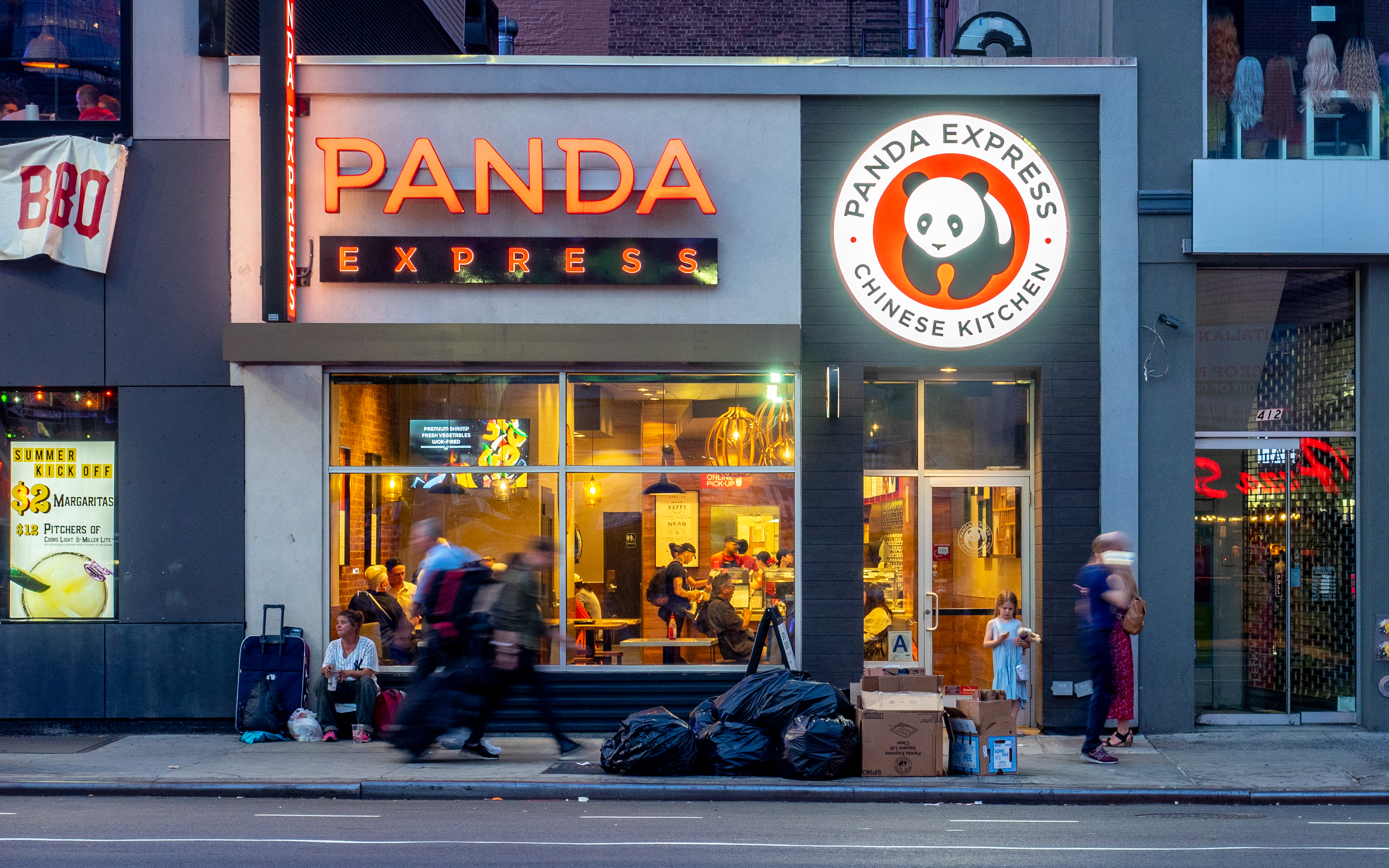
- Panda Express location, Midtown Manhattan
- Type: Subsidiary
- Industry: Food service
- Genre: American Chinese cuisine
- Founded: October 1983; 43 years ago in Glendale, California, U.S.
- Founders: Andrew Cherng; Peggy Cherng
- Headquarters: 1683 Walnut Grove Avenue; Rosemead, California, U.S.
- Number of locations: 2,600 (2026)
- Area served: United States (including Puerto Rico & Guam), Mexico, Canada, Saudi Arabia, South Korea, United Arab Emirates, Japan, Guatemala, El Salvador, Aruba, Philippines, Germany, Russia (formerly)
- Key people: Andrew Cherng and Peggy Cherng (Co-CEOs)
- Products: American Chinese cuisine
- Revenue: 6.205 billion (2024)
- Number of employees: 55,000 (2026)
- Parent: Panda Restaurant Group
- Website: pandaexpress.com

Panda Express is an American fast-food restaurant chain that specializes in American Chinese cuisine. With over 2,400 locations, it is the largest Asian-segment restaurant chain in the United States, and is mainly located in North America and Asia. Panda Express restaurants were initially limited to shopping mall food courts, and have since extended into other environments and formats, including stand-alone restaurants, as well as universities, casinos, airports, military bases, amusement parks and other venues.

The chain offers a variety of American-Chinese dishes, including orange chicken, sweet fire chicken breast, Beijing beef, grilled teriyaki chicken, and Kung Pao chicken, with certain premium dishes such as honey walnut shrimp and black pepper Angus steak having additional costs for the patron. The company is headquartered in Rosemead, California. The Panda Express brand is a casual, fast-food variation of corporate sibling Panda Inn, which is a chain of upscale, table-service restaurants.

== History ==
The Panda Restaurant Group, parent company of Panda Inn, Panda Express, and Hibachi-San, was founded by Andrew Cherng, Peggy Cherng and Andrew's father, Master Chef Ming Tsai Cherng. Andrew Cherng and his father are Chinese born, while Peggy was born in Burma and raised in Hong Kong. Both Andrew and Peggy Cherng are alumni of Baker University in Baldwin City, Kansas (where they first met).

Andrew went into business with his father in the United States in 1973, opening their first Panda Inn restaurant in Pasadena, California. At the beginning, business was lacking to the degree that Andrew had to offer special deals and freebies so that customers would dine at Panda Inn. In 1982, Peggy joined Andrew in the restaurant business. While operating Panda Inn, Andrew became acquainted with then-UCLA head football coach Terry Donahue, as well as Terry's brother Dan, who happened to be in the real estate business. It was because of this connection that in 1983, Donahue Schriber Real Estate, the manager of the Glendale Galleria, invited the Cherngs to develop a fast-food version of Panda Inn for the Galleria's food court, and Panda Express was launched that October. A second location was opened two years later at the Westside Pavilion in 1985. The chain has steadily expanded across the United States since then. Chef Andy Kao claims to have developed the original Chinese-American orange chicken recipe at a Panda Express in Hawaii in 1987.

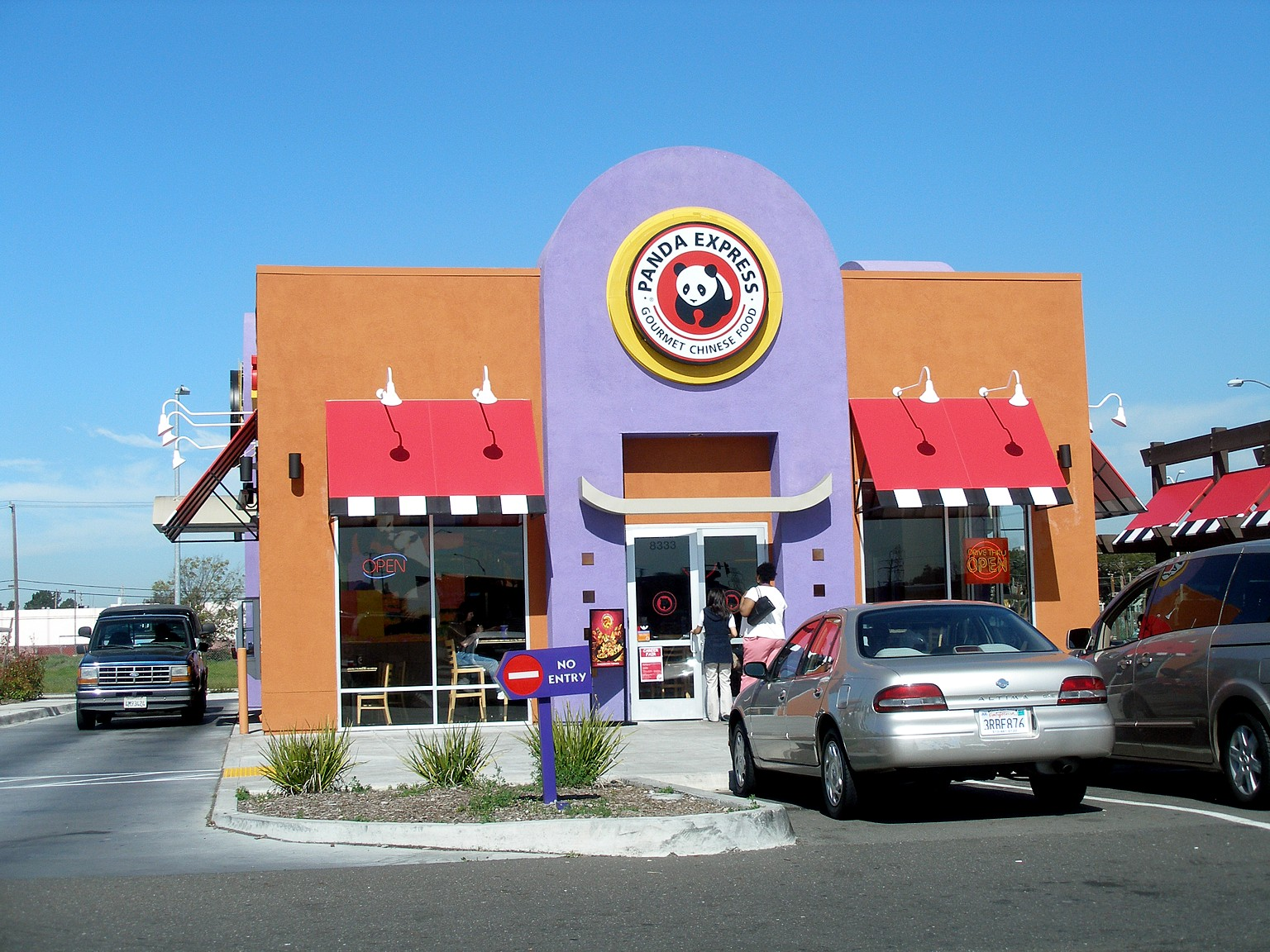
A stand-alone Panda Express restaurant in Oakland, California with drive-through window

At first, Panda Express restaurants were found solely in food courts in major shopping malls. During the late 1980s and early 1990s, the Cherngs began experimenting with supermarket-based branches, through a deal with Vons, and then stand-alone restaurant locations. In 1997, the company opened its first stand-alone, drive-through restaurant, in Hesperia, California. Today less than 2% of its restaurants are in malls.

In the late 2000s, the Cherngs began implementing play areas, known as the Panda Express Play Places, which had been developed in the late 90's by their business partner, Reginald Schwaab. The Play Places were a major success, primarily on the East Coast of America, where the chain continued to succeed. Due to COVID and increased costs regarding upkeep, the play places were removed from the chain in August 2020.

Because Peggy had worked for several years as a software designer and engineer for defense contractors like McDonnell Douglas, Panda Express computerized its operations early on. Peggy also brought a systems analysis perspective to the business and worked through the logistics and standardization issues necessary to scale up the concept.

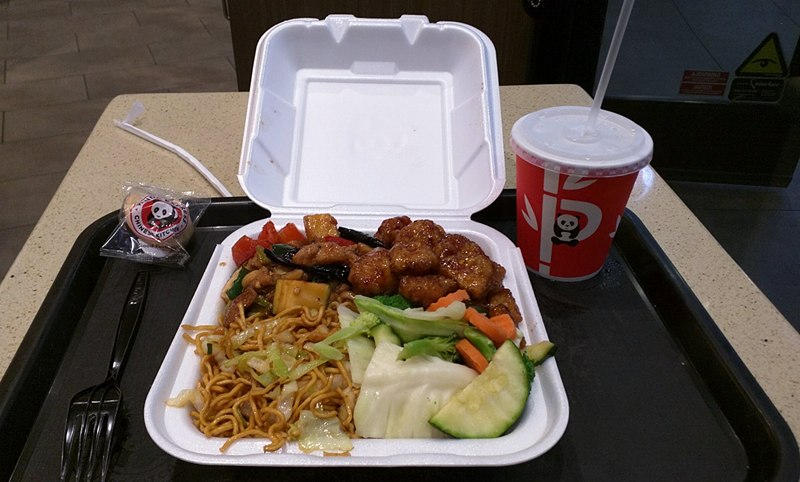
A typical Panda Express meal: Kung Pao chicken, orange chicken, chow mein and steamed vegetables

In 2005, Panda Express began to open units in food courts on college campuses, some of which participate in the residential student meal plans. In 2008, the Cherngs were the recipients of the City of Angels Award, given by the LAX Coastal Area Chamber of Commerce, for their contributions to the greater Los Angeles area. As of 2007, the company's highest revenue location, bringing in over US$4 million annually, was located at the Ala Moana Center food court in Honolulu, Hawaii.

On the ABC News TV program Nightline, April 18, 2011, there was a feature segment on Panda Express and its success that described how Andrew Cherng encourages his workers and management to go through self-help programs emphasizing Landmark Education.

In 2011, a suit was filed by the Equal Employment Opportunity Commission against Panda Express because it was reportedly treating its Hispanic employees differently than Asian employees. In June 2013, it was announced that the restaurant chain will pay $150,000 to settle another EEOC action on behalf of at least three female teenagers who were allegedly sexually harassed between 2007 and 2009 by one male kitchen supervisor in Kauai, Hawaii. In addition to the fines, Panda Express revised its policies and was required to provide anti-discrimination and sexual harassment training for employees.

Later that year, Panda Express opened its first location in the western Pacific, opening a location in Guam. The first location in the state of Alaska was later opened in December 2015.

As of 2017, the Panda Restaurant Group had annual sales of over $3 billion and close to 39,000 employees. The Cherngs also opened Panda Innovation Kitchen in Pasadena with their daughter, Andrea Cherng, overlooking a majority of the restaurant's business. The idea for Panda Innovation Kitchen is to experiment with new flavours and ingredients to come up with new menu items. In addition, they also opened a tea bar to introduce Taiwanese drinks such as boba milk tea and new drinks like the Fortune Cookie Shake.

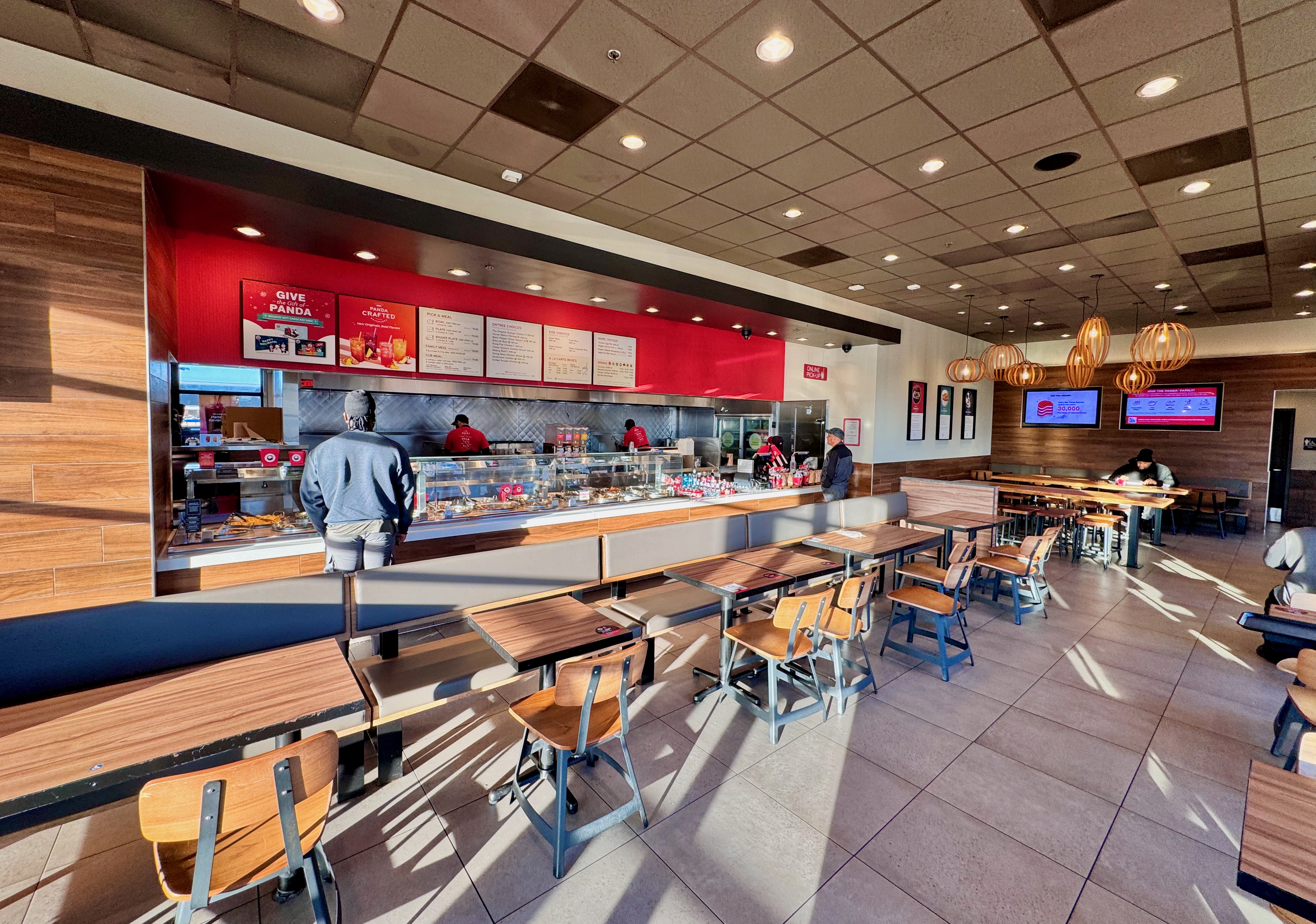
Interior of a typical stand-alone Panda Express

In December 2017, Panda Express had opened the chain's 2,000th location, which is located in New York City near Columbia University.

In February 2022, Panda Restaurant Group filed a U.S. trademark application for the name PANDAVERSE for "downloadable virtual goods, namely, food items and beverages for use in virtual worlds" and "virtual food and beverage products." The filing marked an intention to expand the Panda Express brand into the Metaverse.

In March 2022, Panda Express committed to transitioning to 100% cage-free eggs, responding to pressure from animal welfare groups.

== International ==
Logo used from 1983 to 2009

Panda Express also operates in Aruba, Canada, El Salvador, Guatemala, Japan, Mexico, the Philippines, Saudi Arabia, South Korea, and the United Arab Emirates. The first location in Mexico opened in Mexico City in September 2011.

In October 2013, the first Panda Express located in Canada opened on Hunt Club Road in Nepean, Ontario, but has since closed. The first location in Calgary was opened in October 2016.

On May 26, 2014, it was reported by Arabian Business news that Panda Express would be opening a restaurant in the United Arab Emirates. The first Panda Express restaurant in the Middle East was opened in Dubai in November 2014.

The first location in South Korea was opened in Seoul in September 2014 as a joint venture with Seoul-based SF Innovation Co.

In July 2016, Panda Express opened its first location in Guatemala, in Guatemala City.

In September 2017, Panda Express opened its first location on the Dutch Caribbean country of Aruba at the Queen Beatrix International Airport.

Although it is unknown when Panda Express opened its first restaurant in Saudi Arabia, a second Panda Express in Saudi Arabia opened in Riyadh in January 2018. Both Saudi Arabian restaurants, as well as the ones in United Arab Emirates are operated by Gourmet Gulf.

In July 2018, Panda Express entered El Salvador for the first time by opening two locations in the capital city of San Salvador.

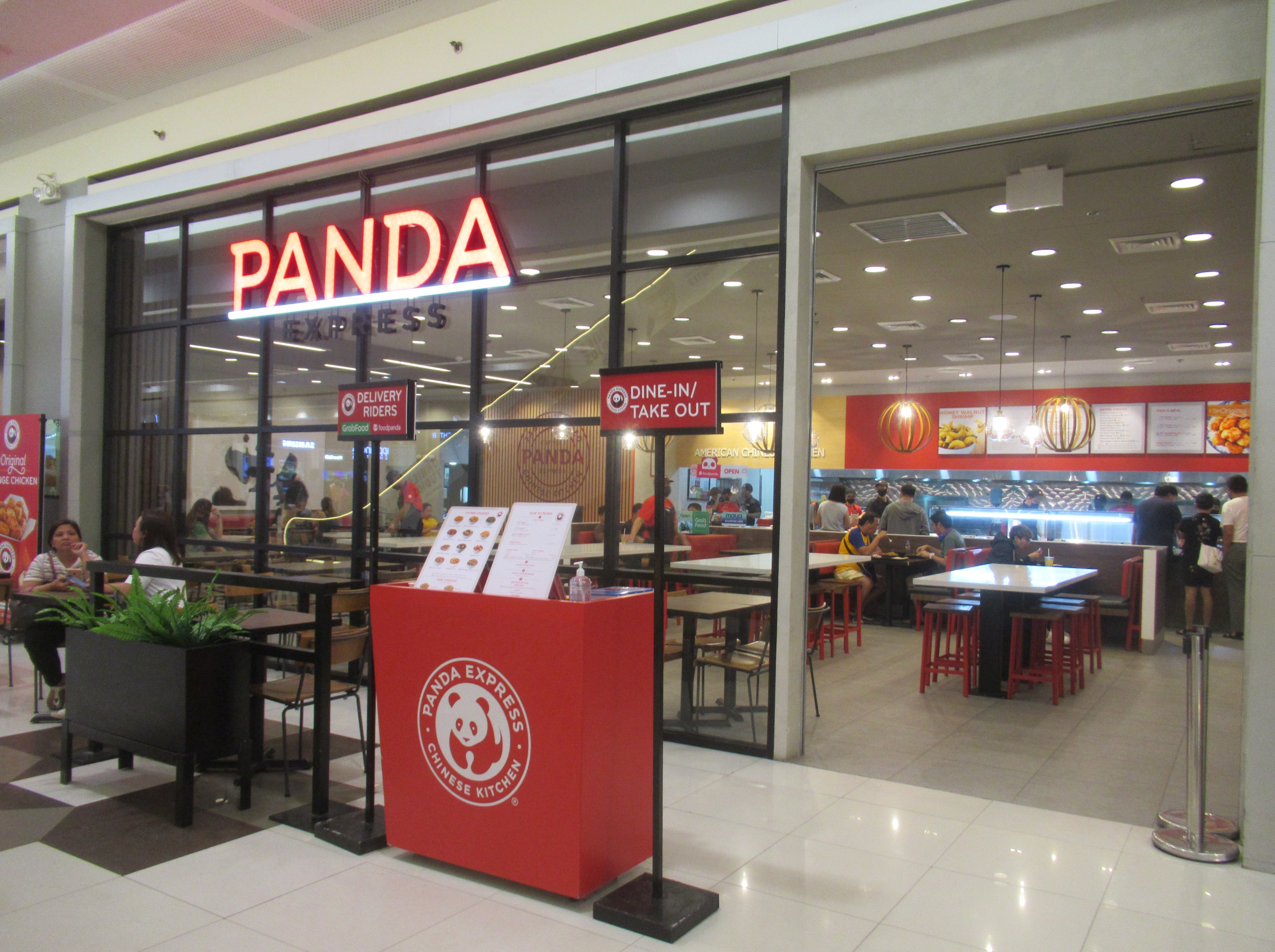
A Panda Express outlet at SM City Pampanga in San Fernando, Pampanga, Philippines

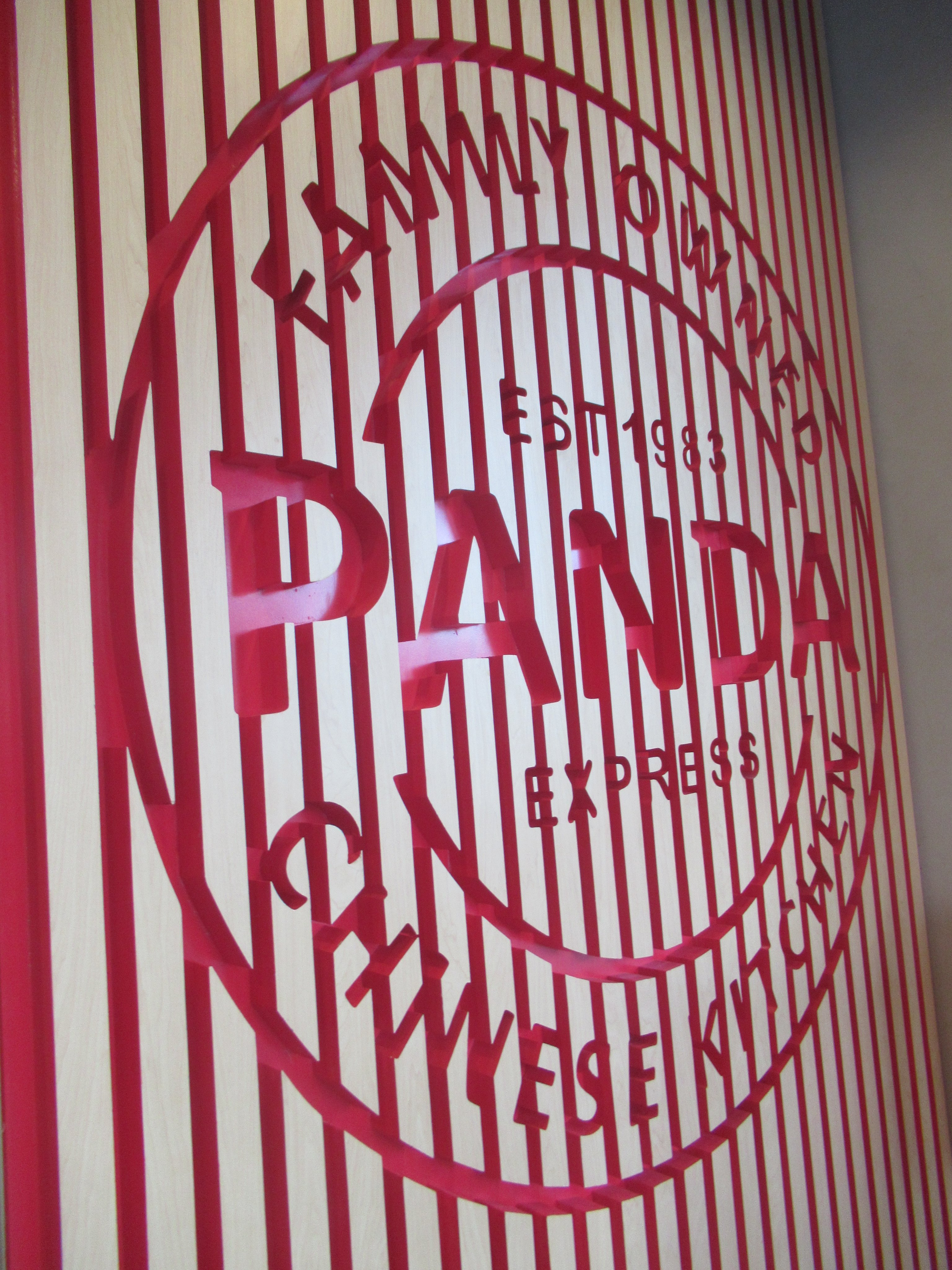
Drive-through sign

In September 2018, Panda Express announced its joint venture with Jollibee Foods Corporation to bring its stores in the Philippines. A year later, in December 2019, the first Panda Express restaurant in the Philippines opened at SM Megamall in Mandaluyong. More branches were opened, all located in the Greater Manila Area.

The first Panda Express in Russia opened in Moscow in September 2018. However, in March 2022, Panda Express ceased all corporate support, including operations, marketing, and supply chain in response to the Russian war against Ukraine.

Panda Express previously had eight sites in Japan that were operated under a franchise agreement that later lapsed. In November 2016, the company returned to the country by opening a new restaurant in Kawasaki. This restaurant is operated as part of a joint partnership with Ippudo. As of August 2022, there were nine restaurants in the country.

In October 2020, the South China Morning Post reported that a fake Panda Express restaurant in the southwestern Chinese city of Kunming had been reported for trademark infringement, and was closed during an investigation. The reportedly fake restaurant used the same Panda Express logo, and its menu reportedly included the same Kung Pao Chicken and Tangerine Peel Chicken as the company's restaurants.

In August 2022, Panda Express opened its first European site in Kaiserslautern Military Community Center food court, Ramstein Air Base, Germany. The first German public location will open at the train station Zoologischer Garten in Berlin.

== Philanthropy ==
In 1999, Panda Express launched Panda Cares to "give back to the community". They provide funding, food, and volunteer services to children in need and disaster relief efforts. The company installed donation boxes in all the Panda Express restaurants in 2010. The charity has raised $107 million, with $89 million coming from in-store donation boxes, and $41 million has been donated to "The Leader In Me", a program to teach leadership and life skills rolled out to 865 elementary schools in 39 states. The organization has also donated $37 million to Children's Miracle Network Hospitals, to support medical costs for poor children and disaster relief efforts.

== See also ==
- List of Chinese restaurants
- PF Chang's
