= Peggy Cherng =

American businesswoman (born 1947/48)

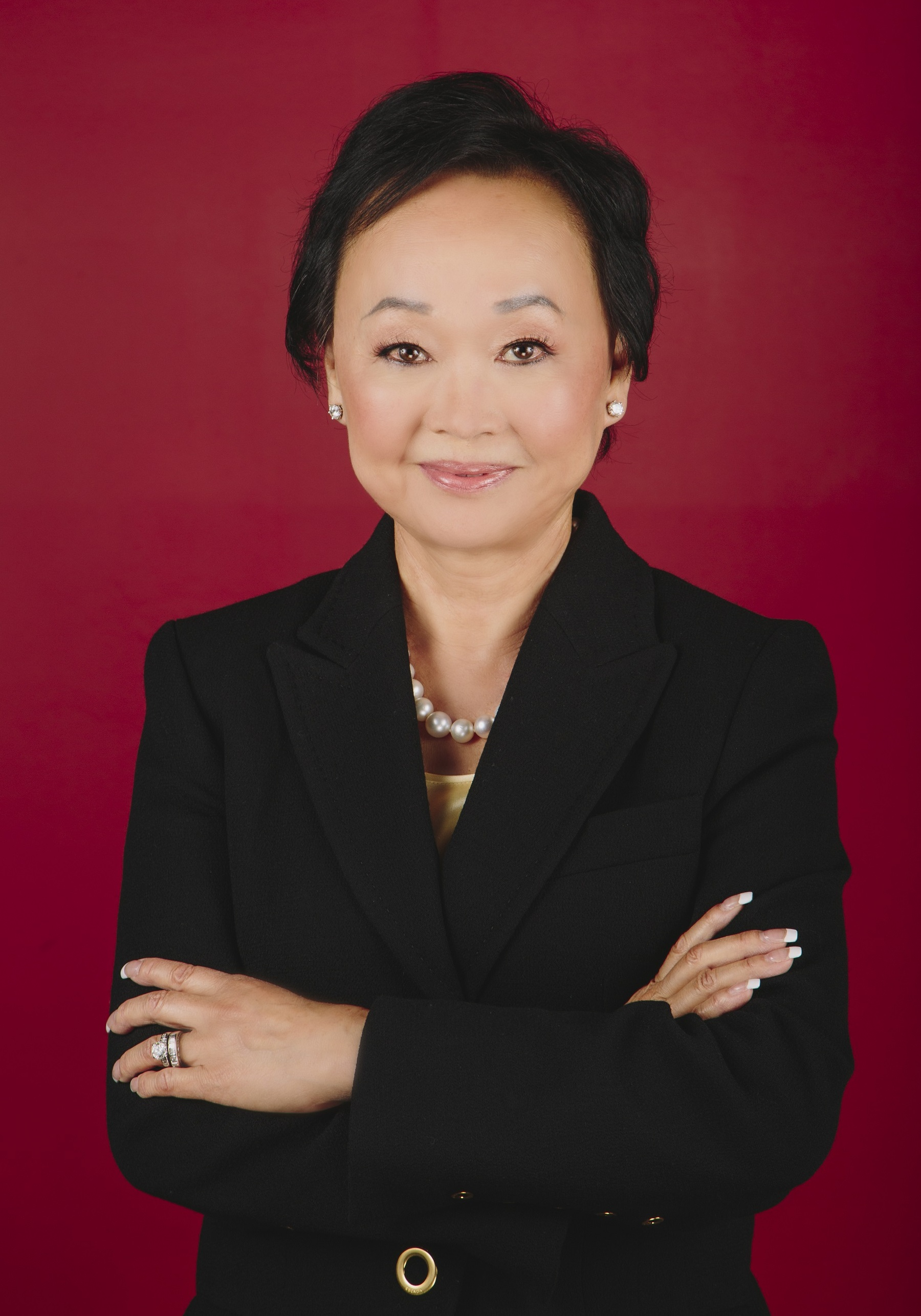
- Cherng in 2014
- Born: 1947 or 1948 (age 78–79); Mawlamyine, British Burma (now Myanmar)
- Education: Oregon State University (BS); University of Missouri (MS, PhD)
- Occupations: Entrepreneur, restaurateur, philanthropist
- Known for: Cofounder, Panda Express restaurant chain
- Spouse: Andrew Cherng (m. 1975)
- Children: 3
- Scientific career
- Fields: Computer science
- Workplaces: McDonnell Douglas; Comtal Corporation
- Thesis: Computer analysis of chest radiographs using size and shape descriptors (1974)

Peggy Tsiang Cherng (pronounced /ˈtʃɜːrŋ/, born 1947/1948) is an American businesswoman and computer scientist who co-founded Panda Express in 1983 and is the co-chief executive officer of Panda Restaurant Group. With an estimated net worth of US$3.7 billion as of October 2024, Forbes reported that she is America's second richest self-made woman born outside the US and one of the 400 wealthiest individuals in the world. The Cherngs invest their wealth out of their family office, the Cherng Family Trust.

== Early life and education ==
Peggy Tsiang was born in Mawlamyine, Myanmar, and grew up in Hong Kong. She attended Hong Kong's Clementi Secondary School and graduated in 1966. She went to the United States to attend Baker University in Baldwin City, Kansas, where as a freshman she met her future husband, Andrew Cherng, then a sophomore. She transferred a year later to Oregon State University, where she earned a bachelor's degree in applied mathematics in 1970. She then attended the University of Missouri, earning a master's in computer science in 1971, and a PhD in electrical engineering in 1974. She worked toward her PhD by developing a pattern-recognition program that digitized X-rays and applied algorithms to diagnose congenital heart disease. After earning her PhD, she and Andrew moved to Los Angeles where they married.

== Early career ==
From 1975 to 1977, Cherng was an engineering specialist at McDonnell Douglas, where she coded battlefield simulators for the US Air Force. From 1977 to 1982, she was a technical engineer and software department manager at Comtal Corporation, a subsidiary of 3M.

== Panda Restaurant Group ==
In June 1973, Andrew Cherng and his father, Ming Tsai Cherng, took over a restaurant and started a new Chinese restaurant called Panda Inn in Pasadena, California, using funds from the family and a Small Business Administration loan. In 1982, Peggy Cherng left Comtal and became Operations Manager at the Panda Restaurant Group. In 1982, she built the restaurant company's computer systems to track customer feedback and streamline operations. She used computers to track inventory and re-order ingredients.

In 1983, the Cherngs opened the first Panda Express, a fast food restaurant, at the newly opened Glendale Galleria II mall in Glendale, California. Peggy Cherng took over as president in 1997. She was the CEO and president of Panda Restaurant Group from 1997 until 2003, and in 2004 she became co-chair and co-CEO of Panda Restaurant Group. Panda Restaurant Group bought stakes in other restaurant franchises such as Urbane Cafe, Just Salad, Uncle Tetsu, Pieology and Ippudo. Drawing on her engineering background, Cherng developed sales-tracking and analytics systems for Panda Express to standardize recipes and operations across all restaurant locations.

The Cherngs have not franchised Panda Express, with limited exceptions, still owning and operating all of their restaurants without going public.

Cherng was #12 on America's Self-Made Women list for 2019 by Forbes. In October 2019, her development company CFT NV Developments LLC purchased land in Hawaii for $10 million. She and her husband are the Hawaii master franchisees for Raising Cane's Chicken Fingers. She is on the boards of the Los Angeles branch of the Federal Reserve Bank of San Francisco, the United Way of Los Angeles, Methodist Hospital of Arcadia and the Peter F. Drucker School of Management.

As of 2026, Peggy Cherng still serves as co-CEO of Panda Express, with approximately 2,600 operating locations. Her and her husband's net worth is estimated at $6.6 billion.

== Philanthropy ==
Through Panda Cares, the Panda Restaurant Group’s philanthropic branch, Peggy and Andrew Cherng have been regular donors in support of health care, education for underserved kids, medical and academic research, disaster relief and other charitable causes.

In February 2011, the Cherngs donated $2.5 million to support the Collins College of Hospitality Management at California State Polytechnic University, Pomona.

In March 2017, the California Institute of Technology announced that they were changing the name of its medical engineering department to the Andrew and Peggy Cherng Department of Medical Engineering after receiving a $30 million gift from Andrew and Peggy Cherng. In the following month, the University of Missouri announced receiving a $1.5 million gift from the Cherngs which would benefit its Honors College.

The Cherngs donated $100 million to City of Hope in 2023 to advance cancer care that integrates Eastern and Western healing methods. It was the "single largest gift for cancer care" received by the Duarte-based center. In February 2025, the Cherngs donated $17 million to St. Rose Dominican Hospital's Siena Campus in Henderson, NV. According to hospital officials, it was the largest gift in the institution's 78-year history.

== Personal life ==
Chergn and her husband, Andrew, have three daughters, all of whom are involved in the family's business, investments or charitable works. Through the Cherng Family Trust, they purchased the former Mandarin Oriental hotel on the Las Vegas Strip for $214 million in 2019 and rebranded it as the Waldorf Astoria. As of November 2019, the Cherngs reside in Henderson, Nevada.
