= The Harmon =

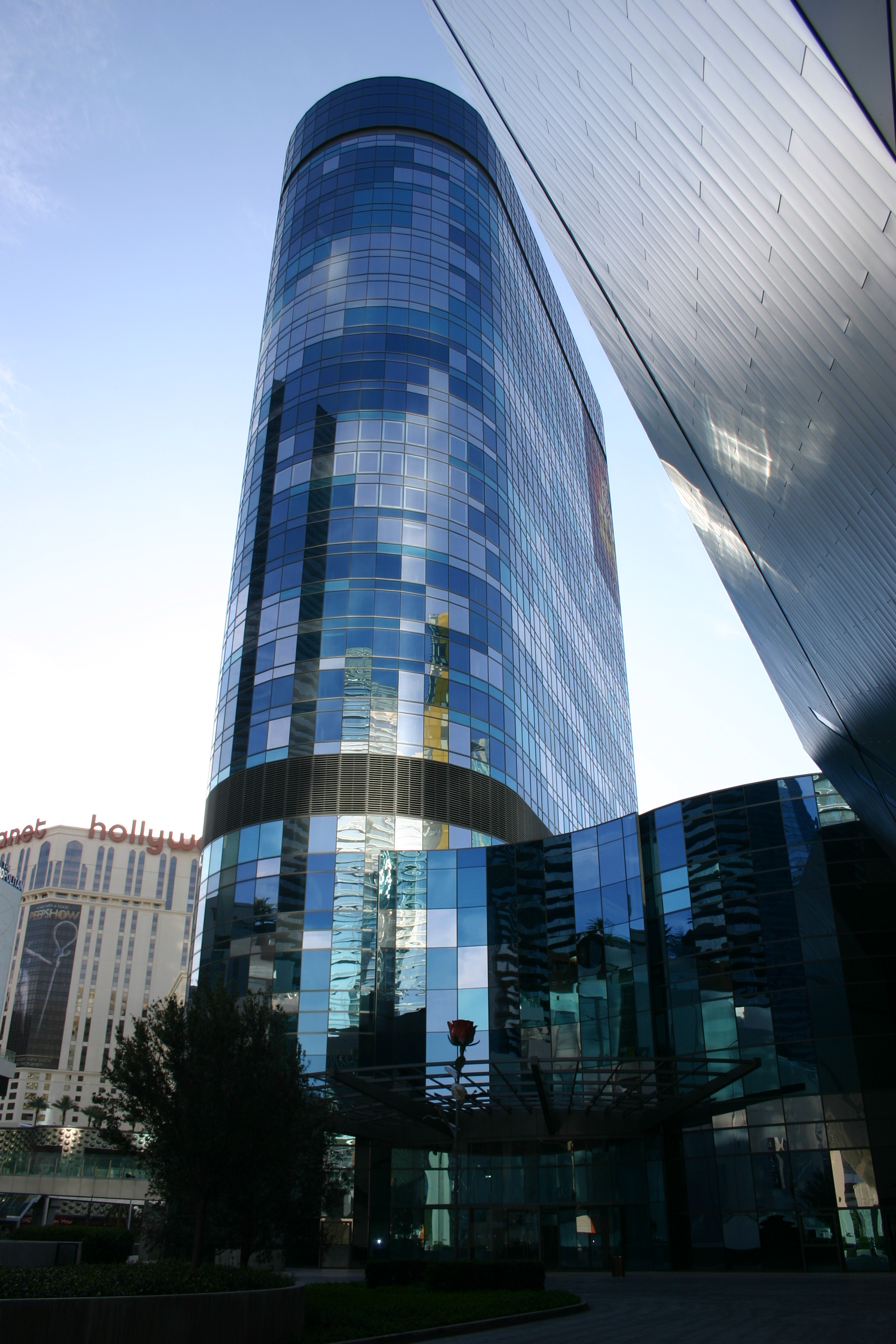
- The Harmon's main entrance in 2011, located at the west end of the property
- Interactive map of the The Harmon area
- Alternative names: The Harmon Hotel & Residences

General information
- Status: Demolished
- Type: Hotel and condominium tower
- Location: Las Vegas, Nevada 89109; United States, Corner of Harmon Avenue and Las Vegas Boulevard
- Coordinates: 36.108681°N 115.173611°W
- Construction started: 2007
- Completed: 2009 (exterior)
- Opened: Never
- Demolished: 2014–15
- Owner: MGM Mirage; Dubai World

Technical details
- Floor count: 28

Design and construction
- Architecture firm: Foster and Partners
- Main contractor: Perini Building Company

Other information
- Number of units: 400 rooms and 207 condominiums

The Harmon was an unfinished high-rise building at the CityCenter development, located on the Las Vegas Strip in Paradise, Nevada. It was named after its location at the intersection of Harmon Avenue and Las Vegas Boulevard. The Harmon was developed by MGM Mirage and Dubai World, with Perini Building Company as general contractor. It was designed by Foster and Partners as a non-gaming hotel, and was to be operated by The Light Group. It was scheduled to open with the rest of CityCenter in late 2009. The tower originally was to rise 49 stories, and would include 400 hotel rooms and 207 condominiums.

The Harmon had significant construction defects that went unnoticed by inspectors until July 2008, with the discovery of faulty rebar installation that was handled by a subcontractor. The tower had reached the 22nd floor by that point, with structural errors affecting 15 floors. In January 2009, MGM announced cancellation of the condominium component due to the costly structural defects, as well as the poor state of the local condo market. The tower was topped out at 28 stories, and its exterior was finished to blend in with CityCenter's other properties upon their debut. The Harmon itself was rescheduled to open a year later, at the end of 2010.

MGM, however, removed Perini from the project in March 2010, calling the hotel a "total loss". Perini filed a lawsuit seeking $492 million in unpaid construction bills, relating primarily to the Harmon. MGM filed a counterclaim, and the company's demolition plans were delayed as Perini considered the structure to be evidence of defective design, which would exonerate the general contractor. The lawsuit carried on for years before both sides settled in December 2014, avoiding trial.

The structure was largely an empty shell; during its existence, the exterior was used to advertise other CityCenter attractions. Testing of the structure, conducted during litigation, showed that it was vulnerable to collapsing in the event of an earthquake. Demolition eventually began in June 2014, and concluded in August 2015. The land was sold in 2021, and a four-story shopping mall, known as 63, opened on the site in 2023.

== History ==
=== Background ===
The Harmon was planned as a non-gaming hotel and condominium high-rise, with 400 rooms and 207 condo units. It was designed by Foster and Partners, and was built on the Las Vegas Strip at the intersection of Harmon Avenue. The Harmon, planned as part of the CityCenter project by MGM Mirage and Dubai World, was announced in October 2006. Condo sales opened in January 2008, and the Harmon was scheduled to open in late 2009, with the rest of CityCenter.

The Harmon would be managed by The Light Group, which operated restaurants and nightclubs at several MGM properties in Las Vegas. The Harmon would be the company's first hotel venture, and would target a young and wealthy clientele. Andrew Sasson, the chief of the Light Group, described it as a private "sanctuary" for celebrities seeking to avoid paparazzi. The hotel would be closed off except to guests and registered visitors, and the main entrance would be at the rear of the property, away from the Strip. The Harmon would offer services typically offered to high rollers, including personal shoppers and airport pickup and drop-off. Other features would include a Mr Chow restaurant and a salon by Frédéric Fekkai.

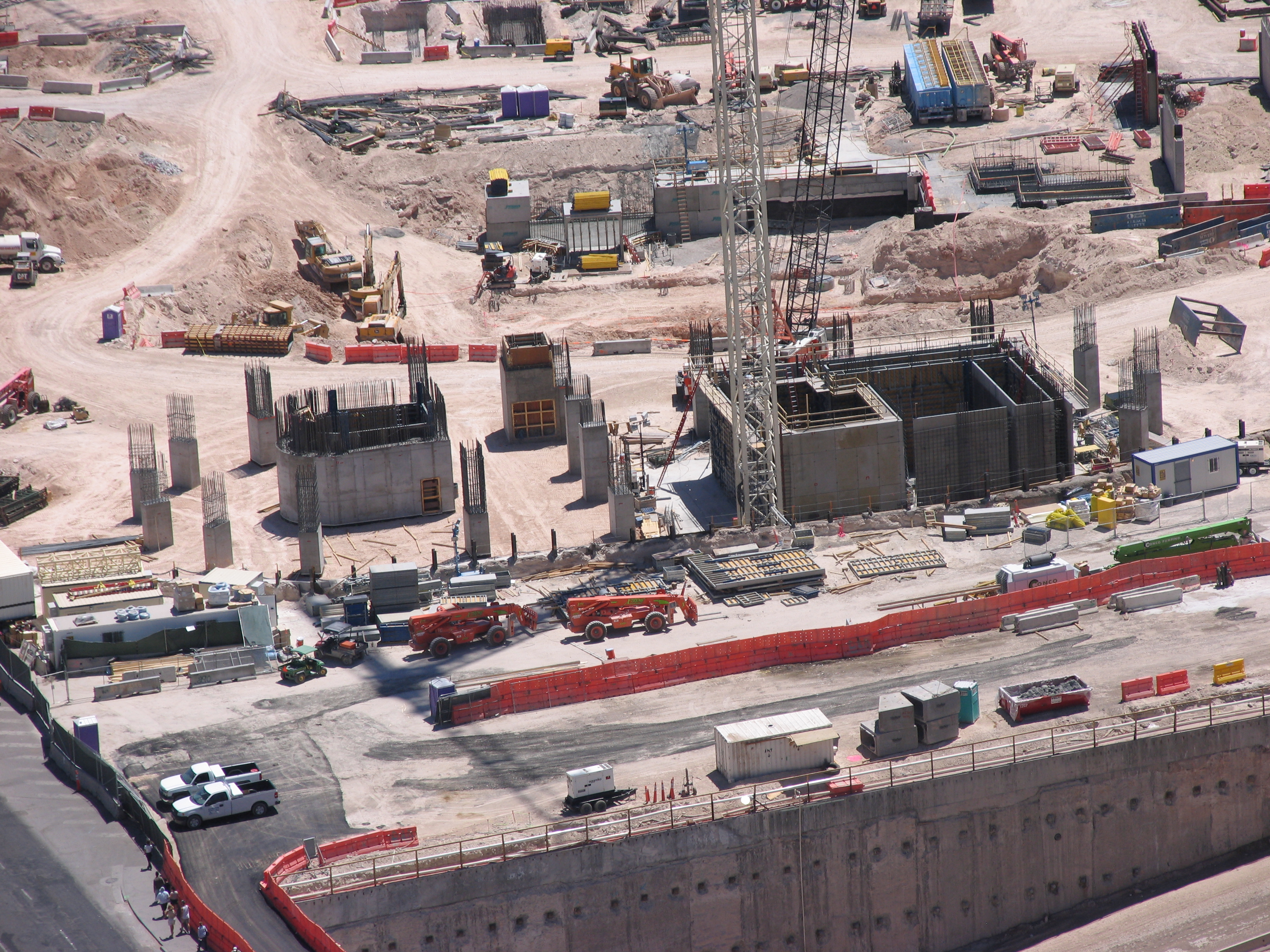
Harmon construction site in mid-2007

The Harmon occupied 2.5 acres (1.0 ha). The hotel tower was built on a three-story "podium" structure, with a footprint larger than the tower. Perini Building Company served as the general contractor for CityCenter, including the Harmon. Pacific Coast Steel was a subcontractor on the Harmon, providing steel rebar for the project, while Halcrow Yolles served as structural engineer.

In Clark County, Nevada, where the Harmon was built, developers are responsible for hiring third-party building inspectors to monitor construction projects. At the time, the county also had approximately one dozen special inspectors responsible for occasionally checking on third-party inspectors. Converse Consultants was hired as the third-party inspector for the Harmon.

=== Structural problems and initial effects ===
In July 2008, a Halcrow Yolles employee discovered structural flaws in the hotel's steel rebar, which was found to have been placed in different locations than previously planned, affecting 15 of the 22 existing floors. The errors occurred on floors 6 through 20. Most of the faulty rebar had already been buried in concrete. By September 2008, Perini was in the process of performing corrective work to the structure, which slowed progress on the project.

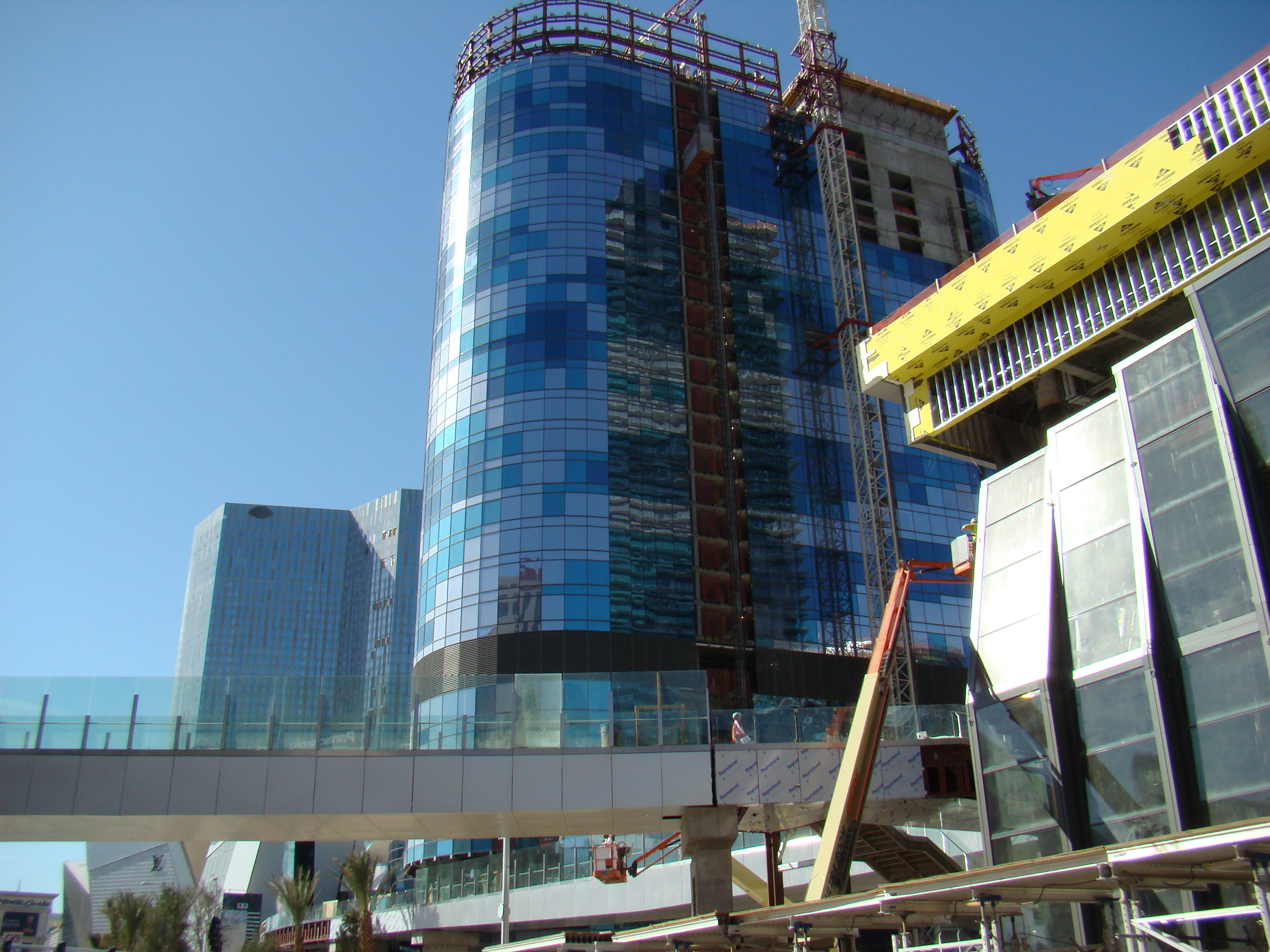
The Harmon as it nears exterior completion, October 2009

In January 2009, MGM announced that it had canceled the condominium aspect of the project due to the structural defects, which would require further costly repair work to accommodate additional floors. The tower, originally meant to rise 49 stories, was instead topped out at 28. The local condo market had also cooled down amid the Great Recession, another factor in removing units at the Harmon. MGM saved approximately $200 million by eliminating the condos, nearly half of which had been sold; buyers received refunds on their deposits.

The Harmon's opening was delayed to late 2010. Work on the hotel had restarted by June 2009, following county approval of redesign plans. The exterior was completed to blend in with CityCenter's other properties upon their opening in December 2009.

Ron Lynn, chief of the Clark County Building Division, blamed the structural errors on an apparent breakdown in the inspection process. According to Lynn, "In some cases the number of rebar was wrong and in some places it was in the wrong place. They were inconsistent in their errors. We don't understand how that inconsistency could have been missed or why it was done." Converse Consultants had repeatedly filed inspection reports indicating no issues with the rebar. There was no record of county inspectors visiting the construction site, to which Lynn said, "It doesn't appear they were doing oversight at the level we would have liked." The county subsequently required its monitors to physically observe construction work at the CityCenter site. The county also increased its number of CityCenter monitors from two to four.

In early 2009, Perini disputed a county claim that its construction work led to the structural errors, blaming the issue on design problems. The company stated that it "stands by its opinion that design conflicts contributed to the Harmon Hotel structural issues and that portions of the structural drawings, as designed and permitted, contained elements of reinforcing steel that could not be installed as drawn". Perini also stated that Pacific Coast Steel and Converse attempted to resolve the design problems by "modifying the placement of the reinforcing steel, as it was installed". Clark County filed complaints against Perini and Pacific Coast Steel; the latter reached a settlement in April 2009 and agreed to pay $14,105 in administrative fees to the Nevada Contractors Board, without admitting fault in the case.

The county also appointed hearing officer Charles Thomas to investigate the structural errors. Converse blamed a communication breakdown for the errors, but could not pinpoint when it occurred, noting the various parties involved in the project, including MGM, Perini, Pacific Coast Steel, and Halcrow Yolles. Thomas concluded that there was sufficient evidence showing that Converse's two inspectors on the project had falsified 62 daily reports, from March to July 2008, assuring that proper rebar installation was observed.

Converse was suspended from working on any new projects for six months. One of its inspectors on the project had left the company as of July 2009, while the other was demoted. One of them had little experience in building inspections. The Harmon case highlighted the fact that Clark County does not verify inspector résumés, posing the potential for falsified qualifications.

=== Litigation ===
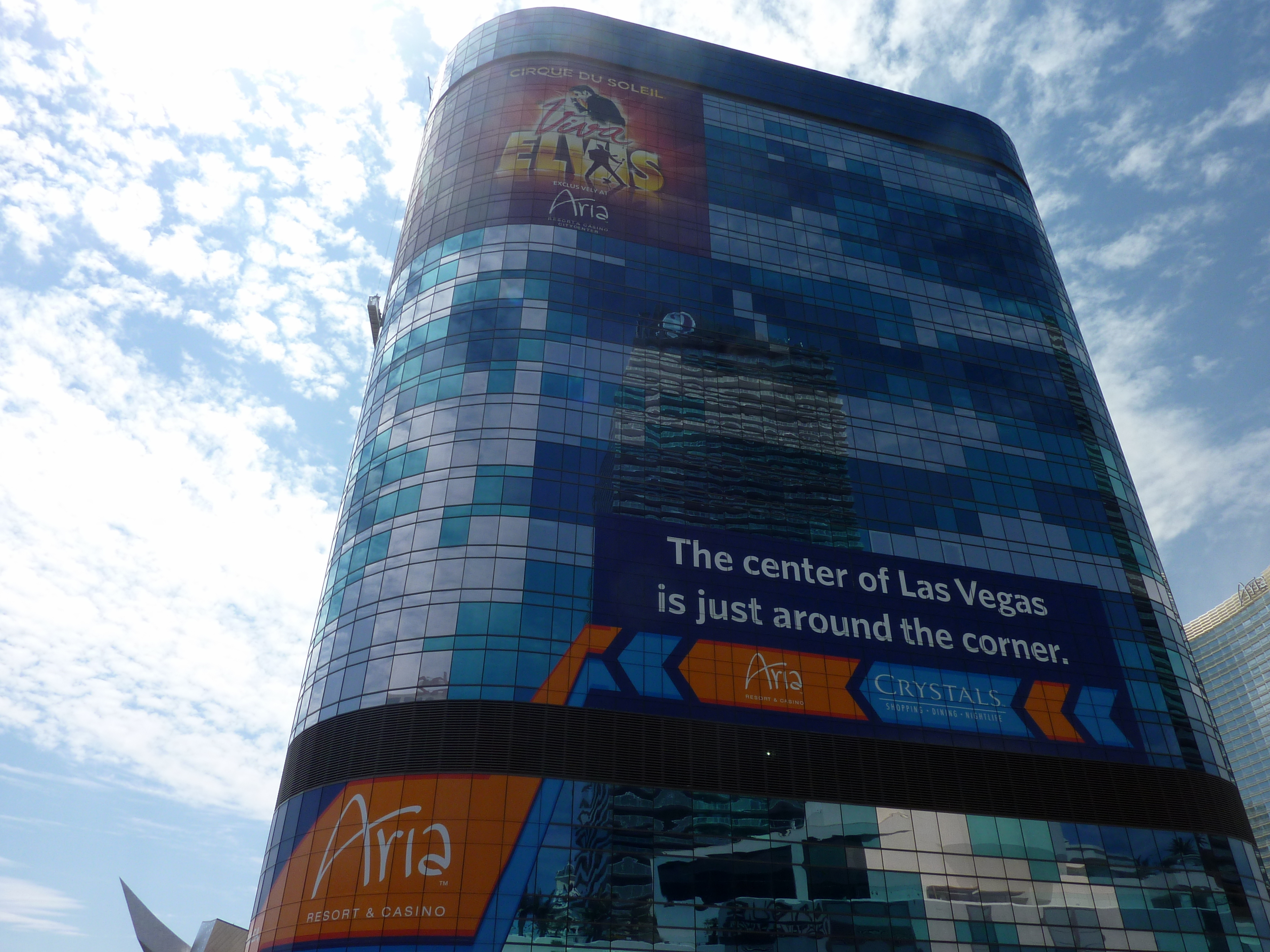
The Harmon in 2012, being used to advertise other CityCenter attractions

In March 2010, MGM called the Harmon a "total loss" and removed Perini, bringing an end to construction and postponing completion indefinitely. MGM had spent $275 million on the project, which remained as a largely empty shell for the rest of its existence. Later that month, Perini filed a lawsuit and mechanic's lien against MGM and Dubai World, seeking to collect $492 million in unpaid CityCenter construction bills, relating primarily to the Harmon. MGM filed a counterclaim, to which Perini responded, "They either don't want to or don't have the ability to pay." In July 2010, Clark County District Court judge Elizabeth Gonzalez ordered that Perini be allowed back on-site to conduct an inspection for its lawsuit. By the end of 2010, MGM wanted to demolish the Harmon. The building's exterior, by that point, was being used as a billboard for other CityCenter attractions.

Walter P Moore, the county's structural engineering consultant, found in April 2011 that the Harmon "suffered from certain vulnerabilities". Weidlinger Associates, an engineering firm hired by MGM at the county's request, further analyzed the Harmon and concluded in July 2011 that the building was not salvageable, stating that its defects "are so pervasive and varied in character that it is not possible to quickly implement a temporary or permanent repair to remediate the defects, or even determine whether such repairs can be performed". The firm determined that a strong earthquake would likely cause a partial or complete collapse of the building, and it was estimated that any possible repairs would take up to three years to complete. According to Perini, the Harmon was stable and salvageable despite being "defectively designed". The company also said it was willing and able to repair the Harmon, disputing claims of a potential building collapse.

Because the Harmon was deemed a safety hazard, the county gave MGM and Dubai World five weeks to devise a strategy for either repairing or demolishing the structure. MGM submitted a preliminary plan to demolish the Harmon by implosion. Clark County District Court prohibited any alterations or demolition from taking place until the lawsuit reached a resolution. Perini opposed demolition, stating that such action would destroy evidence of defective design in the lawsuit. The company also criticized the county for supporting demolition of the Harmon, stating that this would allow MGM to "evade its responsibilities relating to the design defects".

Some of MGM's lawyers had previously been involved in another lawsuit against Perini, and Judge Gonzalez disqualified them from the Harmon case as a result. MGM appealed the decision, delaying the Harmon lawsuit for nearly a year. In October 2011, the Nevada Supreme Court ruled in MGM's favor.

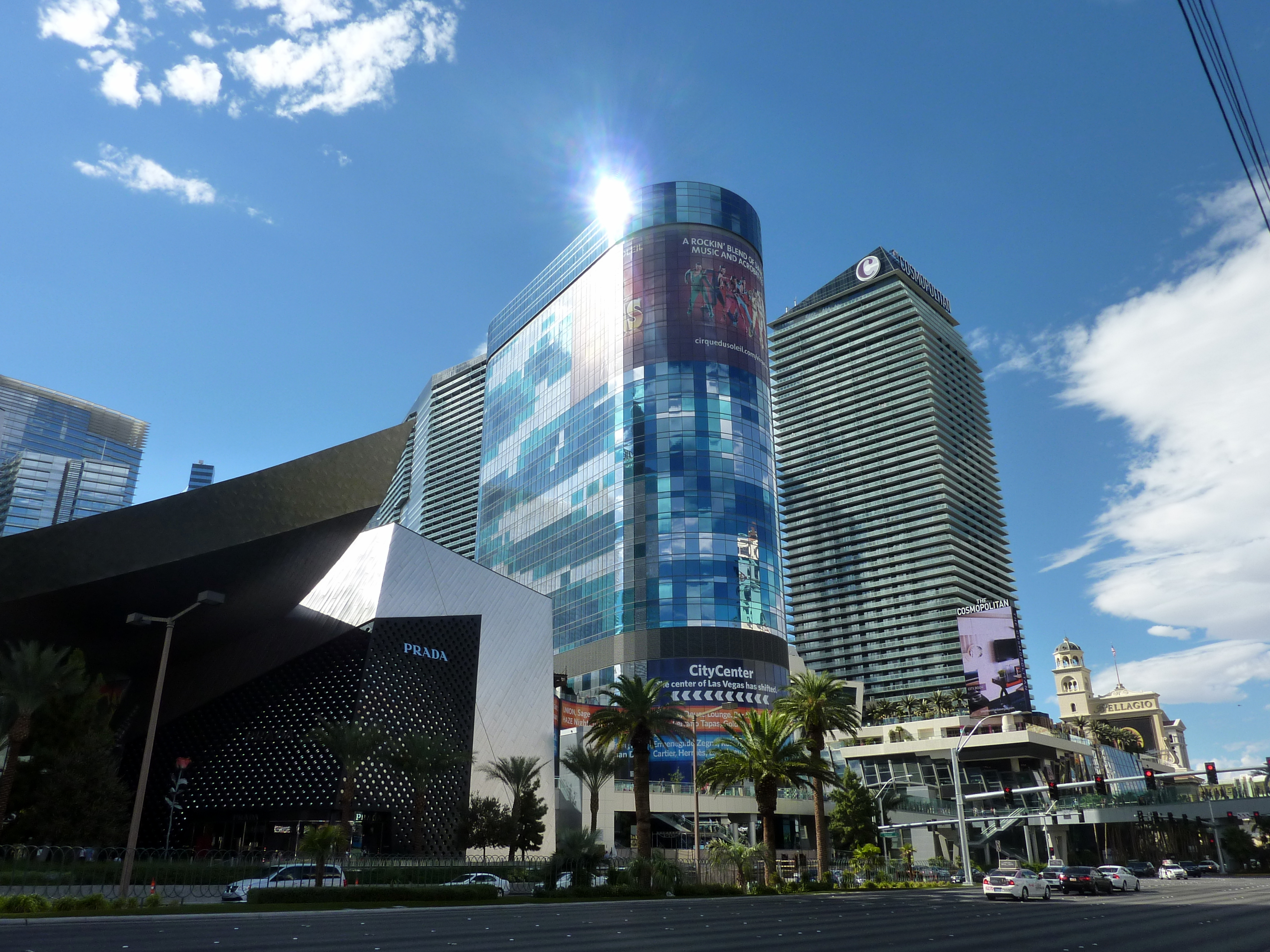
The Harmon, as seen from the Strip in 2012

A hearing began in March 2012, to determine whether Perini was owed money for its time spent on the project or if MGM should be compensated for the construction defects. Due to the size and complexity of the Harmon case, the hearing was scheduled to resume in July 2012, giving lawyers more time to prepare. Perini wanted to leave the Harmon intact for jurors to see during the trial, scheduled to begin in 2013. However, during the latter hearing, Gonzalez gave approval for the structure to be demolished, stating that contractors had ample time to collect trial evidence. Perini had argued that the building's implosion would be widely covered in media, thereby influencing jurors. The company appealed Gonzalez's ruling. It also accused MGM of using public relations firms to create negative stories about the contractor and taint the upcoming jury.

MGM later conducted additional tests at the Harmon to build a better case, thereby invalidating Gonzalez's earlier approval for demolition, which had been based on the belief that adequate testing had been completed. Perini's engineering consultant later said that MGM's most recent testing of the structure had caused more damage than anticipated, making it beyond repair.

The trial was originally set to include payment issues relating to the rest of CityCenter. At the end of 2012, Gonzalez broke this up into separate trials, with the payment case set to begin in June 2013. The Harmon defect case was scheduled to start seven months later. In early 2013, Gonzalez regrouped the two cases as a single trial, now set to begin in January 2014. However, the start date was delayed several times. MGM added new lawyers to its team and, in February 2013, named Halcrow Yolles as a new defendant, stating that the latter missed and failed to report the faulty rebar installation. The trial was expected to last a year, and the courtroom required alterations to accommodate the large number of lawyers and amount of evidence in the case.

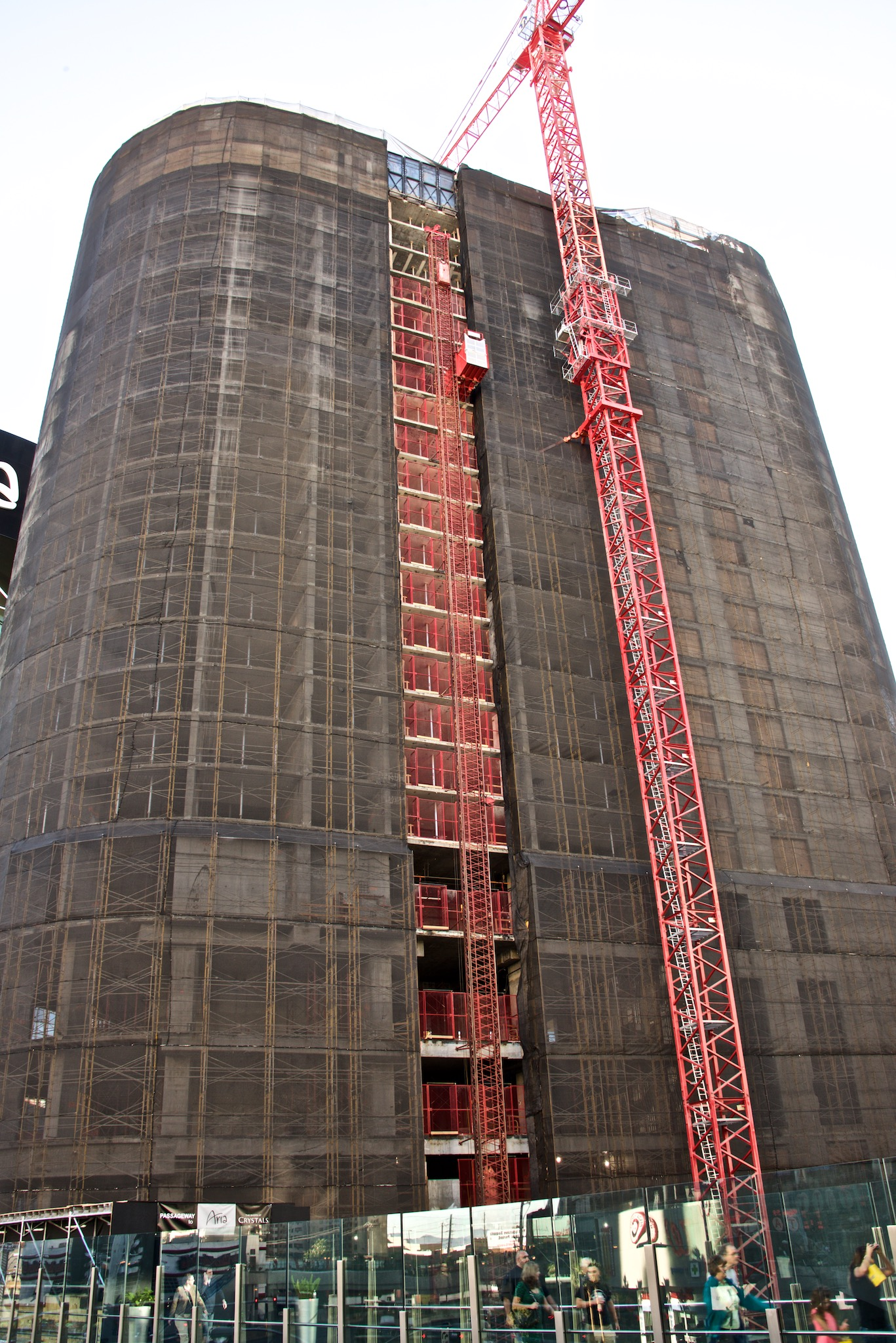
Dismantling of the tower, November 2014

Gonzalez approved demolition again in August 2013, after reviewing the latest test data from MGM. A formal proof of loss for the building was filed shortly thereafter. Gonzalez rescinded her demolition approval several months later, after FM Global, which wrote the Harmon's construction insurance policy, requested more time to review the $393 million claim.

After 15 months of negotiations, a settlement between MGM and Perini was announced on December 16, 2014, the same day that the trial had been set to begin. MGM agreed to pay $153 million to Perini, and the latter paid $11 million.

=== Demolition and redevelopment ===
Gonzalez issued her final approval for demolition in May 2014, and the process began the following month. Plans to demolish the Harmon by implosion were scrapped due to its proximity to other structures, including CityCenter's shopping mall, Crystals. Instead, the tower was dismantled floor-by-floor, at a cost of $11.5 million.

Demolition of the tower concluded in August 2015, and MGM considered using the newly vacant property to expand Crystals, although this idea did not materialize. The land was eventually sold for $80 million in 2021, to developers Brett Torino and Flag Luxury Group. A four-story shopping mall, known as 63, opened on the site in 2023.

== Architectural reception ==
The Harmon's design received negative reception among architecture critics. Christopher Hawthorne of the Los Angeles Times felt that it stood alone among CityCenter's buildings "in its willingness to look un-pretty", its blue-and-white façade suggesting "a cross between a disco ball and a 1970s mirrored-glass office tower by Kevin Roche or John Portman". According to James S. Russell, writing for Bloomberg News, "The design of the oblong Harmon Hotel, 28 floors in nervous patches of blue reflective glass, has been phoned-in" by Foster. Paul Goldberger of The New Yorker wrote that Foster "seems not to have known how to deal with the Las Vegas environment, and was content to cover a formally uninteresting, modem-shaped building with several shades of reflective glass, a gesture that aims for flamboyance but comes off seeming a little halfhearted". Regarding the hotel's reduced height, Joe Brown of the Las Vegas Sun wrote that "the incredible shrinking Harmon seems unfortunately fated to look like a stubby, squashed stepchild next to its soaring CityCenter siblings".

== Gallery ==
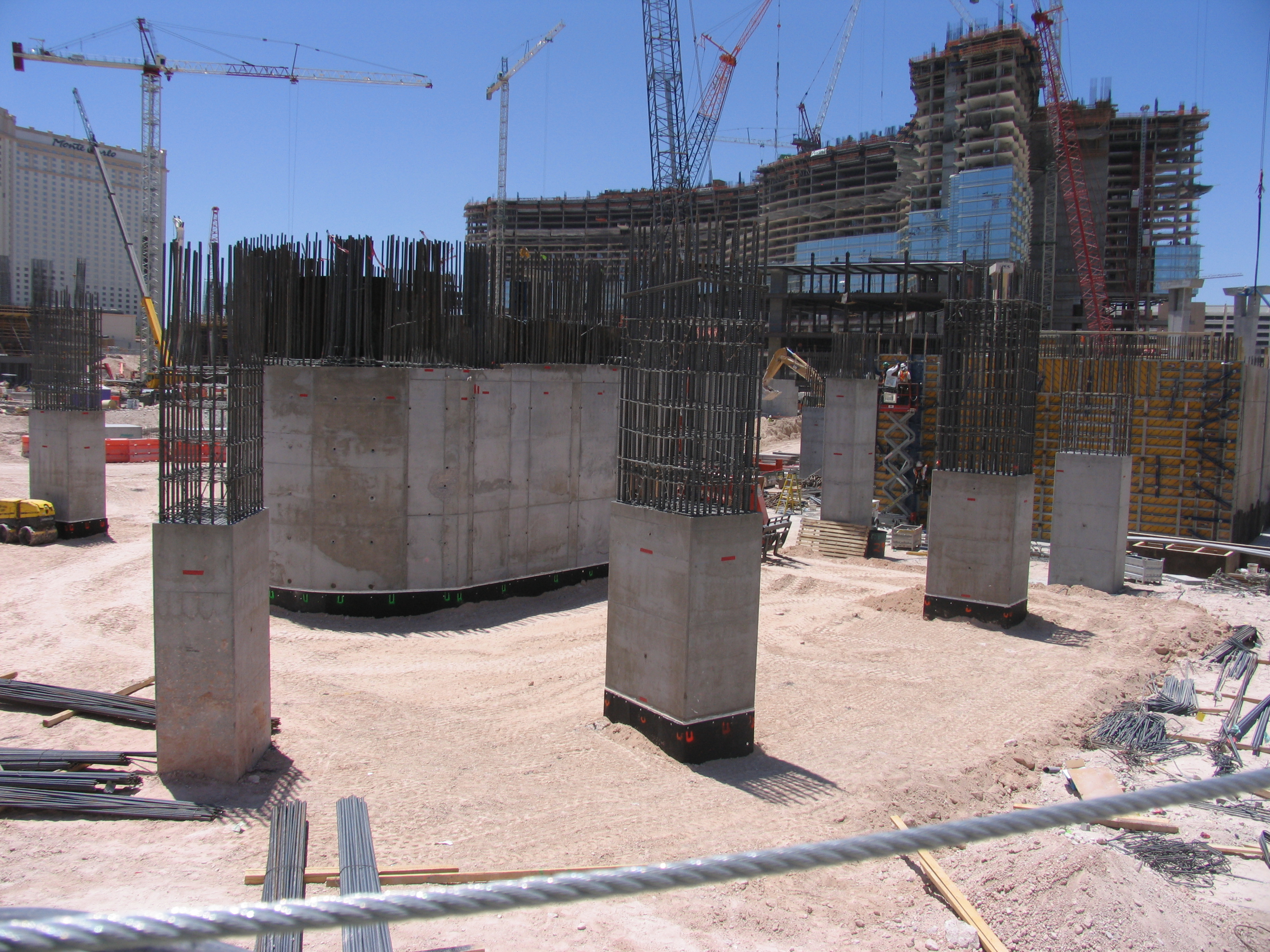
Construction progress in June 2007

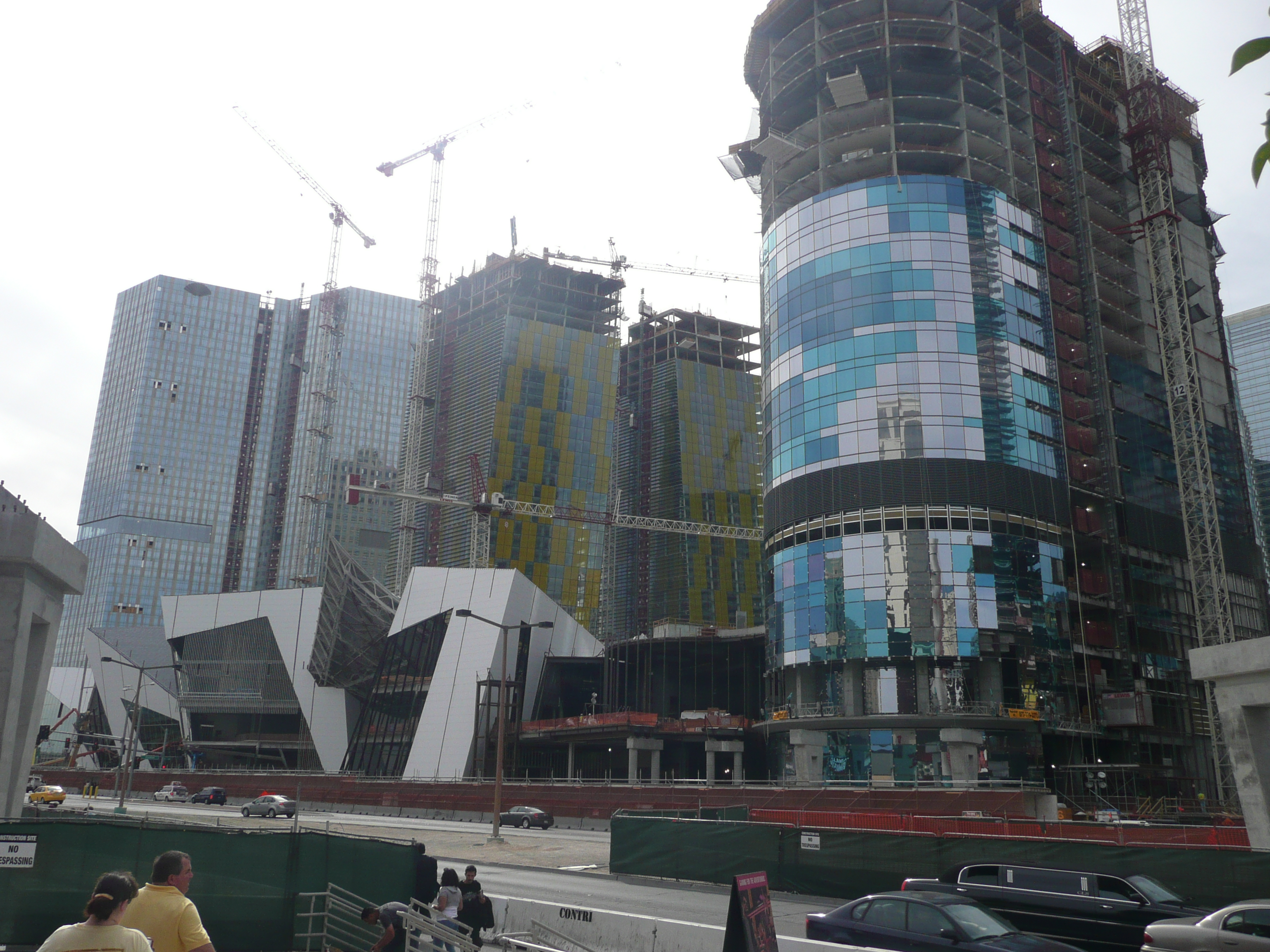
Construction progress in February 2009

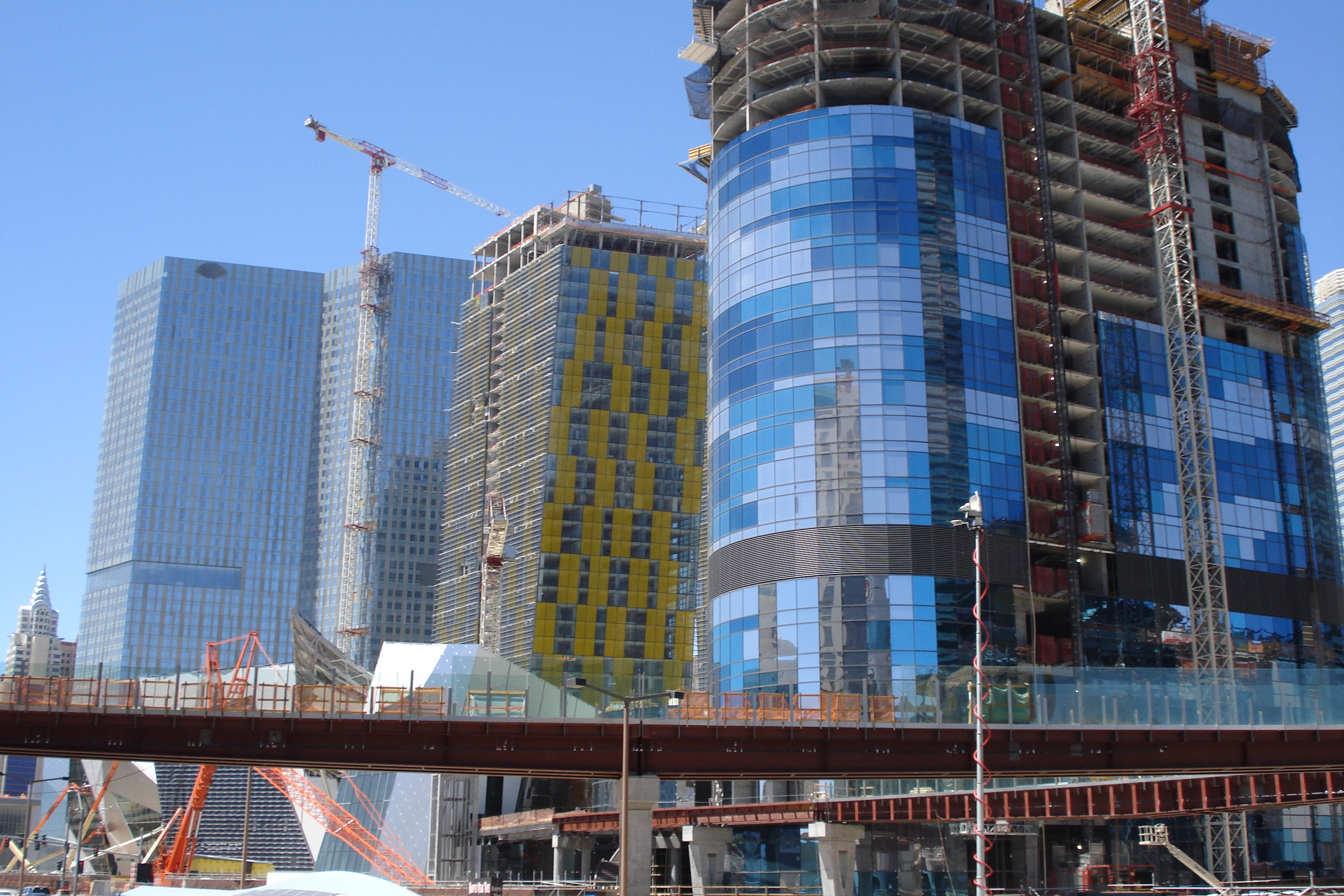
Construction progress in July 2009

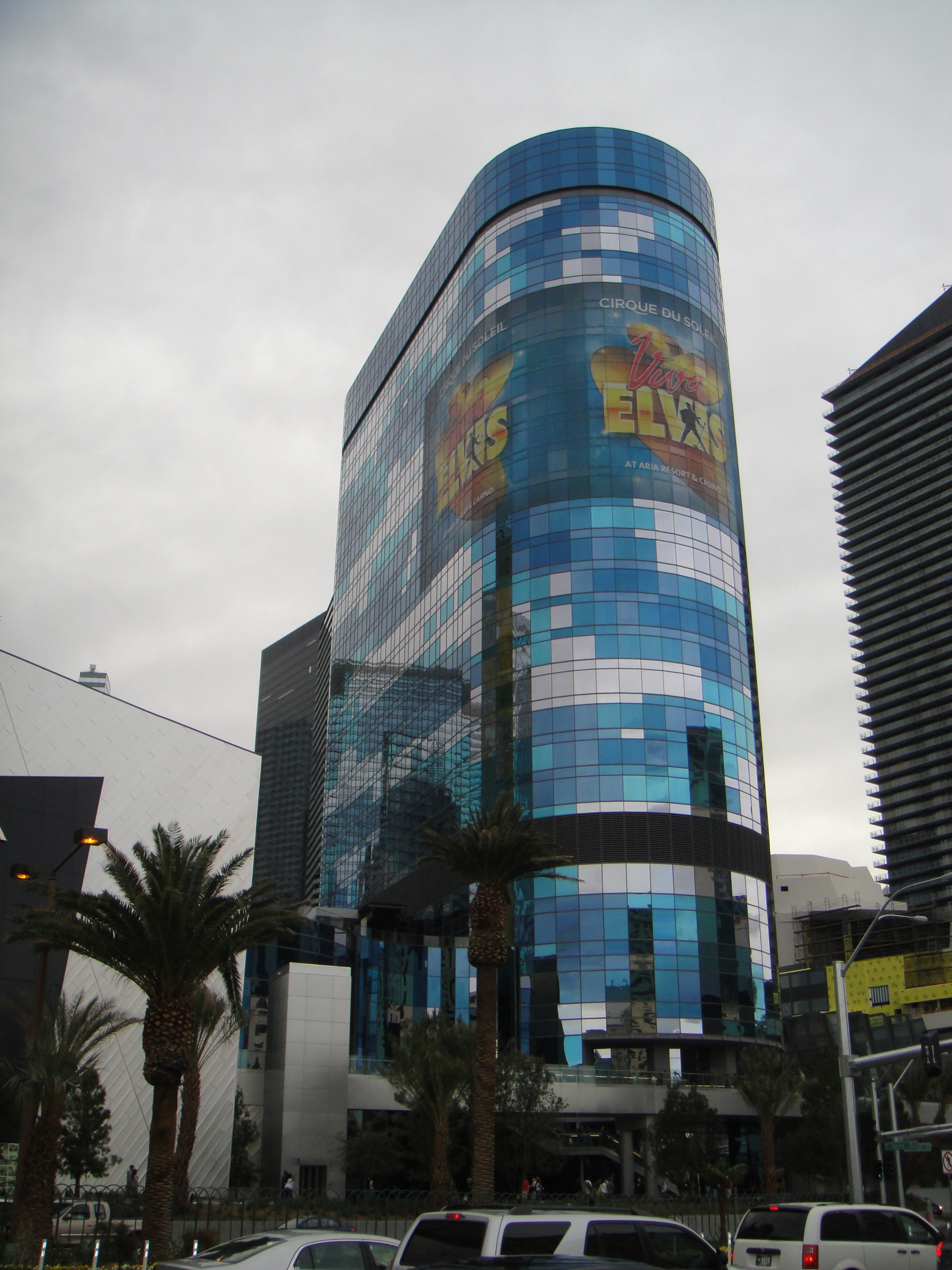
Southeast side after exterior completion

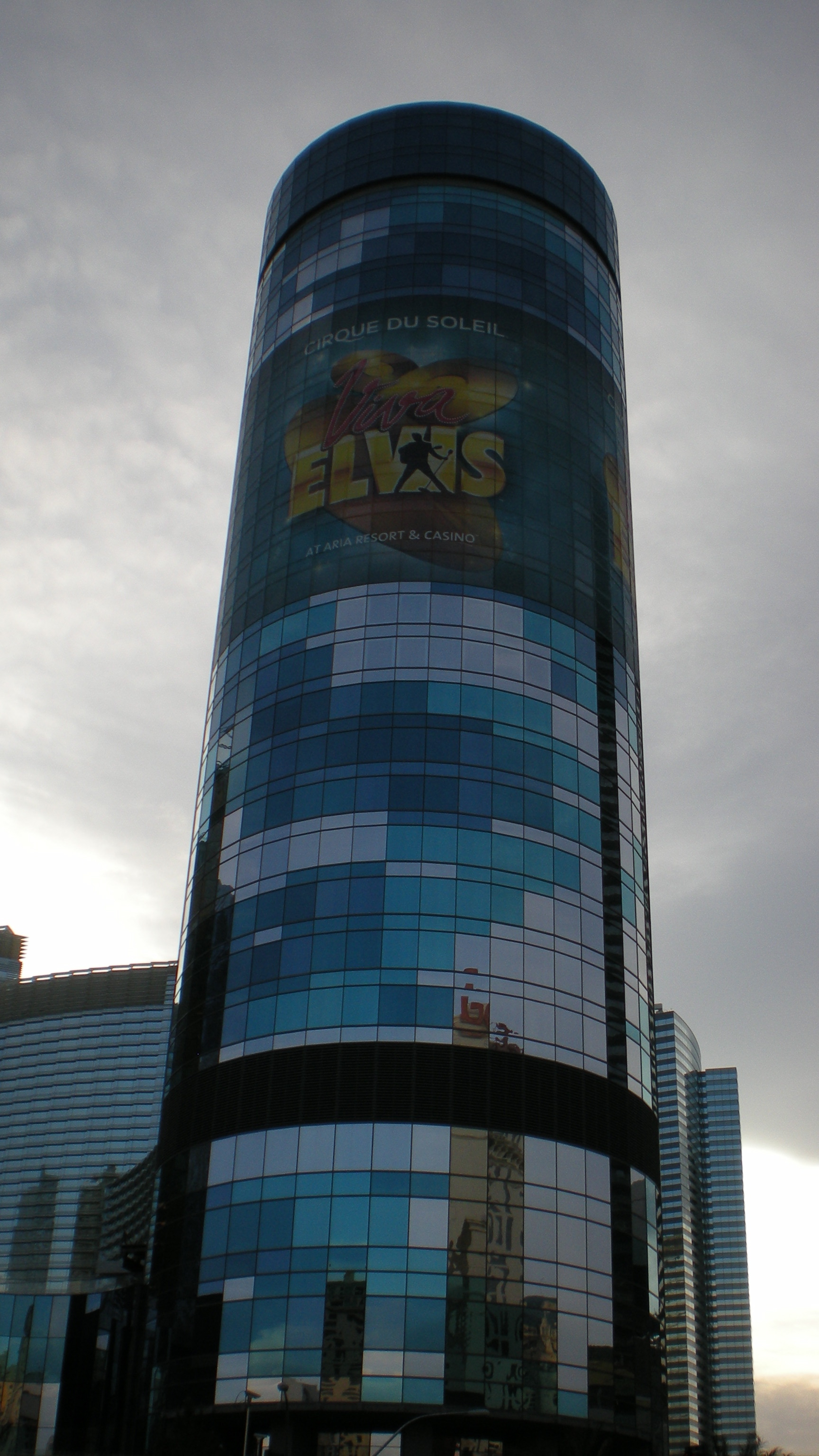
The Harmon in 2010, advertising the Viva Elvis show at CityCenter's Aria resort

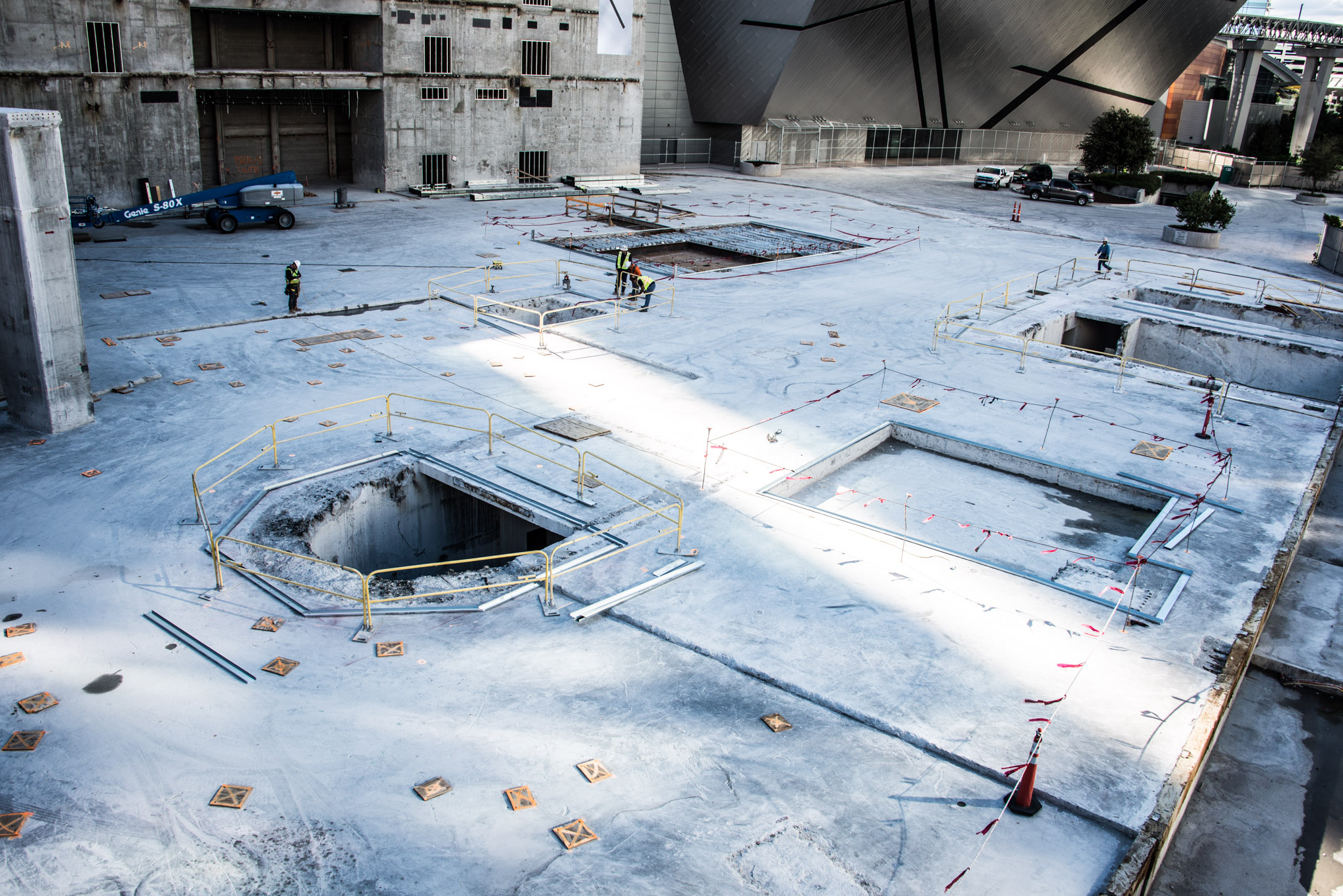
Site of the former hotel in November 2015

== See also ==
- List of tallest voluntarily demolished buildings
