= Saboten Con =

Anime convention in Phoenix

Coordinates: 33°27′7″N 112°4′14″W

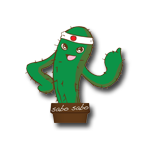
- Status: Active
- Genre: Anime, Japanese culture
- Venue: Sheraton Phoenix Downtown
- Location: Phoenix, Arizona
- Country: United States
- Inaugurated: 2008
- Attendance: 23,000 (est.) in 2021
- Organizer: Monkey Paw Entertainment
- Website: http://www.sabotencon.com/

Saboten Con is an annual four-day anime convention held during August/September at the Sheraton Phoenix Downtown in Phoenix, Arizona. The convention is held over Labor Day weekend. Its name comes from the Japanese word saboten, meaning "cactus".

== Programming ==
The convention typically offers an anime music video contest, anime screenings, concerts, gaming, karaoke, masquerade, Japanese fashion show, maid cafes, panels, screenings, steampunk ball, vendors, and workshops. The convention had over 700 hours of programming in 2017.

== History ==
Saboten Con was named the "Best Anime Convention – 2010" by the Phoenix New Times. Saboten Con 2020 was cancelled due to the COVID-19 pandemic. The convention for 2021 had a mask policy. Saboten Con expanded in 2023 by adding space at the Renaissance Phoenix Downtown, along with hosting a gaming event named SaboSlam. SaboSlam was expanded in 2026.

=== Event history ===
Dates	Location	Attendance	Guests
May 24–26, 2008	Crowne Plaza Phoenix; Phoenix, Arizona		Adella, Mara Aum, Greg Ayres, Laura Bailey, Katie Bair, Jodon Bellofatto, Johnny Yong Bosch, Erica Reis, Christophe Tang, and Armand Villavert Jr.
October 30 – November 1, 2009	Hilton Phoenix East/Mesa; Mesa, Arizona		Mara Aum, Steve Blum, David Doub, Yaya Han, Jolene Houser, Chuck Huber, Kitsune Robot, M. Alice LeGrow, Vic Mignogna, Toybox, and Armand Villavert Jr.
October 1–3, 2010	Pointe Hilton Squaw Peak Resort; Phoenix, Arizona		Mara Aum, Colleen Clinkenbeard, David Doub, Tiffany Grant, Matt Greenfield, Yaya Han, Kyle Hebert, Jolene Houser, Mary Elizabeth McGlynn, Victoria Paege, SunaCosu, Christophe Tang, and Armand Villavert Jr.
September 30 – October 2, 2011	Pointe Hilton Squaw Peak Resort; Phoenix, Arizona	2,730	Katie Bair, The Black Crystals, Rob Blatt, Johnny Yong Bosch, David Doub, Eyeshine, Yaya Han, Jolene Houser, Kairu, Kazha, Kitcho Daiko, Reuben Langdon, Sam Riegel, Sean Schemmel, Christophe Tang, and Armand Villavert Jr.
September 1–3, 2012	Renaissance Glendale; Glendale, Arizona	3,432	Troy Baker, David Doub, Richard Epcar, Jolene Houser, Kazha, Li Kovacs, Phil LaMarr, Linda Le, Mary Elizabeth McGlynn, Kevin McKeever, Ellyn Stern, Christophe Tang, Armand Villavert Jr., and Akira Yamaoka.
August 31 – September 2, 2013	Renaissance Glendale; Glendale, Arizona	4,002	Laura Bailey, Frances Delgado, Tiffany Grant, Matt Greenfield, Jolene Houser, Kazha, Li Kovacs, Aimee Lee Lucas, Maridah, Ryan McMurry, Yuko Miyamura, Steve "Warky" Nunez, Nylon Pink, James Perry II, Joe Romersa, Spike Spencer, John Swasey, Christophe Tang, Armand Villavert Jr., Travis Willingham, Amanda Winn-Lee, and Eryn Woods.
August 29 – September 1, 2014	Renaissance Glendale; Glendale, Arizona	5,137	Robert Axelrod, D.C. Douglas, Electric Lady, Alodia Gosiengfiao, Jolene Houser, Kazha, Lauren Landa, Living Ichigo, Ryan McMurry, Moon Stream, Giada Pancaccini, James Perry II, Steve Prince, Iruma Rioka, Ian Sinclair, Christophe Tang, Alexis Tipton, and Armand Villavert Jr.
September 4–7, 2015	Sheraton Phoenix Downtown; Phoenix, Arizona	6,745	Liui Aquino, Cam Clarke, Electric Lady, Richard Epcar, Eurobeat King, Rebecca Forstadt, Crystal Graziano, David Hayter, Kanako Ito, Kazha, Kiba, Li Kovacs, Susan Lake, Aimee Lee Lucas, Melanie MacQueen, Ai Maeda, Ryan McMurry, Rika Muranaka, Cara Nicole, Tony Oliver, James Perry II, Ellyn Stern, Christophe Tang, Alfred Trujillom, Cristina Vee, Armand Villavert Jr., Dan Woren, and Tommy Yune.
September 2–5, 2016	Sheraton Grand Phoenix; Phoenix, Arizona	9,075	Eurobeat King, Kyle Hebert, Kazha, Carrie Keranen, Kiba, Mika Kobayashi, Ladybeard, Susan Lake, Yuri Lowenthal, M-Project, Ryan McMurry, Erica Mendez, Tara Platt, Reika, The Slants, Eric Stuart, Christophe Tang, Alfred Trujillo, Twinzik, Heather Vaughn, Armand Villavert Jr., David Vincent, and Lisle Wilkerson.
September 1–4, 2017	Sheraton Grand Phoenix; Phoenix, Arizona	12,132	Robert Axelrod, Morgan Berry, Johnny Yong Bosch, Ben Diskin, Eurobeat Kasumi, Eyeshine, Hollow Mellow, Kazha, Kiba, Susan Lake, Cherami Leigh, Ryan McMurry, Yuko Miyamura, Enji Night, Steve "Warky" Nunez, Christophe Tang, and Dave Trosko.
August 31 – September 3, 2018	Sheraton Grand Phoenix; Phoenix, Arizona	13,298	Akira, Feodor Chin, Leon Chiro, Les E. Claypool III, D-Piddy, Ivy Doomkitty, Eurobeat Kasumi, Kazha, Susan Lake, Phil Mizuno, Paul Nakauchi, Brina Palencia, Chris Parson, Josh Petersdorf, J. Michael Tatum, Armand Villavert Jr., and Amanda Winn-Lee.
August 30 – September 2, 2019	Sheraton Grand Phoenix; Phoenix, Arizona		Steve Blum, Maile Flanagan, Sandy Fox, David Hayter, Kazha, Kiba, Knitemaya, Susan Lake, Lex Lang, Rica Matsumoto, Mary Elizabeth McGlynn, The Sound Bee HD, Christophe Tang, Armand Villavert Jr., and Akira Yamaoka.
September 3–6, 2021	Sheraton Grand Phoenix; Phoenix, Arizona	23,000 (est.)	Mary Claypool, Les E. Claypool III, D-Piddy, Olivia Hack, Kohei Hattori, Atelier Heidi, Johnny 'N' Junkers, Kazha, and Faye Mata.
September 2-5, 2022	Sheraton Phoenix Downtown; Phoenix, Arizona		Corina Boettger, Eurobeat Kasumi, Dave Fennoy, Sandy Fox, Kazha, Hirokatsu Kihara, Susan Lake, Lex Lang, Alyson Tabbitha, Armand Villavert Jr., and Michael "Knightmage" Wilson.
September 1-4, 2023	Sheraton Phoenix Downtown; Renaissance Phoenix Downtown; Phoenix, Arizona		Ayakashi no Kiko, Beau Billingslea, Mary Claypool, Les E. Claypool III, D-Piddy, Ben Diskin, Ivy Doomkitty, Richard Epcar, Eurobeat Kasumi, Olivia Hack, Daisuke Hasegawa, Kohei Hattori, David Hayter, Kazha, Carrie Keranen, Jennie Kwan, Susan Lake, Stephanie Nadolny, Zeno Robinson, Michelle Ruff, Satoshi, Ellyn Stern, John Swasey, Tokyo Psychopath, Armand Villavert Jr., Kari Wahlgren, and Michael "Knightmage" Wilson.
August 30 - September 2, 2024	Sheraton Phoenix Downtown; Renaissance Phoenix Downtown; Phoenix, Arizona		Babybeard, Chris Cason, Jennifer Cihi, Mary Claypool, Les E. Claypool III, Eurobeat Kasumi, Dorothy Fahn, Tom Fahn, Maile Flanagan, Tiffany Grant, John Gremillion, Daisuke Hasegawa, Kyle Hebert, Chuck Huber, Kazha, Michael Kovach, Susan Lake, Mike McFarland, Brandon Peterson, Natalie Rial, Tara Sands, Joshua Seth, Sparrowhawk Cosplay, Jack Stansbury, SuperKayce, and Armand Villavert Jr.
August 29 - September 1, 2025	Sheraton Phoenix Downtown; Renaissance Phoenix Downtown; Phoenix, Arizona		Bryson Baugus, Brian Beacock, John Bentley, Charlet Chung, Richard Epcar, Sandy Fox, Caitlin Glass, Kazha, Christina Marie Kelly, Susan Lake, Lex Lang, Midnight Pursona, Patrick Pedraza, Josh Petersdorf, Brandon Peterson, Armand Villavert Jr., Ellyn Stern, Joshua Waters, and Cory Yee.
September 4-7, 2026	Sheraton Phoenix Downtown; Renaissance Phoenix Downtown; Phoenix, Arizona		Andrew J. Alandy, Babybeard, Edward Bosco, Sean Chiplock, Jordan Dash Cruz, Jason Douglas, Xanthe Huynh, Asami Imai, Kazha, Lauren Landa, Erica Mendez, Cassandra Lee Morris, Celeste Perez, Keith Silverstein, Benjamin Stegmair, Alexis Tipton, Sora Tokui, Utahime, and Armand Villavert Jr.

== Gallery ==
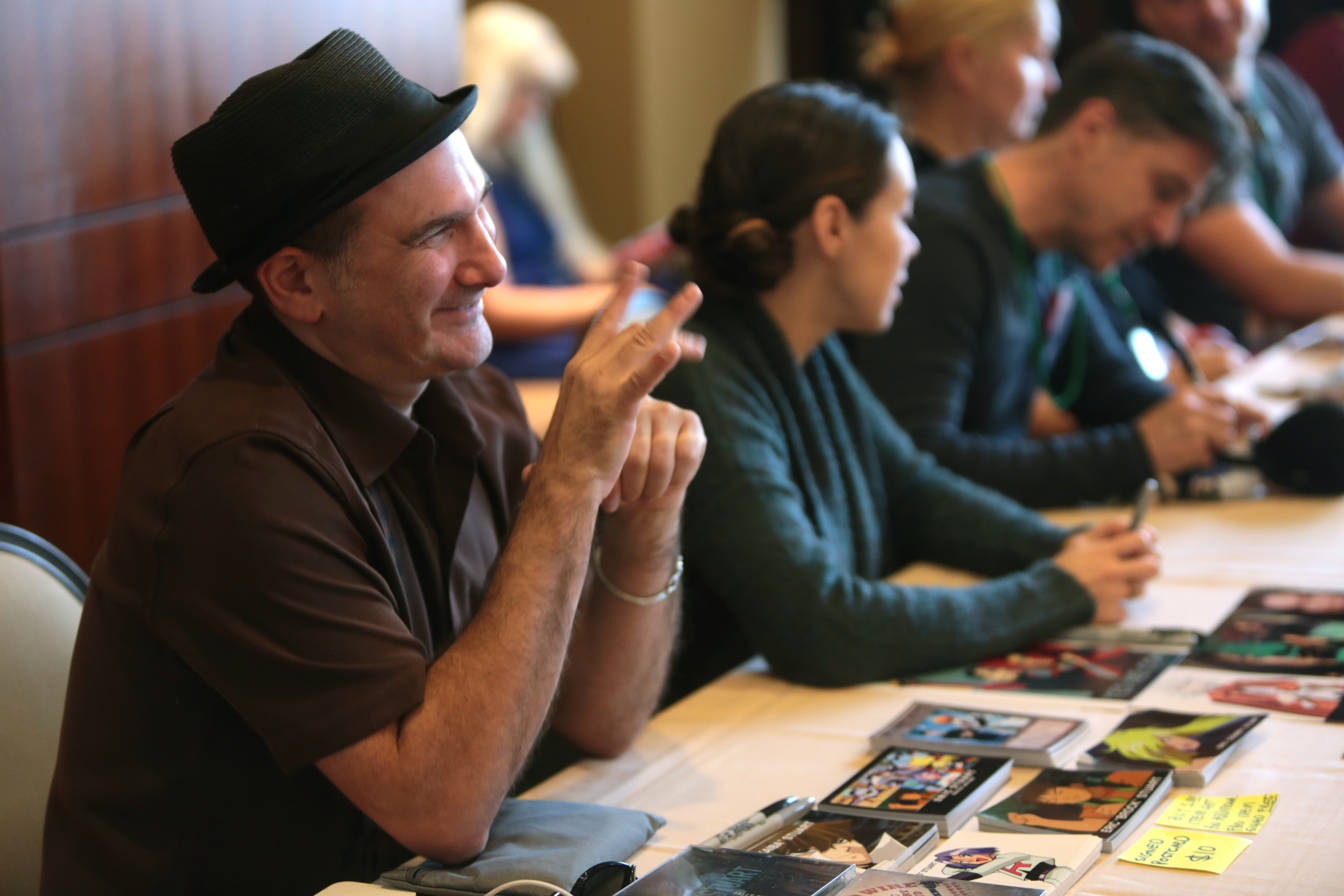
Voice actor guests signing autographs for attendees at Saboten Con 2016.
