= Perini Building Company =

The Perini Building Company is a division of Tutor Perini Corporation. The corporation consolidated its construction divisions and created Perini Building company in 1991. Perini Building Company is one of the oldest American construction companies still in operation today. Perini Building Company specializes in the construction of commercial, industrial, healthcare, science and technology, and hospitality projects. The company has undertaken a wide range of projects, from the construction of the U.S. Embassy in Moscow, Russia to the expansion of the San Diego Convention Center.

== Projects ==
- CityCenter
- Trump Las Vegas
- Boston Worcester Turnpike
- Thomas and Mack Center
- Hard Rock Hotel and Casino
- Harrah's Las Vegas
- Pala Casino Resort and Spa
- The Palms
- Mohegan Sun
- Sheraton Phoenix Downtown
- Cosmopolitan of Las Vegas
- Hudson Yards Redevelopment Project
- Luxor Las Vegas
- The Harmon
