= 63 CityCenter =

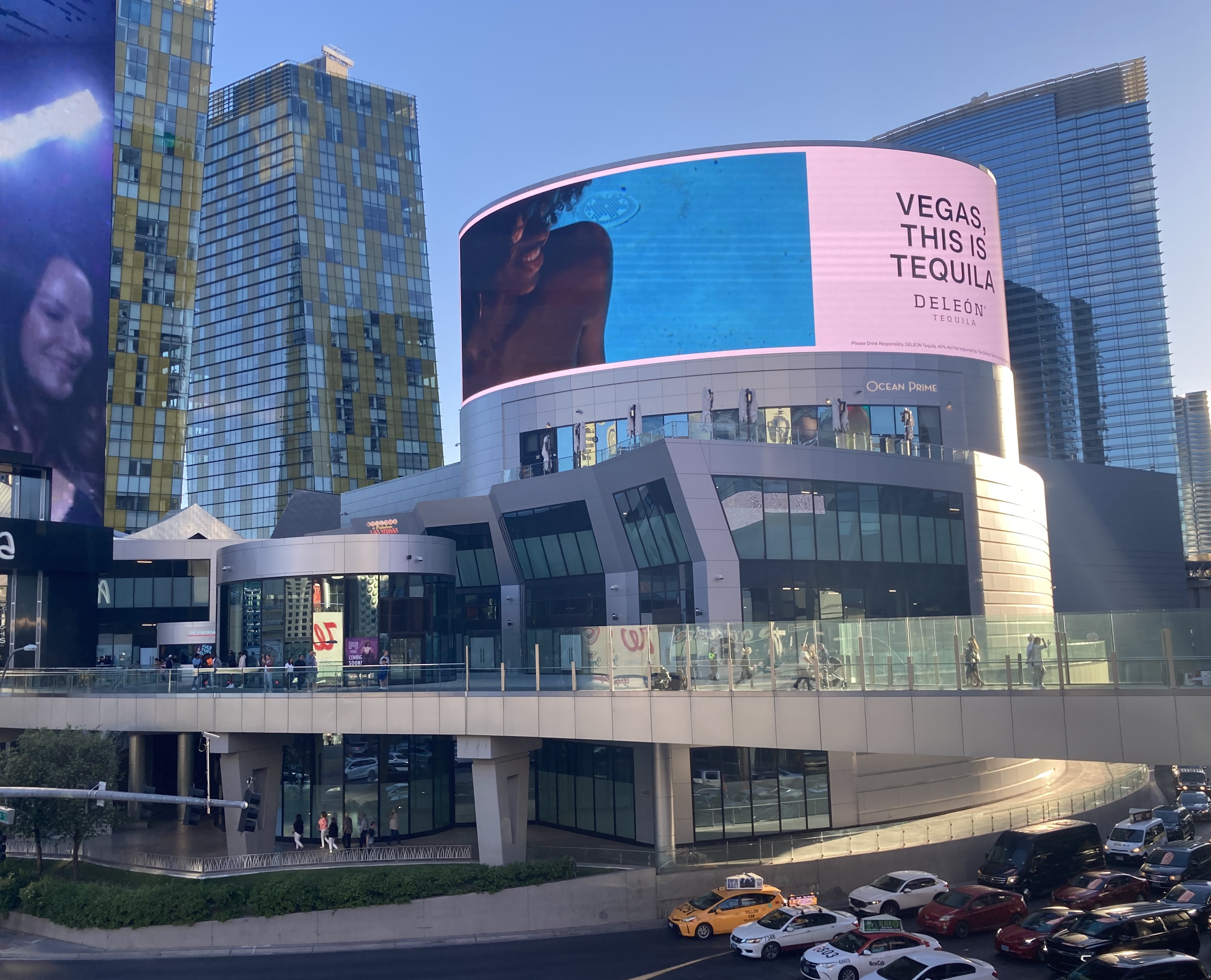
- Location: Paradise, Nevada
- Coordinates: 36.108681°N 115.173611°W
- Address: 3716 South Las Vegas Boulevard
- Opened: April 2023
- Developer: Brett Torino; Flag Luxury Group
- Owner: Brett Torino; Flag Luxury Group
- Floor area: 228,278 sq ft (21,207.7 m^{2})
- Floors: 4
- Website: 63citycenter.com

63 CityCenter is a four-story shopping mall on the Las Vegas Strip in Paradise, Nevada. It is part of the CityCenter complex, developed by MGM Resorts International. The two-acre site was previously planned as The Harmon, a hotel within CityCenter. However, due to structural defects, the hotel never opened and was dismantled in 2015. The property was sold six years later to developer Brett Torino and partner Flag Luxury Group, with plans to build retail space on the site. Construction of 63 CityCenter began in June 2021, and the first business in the mall opened in April 2023.

== History ==
63 CityCenter is part of the CityCenter complex, occupying a two-acre site at the southwestern corner of Las Vegas Boulevard and Harmon Avenue. The land was previously occupied by The Harmon, an unfinished CityCenter hotel that was dismantled in 2015 due to structural defects. In April 2021, MGM Resorts International and its CityCenter partner, Dubai World, agreed to sell the land to Las Vegas developer Brett Torino and New York-based Flag Luxury Group. They planned to build a four-story shopping mall known as "Project 63", named for how old Torino and Flag CEO Paul Kanavos were at the time. The name was later shortened to "63". In 2024, the mall's name would be changed to 63 CityCenter.

The project was designed by Arquitectonica and Knit Studios, in collaboration with MGM to ensure that it complements the existing CityCenter complex. MGM sold the land on the condition that a high-rise not be built on the property. The company approved of 63's four-story height, which would have minimal effect on the views from CityCenter's hotels.

The $80 million sale was finalized in June 2021, and construction began that month, with Penta Building Group as general contractor. Site preparation work took around six months, and included testing of pilings and footings left over following the Harmon's dismantling. 63 CityCenter was topped off on April 26, 2022, one year after the land sale was announced. Much of the facility was completed in October 2022, with the remainder expected to be finished four months later. The first business in the center, a gift shop, opened in April 2023.

== Features ==
63 CityCenter covers 228,278 sq ft (21,207.7 m^{2}) across four floors. It is located directly north of CityCenter's high-end shopping mall, The Shops at Crystals, although the two do not compete with each other. The exterior of 63 CityCenter includes an LED billboard measuring 6,000 sq ft (560 m^{2}).

Ocean Prime opened a $20 million steakhouse on the top floor in June 2023. At 14,500 sq ft (1,350 m^{2}), it is the brand's largest restaurant and its flagship location. It is also the first Ocean Prime to open in Las Vegas, and serves as the anchor restaurant for 63 CityCenter.

Museum of Illusions opened their flagship location at 63 CityCenter in August 2023. Arte Museum, a series of immersive art exhibits, also opened that year in a two-story, 30,000 sq ft (2,800 m^{2}) space. It already operated locations in Asia, and the Las Vegas site marked its U.S. debut. Other tenants added in 2023 included a Ross department store and a Fat Tuesday restaurant. In late 2024, country singer Jason Aldean opened a restaurant and entertainment venue known as Jason Aldean's Kitchen + Bar, part of a small chain.
