= Sheraton Phoenix Downtown =

High rise convention hotel

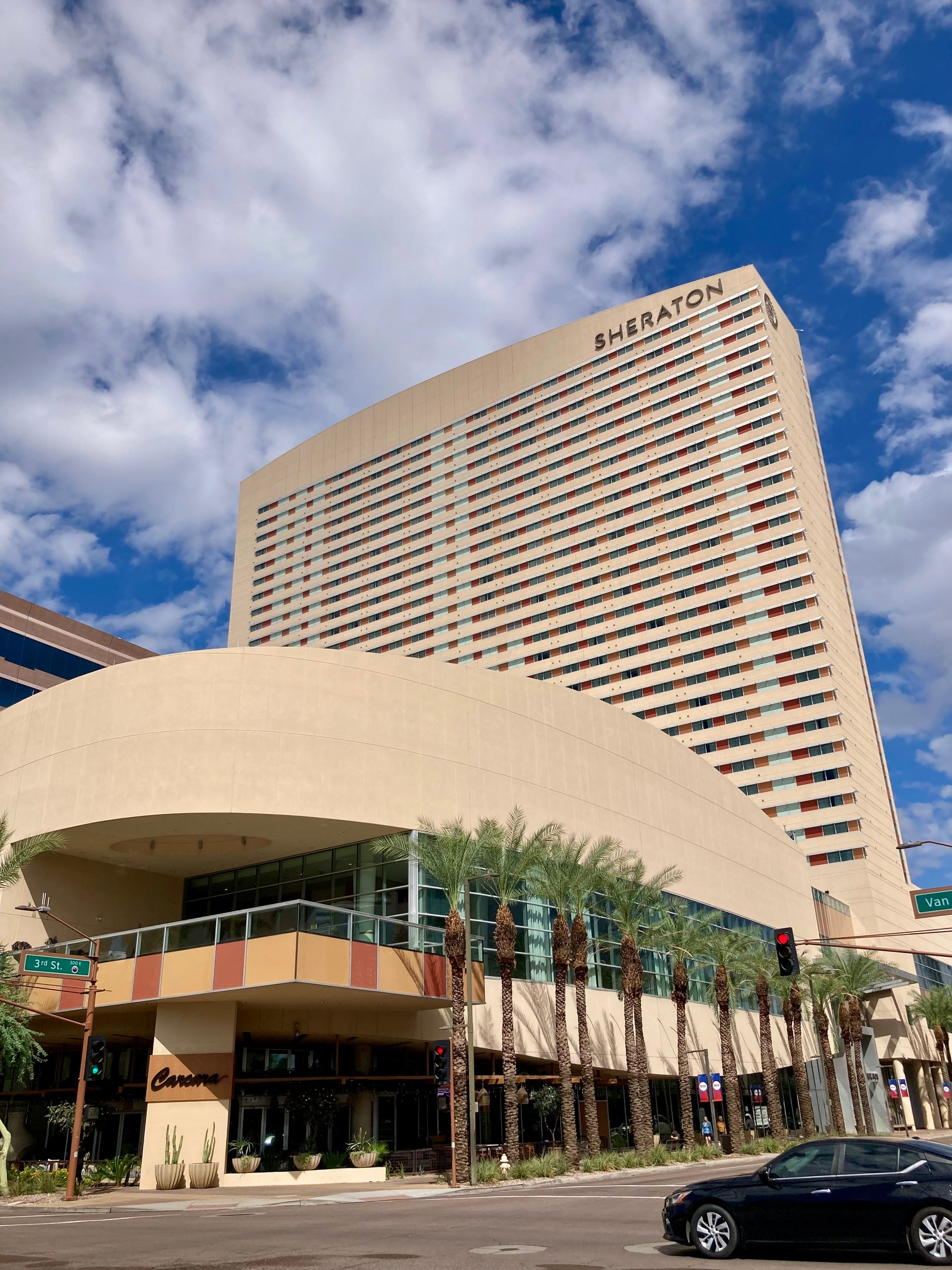
- Sheraton Phoenix Downtown
- Interactive map of the Sheraton Phoenix Downtown area

General information
- Status: Completed
- Type: Hotel
- Location: 340 N 3rd Street; Phoenix
- Coordinates: 33°27′08.00″N 112°04′14.00″W
- Construction started: March 28, 2006
- Completed: 2008
- Opening: September 30, 2008
- Cost: $350 million (USD)
- Owner: The Blackstone Group

Height
- Roof: 360 ft (110 m)
- Top floor: 31

Technical details
- Floor count: 31

Design and construction
- Architects: Architectonica, RSP Architects
- Main contractor: Perini Building Company

The Sheraton Phoenix Downtown is a $350 million (USD), high rise convention hotel, located on 3rd Street north of Van Buren Street in Downtown Phoenix, Arizona, adjacent to the Arizona Center office/retail complex and the Phoenix Convention Center, which had its North building opened in early 2008. At 31 floors it has surpassed the Hyatt Regency Phoenix, at 24 floors, as the tallest hotel tower in Arizona.

In July, 2003, the Phoenix City Council approved the US$350 million convention center hotel, to be owned by the city, and developed and operated by Sheraton Hotels as a Starwood facility. On November 3, 2004, the city of Phoenix announced Arquitectonica and US-based RSP Architects had been selected to build the project. Groundbreaking was in late March 2006. The tower was topped out in October 2007. The Sheraton Phoenix Downtown hotel welcomed its first guests inside on September 30, 2008.

The hotel has 1,000 rooms, a 6,500-square-foot (600 m^{2}) fitness center, a 2,000-square-foot (190 m^{2}) outdoor pool and sundeck, 80,000 square feet (7,400 m^{2}) of meeting space including a 29,000-square-foot (2,700 m^{2}) ballroom and a 15,000-square-foot (1,400 m^{2}) junior ballroom. In addition, there are 16 meeting rooms, two boardrooms, and a terrace for outdoor events. The exterior color palette of browns, oranges and yellows were chosen to represent the desert sky at sunset. The curved roofline mimics the slope of nearby Camelback Mountain.

In November 2015, the hotel was renamed Sheraton Grand Phoenix, as part of Sheraton's new Sheraton Grand designation. In June 2018, the city of Phoenix sold the Sheraton Grand to Marriott International at a significant loss, for $255 million. Marriott renovated the hotel from 2019 to 2020, after which they expect to sell it. The hotel returned to its original name in early 2020, removing the Grand branding. It closed in March 2020, due to the COVID-19 pandemic though renovations continued. It reopened on April 25, 2021.
