= The Shops at Crystals =

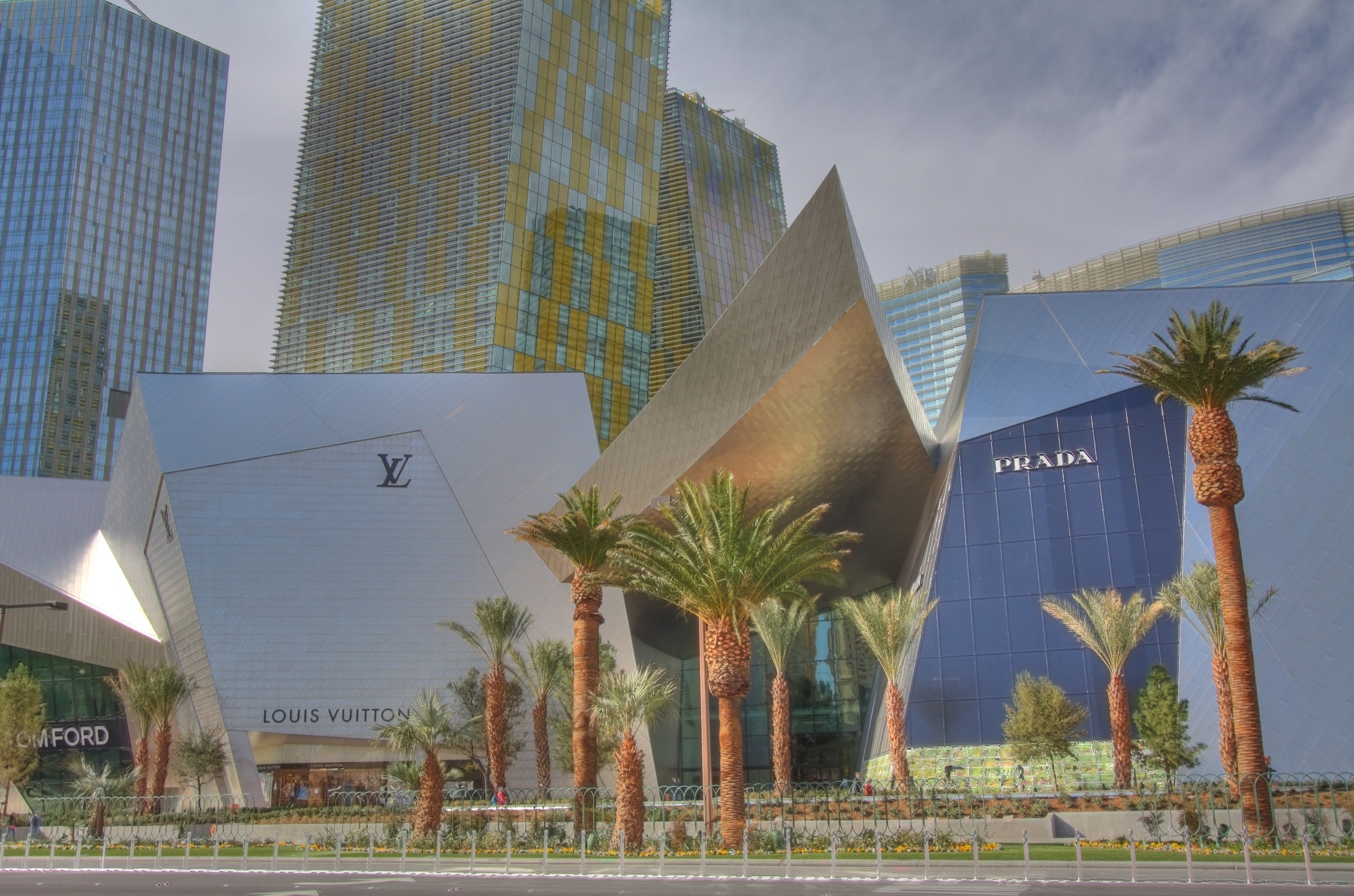
- Exterior of Crystals, as seen along the Las Vegas Strip
- Location: Las Vegas Strip, Paradise, Nevada
- Coordinates: 36°6′29″N 115°10′28″W
- Address: 3720 S. Las Vegas Boulevard; Las Vegas, NV 89109
- Opened: December 3, 2009; 16 years ago
- Owner: Invesco and Simon Property Group (50%)
- Architect: Daniel Libeskind, AAI Architects, Inc. (as architect of record)
- Num. of stores: 57
- Floor area: 500,000 sq ft (46,000 m^{2})
- Floors: 3
- Website: theshopsatcrystals.com

The Shops at Crystals is an upscale shopping mall in the CityCenter complex on the Las Vegas Strip in Paradise, Nevada. The 500,000-square-foot (46,000 m^{2}) mall contains high-end retailers, gourmet restaurants, and art galleries. The exterior design was created by Daniel Libeskind, while David Rockwell worked on interiors. For its environmentally friendly design, Crystals received LEED Gold Core & Shell certification from the U.S. Green Building Council, making it the largest retail district in the world to achieve such a feat.

Crystals opened on December 3, 2009, and was originally owned by MGM Resorts International and Dubai World. In 2016, it was sold to Invesco and Simon Property Group for $1.1 billion.

== History ==
The mall is part of the CityCenter project on the Las Vegas Strip, and was originally owned by MGM Resorts International and Dubai World. It opened on December 3, 2009, known then as simply Crystals. Despite opening during the Great Recession, MGM predicted that the mall would be successful. However, as the economic downturn began, the company had briefly reconsidered whether to proceed with construction. The mall struggled in its early years before seeing a turnaround.

By 2013, the mall had been renamed The Shops at Crystals. According to MGM chief Jim Murren, the mall was designed with the intent of eventually being sold. In April 2016, it was sold for $1.1 billion to Invesco and Simon Property Group in a joint partnership.

== Design ==
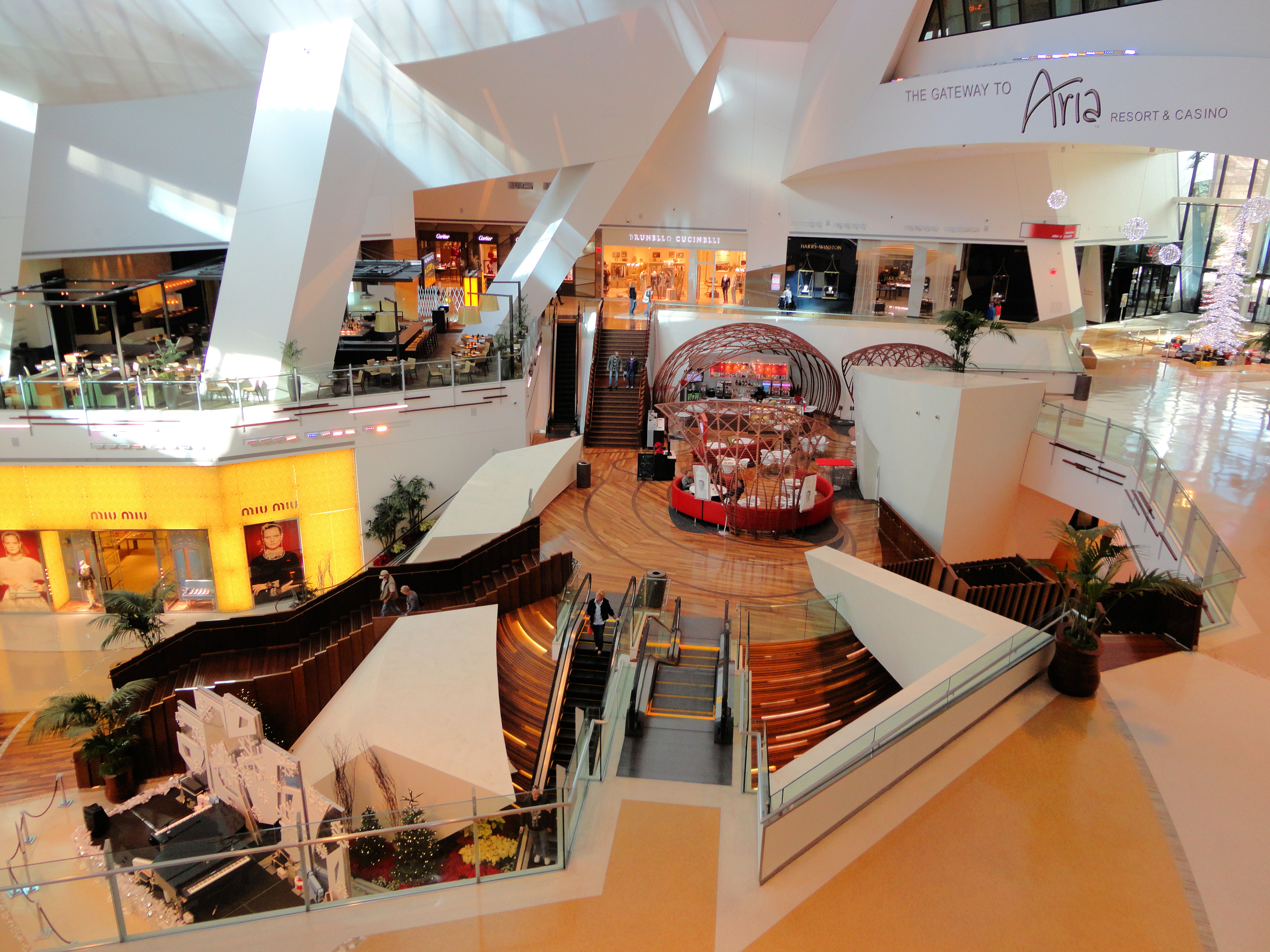
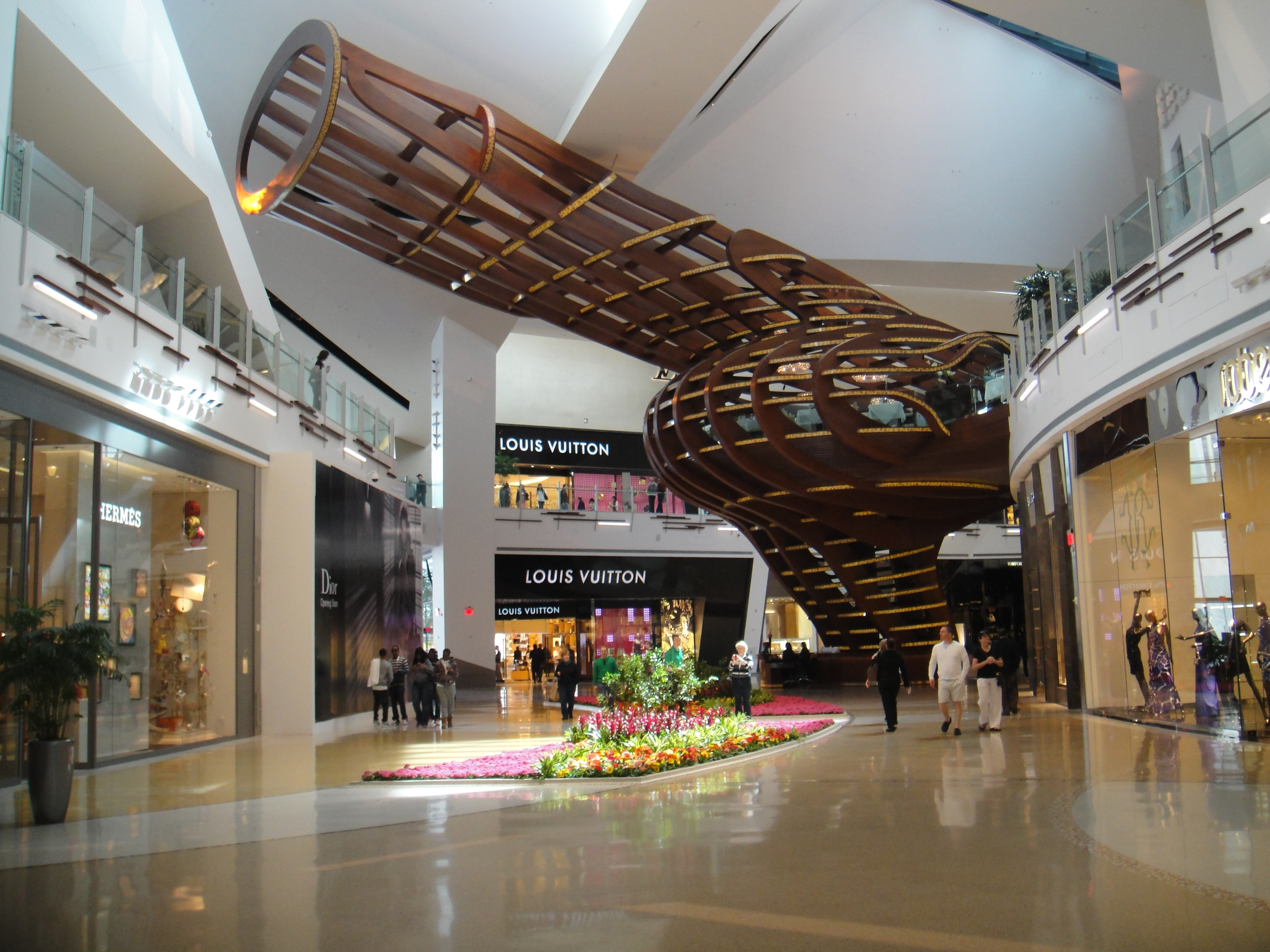
Crystals interior and treehouse structure

The exterior of Crystals was designed by Daniel Libeskind, marking his first Las Vegas project, while interior designs were done by David Rockwell. AAI Architects, Inc. served as the architect of record. Prospective retailers were attracted to the mall because of its design.

Libeskind's design includes sharp angles and an abundance of glass. The mall structure features complex steel framework which includes 19 separate roofs, uniquely shaped and overlapping in some cases.

Rockwell's design includes a grand staircase, and features an indoor park theme in some areas, including hanging gardens and a 70-foot wooden treehouse structure serving as a concierge desk and restaurant seating area. The interior also has a flower carpet that is changed regularly based on the seasons. It was inspired by the Flower Carpet event in Brussels. Ceilings reach up to 120 feet in some areas of the mall. Because of this, catwalks were built in four locations around the mall to aid in lighting maintenance.

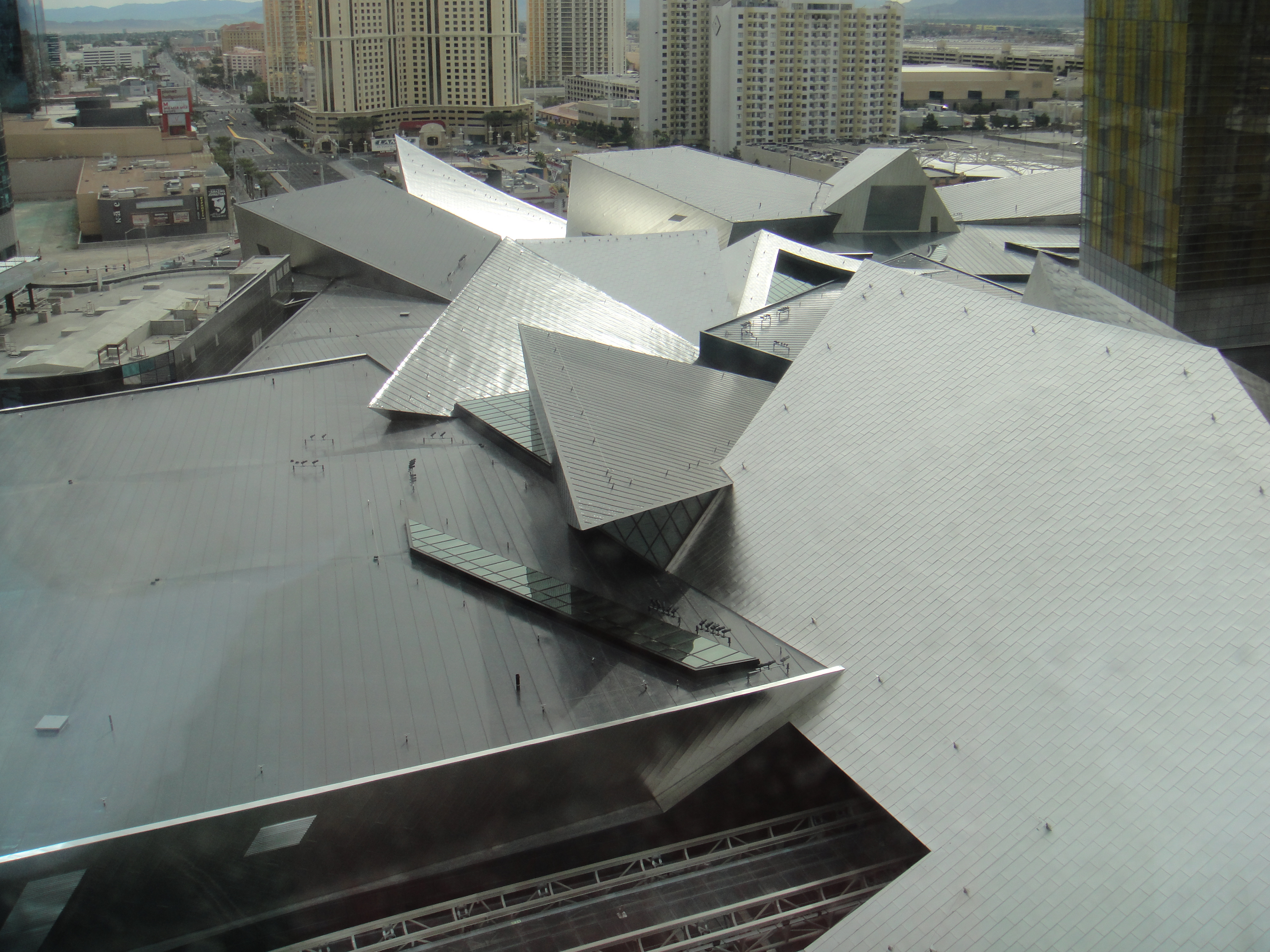
Overlooking the mall's roof and its sharp angles

Architecture critic James S. Russell, writing for Bloomberg News, called Crystals "a fun antidote to the smothering fairy-tale pomp that has become the Las Vegas norm". Another architectural critic, Paul Goldberger, wrote in The New Yorker that Libeskind's jagged shapes "inject the normally dreary precinct of a shopping mall with a shot of adrenaline". In 2013, USA Today named it among the most "amazing luxury malls" in the U.S.

Like other buildings at CityCenter, Crystals was designed to be environmentally friendly, with features including skylights, reclaimed wood, and efficient water fixtures. In October 2009, it was awarded LEED Gold Core & Shell certification from the U.S. Green Building Council, making it the largest retail district in the world to achieve such a feat.

== Features ==
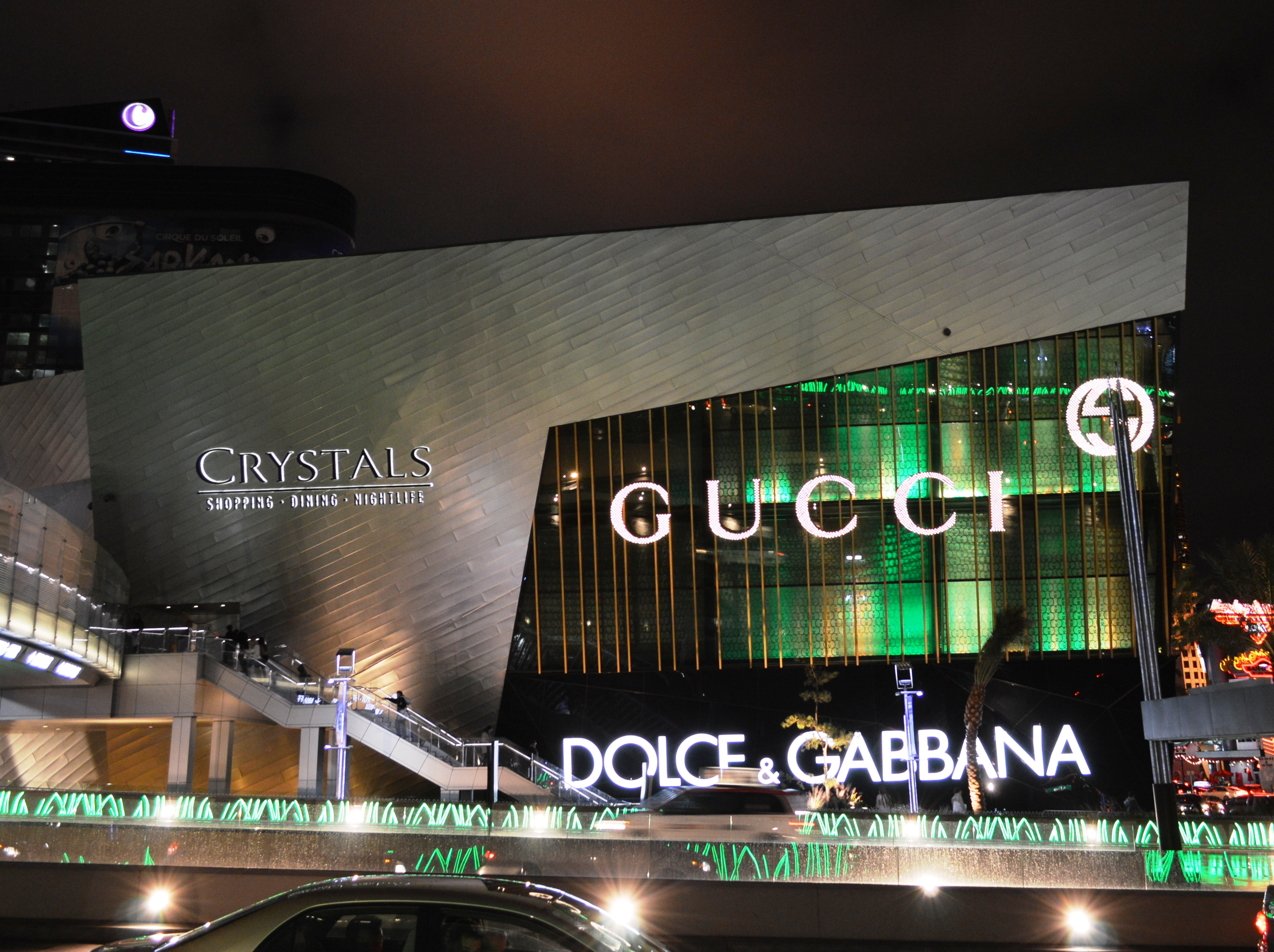
Exterior of Gucci and Dolce & Gabbana stores at Crystals

Crystals features 500,000 sq ft (46,000 m^{2}) of space, and has 57 tenants, including retailers and restaurants. It opened with 23 tenants, and more were added throughout 2010. Some retailers had delayed their openings due to poor economic conditions, and others dropped out altogether. The mall targets a wealthy clientele and is known for its luxury stores.

Notable retailers at the time of opening included Dior, Hermès, Prada, Tiffany & Co., Assouline Publishing, and De Grisogono. Thirteen retailers made their Las Vegas debut with the opening of Crystals, including Miu Miu, Paul Smith, Porsche Design, and Tom Ford. Crystals includes the largest Louis Vuitton store in North America, with a three-story facility measuring 14,000 sq ft (1,300 m^{2}). Assouline and De Grisogono closed in 2013, and several new retailers opened later that year, including Loro Piana, Richard Mille, Rimowa, and Valentino.

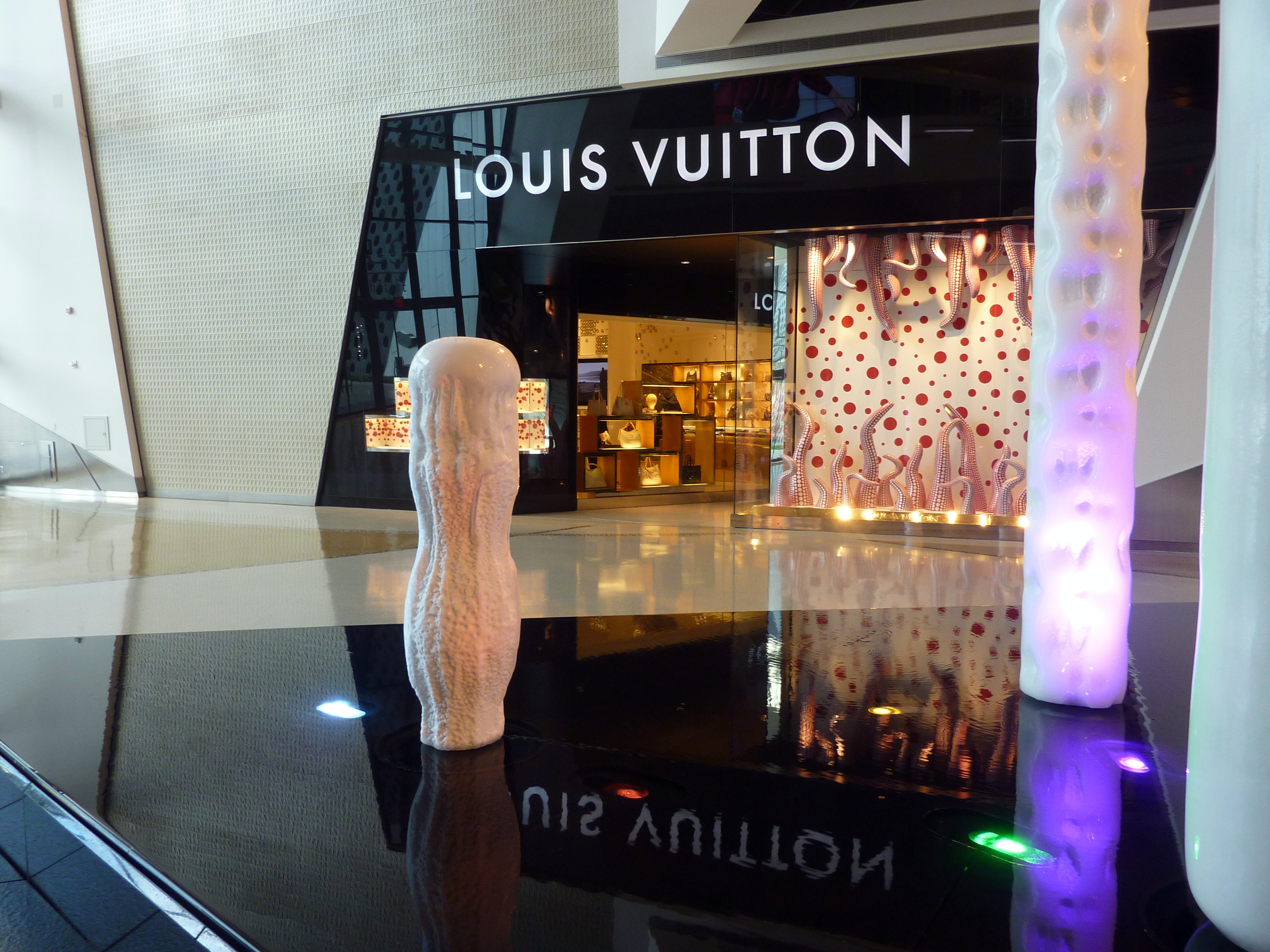
Glacia ice attraction

The mall includes water and ice attractions designed by WET. Halo consists of clear cylinders filled with water, which is manipulated by high-speed motors to produce vortices accompanied by colored lighting. Glacia consists of ice columns rising up to 15 feet. Rods within the columns can heat or cool the ice to create unique carvings. The columns are illuminated by light, and the attraction is accompanied by a tone poem from Mickey Hart.

Crystals opened a Princess Diana exhibit in 2022, marking the 25th anniversary of her death. Princess Diana: A Tribute Exhibition covers 10,000 sq ft (930 m^{2}) and features numerous personal items that belonged to her.

=== Restaurants ===
Crystals opened with several restaurants, including Mastro's Ocean Club, a steak and seafood restaurant which includes dining space in the mall's treehouse. Other restaurants included Brasserie Puck, a French restaurant by chef Wolfgang Puck. The Pods, also by Puck, offered coffee and snacks. Brasserie failed to meet expectations and was replaced by a new Italian restaurant from Puck called Cucina, opened in June 2010. An Asian restaurant, Social House, opened in 2010, and operated for five years.

Chef Todd English and actress Eva Longoria partnered to create a space which operated as a restaurant and nightclub, known respectively as Beso and Eve. The business opened with Crystals, and filed for Chapter 11 bankruptcy in 2011, following financial problems and litigation with investors. Later that year, Landry's agreed to purchase the restaurant and now-closed nightclub. The combined business had owed more than $3 million in back rent to MGM. Despite this, MGM stood by Longoria in her battle with investors, viewing her involvement as an asset to the business. In 2012, Landry's closed Beso for remodeling and reopened it as She, a female-oriented steakhouse with a nightclub. Longoria retained an ownership stake in the new business. The nightclub closed in early 2013, and Landry's closed She in May 2014.

Chef English also opened a bar and restaurant, known as Todd English P.U.B., in 2010. He departed the property in 2017, and his bar was renamed simply The Pub. It was replaced in 2022 by Toca Madera, a Mexican restaurant.

=== Art ===
Upon opening, Crystals included art galleries by Dale Chihuly, Richard MacDonald, and Rodney Lough Jr. Several other artists have their work on display throughout Crystals, including Wook Jang Cheung, whose steel sculptures depict animals and reach up to 10 feet in height. In 2010, MGM commissioned graffiti artist DAIM to create Left Attention, a 69-foot-long by 15-foot-high mural on the mall's third floor.

Akhob, an art installation by James Turrell, opened at the mall's Louis Vuitton store in 2013. Later that year, he designed a monorail station for Crystals. In 2015, Tatsuo Miyajima unveiled Hoto, an 18-foot mirror tower featuring more than 3,000 LED-lit numbers. Immersive Van Gogh, an interactive exhibit focused on the work of artist Vincent van Gogh, was showcased on the mall's entire third floor during 2021.

== Gallery ==
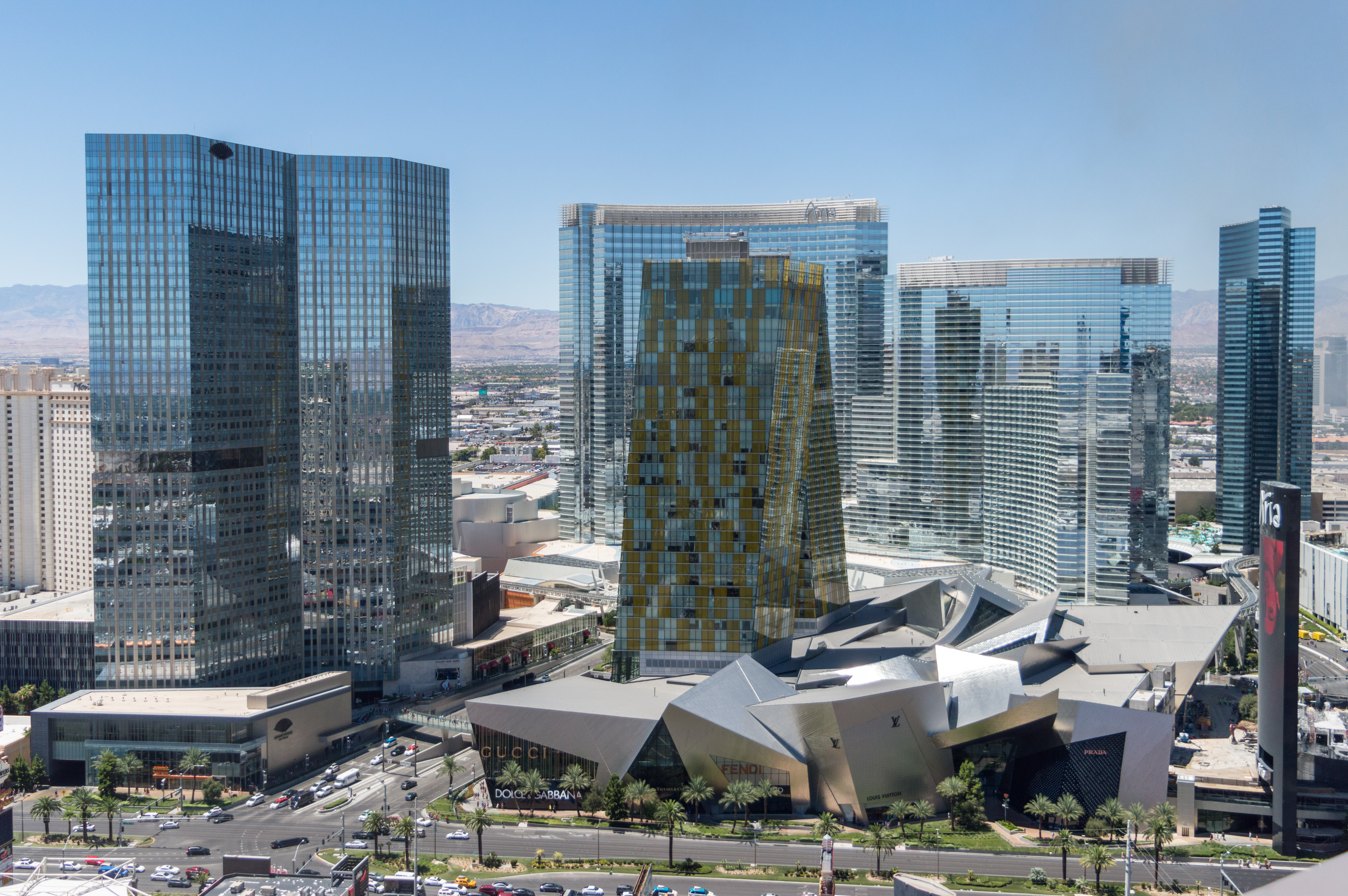
Crystals, seen at the base of CityCenter

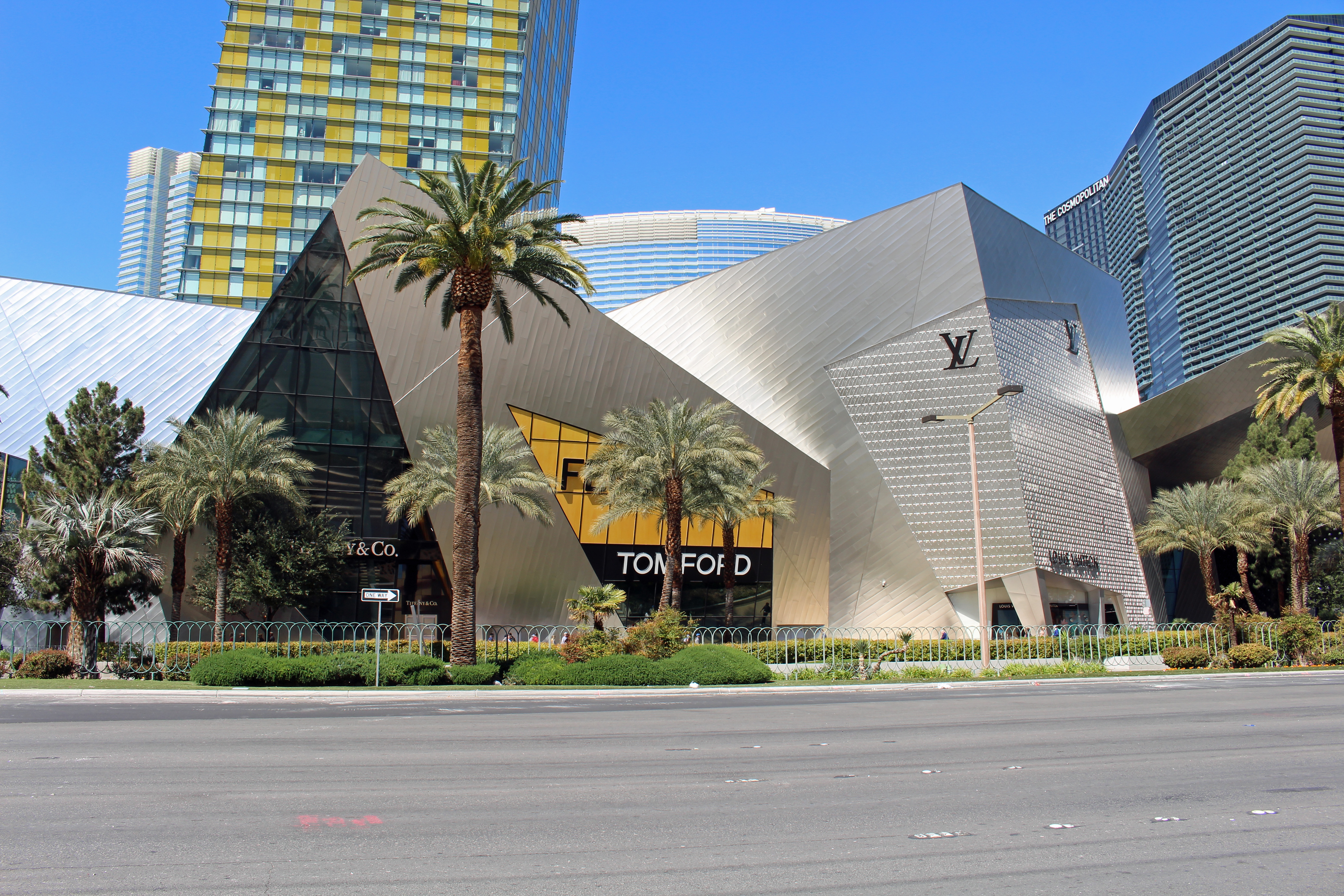
Exterior view along the Strip

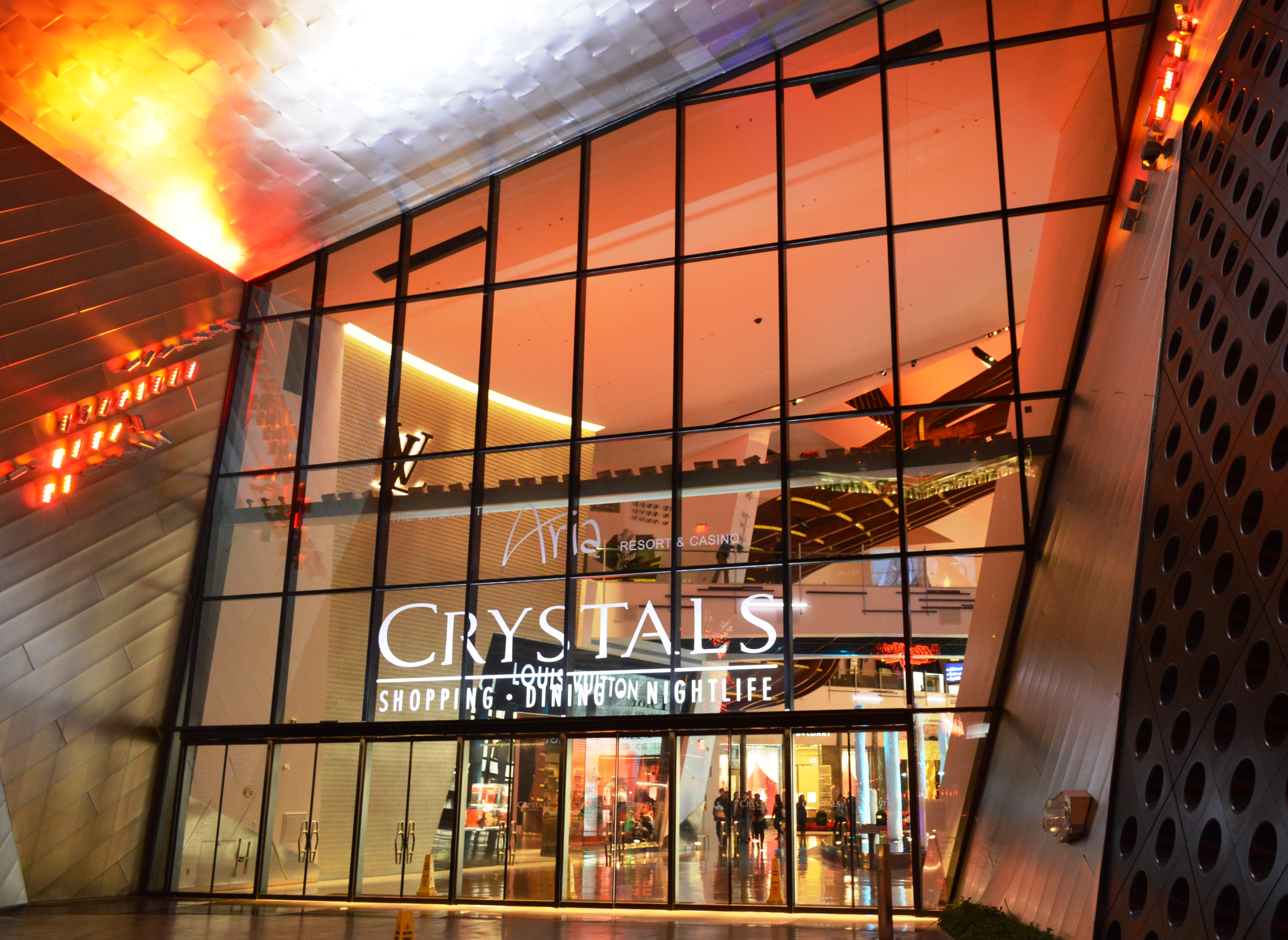
One of the mall entrances

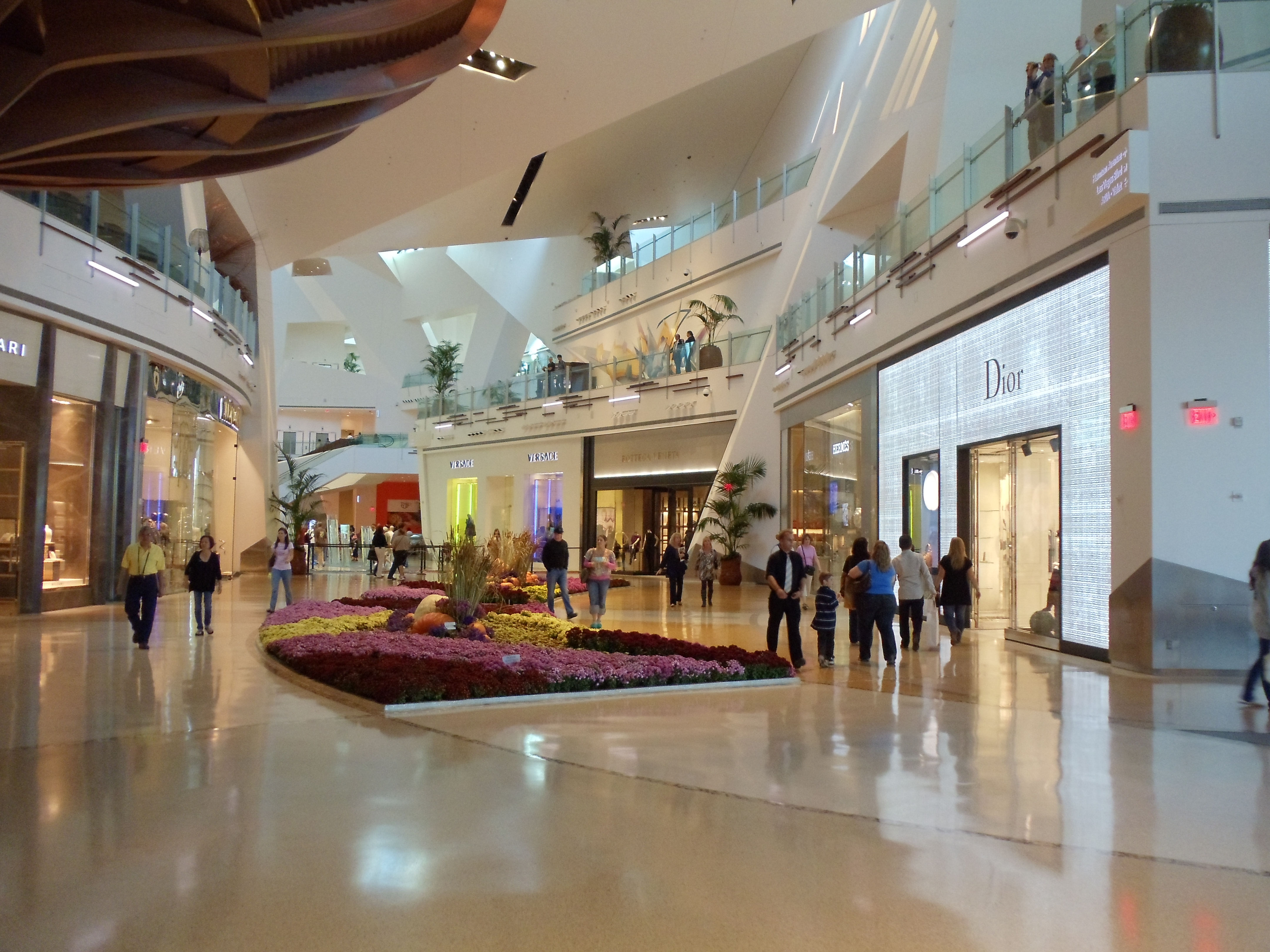
Ground floor

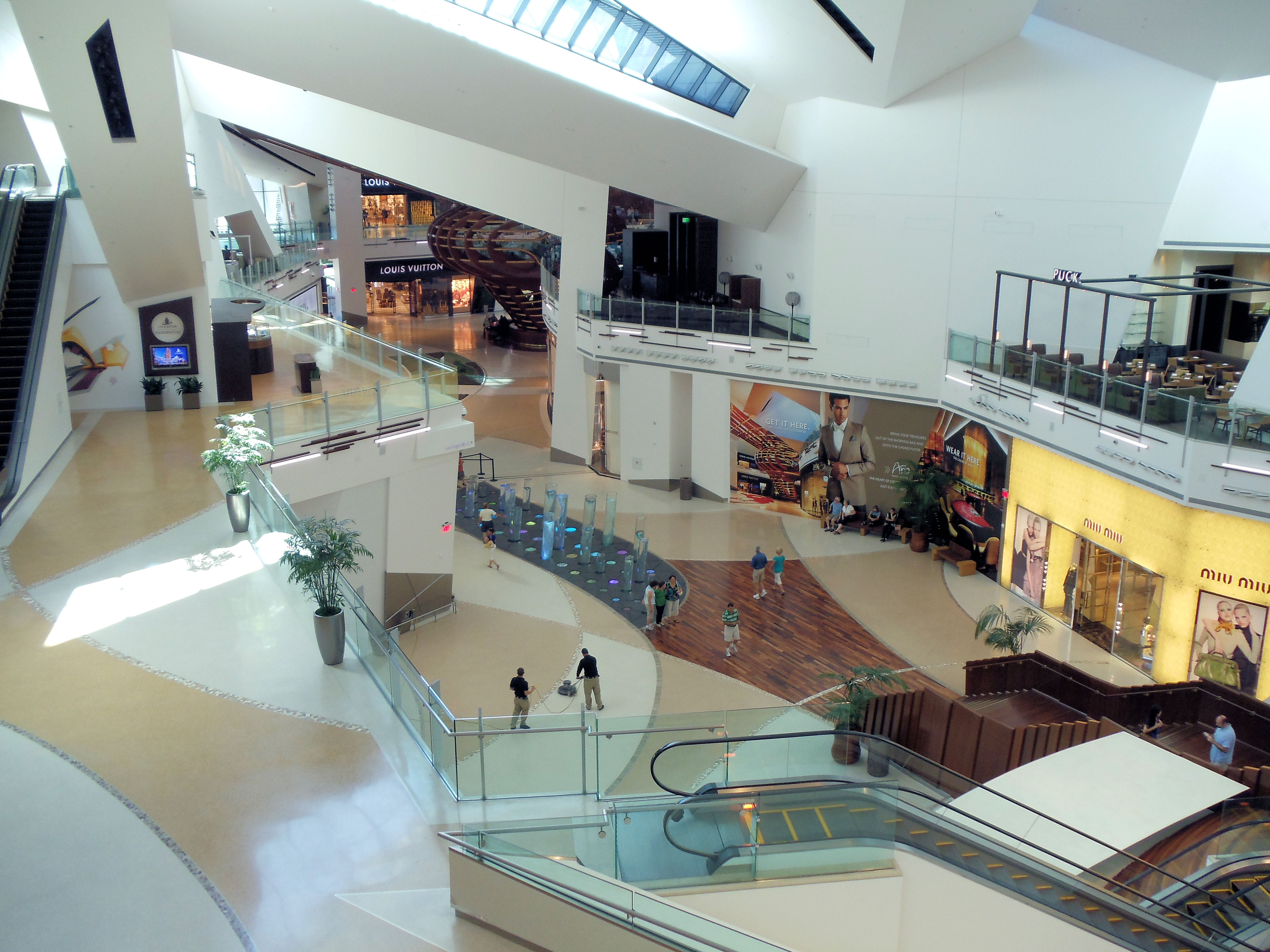
Overlooking the mall interior

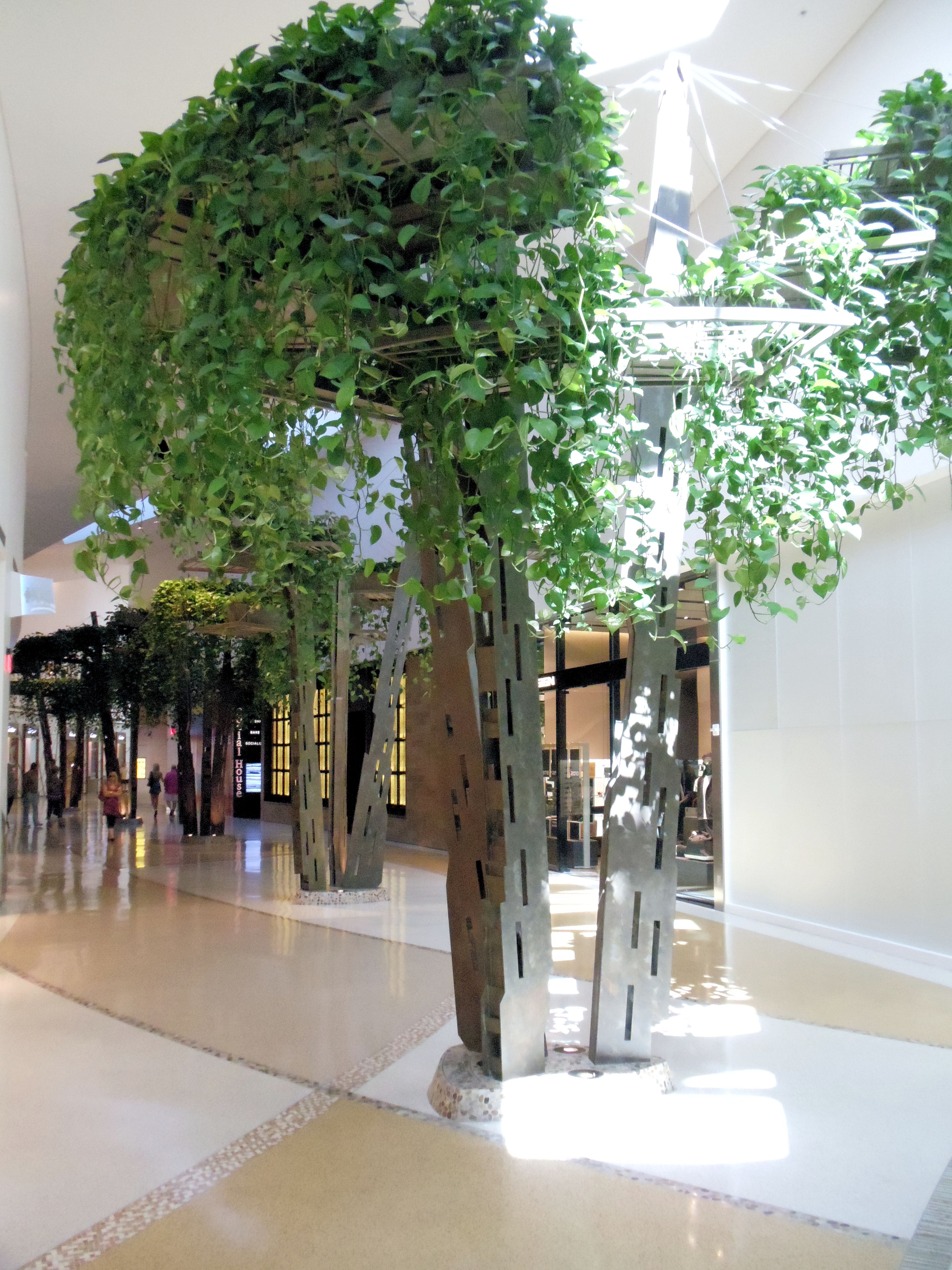
Shopping corridor

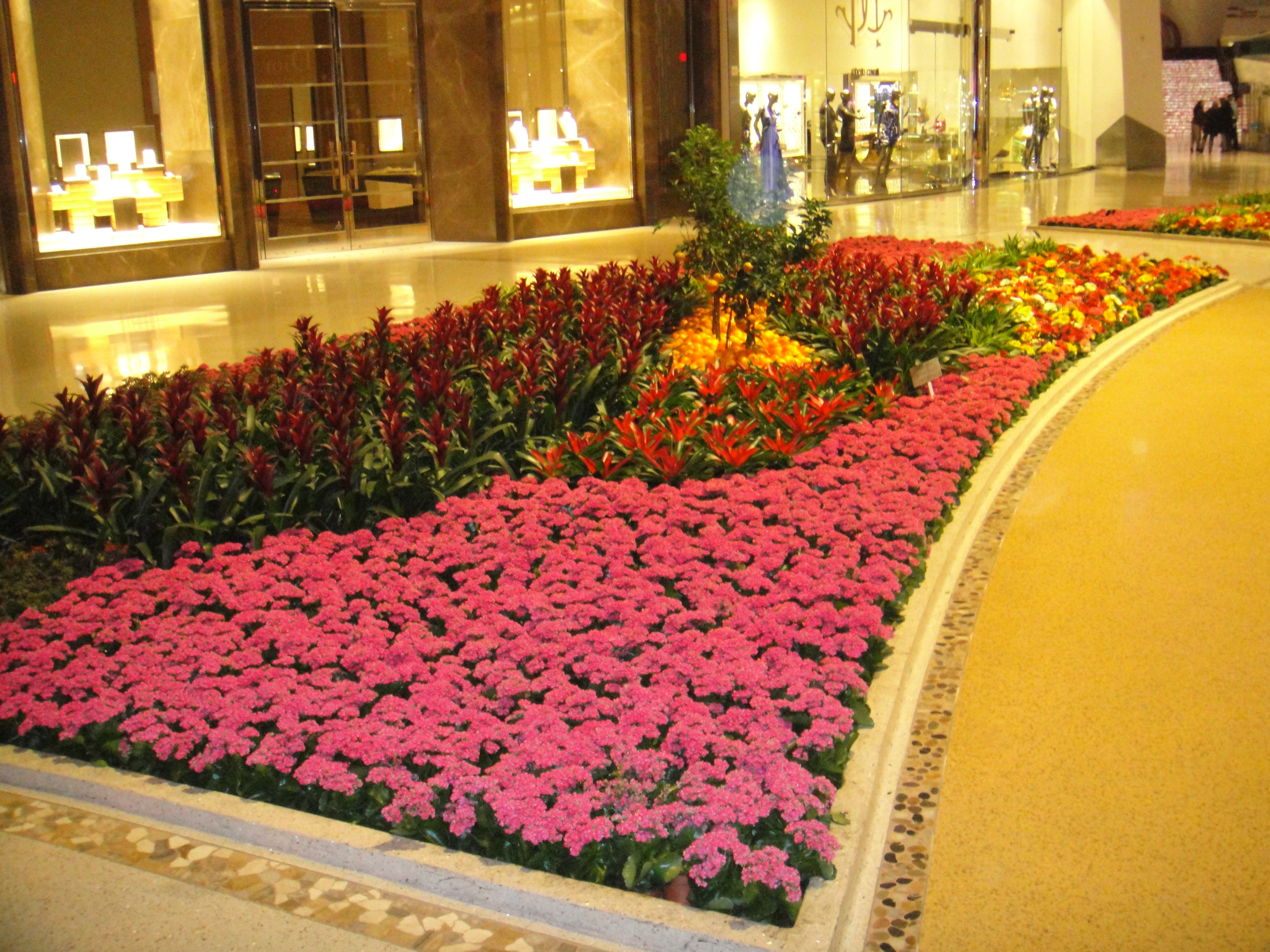
Flower arrangements inside the mall

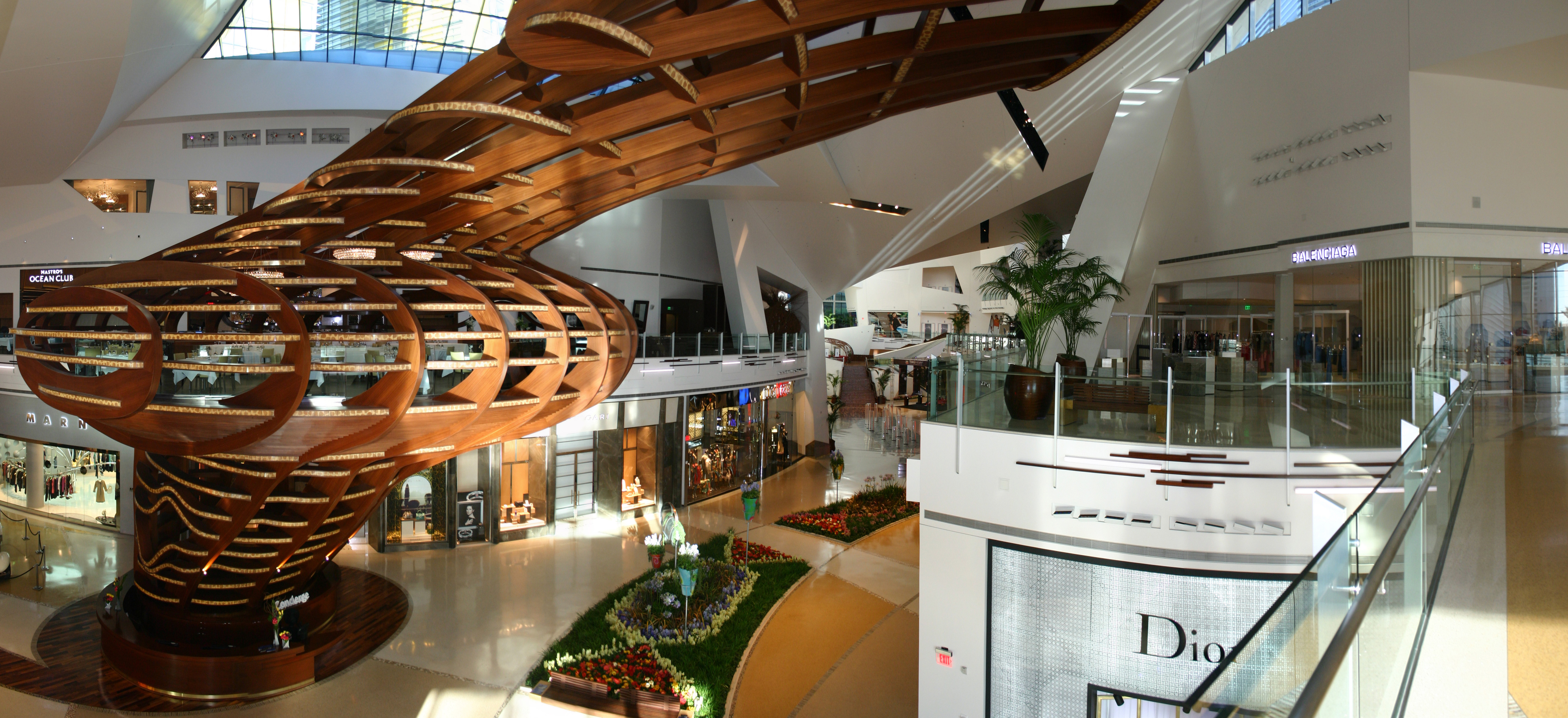
The mall's treehouse structure

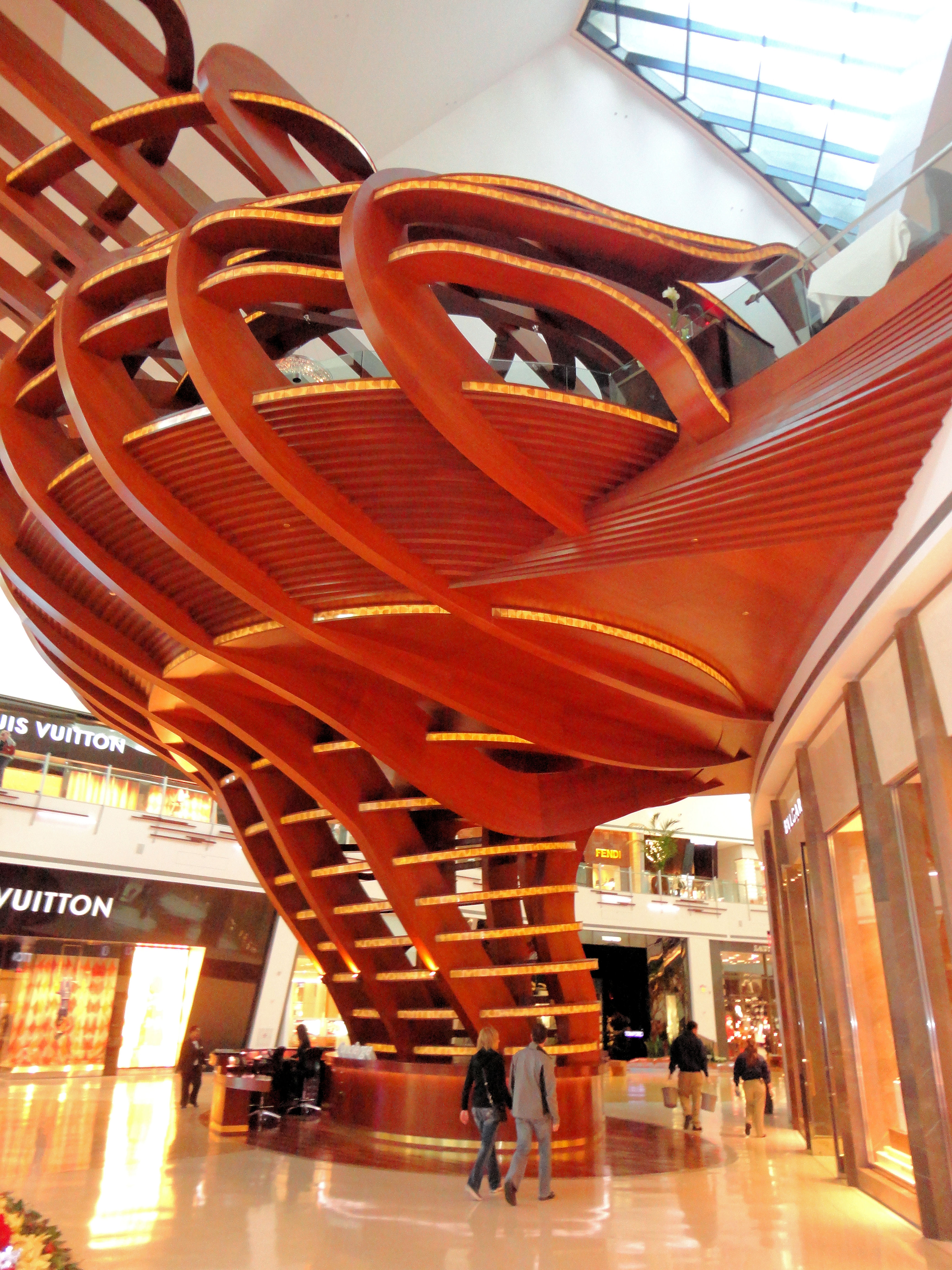
Treehouse from the ground floor

== See also ==
- 63, another shopping complex at CityCenter
