= One America =

One America may refer to:

- One America Appeal, an American nonprofit organization
- One America Committee, a political action committee founded by American politician John Edwards
- One America Initiative, a U.S. Presidential initiative
- One America News Network, an American right-wing pay television news channel
- One America Plaza, a building in San Diego, California

== See also ==
- Two Americas
