= Michigan City Public Library =

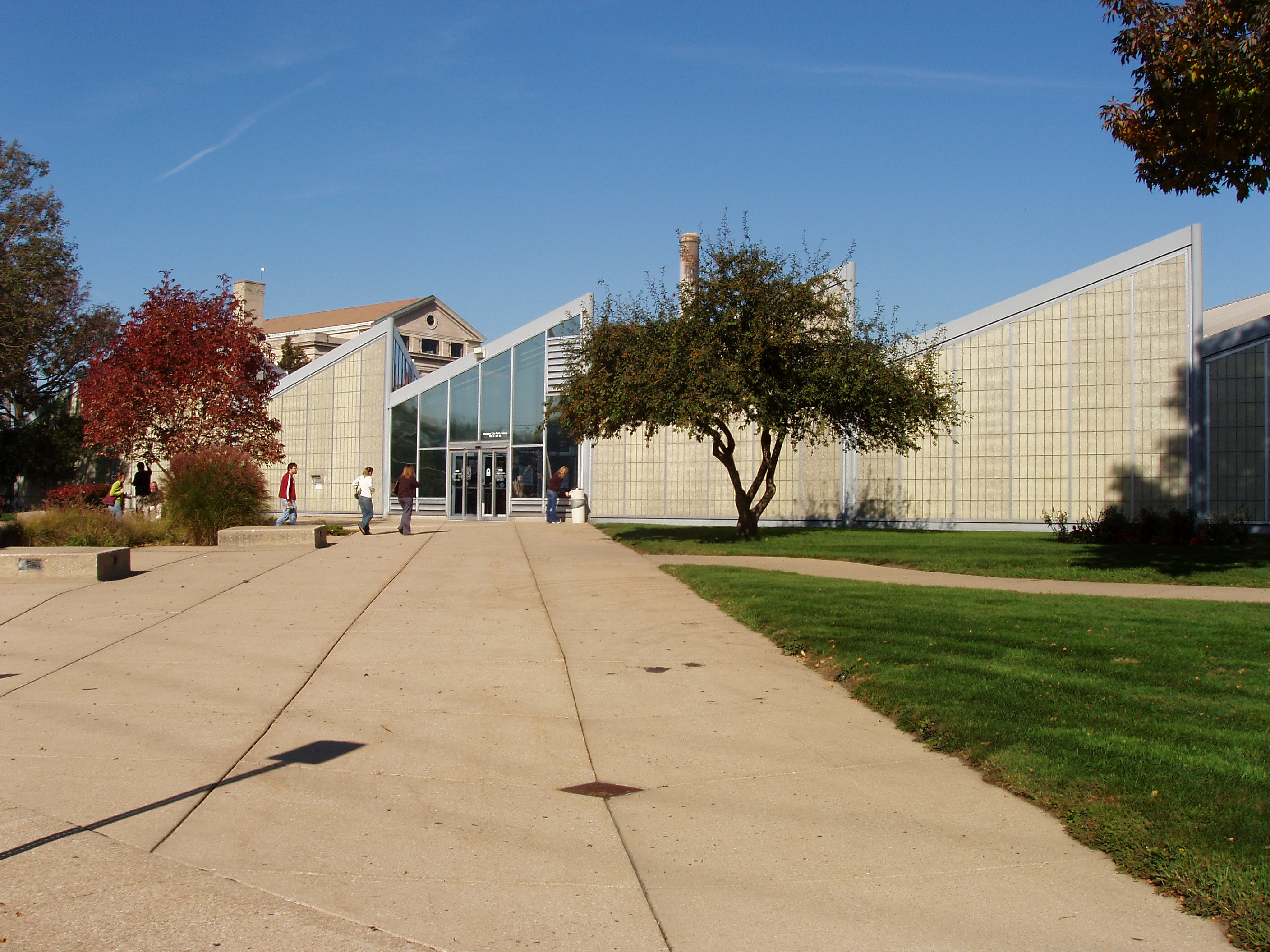
- Interactive map of the Michigan City Public Library area

General information
- Status: Completed
- Type: Public Library
- Architectural style: Modernism
- Location: 100 E 4th Street; Michigan City, Indiana, United States
- Coordinates: 41.718635°N 86.90238°W
- Construction started: 1974
- Completed: 1977

Technical details
- Floor count: 1
- Floor area: 35,000 sq ft (3,300 m^{2})

Design and construction
- Architects: Helmut Jahn, (C.F.Murphy Architects)

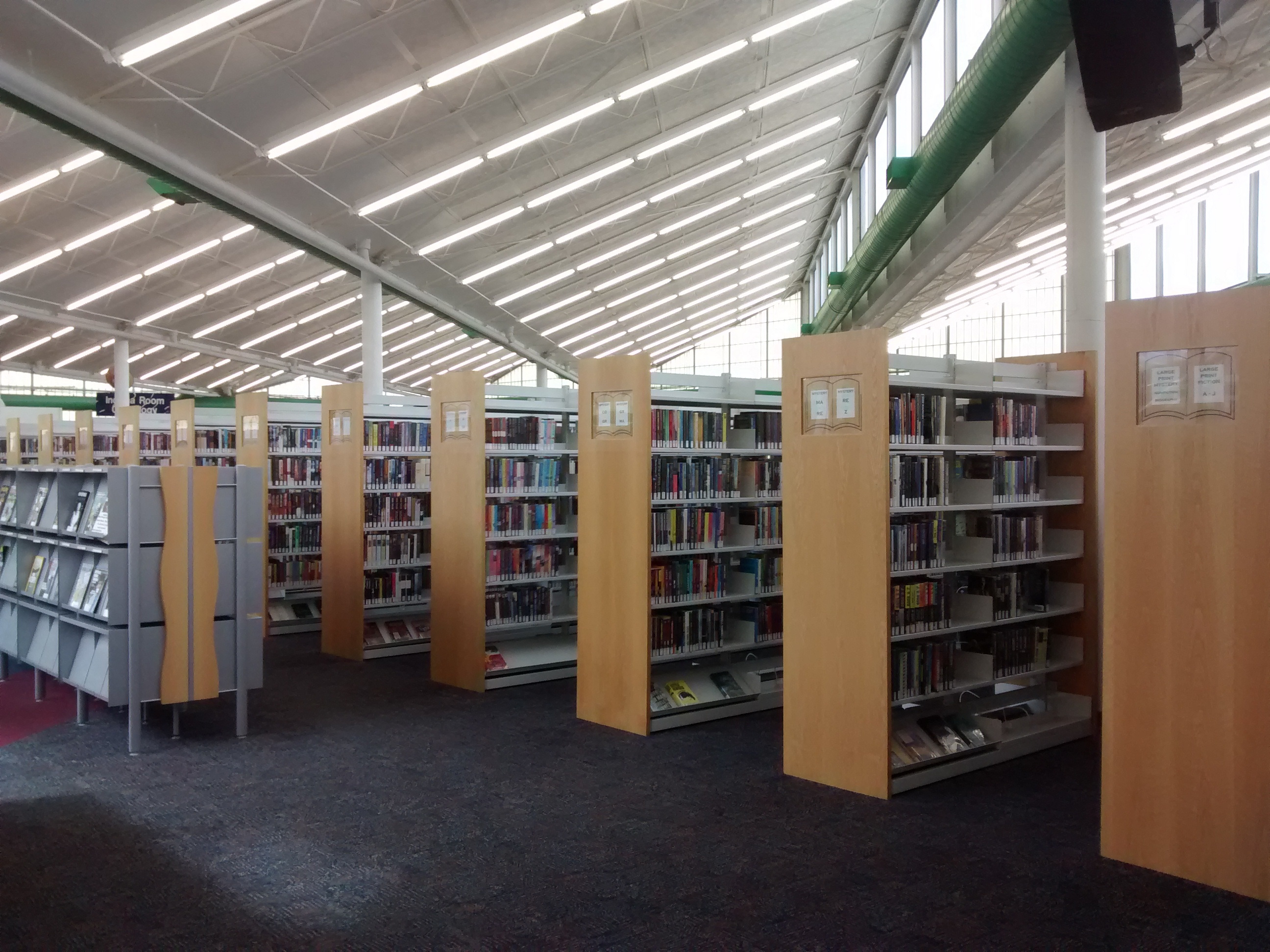
Interior

The Michigan City Public Library is a 35,000-square-foot (3,300 m^{2}) one level facility located in Michigan City, Indiana. It was designed by the world-renowned architect Helmut Jahn. Jahn designed the building while working for the Chicago architecture firm C.F. Murphy, which later would become Jahn Architects. The design began in 1974 and the construction was completed in 1977.

== Building design ==
The exterior walls are constructed out of translucent fiberglass, which allows diffused daylight to enter during the day and creates a soft glow outside at night. These translucent exterior walls do not permit outward views but rather directs attention inward toward an exterior courtyard in the center of the building. The landscaped courtyard provides an outdoor space for reading and various activates for the library visitors. Inside the courtyard, there is a sculpture designed by artist Thomas Scarff, Centura. The sawtoothed roof profile incorporates long clearstory windows that collect soft northern daylight and shields the direct southern sunlight. The exterior façade expresses the structural pipe columns and sawtooth roof structure. Originally the exposed steel structure was painted white, but have since then been painted grey.

The main entrance originally featured a covered recessed entrance with one of the clearstory windows continuing through exterior space to the edge of the building, expressing the buildings transparency and structure at the entrance. Later the recessed entrance was enclosed to provide a vestibule. This helps to prevent blasts of cold winter air in the winter but it flattened the façade and negatively changed the character of the entrance. Inside all of the ceiling and roof elements, including suspended lights, and exposed colorfully painted ductwork is arranged along the diagonal clearstory structural grid, while all of the walls and furnishings are organized orthogonally, relating to the building envelope. The interior space is open and flexible. Administrative offices have low partitions near the perimeter and the only full-height walls are for meeting spaces and building services. The original interiors had warm striped yellow and gold carpeting with blue upholstered seating, which was later replaced. The exposed white ceilings with exposed white structural steel and green ductwork painted ductwork remain as originally designed.

== Awards ==
- Illinois Council of the American Institute of Architects 1977 State Design Honor Award
- Chicago Chapter of the American Institute of Architects 1977 Distinguished Building Award
- American Institute of Steel Construction, Inc. 1979 Architectural Award of Excellence
