= Weser Tower =

Multistorey building in Bremen, Germany

Coordinates: 53°05′00″N 08°47′13″E

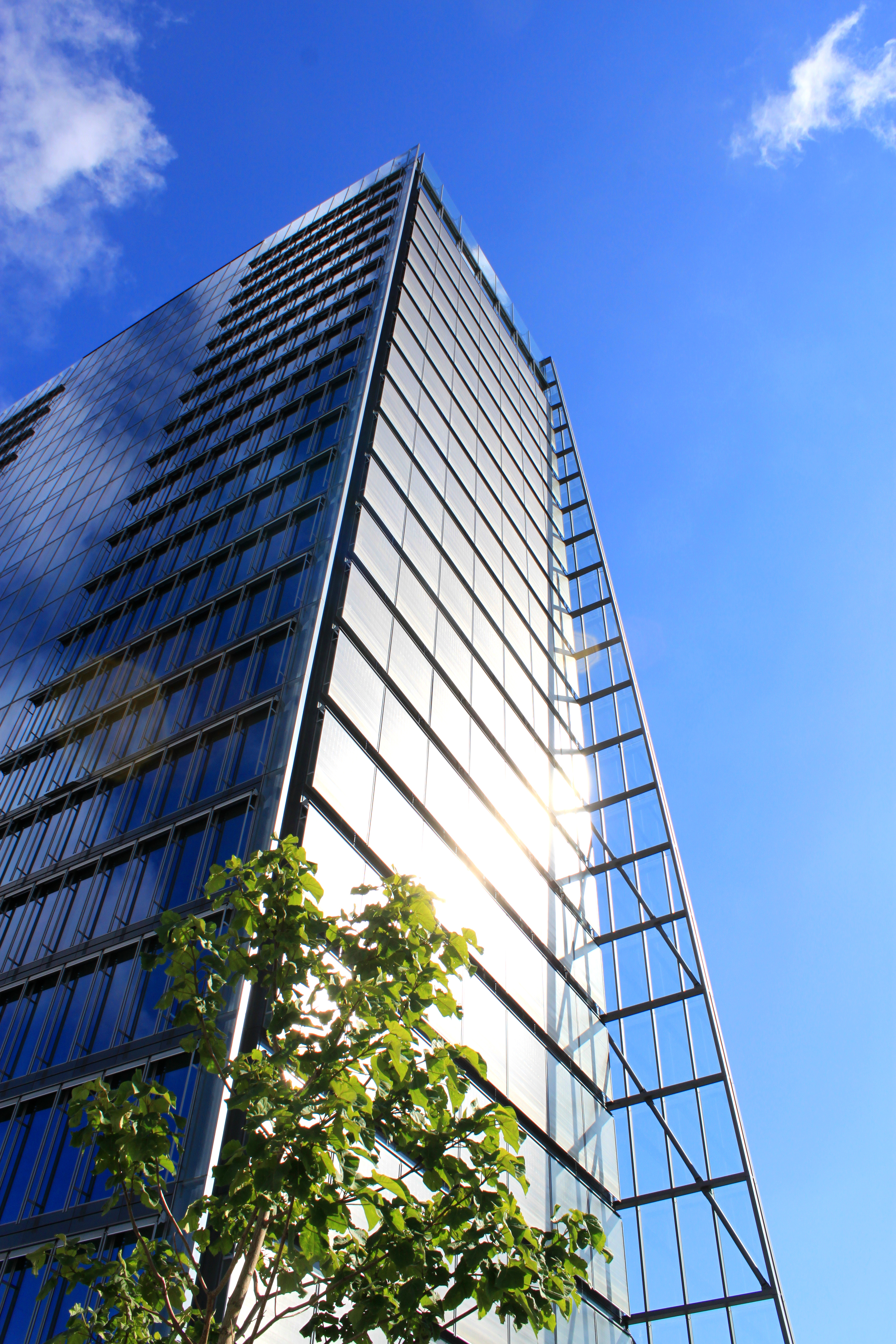
Weser Tower skyscraper

The Weser Tower is a multistorey building in Bremen.

== Tower ==
It was designed by the American architect of German origin Helmut Jahn. The laying of the foundation was on 23 October 2007. The Tower of 82 metres height is the tallest office building of Bremen and was completed in 2010.

The 22 floors of the building have a surface of 18,000 square metres and thus place for 800 jobs. Among this large-scale project rank also a new hotel, a Varieté theatre, restaurants and further office buildings. Principal tenant are subsidiary companies of the power supplier EWE AG, which takes over all together 13 floors of the building.
