= 1000M =

Condominium building in Chicago, Illinois

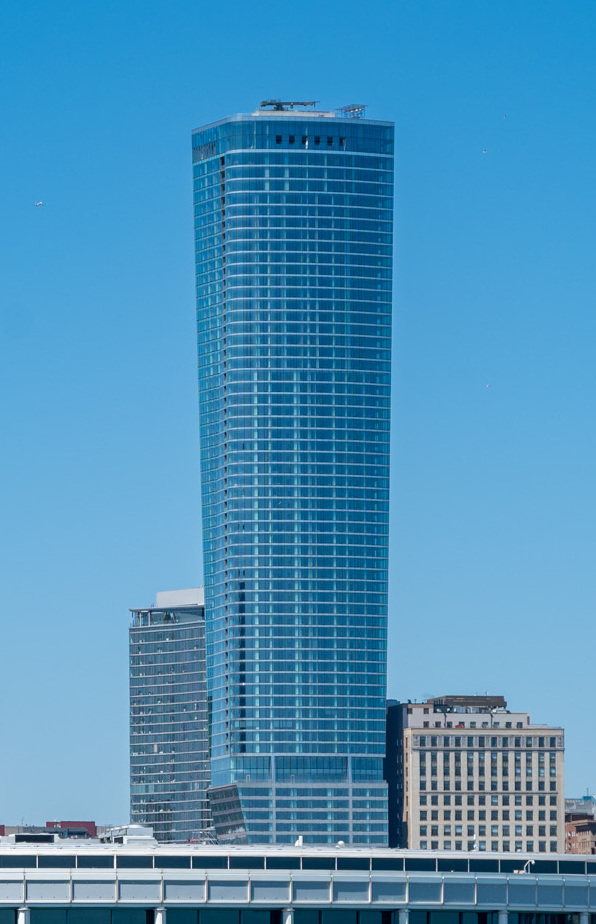
- 1000M in April 2024
- Interactive map of the 1000M area
- Alternative names: 1000 South Michigan

General information
- Status: Topped-out
- Type: Apartment Complex
- Location: Historic Michigan Boulevard District in the Chicago Loop, 1000 South Michigan Avenue, Chicago, IL 60605
- Coordinates: 41°52′11.7″N 87°37′28.5″W
- Construction started: December 2021
- Estimated completion: Late 2024 / Early 2025
- Management: JK Equities, Time Equities and Oak Capitals

Height
- Roof: 805 feet (245.4 m)

Technical details
- Floor count: 74

Design and construction
- Architect: Helmut Jahn
- Main contractor: James McHugh Construction

Website
- 1000mchicago.com

1000M is an apartment complex in the Historic Michigan Boulevard District portion of Michigan Avenue in the Chicago Loop. Designed by Helmut Jahn and Kara Mann, the building is a 73-story, 832-foot (253.6 m) tall tower located at 1000 South Michigan Avenue.

Construction on 1000M began in December 2019 but was halted for a time due to the COVID-19 pandemic. It ultimately opened in June 2024. The building was the final project designed by Jahn.

== History ==
Construction was temporarily halted due to the COVID-19 pandemic. It began again in late 2021/early 2022. The building officially opened in June 2024.

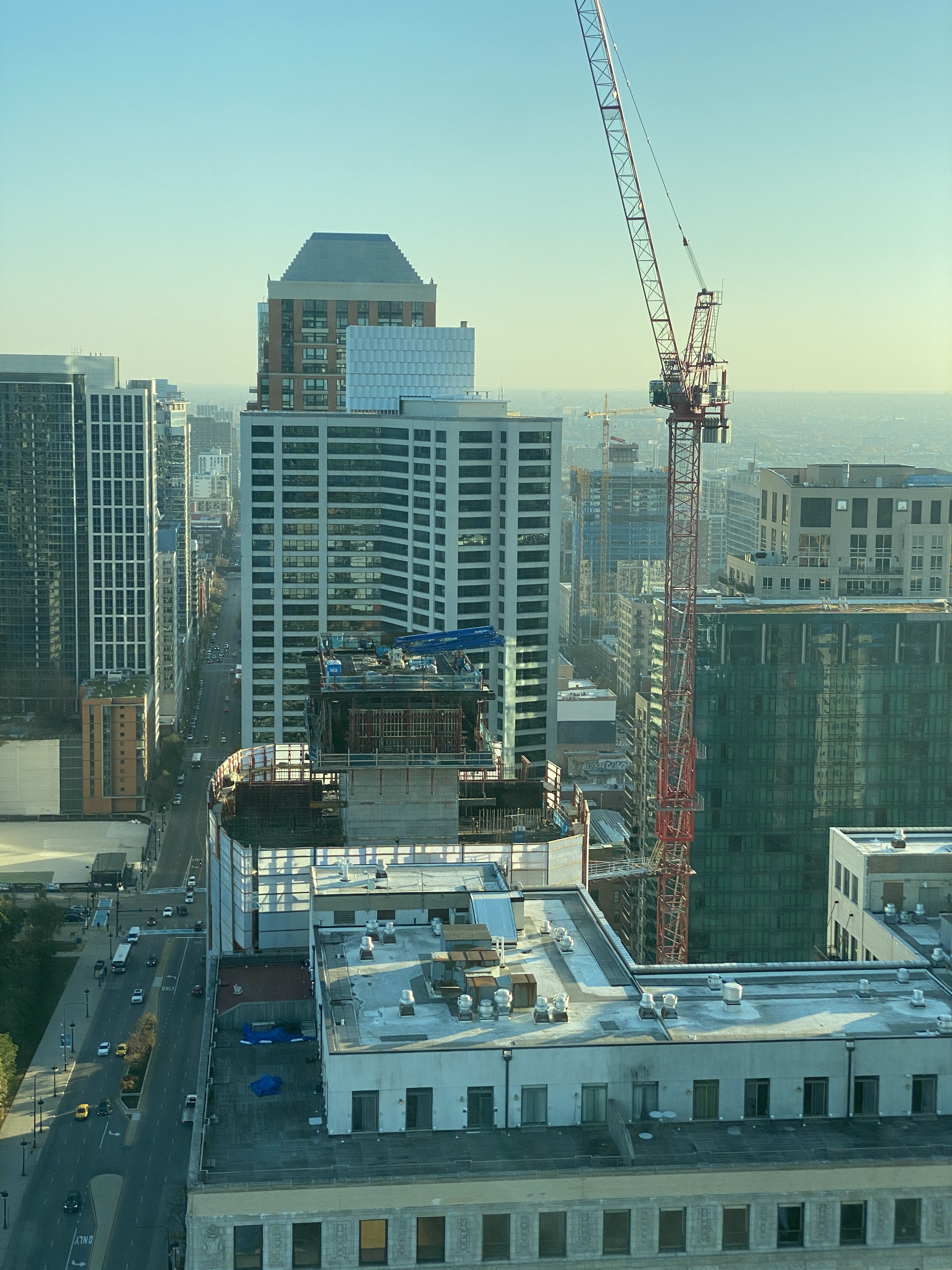
1000M construction rooftop, November 2022, from 808 South Michigan

== Ownership ==
The building is a joint venture between New York-based firms JK Equities and Time Equities, and Oak Capital.

== Architecture ==
Helmut Jahn was the lead architect on the project. The tower is largely composed of glass with aluminum horizontal spandrels flanking each floor. The tower is capped with a 2-story east facing amenity space including a protected terrace with views toward Lake Michigan.

=== Interior design ===
Kara Mann, of Kara Mann Design, designed the interiors of the building, including the outdoor and amenity spaces to have "a purity and lightness."

=== Previous building designs ===
Plans for the building were released in August 2015. Although the historic district zoning has height restrictions of 425 feet (129.5m), on September 23, 2015, the City Clerk of Chicago's website posted that the building was planned to have a rooftop terrace reaching 1,030 feet (313.9 m). Blair Kamin of the Chicago Tribune later wrote that plans called for a 1,001-foot (305.1 m) tower. Eventually, the building was redesigned to stand 832 feet (253.6 m). The plan was approved on April 22, 2016. Instead of the more common setback architectural design, the original building would have had overhangs on its south face with successively larger rising cubes that Blair Kamin referred to as presenting a "striking, if somewhat precarious, effect".

The early designs for the building included an 85th-floor roof deck for condo residents. The property, which overlooks Grant Park, had been owned by Warren Barr who had plans for a 40-story condominium tower until he lost ownership through foreclosure to First American Bank in a July 2010 proceeding that saw the property sell for $11.3 million. If completed, the building will surpass the 430-foot (131.1 m) Metropolitan Tower at 310 South Michigan as the Historic Michigan Boulevard District's tallest structure. Even after redesigns reducing the building's height, it remained the tallest building along Michigan Avenue across from Grant Park.

=== Height ===
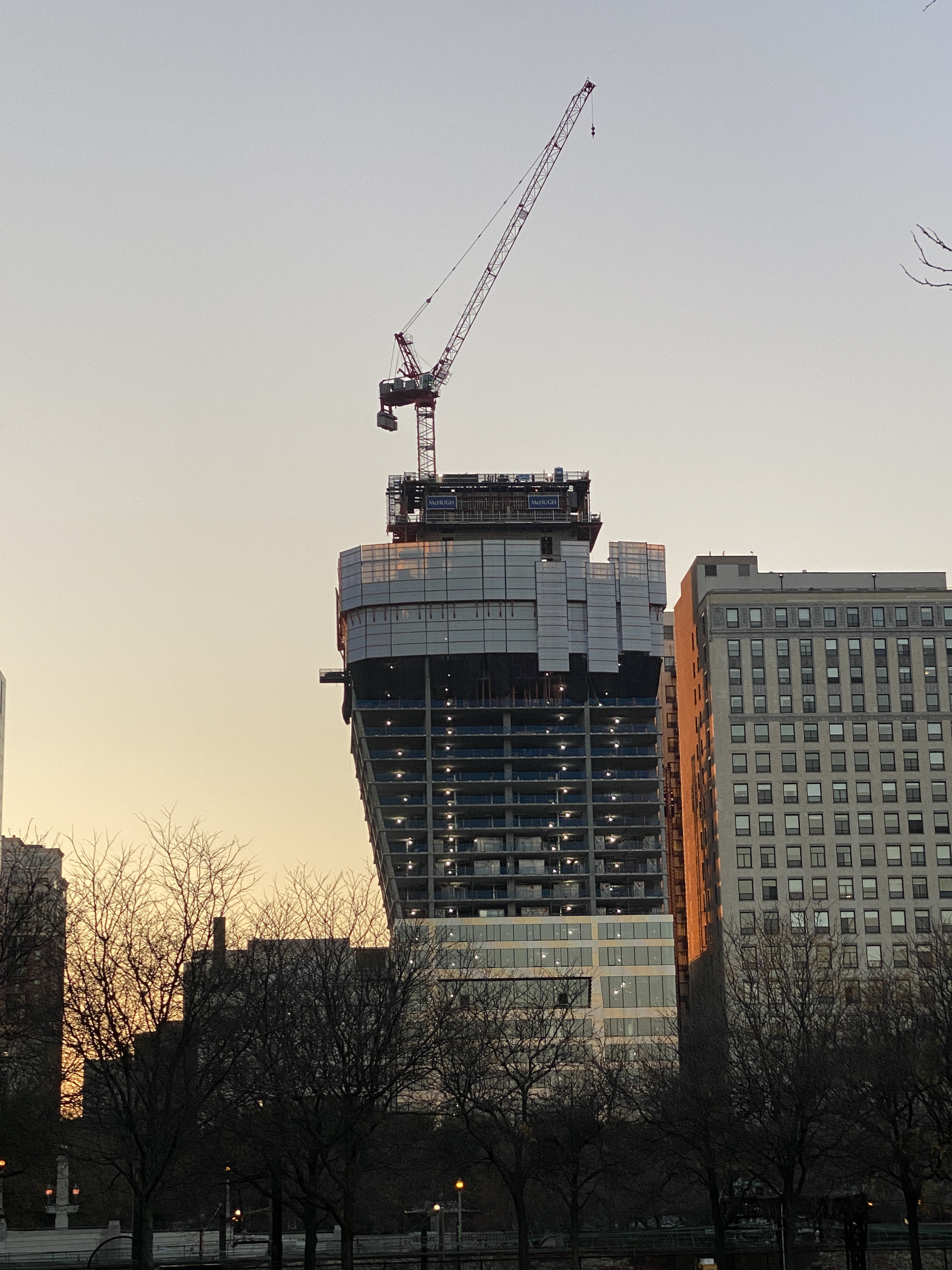
1000M, November 2022

The Commission on Chicago Landmarks has jurisdiction over the proposal due to its placement in the Historic District. In February 2016, The Landmark Commission considered formalizing a 900-foot (274.3 m) height restriction in the region of the historic district between 8th and 11th streets. Subsequently, the tower's height was scaled-back to 832 feet (253.6 m) and the building was redesigned to employ the current curving silhouette.

When completed, the building will surpassed the 430 feet (131.1 m) Metropolitan Tower at 310 South Michigan as the Historic Michigan Boulevard District's tallest structure. It will also become the tallest building in the city south of the Willis Tower. Even after the shorter redesign, the building retained the claim as the 13th tallest building in the City of Chicago.

== Usage ==
Residences include studios and penthouses. The building also contains 80,000 square feet of amenities, including a rooftop observation deck, a fitness center, and pools.

== See also ==
- List of tallest buildings in Chicago
- List of tallest buildings in the United States
