= Helmut Jahn =

German and American architect (1940–2021)

- Born: January 4, 1940; Zirndorf, Bavaria, Germany
- Died: May 8, 2021 (aged 81); Campton Hills, Illinois, U.S.
- Citizenship: Germany; United States
- Education: Technical University of Munich; Illinois Institute of Technology
- Occupation: Architect
- Website: jahn.studio

Helmut Jahn (January 4, 1940 – May 8, 2021) was a German and American architect, known for projects such as The Center Potsdamer Platz in Berlin, Germany; the Messeturm in Frankfurt, Germany; the James R. Thompson Center in Chicago; One Liberty Place in Philadelphia, Pennsylvania; and Suvarnabhumi Airport, in Bangkok, Thailand, among others.

His recent projects included 50 West Street, a residential tower in New York City in 2016; and the ThyssenKrupp Test Tower in Rottweil, Germany, in 2017. He was also behind 1000M in Chicago which began construction in 2019.

== Life and career ==
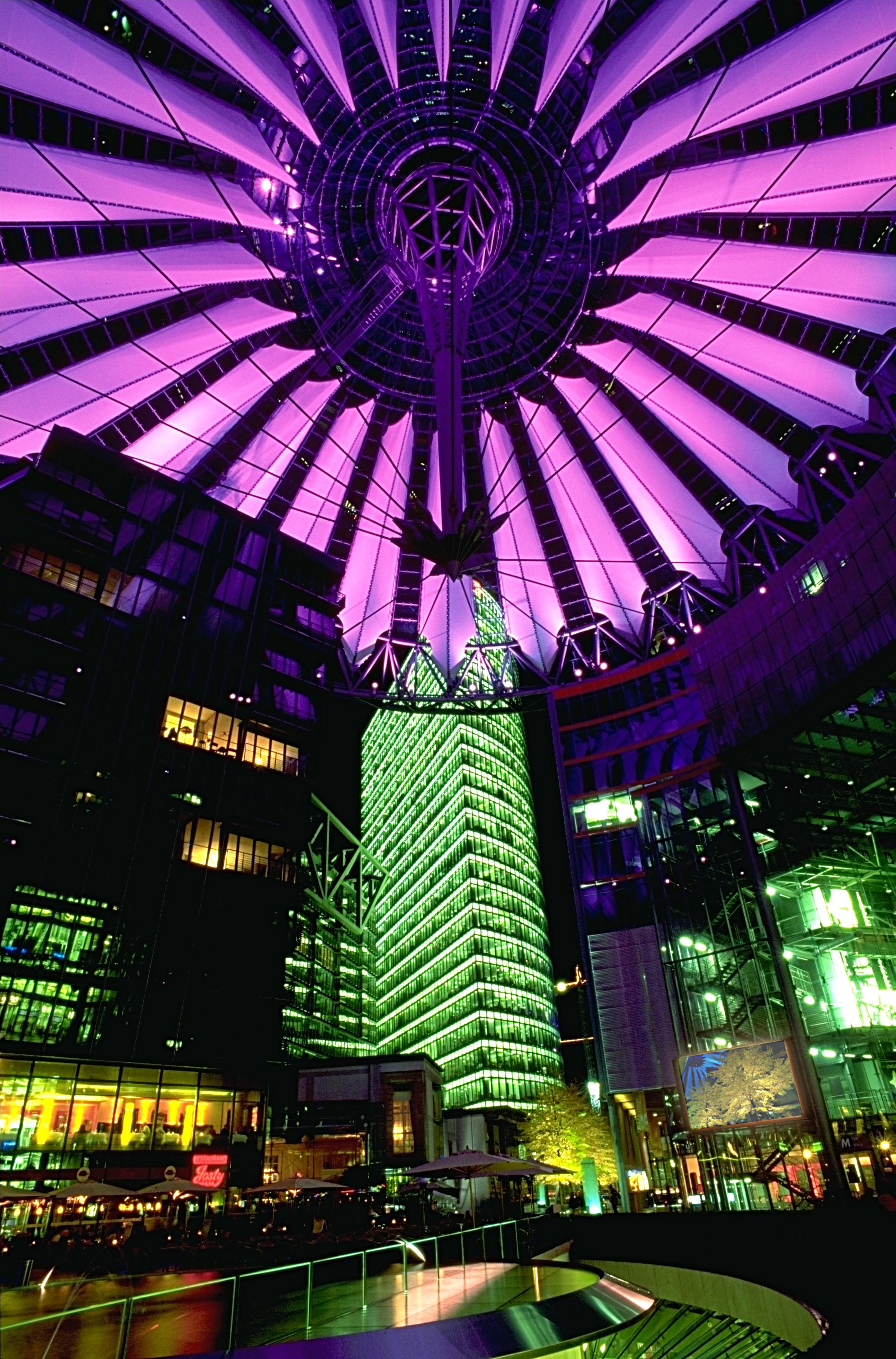
An illuminated, suspended, oval roof covers the 102 m span of the central Forum of the Sony Center, Berlin.

Jahn was born January 4, 1940, in Zirndorf, near Nuremberg, Germany. His father, Wilhelm Anton Jahn, was a schoolteacher in special education. His mother, Karolina Wirth, was a housewife. Jahn grew up watching the reconstruction of the city, which had been largely destroyed by Allied bombing campaigns.

He studied architecture at the Technical University of Munich from 1960 to 1965, and worked with Peter C. von Seidlein for a year after graduation. In 1966, he went to Chicago to further study architecture under Myron Goldsmith and Fazlur Khan at the Illinois Institute of Technology on a Rotary Scholarship, earning a Master's degree in 1967.

=== Murphy/Jahn ===
Jahn joined Charles Francis Murphy's architecture firm, C. F. Murphy Associates, in 1967 and was appointed Executive Vice President and Director of Planning and Design of the firm in 1973. He took sole control in 1981, renaming the firm Murphy/Jahn (even though Murphy had retired). Murphy died in 1985.

=== Death ===
Jahn was killed after being hit by two cars on May 8, 2021, while riding his bicycle in Campton Hills, a suburb of Chicago. The collision happened near his home and horse farm in St. Charles, Illinois, a Chicago suburb.

== Architectural style and influences ==
Generally inspired by Ludwig Mies van der Rohe, yet opposed to the doctrinal application of modernism by his followers, in 1978, Jahn became the eighth member of the Chicago Seven. His architectural style shifted from the modernism of the Miesian tradition to a postmodernist one with high-tech stylizations. Jahn established his reputation in 1985 with the State of Illinois Center in Chicago which prompted him to be dubbed "Flash Gordon". In addition to the main seat in Chicago, the company has offices in Berlin and Shanghai.

On October 26, 2012, Helmut Jahn renamed Murphy/Jahn to simply JAHN.

== Completed projects ==
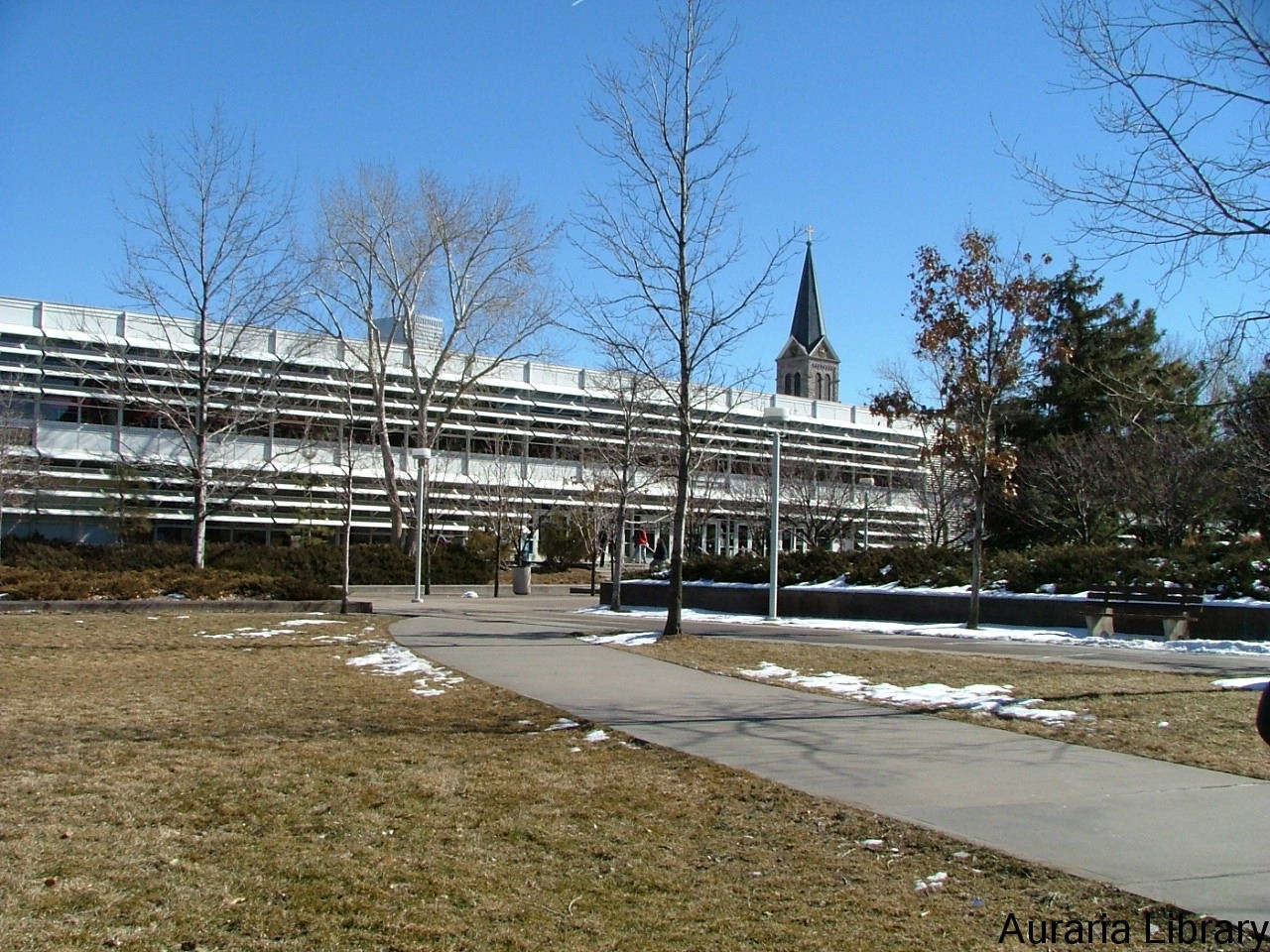
Auraria Library

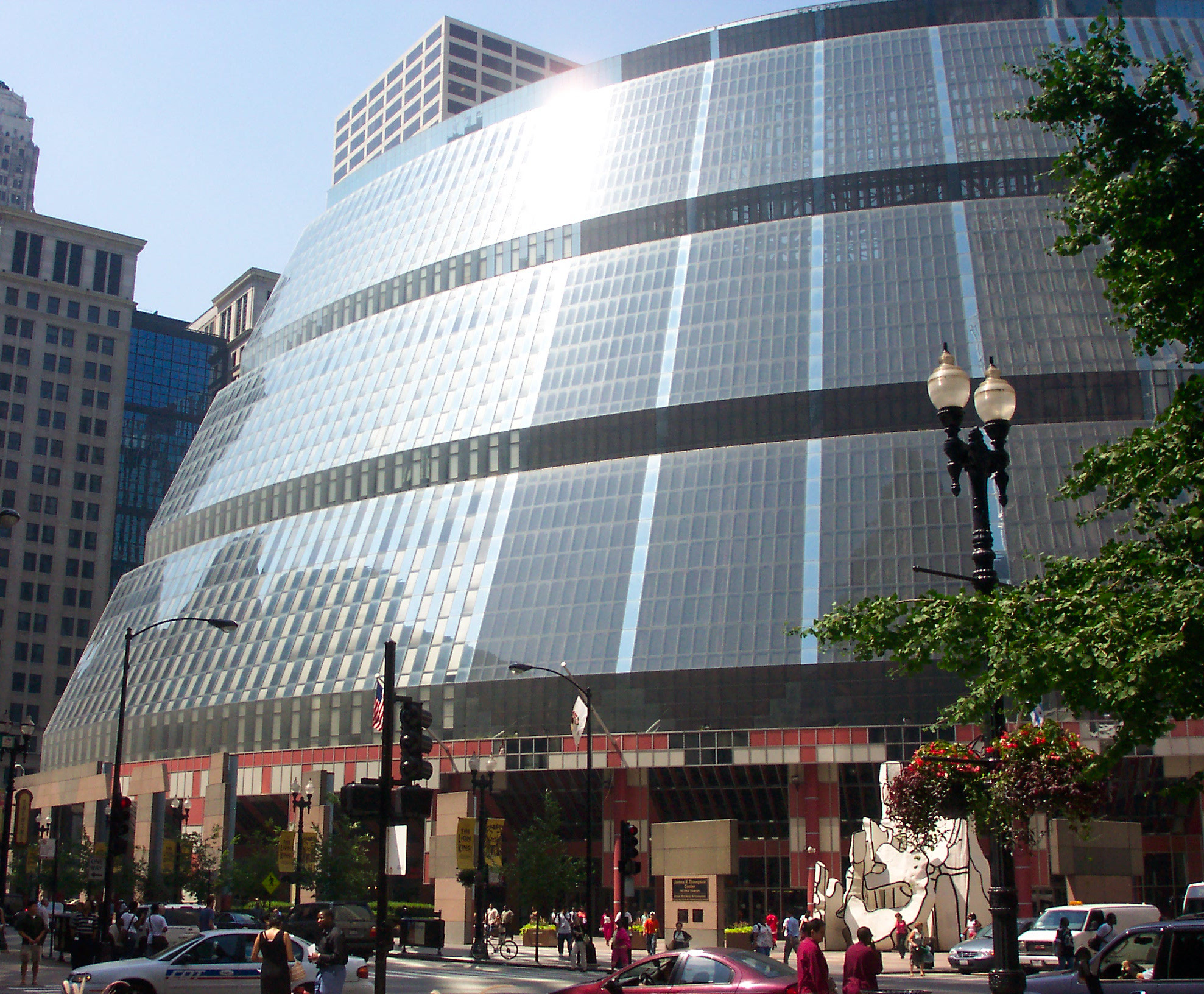
James R. Thompson Center

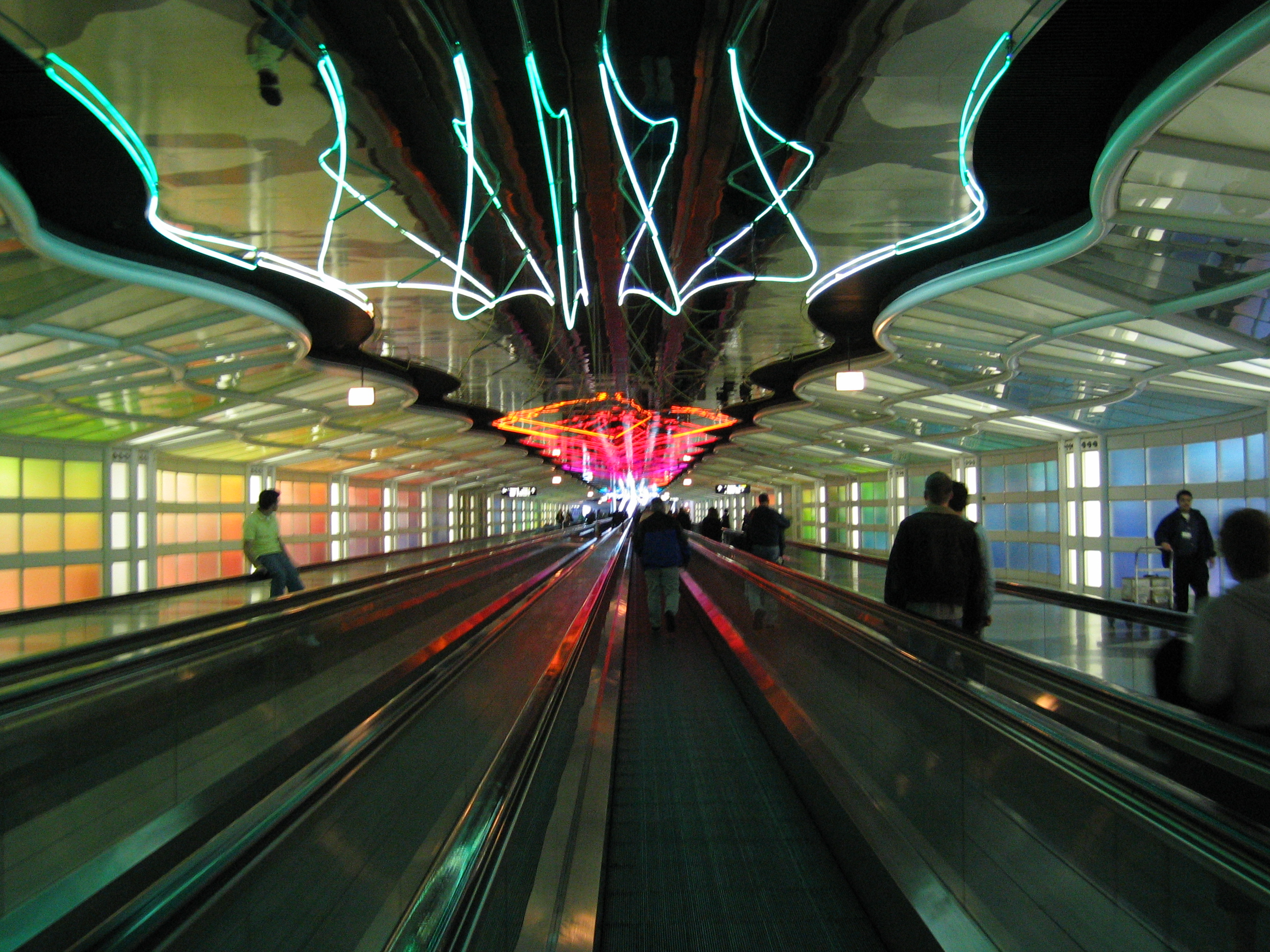
O'Hare International Airport, Chicago – interior view of the connecting tunnel between Concourses B & C of Terminal 1, with Michael Hayden's neon installation Sky's the Limit (1987).

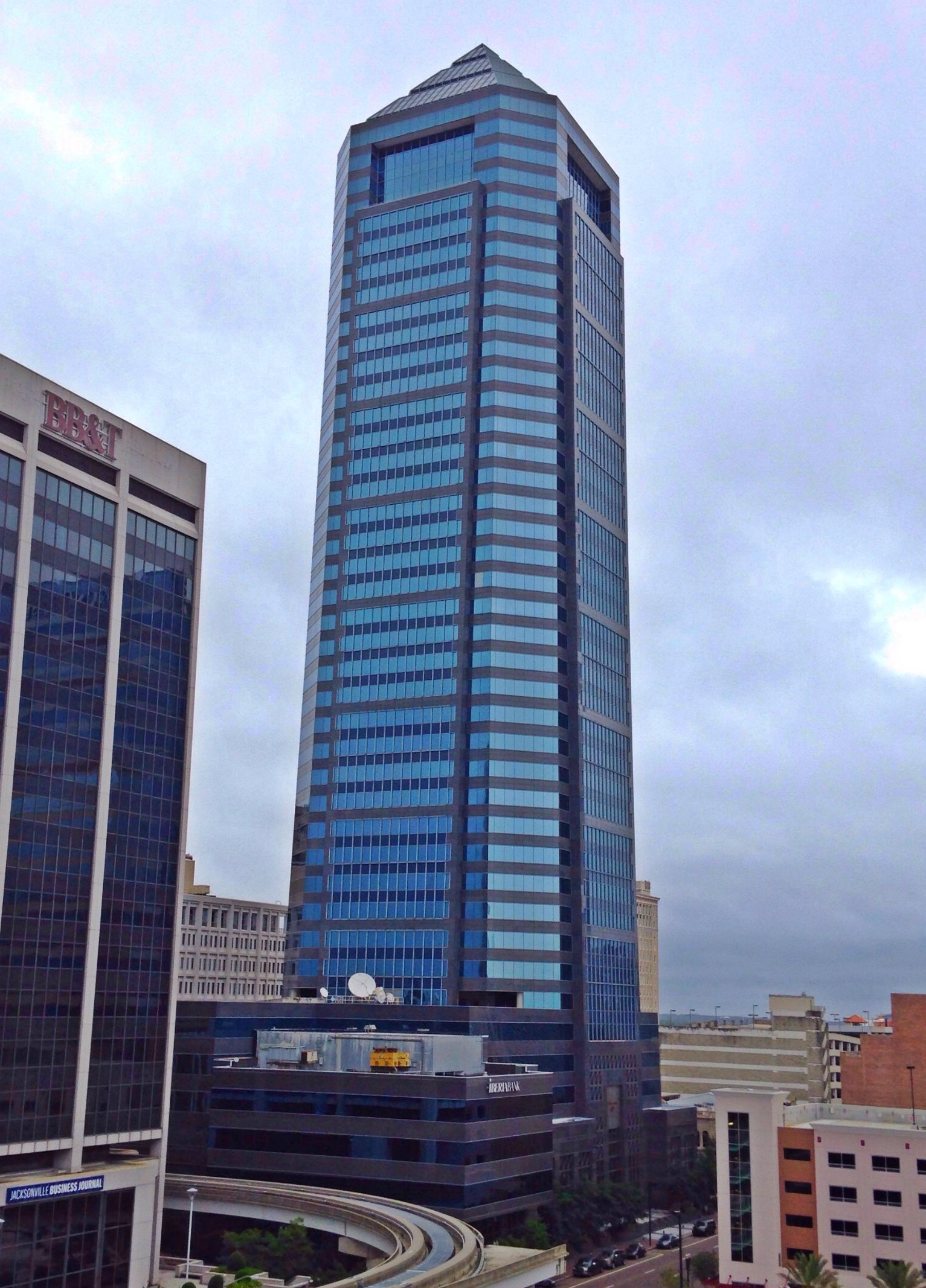
Bank of America Tower (1990)

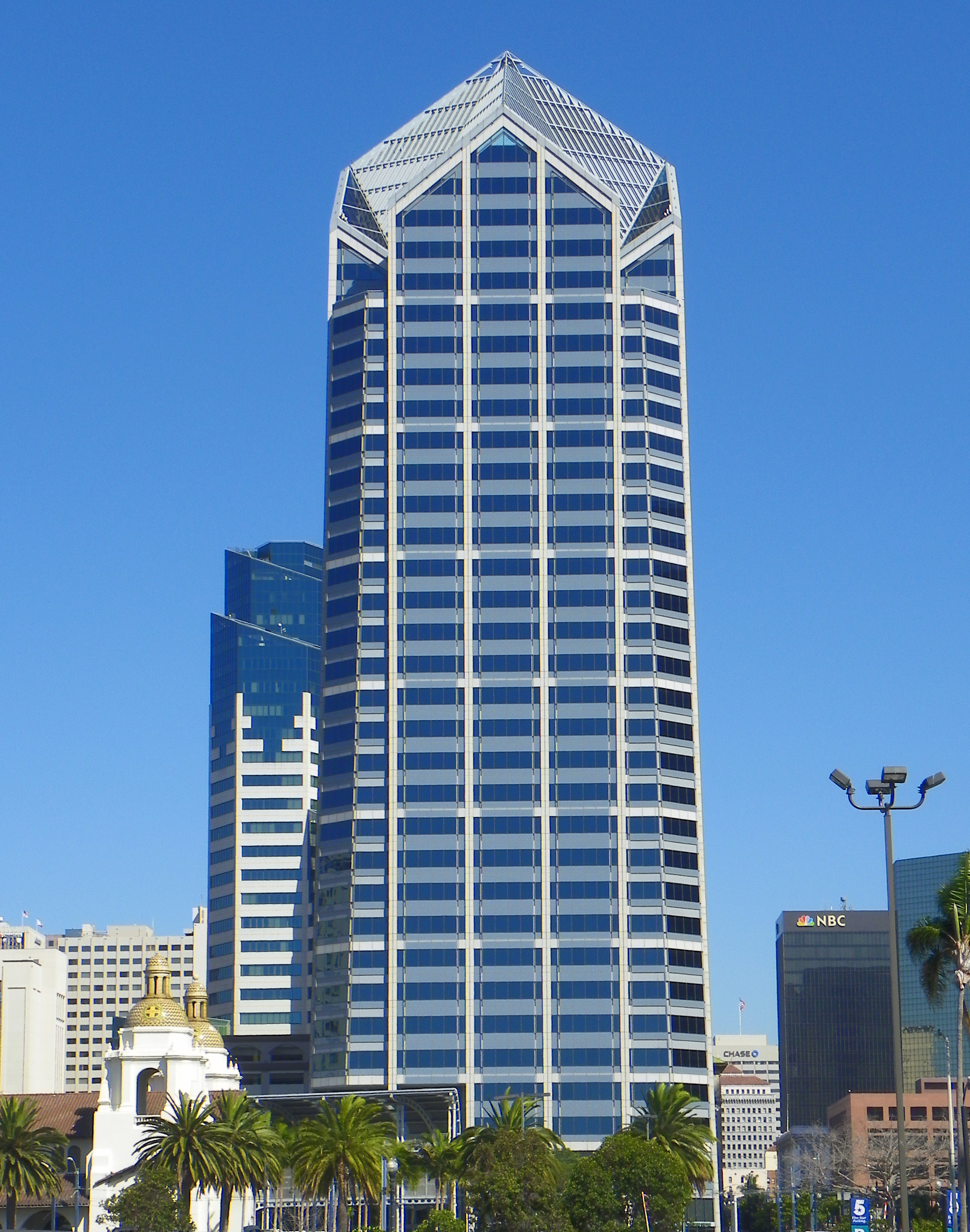
One America Plaza

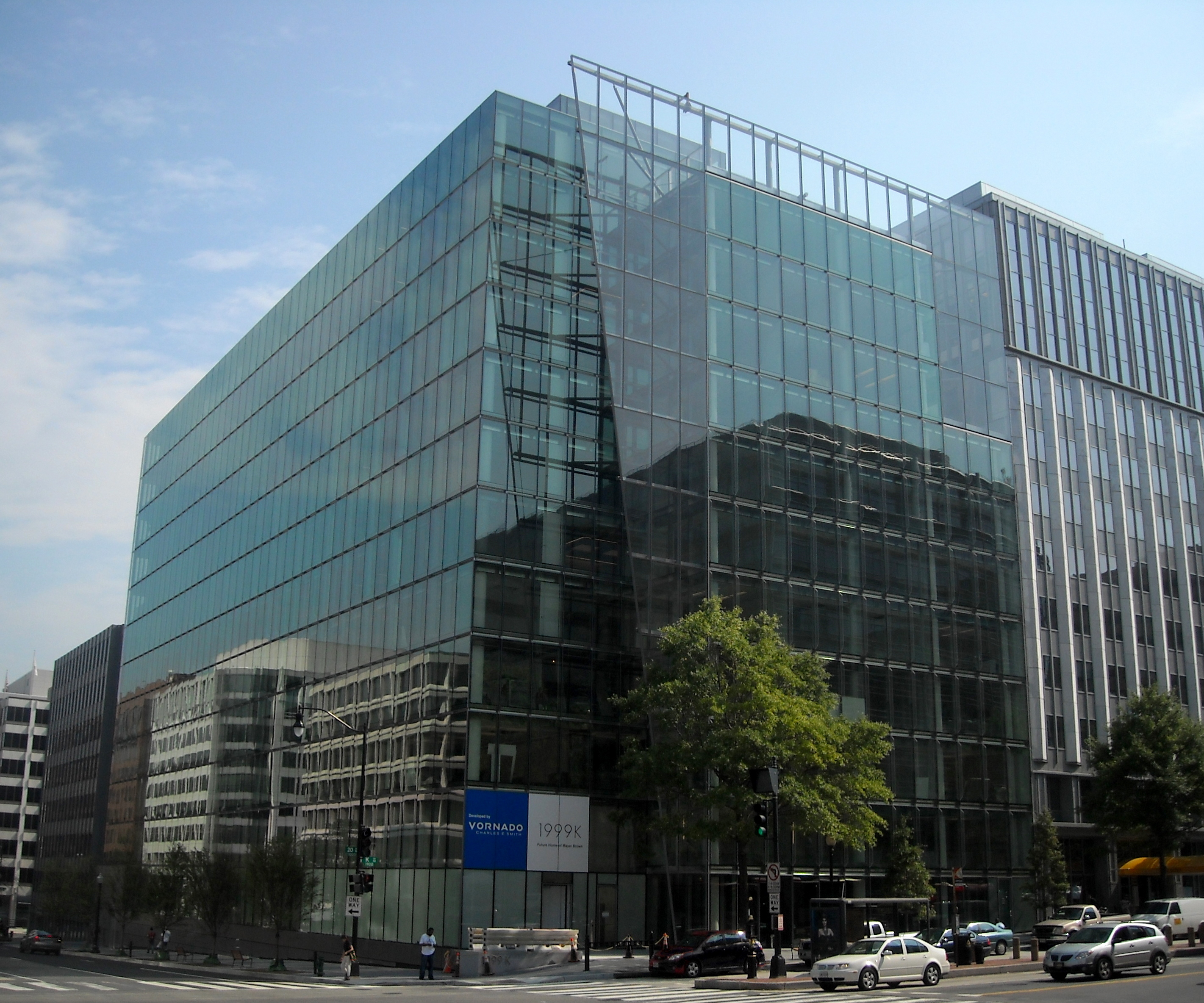
1999 K Street, NW in Washington, D.C.

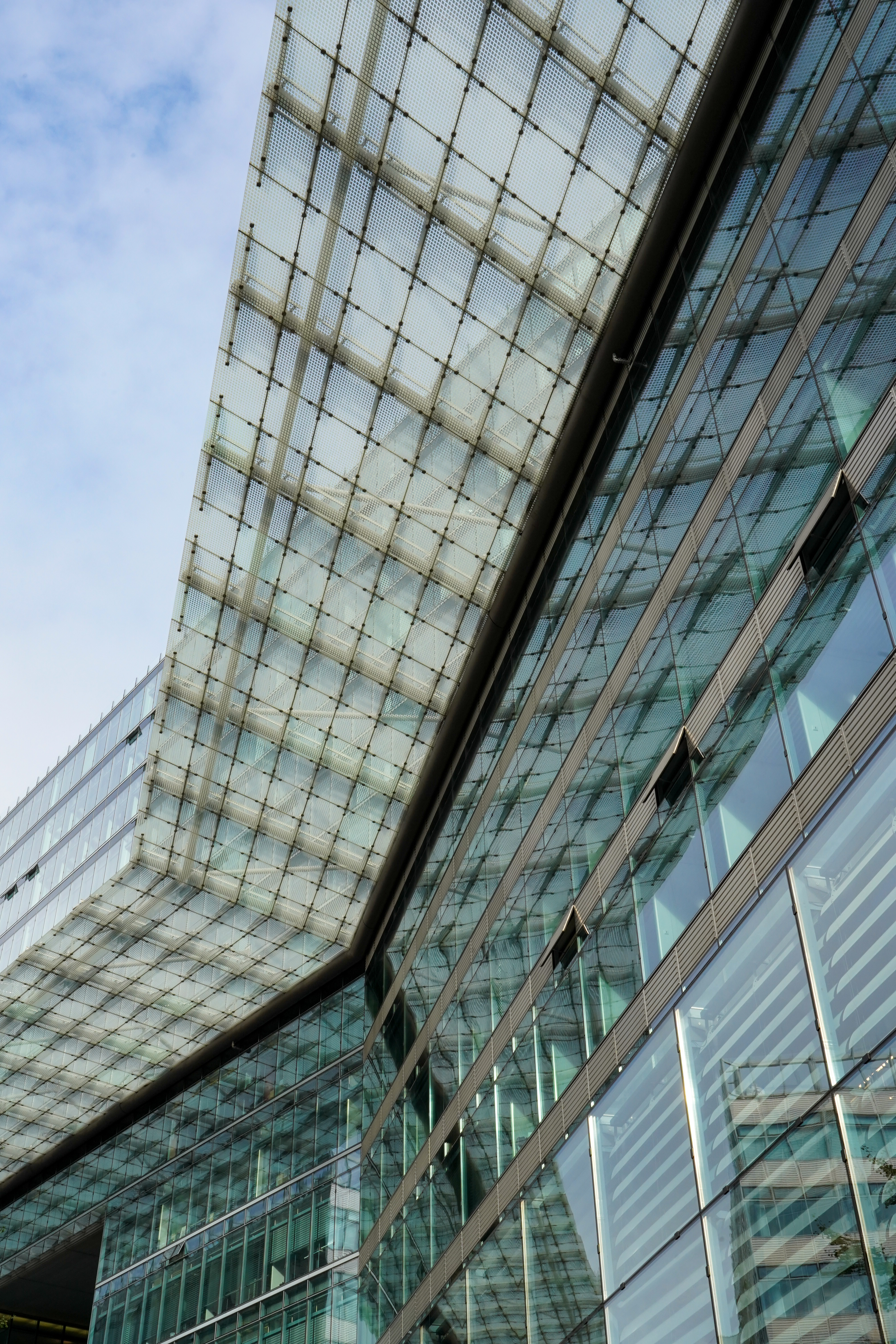
Facade of Neues Kranzler Eck, Berlin

[[

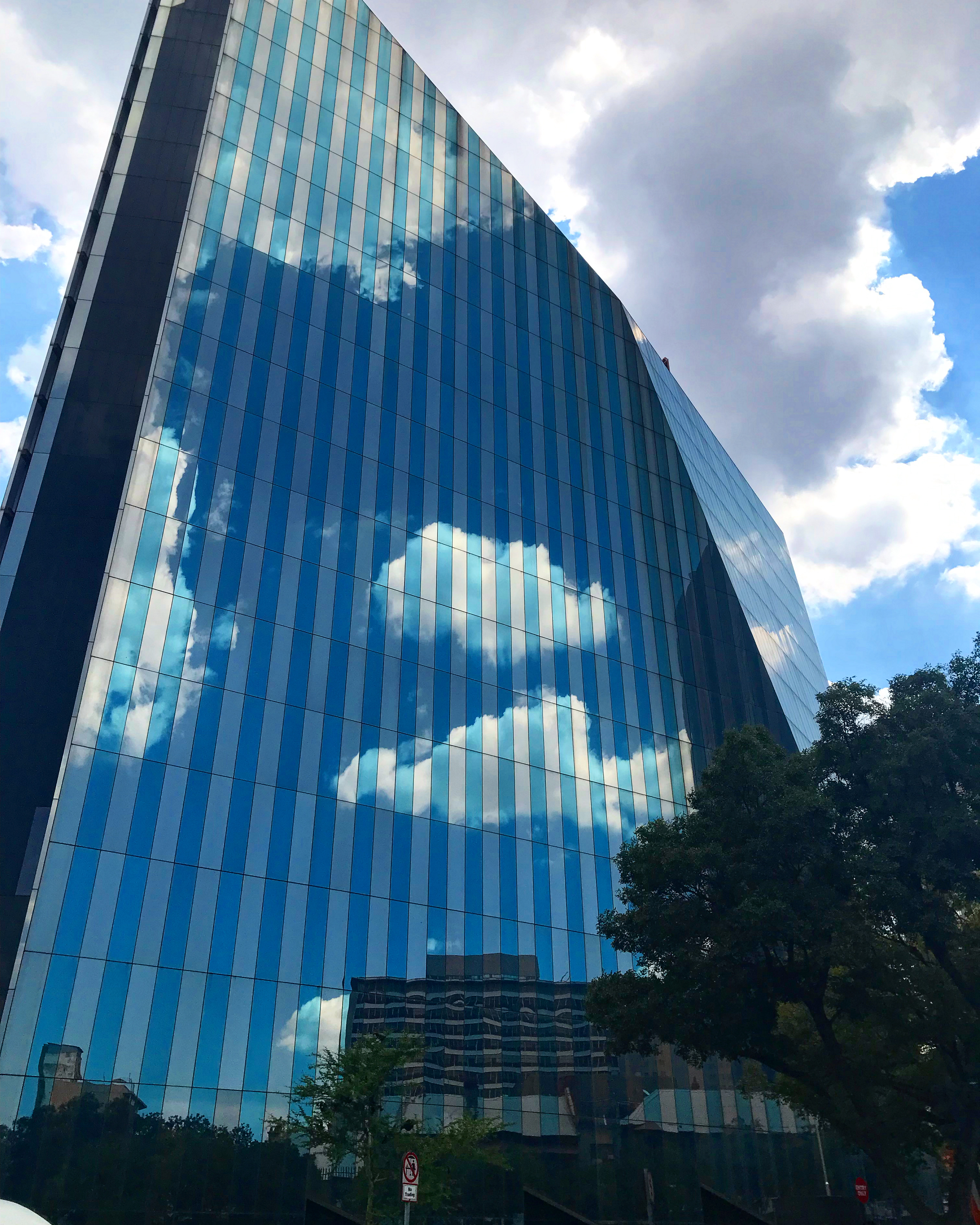
11 Diagonal street, Johannesburg

Following is a partial list of completed projects:

- 1974 Kemper Arena, Kansas City, Missouri
- 1976 Kansas City Convention Center, also known as H. Roe Bartle Exhibition Hall, Kansas City, Missouri
- 1976 Auraria Learning Resources Center, Auraria Higher Education Center, Denver, Colorado
- 1976 John Marshall Courts Building, Richmond, Virginia
- 1977 Michigan City Public Library, Michigan City, Indiana
- 1977 Saint Mary's College Athletic Facility, Notre Dame, Indiana
- 1978 W.W. Grainger Headquarters, Skokie, Illinois
- 1978 Rust-Oleum Corporation International Headquarters, Vernon Hills, Illinois
- 1978 La Lumiere Gymnasium, La Porte, Indiana
- 1979 Imperial Bank Tower Costa Mesa, California
- 1980 Horizon Bank (515 Franklin Street Bank) Michigan City, Indiana
- 1980 Xerox Centre, (55 West Monroe St) Chicago, IL
- 1981 United States Post Office, Oak Brook, Illinois
- 1981 De La Garza Career Center, East Chicago, Indiana
- 1981 Commonwealth Edison Company District Headquarters, Bolingbrook, Illinois
- 1982 Argonne Program Support Facility, Argonne National Laboratory, Illinois
- 1982 Eagle River Vacation House (The Jahn House), Eagle River, Wisconsin
- 1982 Area 2 Police Headquarters, Chicago
- 1982 Chicago Board of Trade Addition, Chicago
- 1982 One South Wacker, Chicago
- 1983 Agricultural Engineering Sciences Building Addition University of Illinois, Champaign, Illinois
- 1983 Learning Resources Center, College of DuPage, Glen Ellyn, Illinois
- 1983 First Source Centre, South Bend, Indiana
- 1984 11 Diagonal Street, Johannesburg, South Africa
- 1984 Plaza East Office Towers, Milwaukee, WI
- 1984 Shand Morahan Corporate Headquarters, Evanston, Illinois
- 1984 701 Building (Craig-Hallom Building), Minneapolis, MN
- 1984 O'Hare 'L' Station, O'Hare International Airport, Chicago
- 1985 James R. Thompson Center, Chicago
- 1985 362 West Street, Durban, South Africa
- 1986 Parktown Stands 102, 103, 85, 879, Johannesburg, South Africa
- 1986 MetroWest Office Building (2 Energy Center), Naperville, Illinois
- 1986 Oakbrook Terrace Tower, Oakbrook Terrace, Illinois
- 1987 Park Avenue Tower, New York, NY
- 1987 425 Lexington Avenue, New York, NY
- 1987 United Airlines Terminal 1 at O'Hare International Airport, Chicago
- 1987 America Apartments – 300 East 85th Street, New York, NY
- 1987 One Liberty Place, Philadelphia, PA
- 1987 Cityspire, New York, NY
- 1987 Citigroup Center, Chicago
- 1988 Wilshire-Midvale, Los Angeles, CA
- 1989 Trade Hall 1 (Halle 1), Frankfurt, Germany
- 1989 Metropolitan Transportation Authority Headquarters, 130 Livingston Street, Brooklyn, NY
- 1990 Bank of America Tower, Jacksonville, Florida
- 1990 Two Liberty Place, Philadelphia
- 1991 One America Plaza, San Diego, CA
- 1991 Messeturm, Frankfurt, Germany
- 1992 Hyatt Regency, Roissy, Paris, France
- 1992 120 North LaSalle, Chicago
- 1993 Hitachi Tower, Singapore
- 1993 Caltex House, Singapore
- 1994 Hotel Kempinski, Munich, Germany
- 1994 Kurfürstendamm 70, Berlin, Germany
- 1996 Fortis Bank Tower (Blaak 555), Rotterdam, Netherlands
- 1996 Principal Financial Group Corporate Four Building, Des Moines, Iowa
- 1997 RCID Administration Building, Buena Vista, Florida
- 1998 Generale Bank Nederland, Rotterdam, Netherlands
- 1999 European Union Charlemagne building, Brussels, Belgium
- 1999 Munich Airport Center, Germany
- 2000 Sony Center Berlin, Germany
- 2000 Cologne Bonn Airport, Cologne, Germany
- 2000 HA·LO Headquarters (presently the headquarters of Shure), Niles, Illinois
- 2000 Imperial Bank Tower Renovation, Costa Mesa, California
- 2001 Neues Kranzler Eck, Berlin, Germany
- 2002 Kaufhof Galeria, Chemnitz, Germany
- 2002 Shanghai International Expo Centre, Shanghai, China
- 2002 Bayer AG Konzernzentrale
- 2003 Deutsche Post Tower, Bonn, Germany
- 2003 IIT Student Housing, Chicago
- 2003 Highlight Munich Business Towers, Munich, Germany
- 2004 Mannheimer Corporate Headquarters, Mannheim, Germany
- 2004 Merck Serono Headquarters (Horizon Serono), Geneva, Switzerland
- 2005 Focus Media Center (Deutsche-Med-Platz), Rostock, Germany
- 2006 Suvarnabhumi Airport, Bangkok, Thailand
- 2006 Seminaris Campus Hotel, Berlin, Germany
- 2007 GranTokyo, Tokyo, Japan
- 2007 Margot and Harold Schiff Residences, Chicago
- 2007 600 North Fairbanks, Chicago
- 2008 Hegau Tower, Singen, Germany
- 2009 South Campus Chiller Plant, University of Chicago Chicago
- 2009 1999 K Street, Washington, D.C.
- 2010 Hafen Tower (Sign Tower), Speditionstrasse 1–3 Düsseldorf, Germany
- 2010 Veer Towers, Paradise, Nevada USA
- 2010 Weser Tower, Bremen, Germany
- 2010 Bonn Airport Parking, Cologne, Germany
- 2011 Joe and Rika Mansueto Library, Chicago
- 2012 Leatop Plaza, Guangzhou, China
- 2012 Skyline Tower, Munich, Germany
- 2012 JP Tower, Tokyo, Japan
- 2013 Cosmopolitan Twarda 2/4, Warsaw, Poland
- 2014 Zunda Towers, Riga, Latvia
- 2016 Doha Exhibition and Convention Center, Qatar
- 2016 Shanghai Convention Center, Shanghai, China
- 2016 50 West Street, New York, NY
- 2017 ThyssenKrupp Test Tower, Rottweil, Germany
- 2017 1900 Reston Station, Reston, Virginia
- 2024 1000M, Chicago, IL
- 2024 iCity, Moscow, Russia
- 2027 Residential complex SLAVA, Moscow, Russia

In his native town of Nuremberg, however, a project by Jahn was rejected by a citizens' referendum in 1996.

== Select awards ==
- 1991 – "Ten Most Influential Living American Architects" from the American Institute of Architects.
- 1993 – "Outstanding Achievement/Architect Award" from the American Academy of Art, Chicago.
- 1994 – Officer's cross of the Order of Merit of the Federal Republic of Germany
- 2002 – Institute Honour Award of the American Institute of Architects for the Sony Center.
- 2005 – Murphy/Jahn, Inc. recipient of the AIA Architecture Firm Award.
- 2005 – Pratt Institute Legends Award
- 2012 – AIA Chicago Lifetime Achievement Award
- 2018 – ENR Safety Award of Merit: 1900 Metro Reston Plaza

== Personal life ==
Jahn was interested in yachting, and in the late 1990s owned at least three yachts named Flash Gordon (one of his nicknames). In 1995, Jahn's Flash Gordon 2 won the annual Chicago to Mackinac Race, the oldest freshwater yacht race in the world. In 1998, Jahn invited his fellow Vietnam War veteran, George Henry, to race with him in the Waterbury Channel Open. In 1997, Flash Gordon 3 won the Admiral's Cup. It was the Farr 40 design yacht called Flash Gordon 6 that he had the most success winning the 2012 Farr 40 World Championship and they captured three straight North American Championship between 2015 and 2017.

He married Deborah Ann Lampe, an interior designer, in December 1970. Their son Evan was born in 1978.

== Images ==
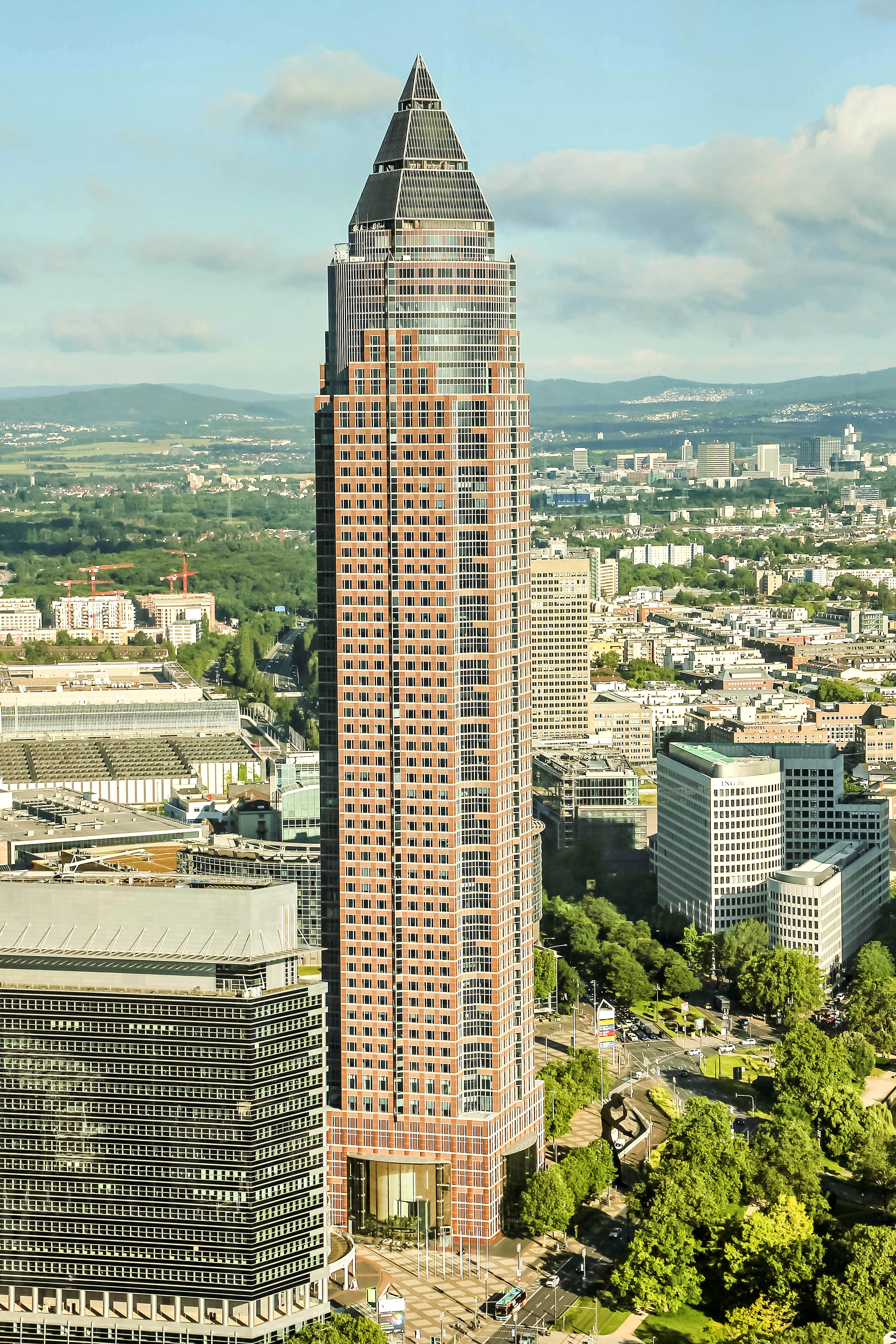
Messeturm (Fair Tower), Frankfurt

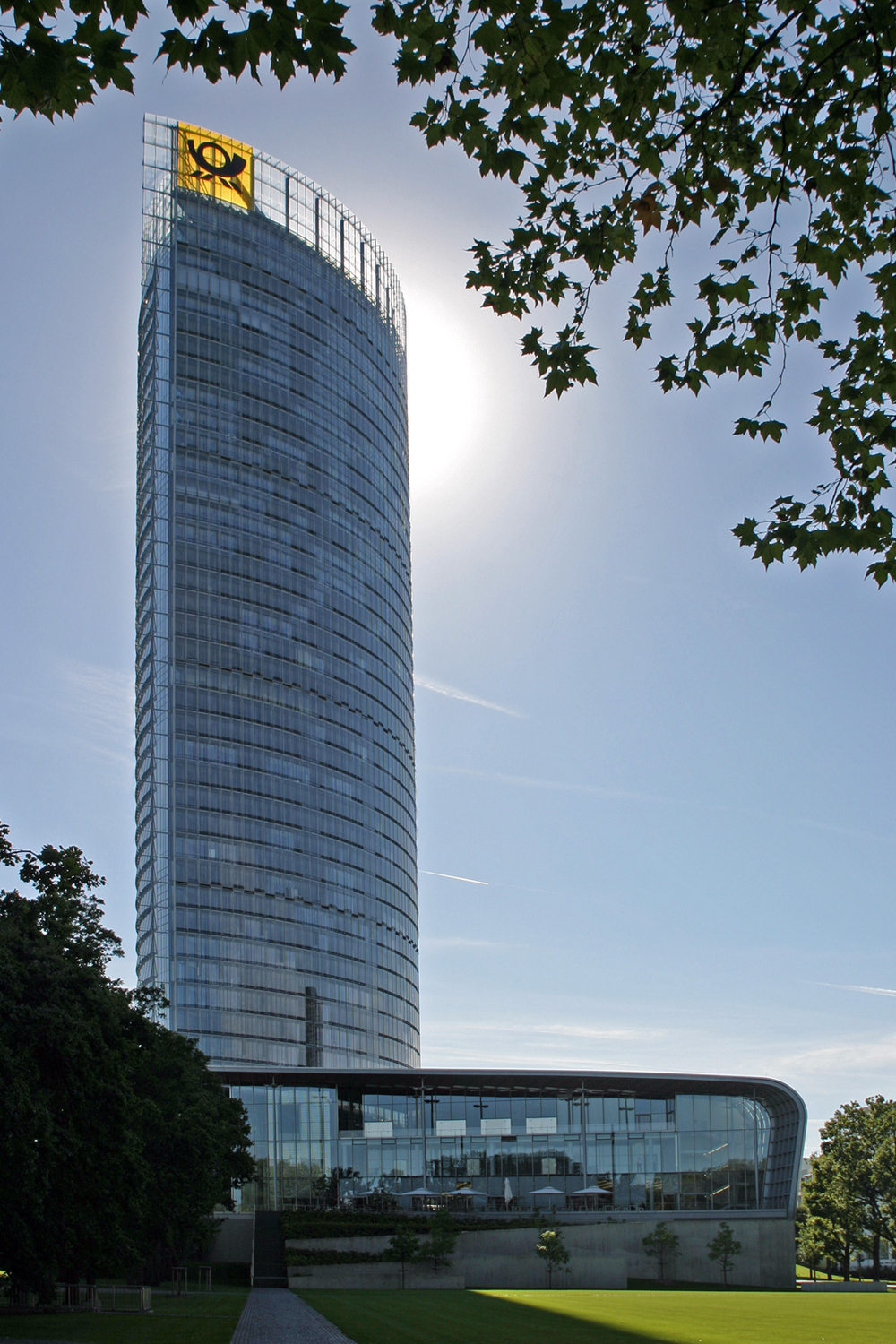
The Post Tower (Postal Tower), Bonn

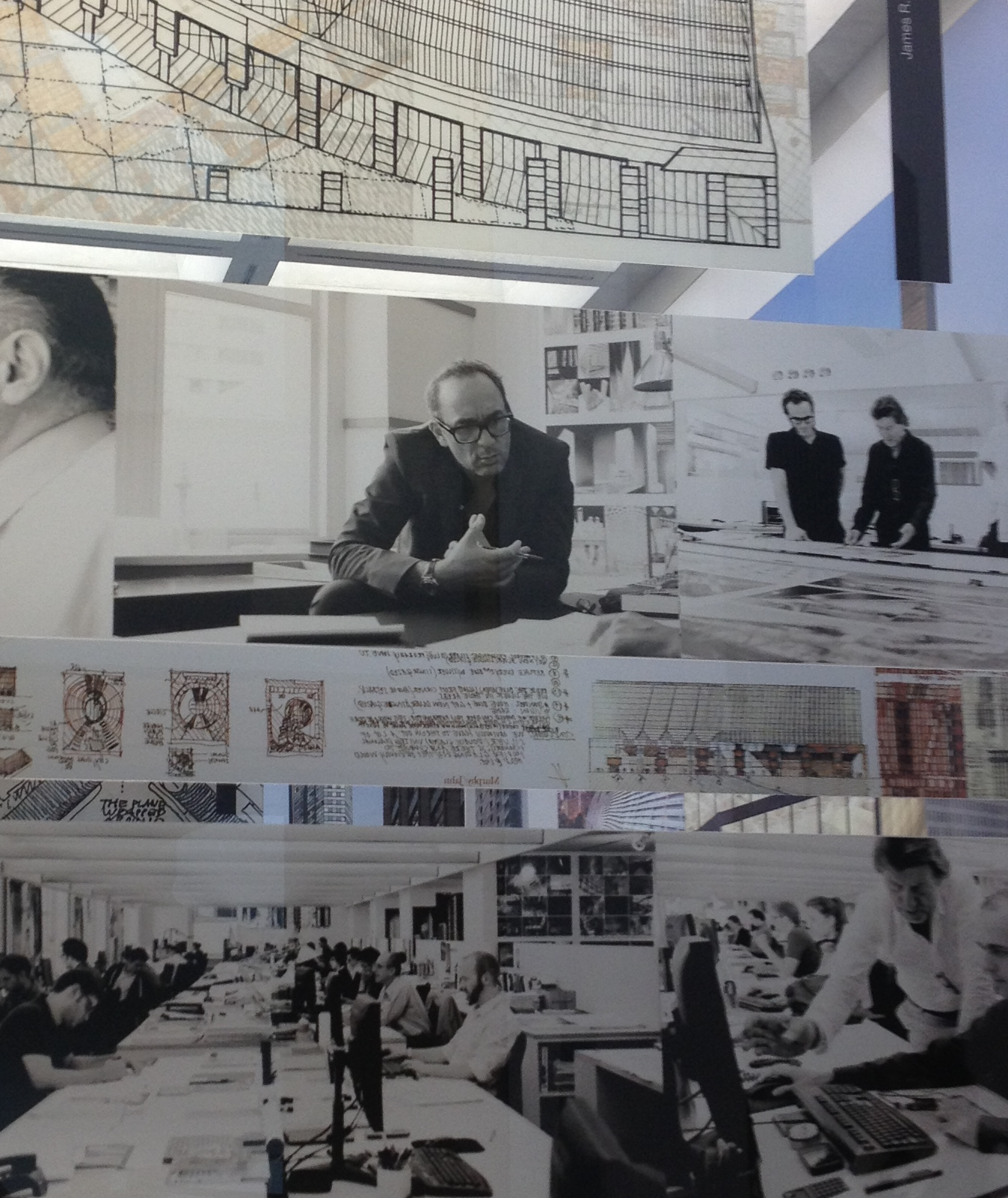
Exhibition "Process/Progress" Nuremberg, Germany 2012-2013
