= The Center Potsdamer Platz =

Ensemble of buildings in Berlin, Germany

Coordinates: 52°30′36″N 13°22′25″E

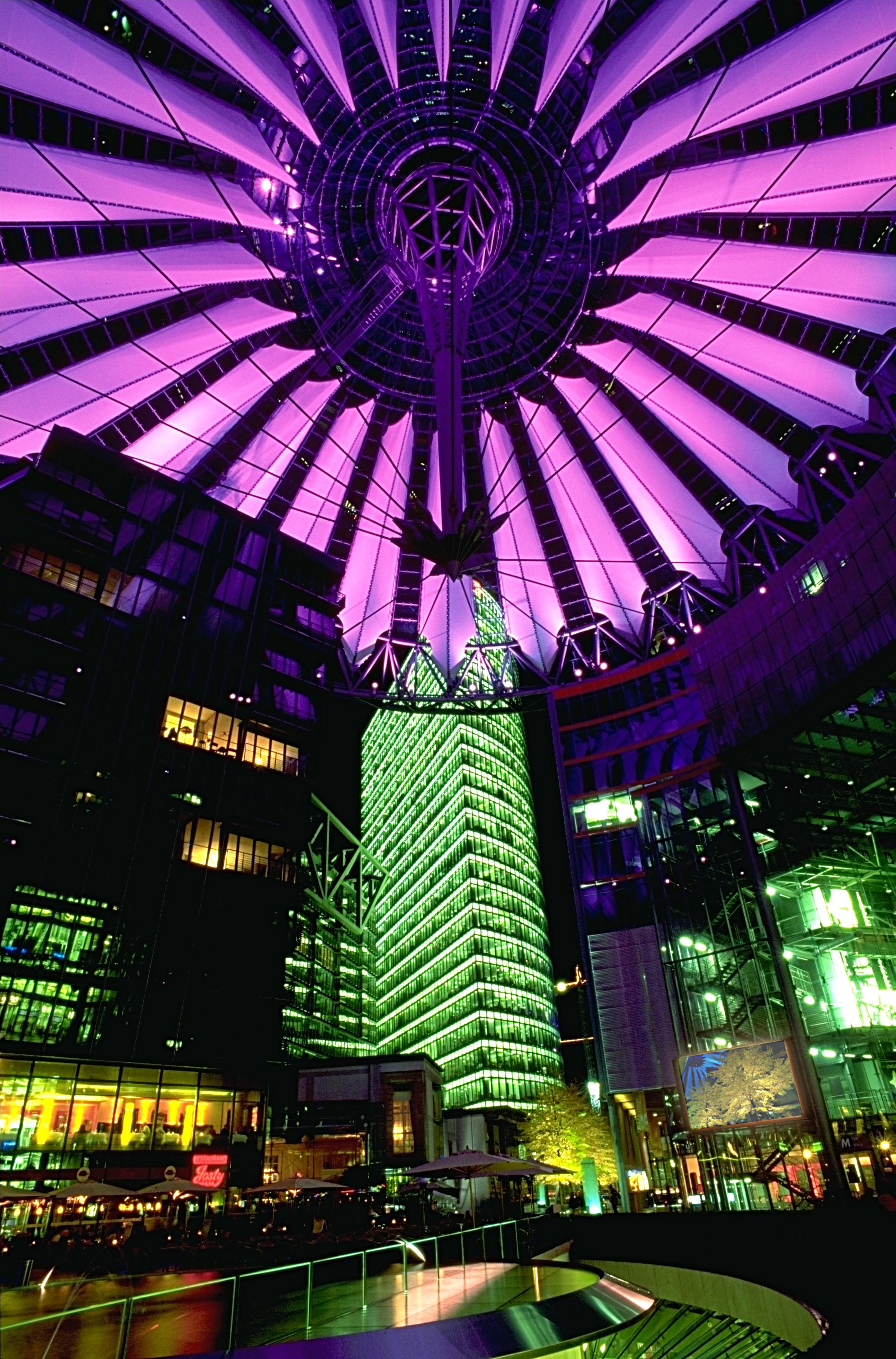
- The Center Potsdamer Platz, formerly known as Sony Center, displays a "cyberpunk corporate urban (futuristic)" aesthetic.
- Interactive map of the The Center Potsdamer Platz area

General information
- Location: Berlin, Germany
- Groundbreaking: 1995
- Construction started: 1995
- Completed: 1998
- Opened: 14 June 2000; 26 years ago

Design and construction
- Architects: Helmut Jahn; Peter Walker (landscape architect)
- Architecture firm: Murphy/Jahn
- Engineer: Jaros, Baum & Bolles (MEP)
- Structural engineer: Ove Arup & Partners
- Other designers: Waagner-Biro

Website
- www.das-center-am-potsdamer-platz.de/en

The Center Potsdamer Platz (known as Sony Center until March 2023) is a complex of eight buildings located at the Potsdamer Platz in Berlin, Germany, designed by Helmut Jahn. It opened in 2000 and housed Sony's German headquarters. The cinemas in the center were closed at the end of 2019.

== History ==
In the early 20th century, the site was originally home to Berlin's bustling city center. During World War II, it was the location of the infamous Nazi People's Court. Most of the buildings in its vicinity were destroyed or damaged during World War II. From 1961 onwards, most of the area became part of the "No Man's Land" of the Berlin Wall, resulting in the destruction of the remaining buildings. After the fall of the Berlin Wall on 9 November 1989, the square became the focus of attention again, as a large (some 60 ha (150 acres)), attractive location in the heart of a major European capital city had suddenly become available.

As part of a redevelopment effort for the area, the space was to be developed. In 1992, Sony acquired the 30,000-square-meter (320,000 sq ft) site from the Berlin city government for 97.2 million German marks, about US$61.6 million. Shortly after, the European Commission briefly investigated whether Sony paid less than the market price. Over the following years, a total of eight buildings were designed by Helmut Jahn and Peter Walker as landscape architect, and construction was completed in 2000 at a total cost of 750 million euros.

The iconic 4,000 m^{2} (43,000 sq ft) vaulted roof covering the central open area between the main buildings was engineered and built by Waagner-Biro using steel, glass and translucent fabric.

In February 2008 Sony sold the Sony Center for less than 600 million euros to a group of German and US investment funds, including investment bank Morgan Stanley, Corpus Sireo and an affiliate of The John Buck Company. The group sold the Sony Center to the National Pension Service of South Korea for 570 million euros in 2010.

In 2017, Oxford Properties and Madison International Realty acquired the complex for close to 1.1 billion euros.

From 1999 until 2019, CineStar operated a cinema, Cinestar Sony Center, and an IMAX theater in the center. Both were used for screenings in the Berlin International Film Festival until their closure.

== Design ==
Architects Murphy/Jahn sought to create a complex where the outside was the "real" city, while inside was a "virtual" city, reinforcing this dichotomy through a series of passages and gates. The design's use of light, both natural and artificial, creates an environment that is "luminous, not illuminated."

When the building opened, the Chicago Tribune wrote: "Jahn's design for the Sony Center bears a superficial resemblance to the dizzying atrium of his James R. Thompson Center in Chicago's Loop because its buildings wrap around a big public space. But unlike the Thompson Center, the Sony Center's public space, called the Forum, has an umbrella-like roof of steel, glass and fabric partly open to the elements, with a cone-shaped, 30-foot-wide opening in its center."

Hochtief was the general contractor; Jaros, Baum & Bolles provided MEP engineering; and the structural engineering consultants were BGS Ingenieursozietät and Ove Arup & Partners.

== Attractions ==
The Center contains a mix of shops, restaurants, a conference center, hotel rooms, around 67 residential units, offices, and a Legoland Discovery Centre. It also contained the Museum of Film and Television, until its closure on 1 November 2024 for a move to the nearby E-Werk complex in 2025.

Free Wi-Fi is available. During major sports events like the 2006 FIFA World Cup, it was also home to a large television screen on which the games were shown to viewers sitting in the large open area in the middle.

The Center is located near Berlin Potsdamer Platz railway station, which can be accessed on foot. A large, covered shopping center, the Mall of Berlin, is nearby, as are many hotels, Deutsche Bahn central offices, along with an office building that is home to the fastest elevator in Europe.

== Gallery ==
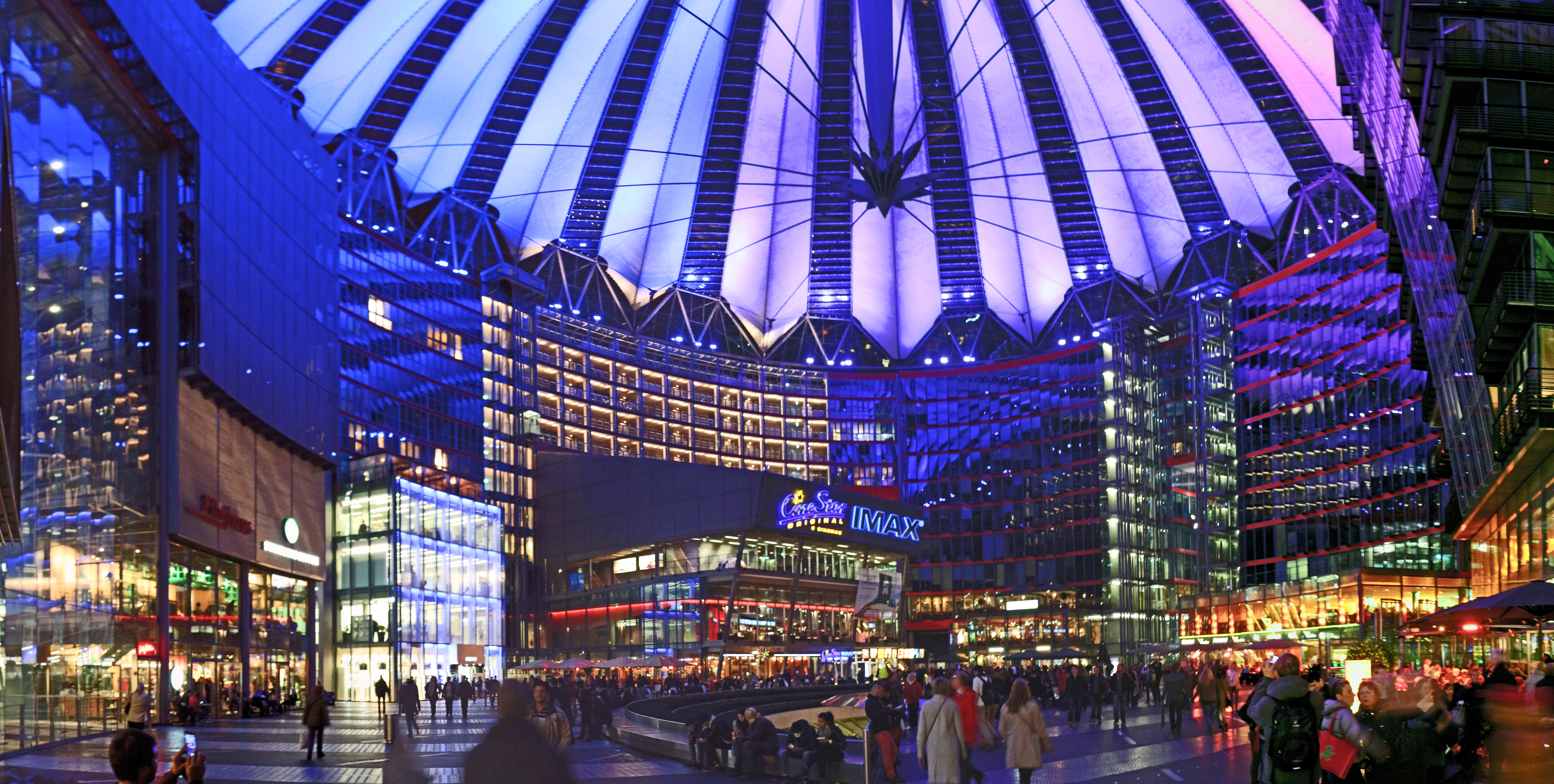
Central forum

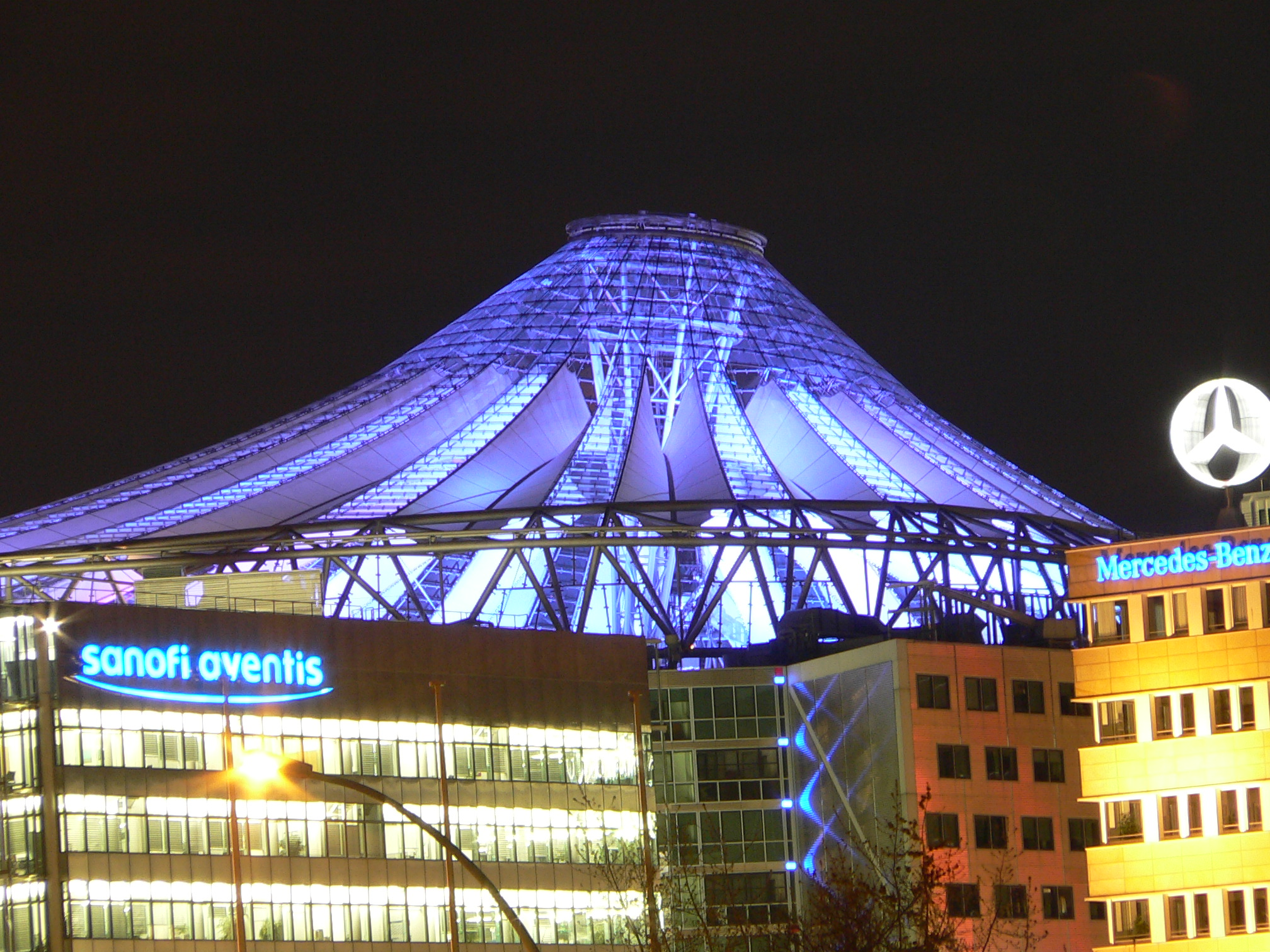
Exterior

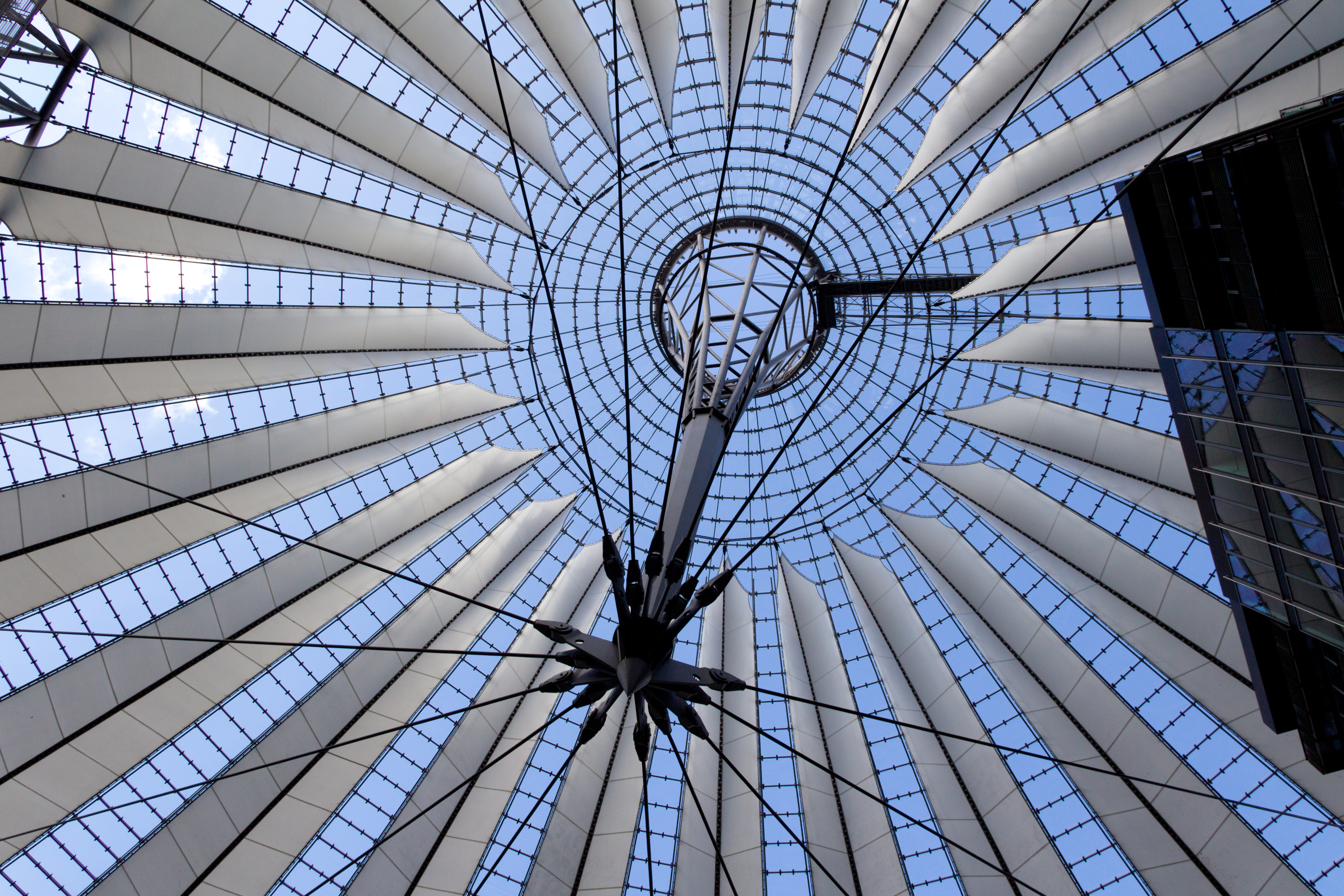
Glass roof
