= Essex on the Park =

Apartment building in Chicago, Illinois

Sentral
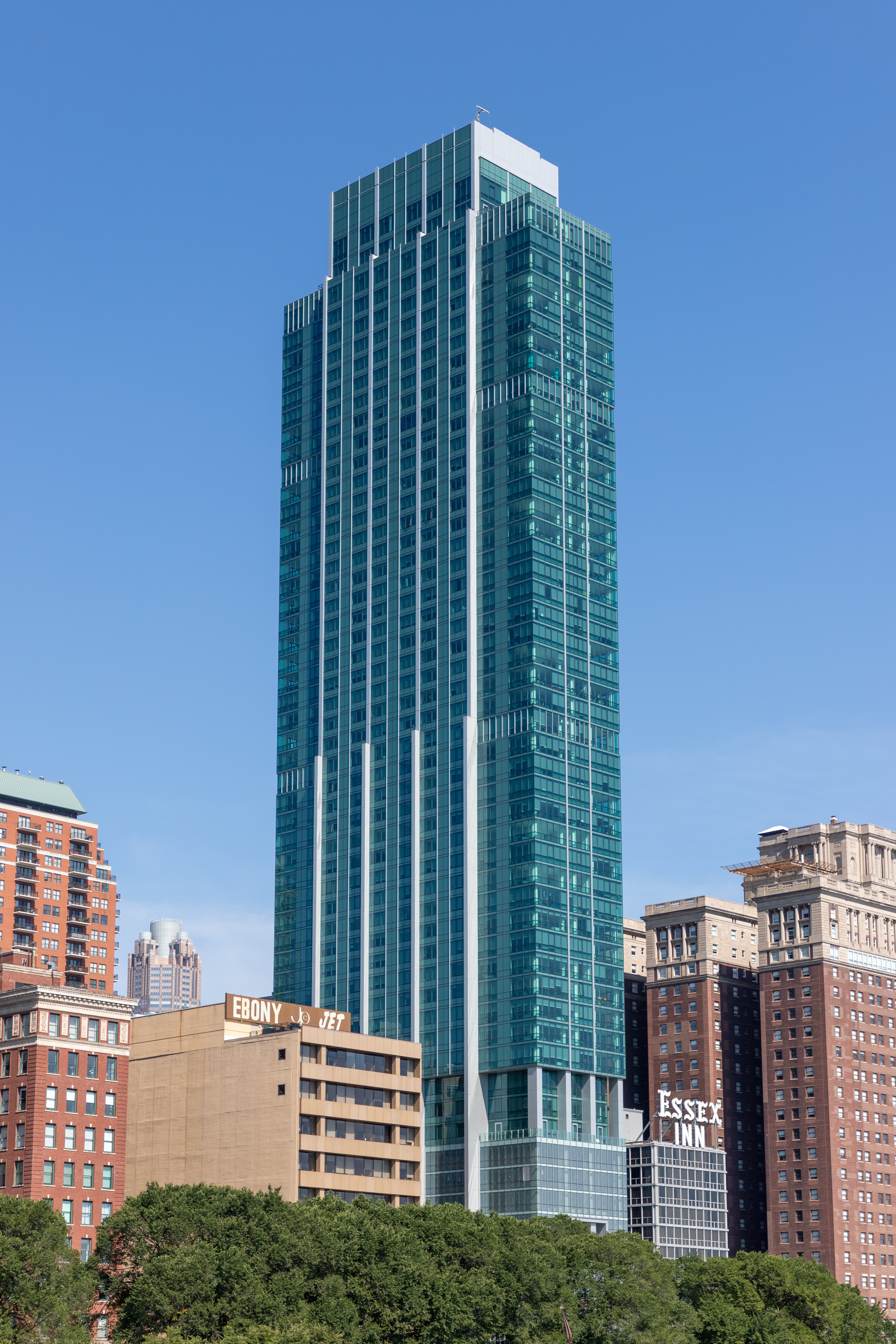
- From the southeast in April 2019

General information
- Status: Completed
- Type: Residential
- Location: 808 South Michigan Avenue; Chicago, Illinois, U.S.
- Coordinates: 41.8715°N 87.6247°W
- Completed: December 2018
- Opened: March 1, 2019; 7 years ago
- Operator: Oxford Capital

Height
- Roof: 620 feet (189.0 m)

Technical details
- Floor count: 56

Design and construction
- Architect: Hartshorne Plunkard Architecture
- Main contractor: Power Construction Company

Other information
- Number of units: 479
- Parking: 177

Website
- sentral.com/chicago/michigan-avenue

Sentral Michigan Avenue or 808 South Michigan (Avenue) is a 479-unit apartment building on South Michigan Avenue in the Loop community area, Chicago, Illinois. It is connected to Le Méridien Essex Chicago at 800 South Michigan Avenue.

The development was marketed and opened as Essex on the Park on March 1, 2019, but rebranded as Sentral (stylized as Sen+ral) Michigan Avenue in July 2021.

== History ==
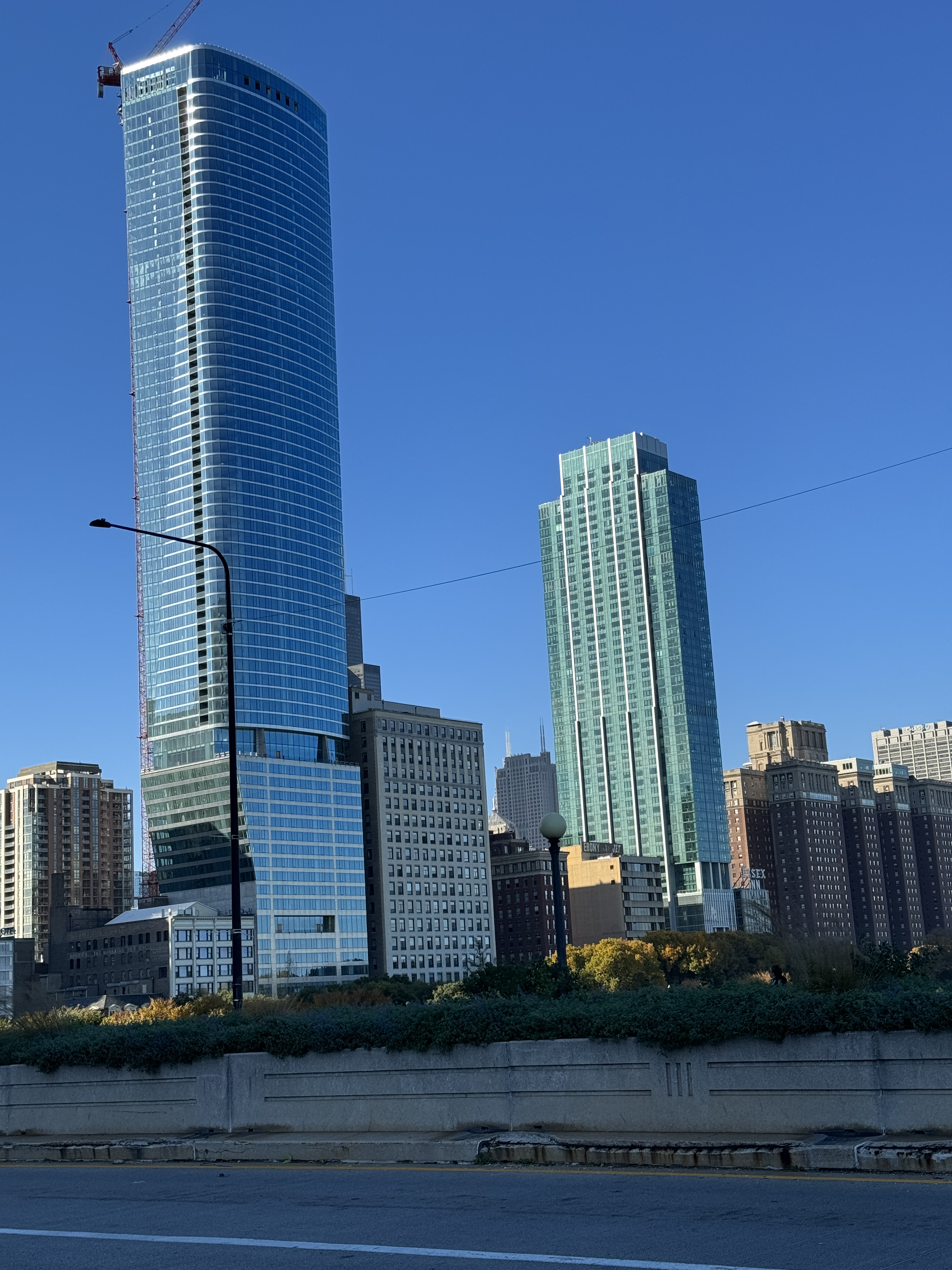
Essex on the Park (right) and 1000M (left) in October 2023 from Roosevelt Road near Columbus Drive

In November 2014, Oxford Capital Group LLC acquired the 254-room Essex Inn at 800 South Michigan, along the Historic Michigan Boulevard District across from Grant Park, from the Gecht family who built the hotel in 1961. Oxford acquired the property, which sits atop a ground lease that runs until 2057, for $25.5 million. By September 2015, Oxford submitted plans to replace the parking garage and swimming pool next to the Essex Inn with a 48-story apartment tower hosting 388 units. The plan was modified during 2016, removing proposed open air bars between the lower and upper levels. On January 3, 2017, Oxford Capital Group received a $170 million construction loan. On January 19, 2017, Oxford broke ground on the new plan, which at the time proposed a 57-story 476-apartments and 290-hotel room development next to the Essex Inn. Preleasing began on December 28, 2018 for the new building, which was considered completed at the time. On March 1, 2019, the 56-story apartment tower opened and the 14-story/274-room Hotel Essex, which was newly renovated from the shell of the Essex Inn, opened on April 1, 2019.

Prior to the redevelopment of the property, the Essex Inn earned preliminary landmark status from the Commission on Chicago Landmarks ensuring that the Essex Inn sign will be preserved on the rooftop. At the time, the Essex Inn was planned to be added to the National Register of Historic Places. The final Chicago Landmark recommendation was adopted by the Commission on December 1, 2016.

In April 2021, Oxford Capital Group announced that the Hotel Essex would be joining Marriott's Le Méridien brand, with the hotel rebranding as Le Méridien Essex Chicago.

== Details ==
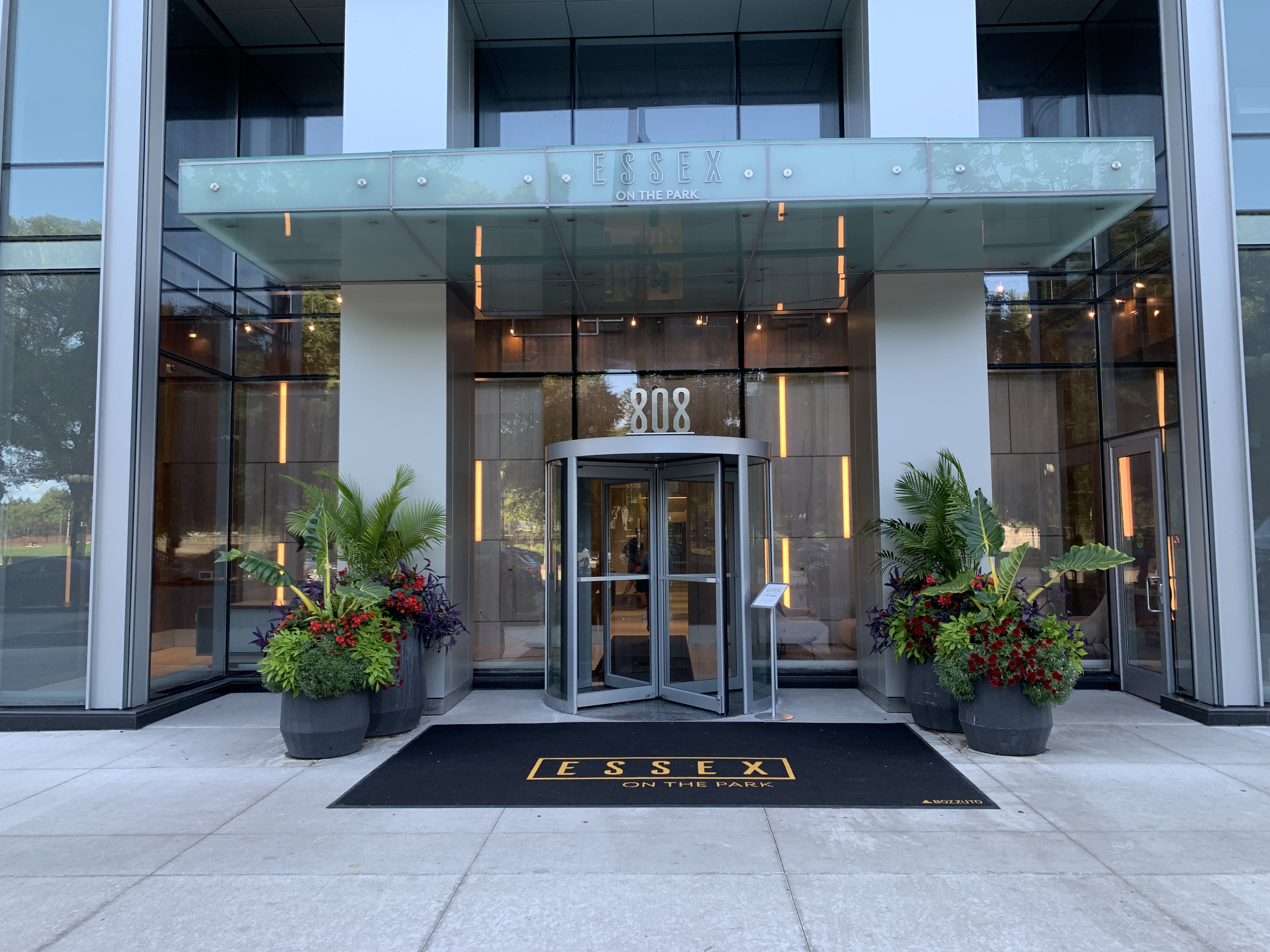
The entrance shows an 808 South Michigan address, despite various accounts in the press of the actual address.

Oxford Capital and London-based Quadrum Global developed the project in partnership based on designs by Hartshorne Plunkard Architecture. The new 479-unit apartment tower is described with various addresses: 812 South Michigan (Chicago Tribune, Skyscrapercenter.com), 808 South Michigan (Crain's Chicago Business, Curbed Chicago Chicago Sun-Times) and 800 South Michigan (Emporis.com). The tower's 177-space parking garage is located behind the Michigan avenue facing amenities. Sonder manages 92 of the apartment units in the building for short-term rentals. The base of the new building is respectful of the skyline of the pre-existing landmark district, while the tall tower extension rises from an intermediating 4-story winter garden atop the base. The sign atop the original Inn remains as a historical artifact of its times and the buildings are linked by two restaurants. The new building has a host of modern amenities and its residents also have access to the amenities of the newly renovated hotel. Power Construction Company served as the general contractor; Hartshorne Plunkard Architecture was the architect and it was developed by Oxford Capital.

== See also ==
- List of tallest buildings in Chicago
