= Blue Cross-Blue Shield Building =

Office building in Chicago, Illinois

Coordinates: 41°53′12″N 87°37′47.5″W

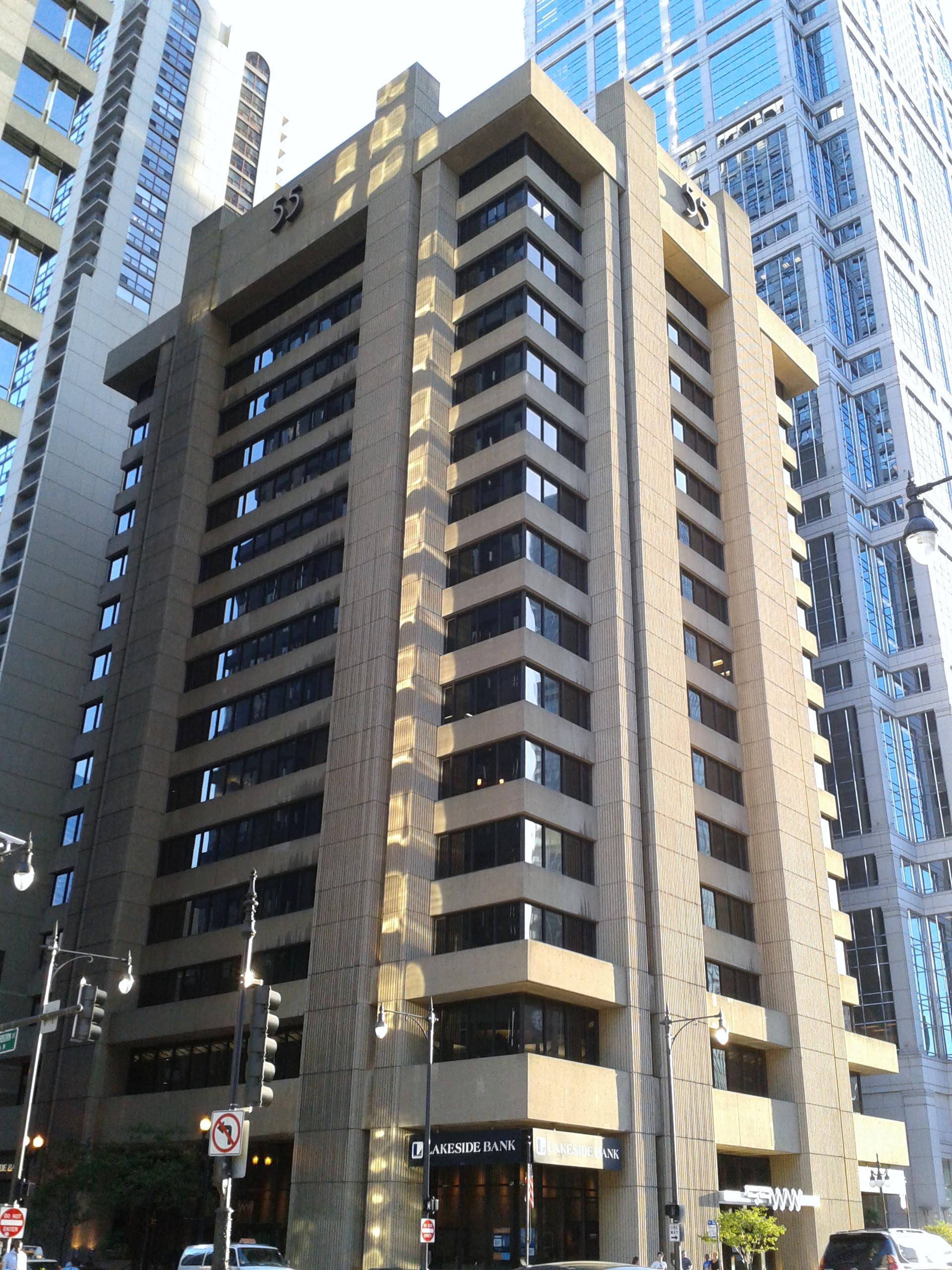
The Blue Cross-Blue Shield Building

The Blue Cross-Blue Shield Building is an office building at 55 West Wacker Drive in the Loop in Downtown Chicago, Illinois. It was designed in a Brutalist style by C.F. Murphy Associates. The building opened in 1968 as the headquarters for BlueCross BlueShield of Illinois. Foreign tenants of this Building includes the Taipei Economic and Cultural Office in Chicago (TECO-Chicago), the consular post of Taiwan in Illinois.
