= Charles Murphy (architect) =

American architect (1890–1985)

- Born: Charles F. Murphy; February 9, 1890; Jersey City, New Jersey, U.S.
- Died: May 22, 1985 (aged 95); Chicago, Illinois, U.S.
- Notable work: O'Hare International Airport; One Prudential Plaza; McCormick Place; Richard J. Daley Center
- Spouse: Josephine C. Murphy (b. 1901 / m. 1926 / d. Feb. 9, 1999)
- Children: 2

Charles Francis Murphy (February 9, 1890 – May 22, 1985) was an American architect based in Chicago, Illinois.

== Biography ==
Born in Jersey City, New Jersey, Murphy was educated at the De La Salle Institute in Chicago. His first job was as a secretary, joining the offices of D.H. Burnham & Company in 1911 and he was steadily promoted to become personal secretary to the architect Ernest Graham.

After Graham died in 1936, Murphy moved on to co-found the architectural practice Shaw, Naess & Murphy with Alfred P. Shaw and Sigurd E. Naess (1886 - 1970). Murphy had no formal training as an architect at the time. He was next part of Naess & Murphy. The practice was later renamed C. F. Murphy Associates and later Murphy/Jahn Inc. in 1981 when Helmut Jahn took over as president.

Murphy was awarded an honorary degree from St. Xavier University in 1961, and became a fellow of the American Institute of Architects in 1964.

== Selected buildings ==
- Miami Herald Building (1960), demolished in 2014
- Richard J. Daley Center (1965)
- Blue Cross-Blue Shield Building (1968)
- McCormick Place, Chicago (1970), convention center rebuilt following a fire in 1967
- O'Hare Airport’s original Terminal 1, and current Terminals 2 and 3
- J. Edgar Hoover Building

=== Gallery ===
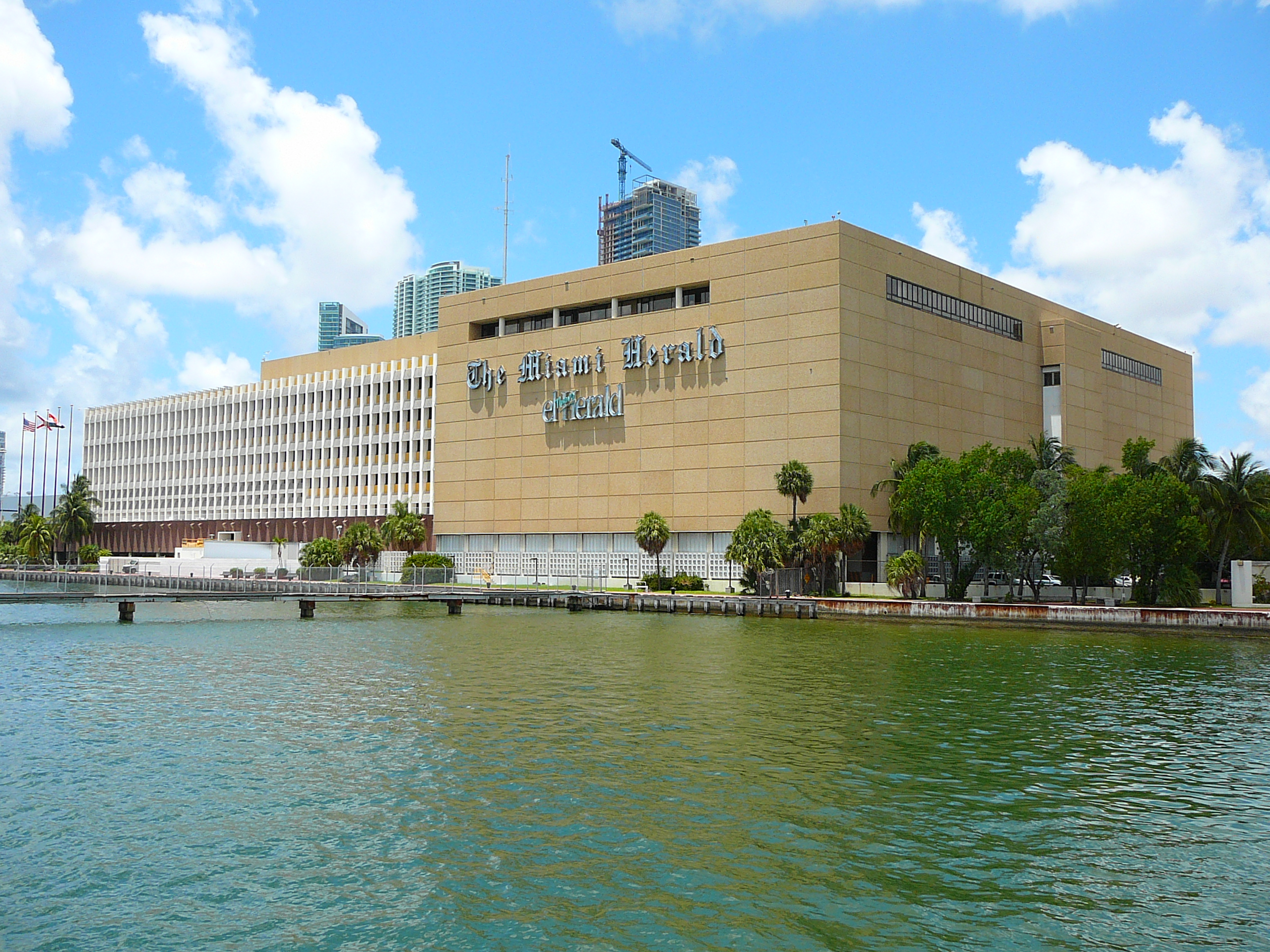
Miami Herald building, Miami

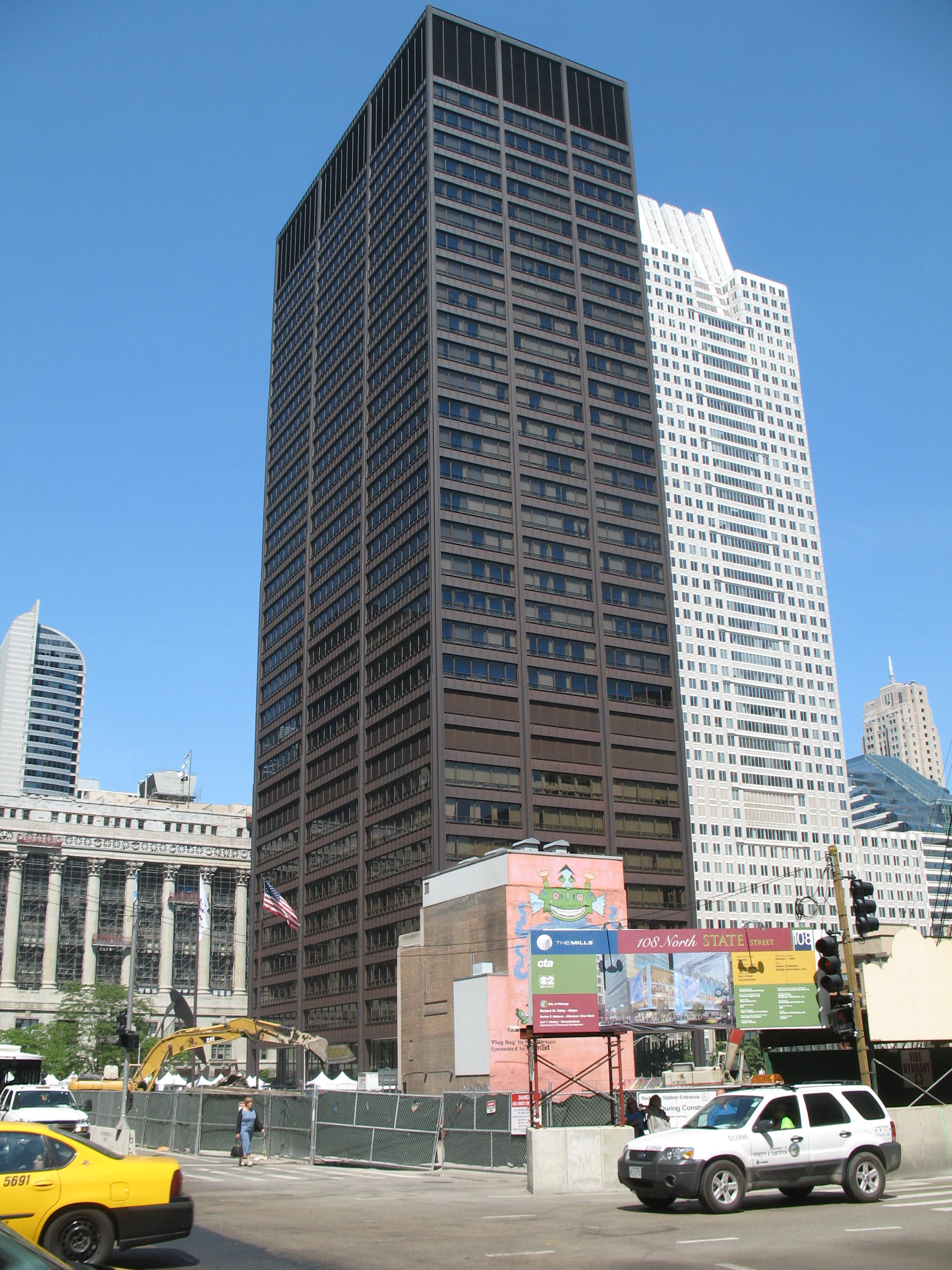
Richard J. Daley Center, Chicago

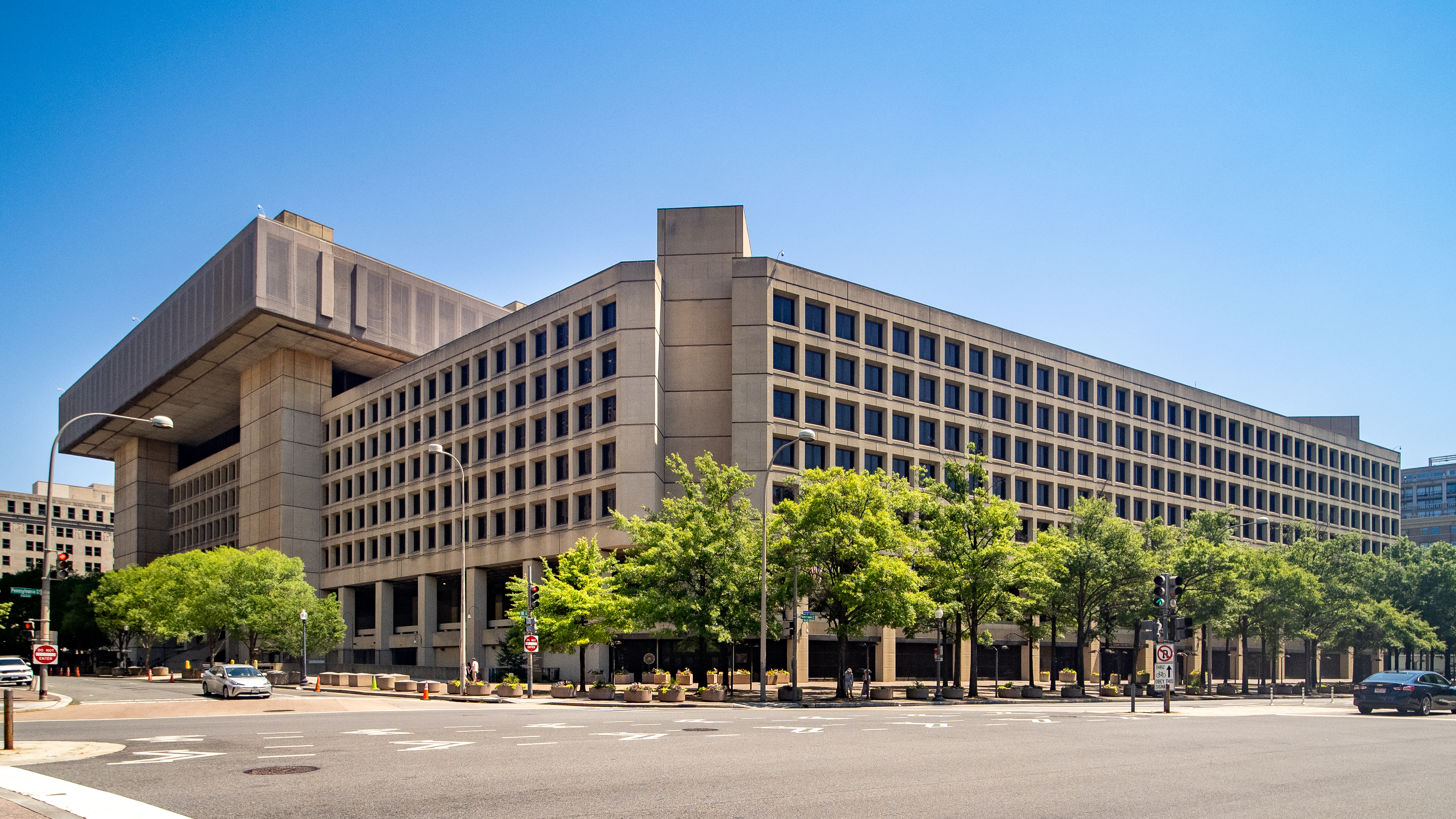
J. Edgar Hoover Building, Washington, DC

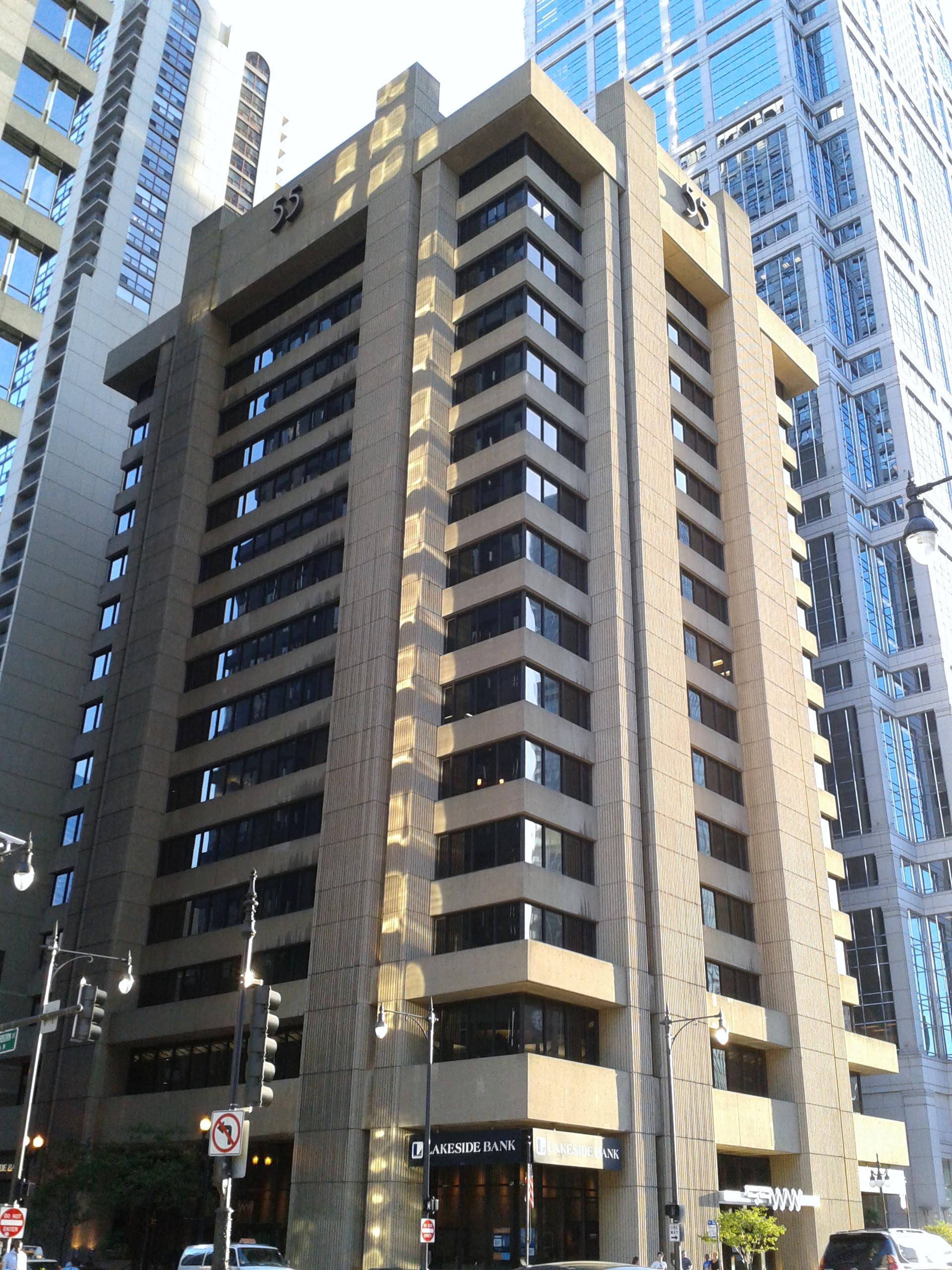
Blue Cross-Blue Shield Building, Chicago
