= One America Plaza =

Office skyscraper in San Diego, California

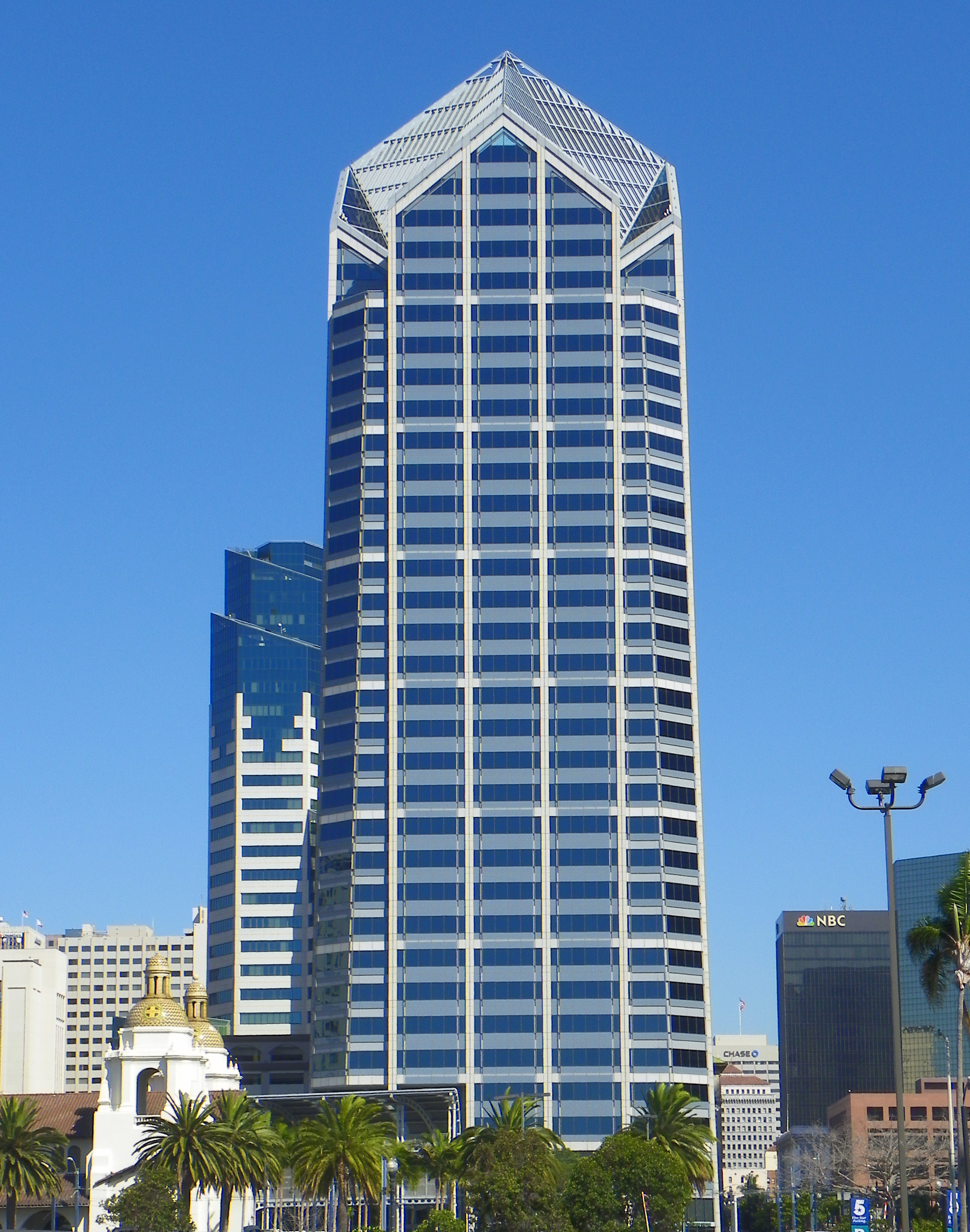
- Interactive map of the One America Plaza area

General information
- Type: Commercial offices
- Location: 600 West Broadway; San Diego, California
- Coordinates: 32.716244°N 117.168712°W
- Completed: 1991
- Owner: Saca Development

Height
- Roof: 500 ft (150 m)

Technical details
- Floor count: 34
- Floor area: 623,001 sq ft (57,878.7 m^{2})

Design and construction
- Architects: Murphy/Jahn Architects; KMA Architecture
- Main contractor: Shimizu Corporation

One America Plaza is the tallest building in San Diego, California, and a prominent fixture in the waterfront district of the downtown San Diego skyline. The 34-story, 500 ft (150 m), 623,000 sq ft (57,900 m^{2}), obelisk-shaped tower was designed by Helmut Jahn of Murphy/Jahn Architects and KMA Architecture. The top of the building bears a striking resemblance to the end of a Phillips head screwdriver and has a similar appearance to Two Liberty Place in Philadelphia, also designed by Jahn, which is a year older.

The building is the maximum height permitted by the Federal Aviation Administration (FAA) for a structure in downtown San Diego due to its close proximity to San Diego International Airport. (Note: Information on the Federal Aviation Administration's reasoning behind building height limitations can be read in their Advisory Circular, AC 150/5190-4A - A Model Zoning Ordinance to Limit Height of Objects Around Airports) The America Plaza trolley station is located on the ground floor of the building between the main building and the Museum of Contemporary Art San Diego's Downtown campus. The building's elevators are supplied by Mitsubishi Electric and travel at a little over 7 m/s (1400 fpm), making them the fastest in San Diego.

One America Plaza was purchased by the real estate development firm, Irvine Company, in February 2006 for US$300 million.

As of November 2025, the Irvine Company is reported as having sold the building to Saca Development for US$120 million.

== See also ==
- List of tallest buildings in San Diego
- List of tallest buildings in California
