= Virani =

Virani may refer to:

- Virani (surname), an Indian surname
- Virani (goddess) or Askini, in Hindu mythology, a wife of Daksha
- Virani Noordin, Ugandan cricketer
- Virani, Iran, a village in Razavi Khorasan Province, Iran
- Virani, Hamadan, or Virai, a village in Hamadan Province, Iran

== See also ==
- Viran, a name
- Vira (disambiguation)
- Veera (disambiguation)
