= Veer (disambiguation) =

The Veer is an option running play often associated with option offenses in American football. Veer may also refer to:

== Film and television ==
- Veer!, a 2012 American independent film directed by Patrick Barry
- Veer (2010 film), a Bollywood film starring Mithun Chakraborty, Salman Khan and Jackie Shroff
- Veer (1995 film), an Indian film
- Vivegam, also released as Veer, a 2017 Indian Tamil-language film by Siva

== People ==
- Naqeebullah Mehsud (1991–2018), also known as "Veer", a Pakistani national ethnic Pashtun who was killed in a fake police encounter
- Vinayak Damodar Savarkar (1883-1966), self-titled "Veer" meaning "brave", the father of Hindu nationalism
- Rinku Singh (wrestler) (born 1988), a professional wrestler with the ring name Veer

== Others ==
- Veer Towers, condominium buildings in Paradise, Nevada
- HP Veer, a 2011 smartphone by Hewlett-Packard
- INS Veer (K82), a Vidyut-class missile boat of the Indian Navy
- INS Veer (K40), a Veer-class corvette of the Indian Navy
- VeeR VR, a Chinese technology company headquartered in Beijing, focused on virtual reality contents
- One of Navarasa, in Indian aesthetics and literature

== See also ==
- VIR (disambiguation)
- Veera (disambiguation)
- Veeram (disambiguation)
- Veeru (Sholay), a fictional character played by Dharmendra in the classic 1975 Indian film Sholay
- Veering, a movement of the air; see Warm front § Characteristics
