= Veeranna =

Veeranna may refer to:

- Gubbi Veeranna (1890–1974), Indian theatre director
- Veerannapalem, a village and a panchayat located in the Parchur mandal of the Prakasam district, Andhra Pradesh, India
- Veerannapeta, a village in Kondurg mandal of Mahbubnagar district, Telangana, India
- Veeranna (film), a 2005 Indian Tamil-language drama film

== See also ==
- Veera (disambiguation)
