= CityCenter =

Mixed-use urban complex in Paradise, Nevada, U.S.

- Former CityCenter logo, 2010

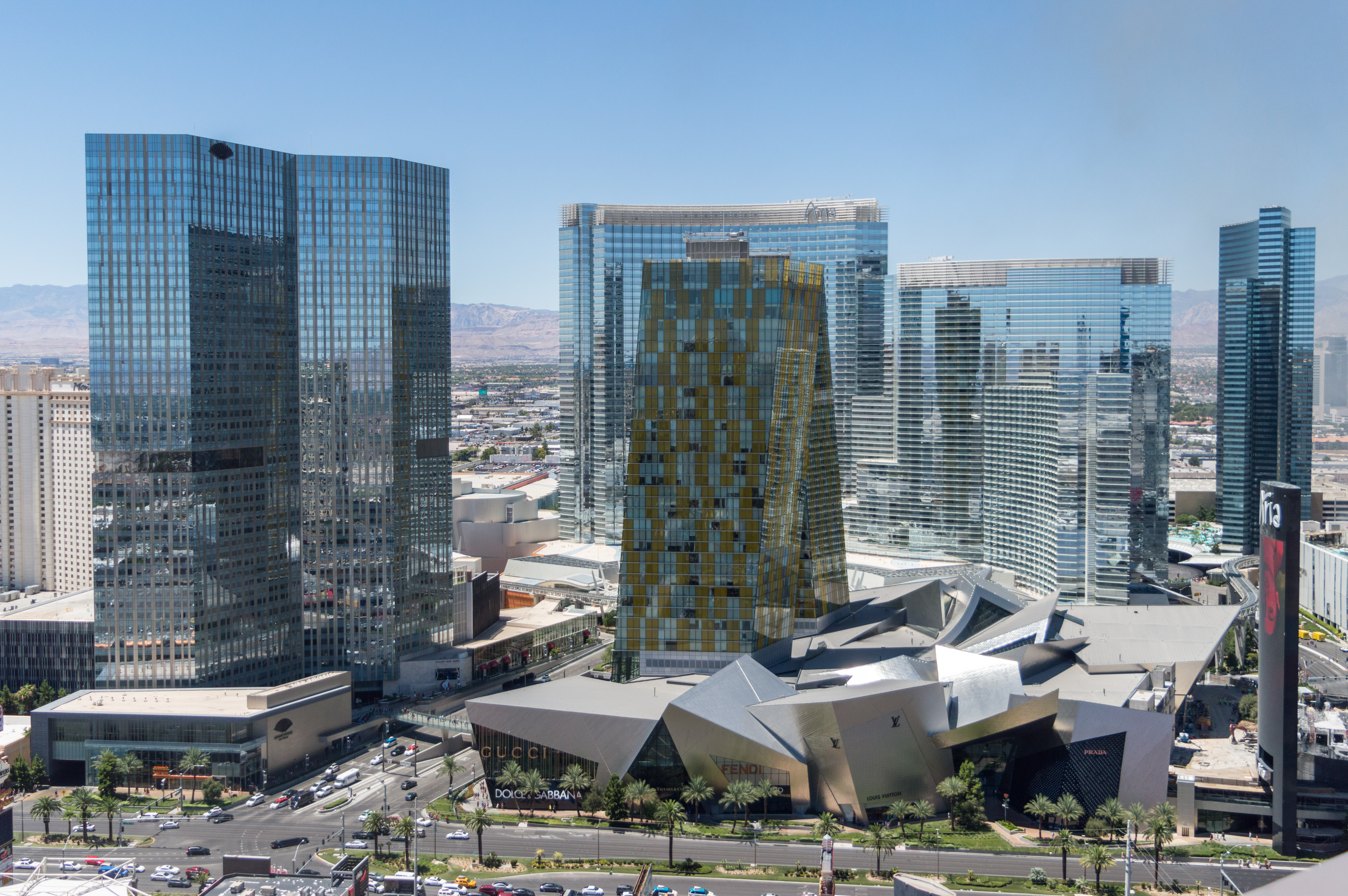
- CityCenter complex in 2015, seen from the roof terrace of Marriott's Grand Chateau. From left to right: Waldorf Astoria, Crystals, Aria, Veer Towers, and Vdara.

Project
- Opening date: December 2, 2009; 16 years ago
- Developer: MGM Resorts International and Dubai World
- Architect: Various: AAI Architects, Inc. (architect of record) Ehrenkrantz Eckstut & Kuhn (master plan) Gensler (executive architect) Foster and Partners (The Harmon) Helmut Jahn (Veer Towers) Kohn Pedersen Fox (Mandarin Oriental) Pelli Clark Pelli (Aria) Daniel Libeskind and David Rockwell (Crystals) Rafael Viñoly (Vdara)
- Operator: MGM Resorts International (Aria and Vdara)
- Owner: The Blackstone Group (Aria and Vdara); Invesco and Simon Property Group (Crystals); Tiffany Lam and Andrew and Peggy Cherng (Waldorf Astoria); Brett Torino and Flag Luxury Group (63)
- Website: aria.mgmresorts.com

Physical features
- Major buildings: Aria, Crystals, The Harmon (demolished), Waldorf Astoria, Vdara, Veer Towers, 63
- Transport: Aria Express (tram)

Location
- Location within Las Vegas Strip Location within Nevada Location within the United States
- Coordinates: 36.107725°N 115.17574°W
- Country: United States
- State: Nevada
- City: Las Vegas
- Area: Las Vegas Strip
- Address: South Las Vegas Boulevard (Note: Most of CityCenter's properties have Las Vegas Boulevard addresses, while Vdara is located on nearby Harmon Avenue.); Paradise, Nevada, United States

Aria Campus, commonly known by its former name CityCenter, is a mixed-use, urban complex on the Las Vegas Strip in Paradise, Nevada. It is located on 67 acres (27 ha) and contains a total of 18-million sq ft (1,700,000 m^{2}). The complex includes Aria Resort and Casino, the Vdara condo-hotel, the Waldorf Astoria Las Vegas hotel and condominiums, the Veer Towers condominiums, and a mall known as The Shops at Crystals. Another hotel and condo project, The Harmon, never opened due to construction defects; the site was redeveloped as another shopping mall, known as 63 CityCenter.

CityCenter was developed by MGM Mirage and Dubai World. The project was conceived by MGM president and chief financial officer Jim Murren, who envisioned an urban district for Las Vegas, similar to Greenwich Village or Haight-Ashbury. MGM announced CityCenter on November 9, 2004. Ehrenkrantz Eckstut & Kuhn Architects spent 20 months working with MGM on the master plan. Numerous architects, assembled by Gensler, were hired to work on individual components of CityCenter. The project received LEED Gold certifications for its environmentally friendly designs.

Construction of CityCenter began on June 25, 2006, with Perini Building Company as general contractor. A year later, Dubai World joined MGM as a partner on the project. Six workers died during construction, eventually prompting others to walk off the job in June 2008. Construction resumed the next day, after Perini agreed to improved safety demands. Dubai World later threatened to withhold further financing due to cost overruns, before reaching an agreement with MGM. CityCenter was completed at a cost of $8.5 billion, making it the most expensive privately funded construction project in U.S. history.

Vdara was the first property to open at CityCenter, debuting on December 2, 2009. Other properties opened later that month, while Veer Towers was completed in 2010. Aria is considered the central feature of CityCenter, and it includes the only casino at the complex. By 2019, CityCenter had been renamed Aria Campus.

MGM has sold off several of its CityCenter properties, including Crystals in 2016, the Mandarin Oriental hotel (now Waldorf Astoria) in 2018, and the former Harmon site in 2021. Later that year, MGM bought out Dubai World's ownership stake, gaining full control of Aria and Vdara, its last remaining properties at the complex. Both were sold in 2021, although MGM continues to operate them.

== History ==
CityCenter was conceived by Jim Murren, president and chief financial officer of MGM Mirage, while development was overseen by MGM executive Bobby Baldwin. MGM had considered several different themed hotels for the site in the early 2000s, but none attracted high enthusiasm. The company later sought out a unique project idea for the land, different to anything that had been done before in Las Vegas.

Murren began considering the concept of a mixed-use project in 2003. He created detailed architectural plans with help from Bill Smith, an architect who served as president of the subsidiary MGM Mirage Design Group. Murren presented his idea to MGM's board in March 2004. Kirk Kerkorian, majority shareholder in MGM, was convinced of the project's viability early on. Other board members were intrigued by Murren's proposal, but also skeptical. With CityCenter, Murren sought to create an urban gathering place for Las Vegas. The large project would be the first of its kind for the area. According to Murren, "No one has embarked on a development [of this scale] in this town. It's hard to equate it to anything. We are going to be leaders in the reshaping of the valley into a global market".

MGM announced the project, known then as Project CityCenter, on November 9, 2004. The company had spent eight months working on development plans for the site. The mixed-use project would include a casino resort, three boutique hotels, condominiums, retail space, and restaurants. MGM would work with developers and consultants specialized in each of these industries. The company also held discussions with a dozen hotel operators, seeking managers for CityCenter's hotels.

=== Construction ===
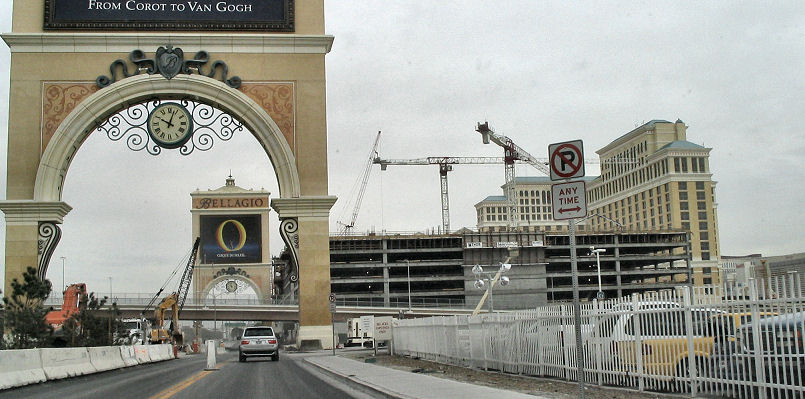
Construction of Bellagio's new parking garage, March 2006

CityCenter was built on 67 acres (27 ha) on the Las Vegas Strip, in between MGM's Monte Carlo and Bellagio resorts. The Boardwalk hotel-casino, also owned by MGM, occupied eight acres of the site.

Much of the land for CityCenter had previously been occupied by the golf course for the Dunes hotel-casino, which closed in 1993. At the time of CityCenter's announcement, most of the site was now being used as employee parking for the Bellagio. Before construction could begin on CityCenter, a new parking garage had to be constructed for Bellagio employees along Frank Sinatra Drive. Early site work had begun by August 2005, with Perini Building Company as general contractor for the parking garage and CityCenter.

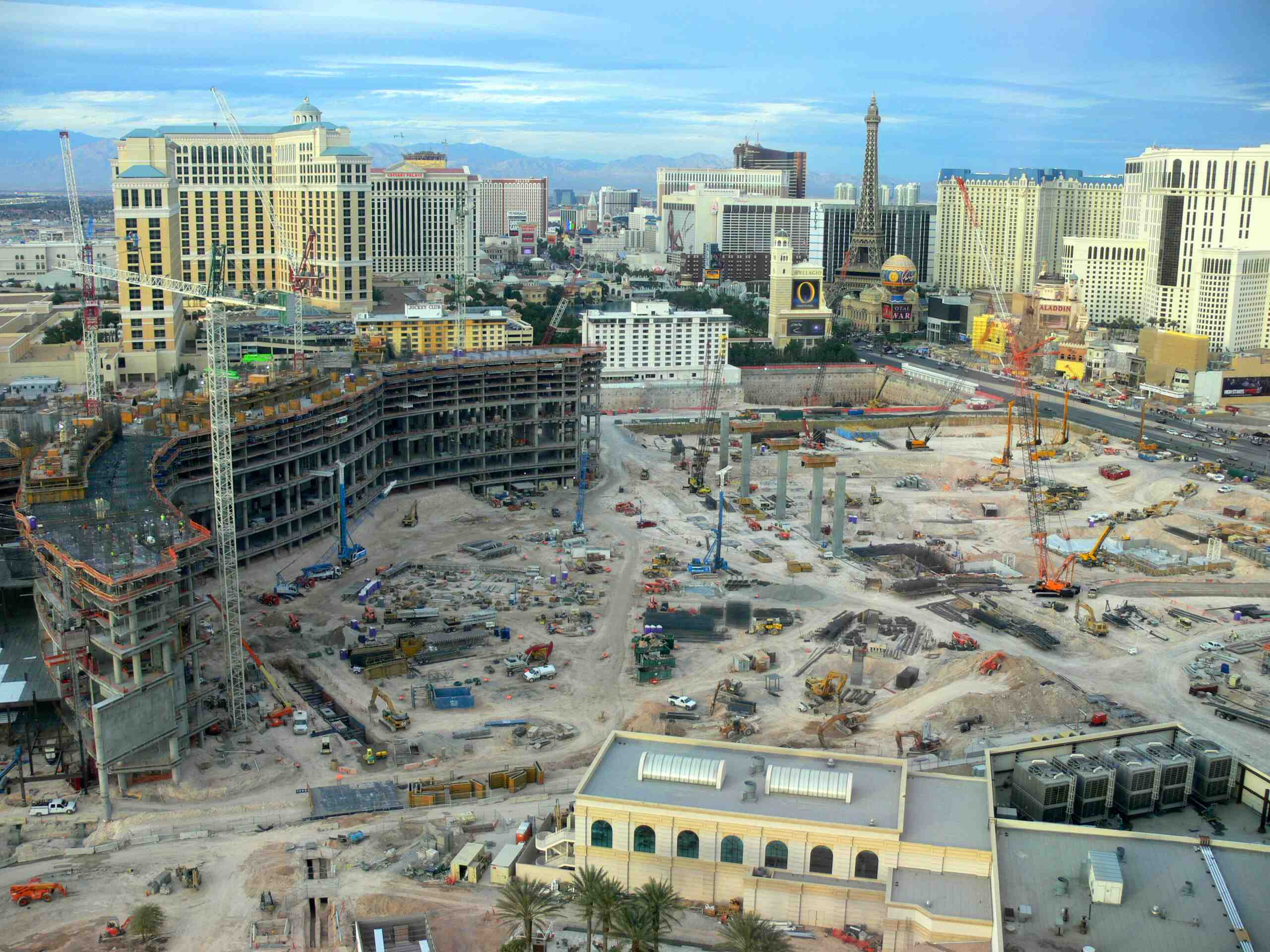

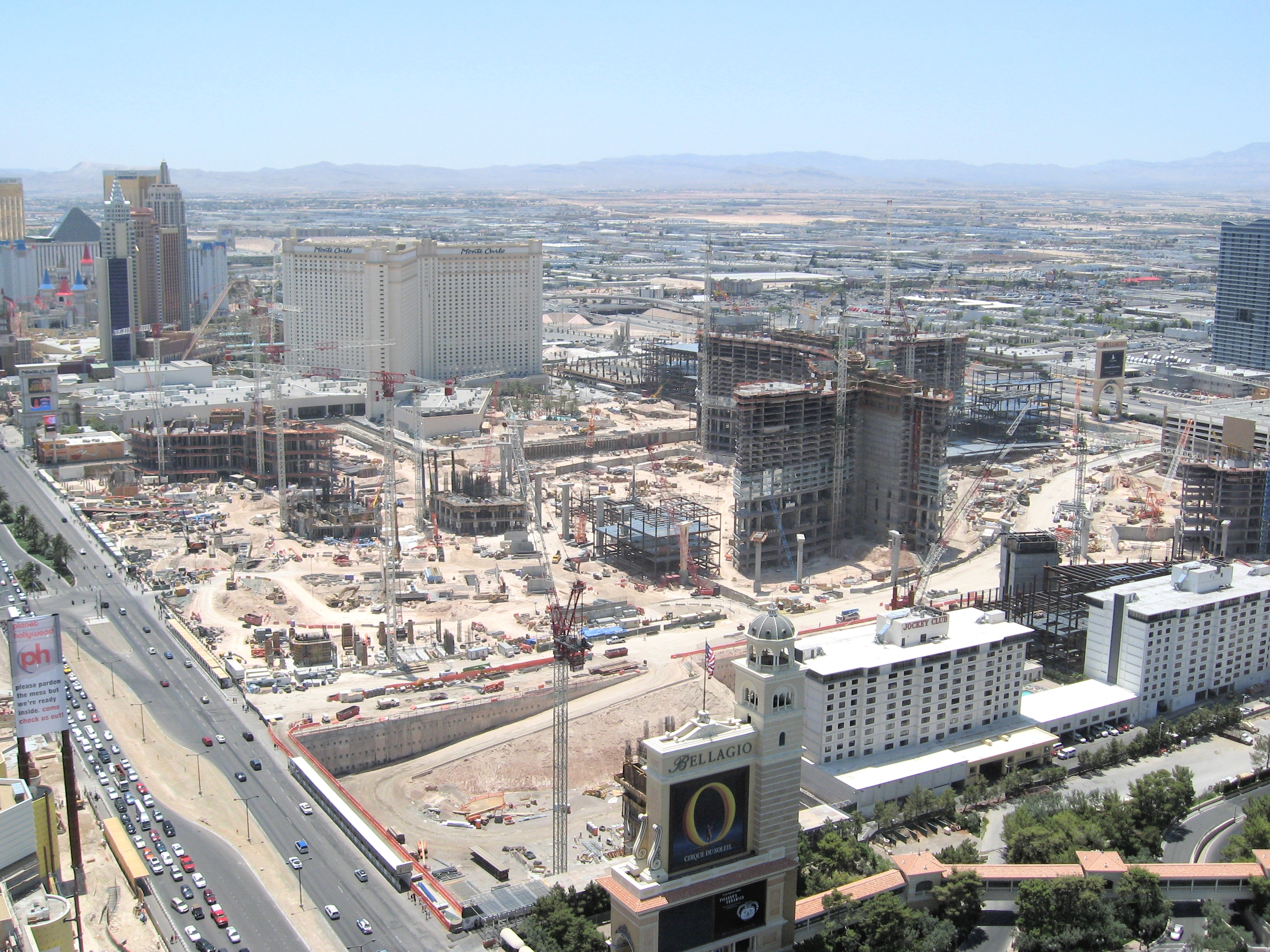
CityCenter construction during 2007

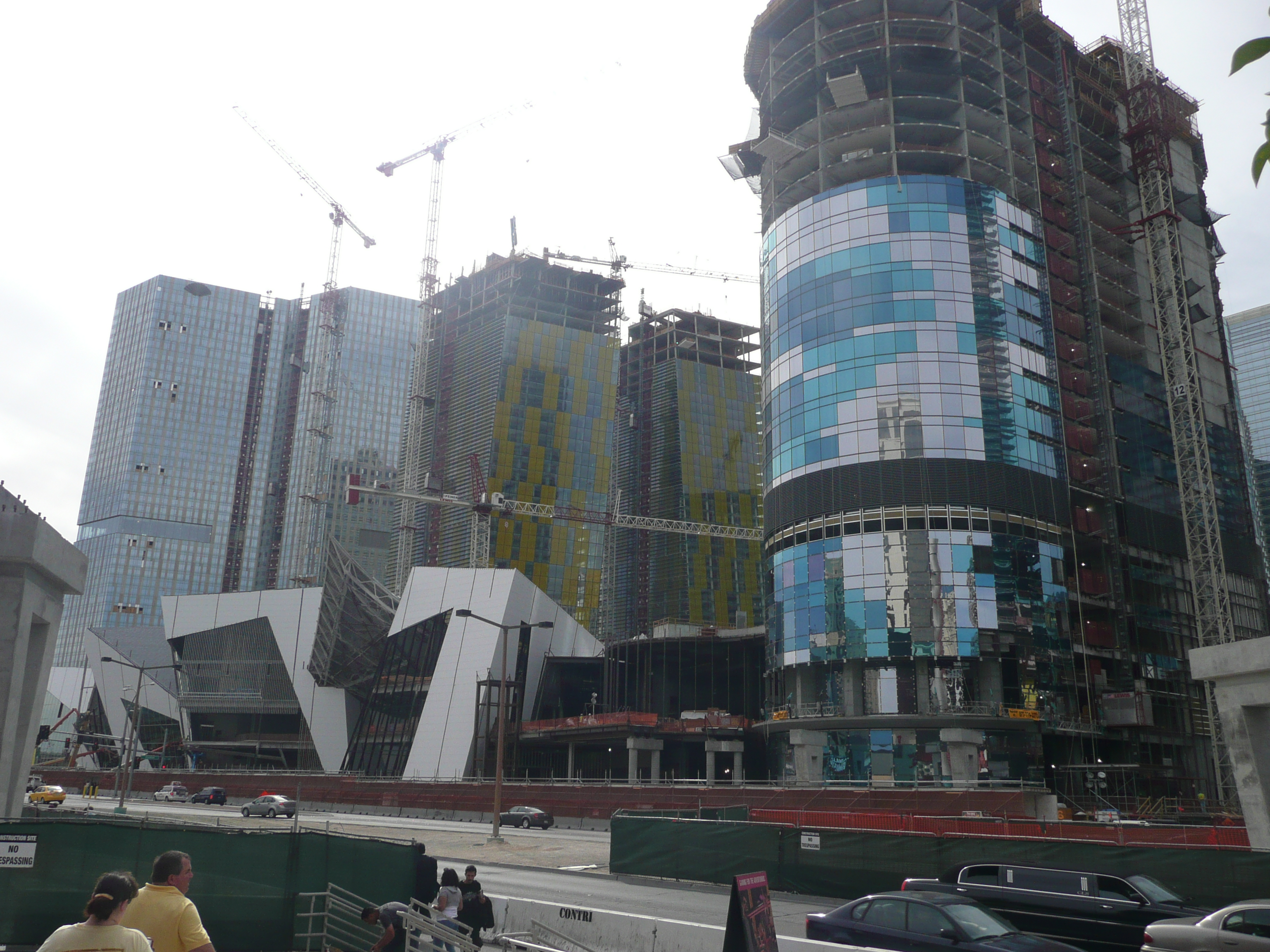
Construction in February 2009

The Boardwalk was closed in January 2006, and imploded four months later to make way for CityCenter. Construction of CityCenter began on June 25, 2006, with a concrete pour forming the foundation for the future Aria Resort and Casino. The construction site was divided into three blocks, each with their own team of workers. With no on-site storage, the construction schedule and delivery of materials had to be carefully planned.

Six deaths occurred during construction. In February 2007, a 3,000 lb (1,400 kg) steel wall used as a concrete mold fell from a crane, hitting another wall which struck four workers, killing two. In August 2007, a worker died when the counterweight for a construction elevator came down on him as he oiled the machine. Two months later, a worker fell approximately 50 ft (15 m) while working on the Aria tower. In April 2008, a worker fell approximately 20 ft (6 m). The next month, a worker was crushed and killed when caught between the counter-weight system and the track of a crane. The project was nicknamed CityCemetery in response to the deaths. Other practices by workers caused concern, with some drinking before work in violation of Perini's company rules.

The deaths at CityCenter – in addition to those at other upcoming Strip resorts – prompted its construction workers to walk off the job at midnight on June 3, 2008, protesting safety conditions and shutting down construction. The Southern Nevada Building and Construction Trades Council demanded that Perini take three steps before work could resume: agree to pay for additional safety training for workers, allow national union researchers to examine root causes of safety problems on the site, and allow union leaders full access to the work site. An agreement was reached within a day, putting an end to the walkout. However, the work stoppage prompted the Occupational Safety and Health Administration to launch an investigation into the project's construction safety on June 9, 2008.

As of August 2008, the project had 7,700 construction workers, operating in shifts on a 24-hour basis. As a result of delays, MGM assigned its executive construction manager, Tishman Construction Corporation, to aid Perini starting in late 2008. At that time, CityCenter had up to 9,500 construction workers at a daily cost of $3.5 million. More than 50 million hours were spent building CityCenter, which had more workers than the construction of Hoover Dam.

=== Financing ===
CityCenter was initially expected to cost $5 billion, to be financed partially through condominium presales. By 2006, the project's budget had increased to $7 billion, due to several additions, including a monorail connecting throughout CityCenter. The rising cost of construction materials and labor also contributed to the increased budget. In 2007, Dubai World became a joint partner in the project. Numerous last-minute design changes took place during construction, continually raising the budget. By 2008, the project's cost had increased to more than $8 billion. The budget continued to fluctuate, reaching $9.2 billion later that year, before settling at $8.5 billion. It is the most expensive privately funded construction project in U.S. history.

In March 2009, Dubai World sued MGM, accusing the latter of mismanaging development at CityCenter, resulting in the cost overruns. The lawsuit placed the project in financial jeopardy, as a $220 million construction payment was due later that month and Dubai World declined to fund it. MGM covered Dubai World's portion of the payment, and the two came to an agreement the following month which would ensure the completion of CityCenter. MGM had contacted Nevada U.S. senator Harry Reid for help in saving the project. Reid, in turn, contacted bank CEOs and urged them to loan MGM money to continue construction.

=== Opening ===
The first of CityCenter's features, the Vdara condo-hotel, opened to the public on December 2, 2009, following a VIP event the night before. A retail mall, Crystals, opened on December 3, and the Mandarin Oriental hotel opened a day later. The openings were part of a three-day celebration marking CityCenter's debut. The project's primary attraction, Aria Resort and Casino, is the only gaming property on-site. It opened on December 16, 2009. Veer Towers, a condominium property, opened on July 15, 2010.

CityCenter opened amid the Great Recession, although Baldwin said the project would succeed despite the economic downturn. Murren expected CityCenter to be profitable within five to ten years, and said the complex would appeal to locals in addition to tourists. Mayor Oscar Goodman believed the project would help bring tourism to downtown Las Vegas. Analysts were mixed as to whether CityCenter would help boost the local economy. CityCenter sought to fill 12,000 job positions ahead of its opening, and more than 100,000 people applied as a result of the recession. Approximately half of the work force would consist of transfers from other MGM properties.

The project added around 5,900 hotel rooms at a time when Las Vegas tourism had declined. Initial profits were lower than MGM had hoped, and fine-tuning took place over the next year in response to customer feedback. In 2010, Aria and Vdara launched national advertising campaigns. CityCenter saw improvement by the end of 2012, in part because of reduced hotel rates.

=== Legal problems ===
One hotel and condominium project, The Harmon, was scheduled to open at the end of 2009 with the rest of CityCenter. However, structural defects were discovered the year before, leading to litigation with Perini, as well as the project's cancellation and eventual demolition in 2015. Numerous other construction discrepancies were found throughout CityCenter, and MGM said they would be corrected by the time of opening.

In March 2010, Perini sued MGM and Dubai World for $492 million in unpaid construction costs, relating primarily to its work on the Harmon. Perini also filed a mechanic's lien against the project. A coalition – including Perini, subcontractors, and several trade unions – was also formed against MGM. MGM, in part, disputed the case because of defective work on the Harmon. The company also questioned the billing amount and sought a detailed accounting from Perini, seeking to eliminate charges that may have already been paid off.

In May 2010, Perini requested Nevada governor Jim Gibbons to open an investigation into MGM's lack of payment and its financial situation, as the company was struggling amid the recession. By that time, various subcontractors had filed more than 430 liens. MGM began settling with subcontractors later that year.

Some analysts believed that construction costs and issues would have been managed better if CityCenter had been built in phases. However, Murren said he was against such an idea: "How do you create an environment in phases? What do you do? Create a beautiful casino resort and have signs around the rest of the campus saying, 'Coming Soon'? You just can't do that".

=== Recent developments ===
In 2016, MGM and Dubai World sold Crystals for $1.1 billion to Invesco and Simon Property Group. Two years later, the Mandarin Oriental hotel was sold for $214 million to hotel investor Tiffany Lam and Panda Express founders Andrew and Peggy Cherng. It was rebranded under the Waldorf Astoria name.

By 2019, CityCenter had been renamed Aria Campus, after the Aria resort. The "Aria" name has also been applied to the Aria Express monorail, formerly "CityCenter Tram".

In 2021, MGM bought out Dubai World's interest for $2.1 billion, gaining full ownership of Aria and Vdara, its last remaining properties at CityCenter. MGM then sold the two resorts to The Blackstone Group. The latter leased the resorts back to MGM, which continues managing the resorts.

MGM also sold the Harmon site in 2021, to developers Brett Torino and Flag Luxury Group. A four-story shopping mall, known as 63 CityCenter, opened on the site in 2023.

== Design ==
Early design model of CityCenter, September 2005

CityCenter's master plan was designed by Ehrenkrantz Eckstut & Kuhn Architects, which spent 20 months working on the project with MGM Mirage Design Group. Unlike recent Las Vegas resorts which featured a theme, CityCenter was designed as a modern urban district, similar to Greenwich Village or Haight-Ashbury. Speaking about CityCenter in 2004, Murren said, "I think the era of themes have come and gone in Las Vegas. I think the word is 'feel.' It will have an urban feel that is contemporary, modern and forward-looking". The project was described as "a city within a city". According to Murren, "The great thing about a city is its diversity. It is vibrant and dynamic and has people of different backgrounds. Real cities have many different environments, like Manhattan. That's what I loved about the idea. We're not creating a fake city but a real one". Baldwin said, "We don't want to build things consumers want now. We want to build what they will want 10, 15, 50 years from now".

Gensler served as the executive architect, assembling a group of prominent designers who would work on individual components of CityCenter. Around 100 prospective architects were considered for the project, and this list was gradually narrowed down. The initial team of designers was announced in 2005, and others followed in 2006. Each of the architects were given a wide range of creative freedom, although their projects had to complement each other rather than outdo one another. A 100-unit residential tower with a twisting shape, designed by James K. M. Cheng, was removed during the design phase for more open space. An office building was also scrapped. AAI Architects, Inc. served as architect of record for several components of CityCenter.

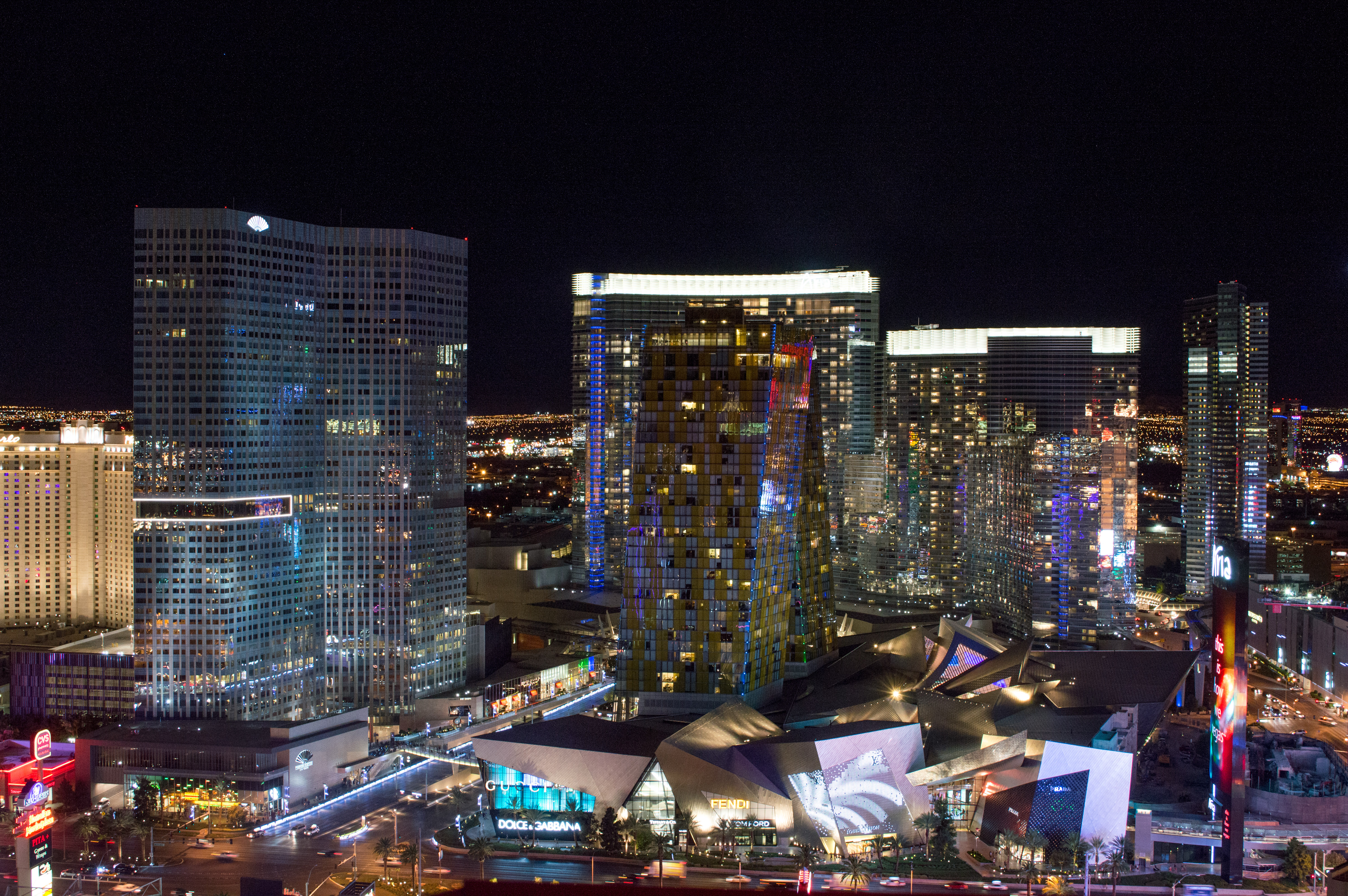
CityCenter at night

A defining feature of CityCenter is the use of glass paneling on each of its towers. The Cosmopolitan resort, located directly north, is sometimes mistaken as part of CityCenter due to its similar design. Visitors have also had difficulty distinguishing CityCenter's towers due to their shared design of glass paneling. The exterior also includes 80,000 sq ft (7,400 m^{2}) of stone from a quarry in nearby Jean, Nevada.

CityCenter received mixed reviews when it opened. Architecture critic Christopher Hawthorne opined that CityCenter's designers coated it with "a high-gloss, homogenous and faintly corporate sheen", stating that it is "wrapped in a series of shimmering mirrored-glass packages, making the place from certain angles look like a slightly less buttoned-up version" of Time Warner Center in Manhattan.

Paul Goldberger, architecture critic for The New Yorker, questioned MGM's goal in building CityCenter as a counterpoint to recent themed resorts, writing that "the underlying risk of the CityCenter project is that good buildings next to outlandish ones will look quiet and bland. Caesars Palace and its progeny are crass but iconic. The CityCenter buildings are sophisticated, but you wonder, finally, if they are all that memorable". Brock Radke of Las Vegas Weekly called the design "too subtle" for the Strip: "Its design demands that you seek it out, where other resorts leap unabashedly into the Vegas spotlight whenever possible". Sam Lubell of The Architect's Newspaper wrote, "For all CityCenter's flash, architecturally it is conservative and breaks little new ground." Lubell went on to call it an "architectural petting zoo; a collection of pretty objects with limited relationship to one another," writing further, "Urbanity as just a vague theme is a depressing concept. Instead, why not focus more on Vegas itself, with all its wackiness and complexity, as inspiration?"

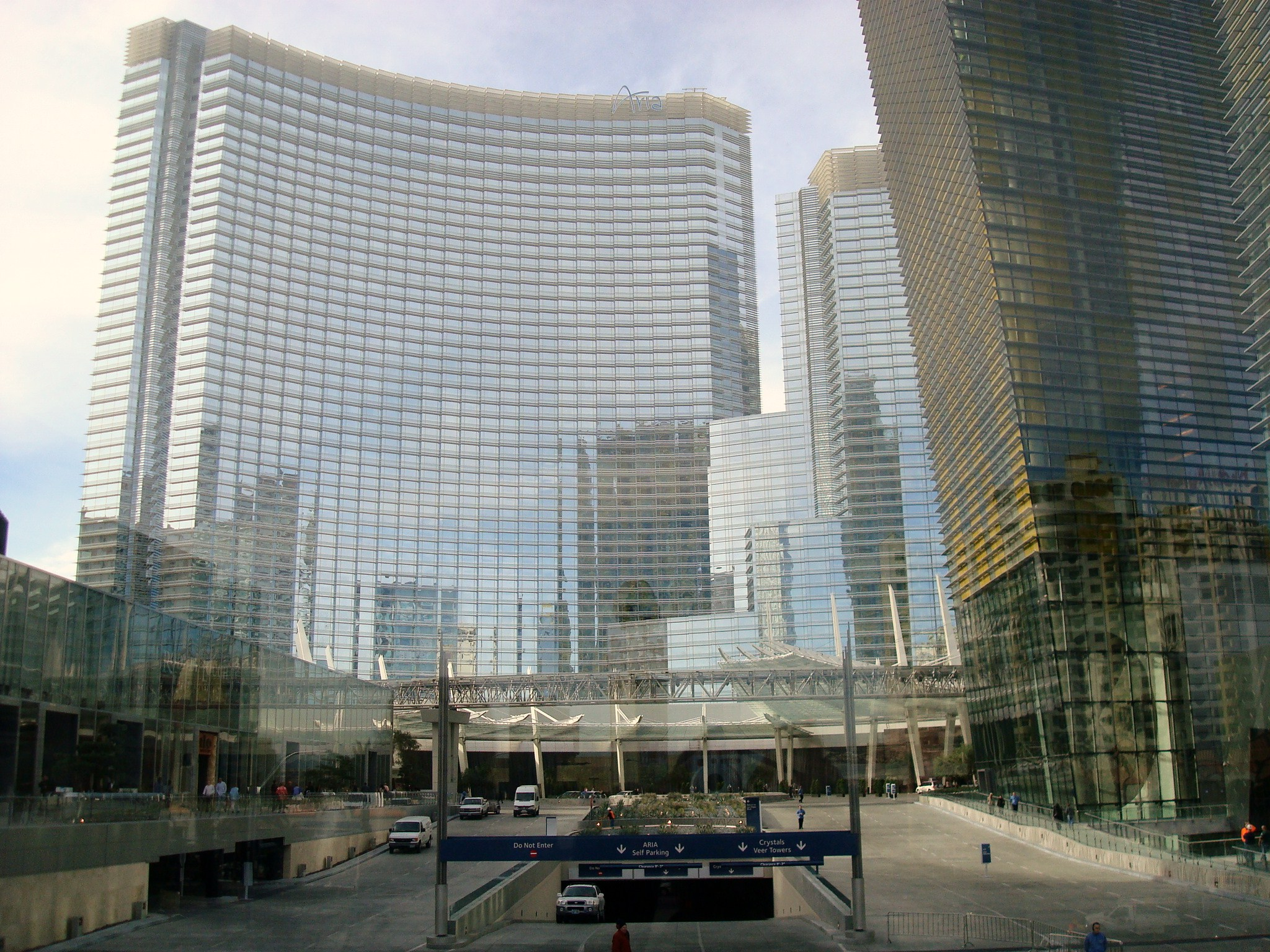
Roadway leading into CityCenter from the Strip, March 2010

CityCenter's main entrance along the Strip consists of a multi-lane roadway, while pedestrians enter along narrow walkways and overhead bridges. Architects were critical of the entry design, viewing it as bland and unattractive, while many pedestrians chose to pass by CityCenter as a result. Architect Alan Hess said, "The entrance has all the pleasantness of an airport terminal. There's a lot of concrete and ramps and other things that turn pedestrians off, and a sense of being channeled into an entryway". Las Vegas architect Joel Bergman called the entrance "cold" and "uninviting". Goldberger wrote that CityCenter "is laid out not for pedestrians but as a machine for moving vast numbers of cars efficiently. There are wide ramps coming off the Las Vegas Strip, auto turnarounds, and porte cochères—all good for traffic flow but hardly what you would call urban open space. [...] there is no pleasant place to walk, except inside the buildings". A year after CityCenter's opening, MGM added landscaping to the entry area and signs to help guide pedestrians onto the property.

== Environmental efforts ==
CityCenter was expected to be the state's top energy user. From its earliest planning stages, the project was intended to be environmentally friendly. Much of the debris from the imploded Boardwalk hotel was recycled as building material for CityCenter, including its foundation. All of CityCenter's original buildings, with the exception of the Harmon, received LEED Gold certification from the U.S. Green Building Council in 2009. Forest Stewardship Council also named it the best commercial project of the year in its designing and building awards.

Among CityCenter's environmental features is an 8.5-megawatt natural gas cogeneration plant. It is located on-site and provides partial electricity to CityCenter. The complex also opened with a 26-limo fleet, serving Aria and Vdara, that ran on compressed natural gas.

== Features ==
CityCenter contains approximately 18-million sq ft (1,700,000 m^{2}) of space across 67 acres (27 ha). It includes approximately 6,800 rooms and condominiums.

indicates a structure that was demolished.

Name	Image	Floors	Hotel rooms	Condos	Architect	LEED certification	Notes
Aria		50 (Note: Due to gambler superstitions, floors 13 and 40-49 are skipped, with the top floor labeled as "61".)	4,004	0	Pelli Clark Pelli	Gold	The Aria Resort & Casino is CityCenter's central feature. It includes the only casino at CityCenter, with 150,000 sq ft (14,000 m^{2}) of gaming space.
Crystals		3	0	0	Studio Daniel Libeskind and Rockwell Group	Gold	Crystals is CityCenter's 500,000 sq ft (46,000 m^{2}) retail and entertainment district.
The Harmon		28	400	207	Foster and Partners	N/A	The Harmon was originally planned as a 49-story hotel and condominium tower, and was scheduled to open in late 2009 with the rest of CityCenter. However, structural defects were discovered in 2008, prompting MGM to cancel the condominium aspect and top the building off at 28 stories. MGM rescheduled the opening for late 2010, but later chose to demolish the building due to the defects. Demolition took place from 2014 to 2015, following years of litigation with Perini.
Waldorf Astoria		47	389	225	Kohn Pedersen Fox	Gold	Originally opened as a Mandarin Oriental hotel, it was sold in 2018 and became part of the Waldorf Astoria chain. It occupies the former site of the Boardwalk hotel-casino.
Vdara		57	1,495	0	Rafael Viñoly	Gold	Vdara is a hotel-condo tower.
Veer Towers		37	0	670	Helmut Jahn	Gold	Veer Towers consists of twin condominium towers that lean in opposite directions at a five-degree angle. It is the only component of CityCenter that is dedicated solely to residential space.
63 CityCenter		4	0	0	N/A	N/A	A shopping complex with 228,278 sq ft (21,207.7 m^{2}), built on the former Harmon site and opened in 2023.

=== Condominiums ===
CityCenter includes 2,440 condominiums, which were included to take advantage of a condominium boom in Las Vegas. Initial plans called for CityCenter to include 1,650 condo units. By 2006, this had been increased to nearly 2,800 units, following MGM's market research indicating strong demand. MGM formed CityCenter Realty Corporation to oversee condominium sales, and opened a residential sales pavilion in January 2007, featuring model units. The temporary structure cost $24 million. Preview galleries were also opened at MGM's Bellagio and Mirage resorts.

CityCenter would include condo hotel units, giving owners the option to rent them out. Murren believed that the project's residential element would appeal to baby boomers. Gaming analysts expressed skepticism about the success of CityCenter's condominiums, citing the large number of residential units already planned for the Strip. By 2007, many condo projects in Las Vegas had been canceled as the boom came to an end. As a result, MGM installed a live webcam overlooking the CityCenter construction site, hoping to convince prospective buyers of the project's viability. Initial condo sales at CityCenter showed a high level of interest among buyers.

In 2008, amid the Great Recession, MGM opened a sales office in Dubai to attract international buyers. MGM initially declined buyer requests to lower condo prices in 2009, noting unpredictable economic conditions. Later that year, MGM partnered with PennyMac Financial Services to create a financing program for buyers, helping them close escrow on their units. More than 500 buyers signed up for the program. MGM also agreed to lower condo prices by 30 percent. In addition, buyers at Vdara were offered cheaper units at Veer Towers instead.

Condo prices at CityCenter ranged from $500,000 to $9 million. Sales began closing escrow in January 2010, although initial closings were low. Within three months, only 25 unit sales had been finalized out of 2,400. Sales picked up later in the year, beating expectations despite the poor economic conditions.

=== Other features ===
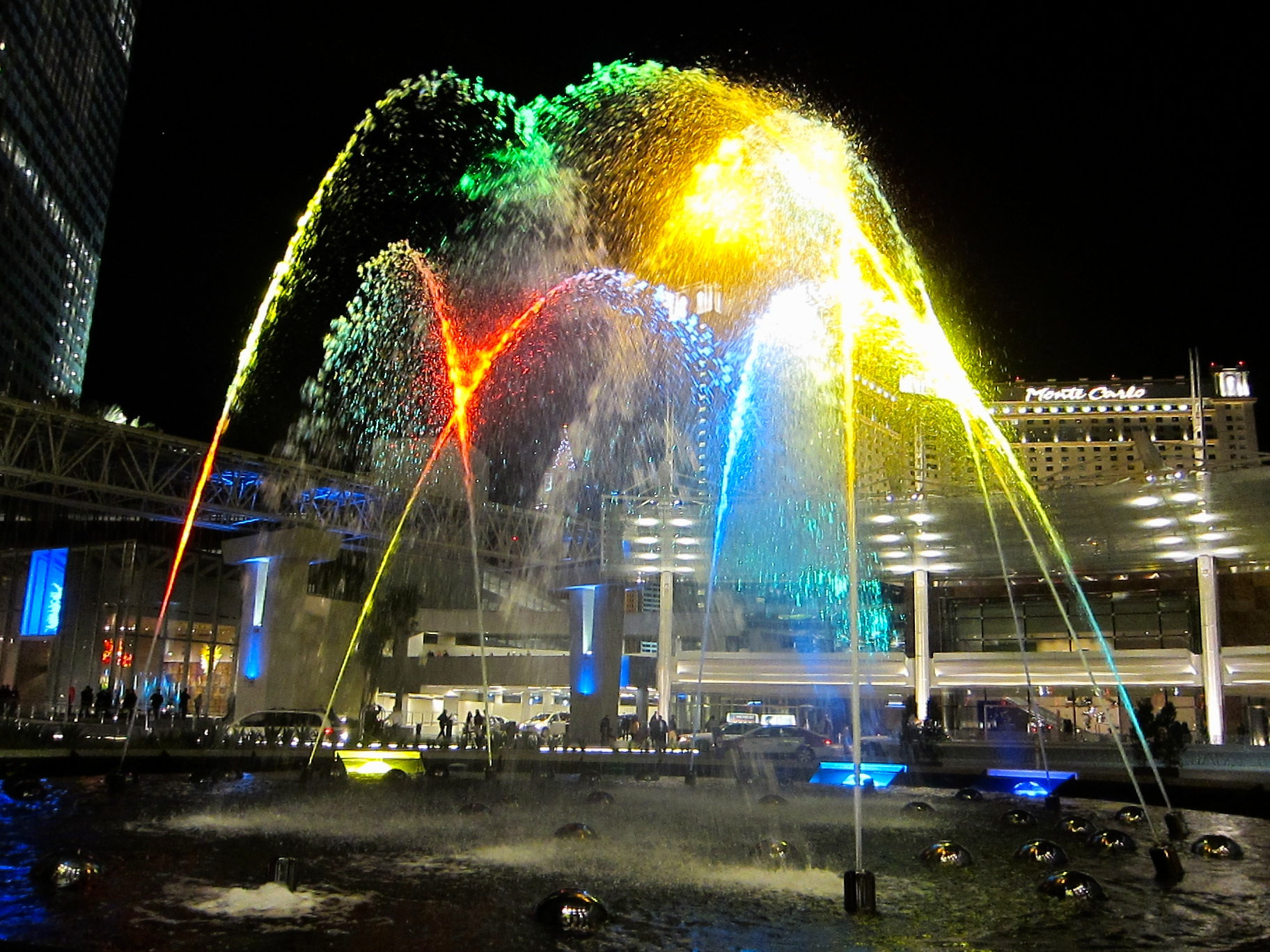
A fountain by WET, located in the traffic circle at Aria's main entrance

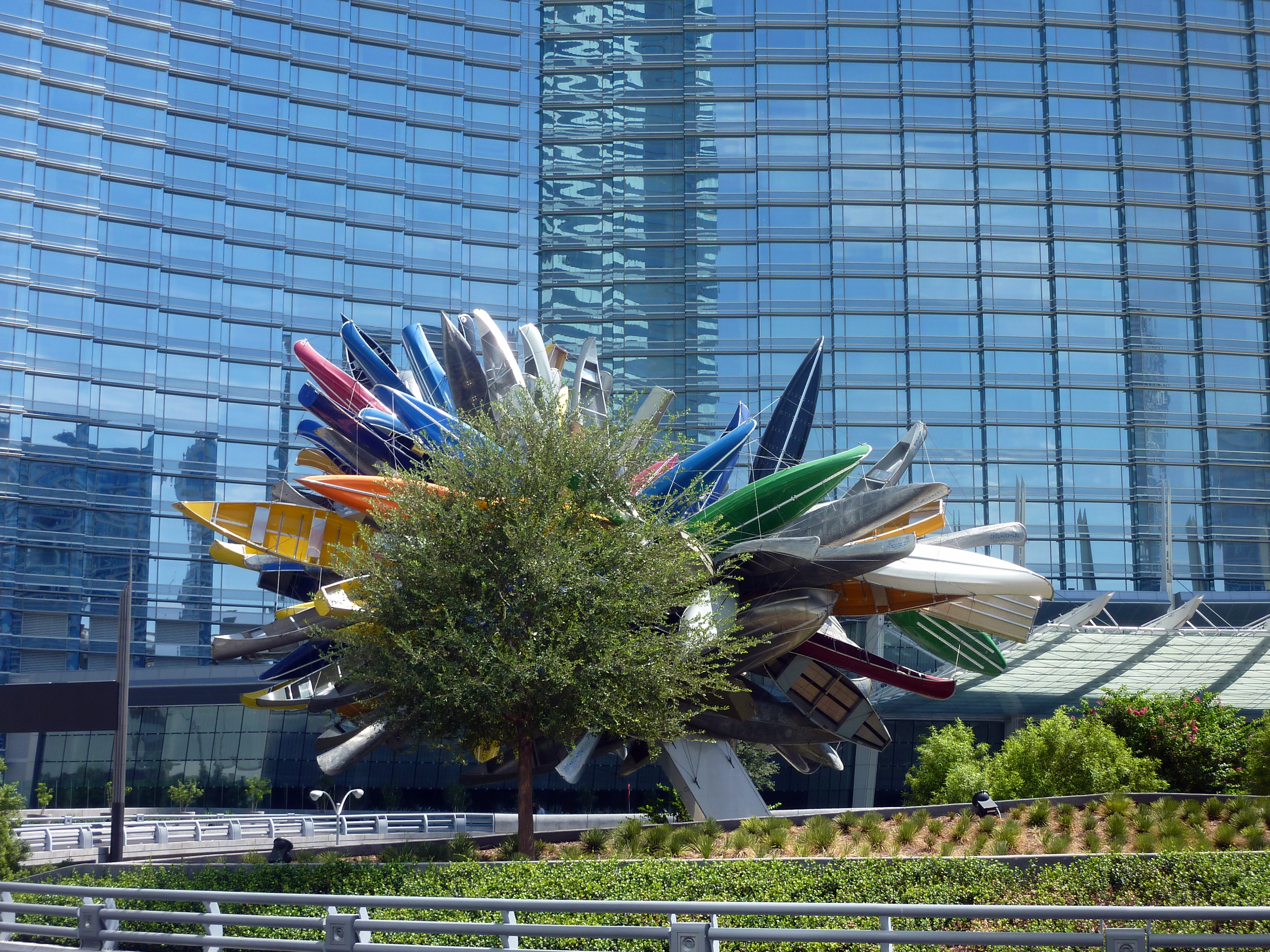
An art installation by Nancy Rubins – made up of various boats – located along the traffic circle outside Vdara's entrance

CityCenter features numerous restaurants, many overseen by celebrity chefs. The complex also features five water attractions, designed by WET and located at Aria and Crystals.

CityCenter opened with more than 300,000 sq ft (28,000 m^{2}) of convention and meeting space, much of it located at Aria. CityCenter's only performance theater, located at Aria, closed in 2016 for a 200,000 sq ft (19,000 m^{2}) expansion of the resort's convention center. Vdara and Waldorf Astoria also include meeting space. The complex was technologically advanced upon its opening, featuring 100,000 automated devices throughout the property, some of which would be used to control various room features such as lighting.

Various public art installations, valued at approximately $40 million, are featured throughout CityCenter, in an effort to attract art tourists. Known as the Aria Fine Art Collection, (Note: Previously the CityCenter Fine Art Collection.) it includes work from more than a dozen artists, including Tony Cragg, Claes Oldenburg, and Richard Long.

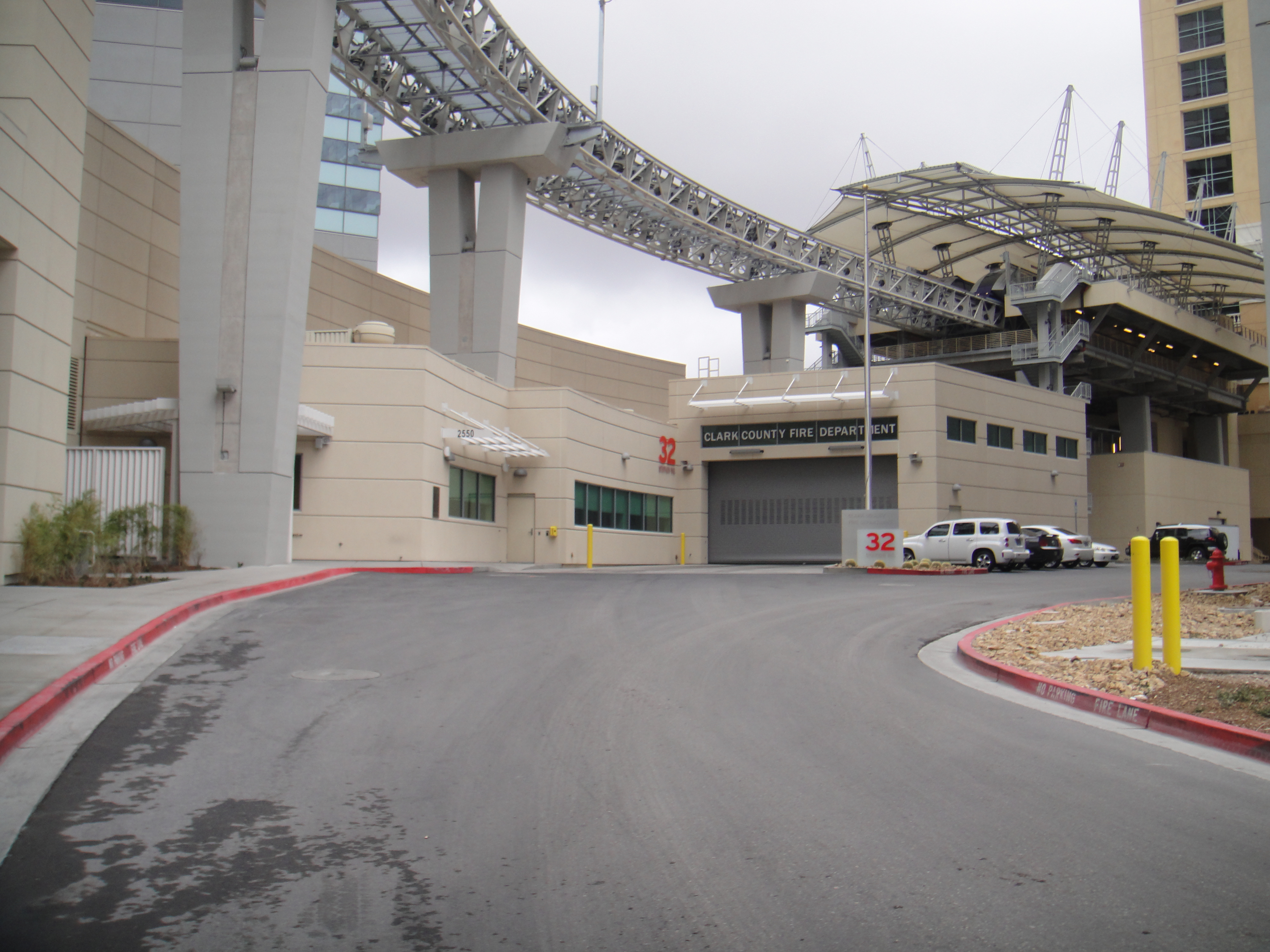
Station 32

As part of CityCenter, MGM agreed with the county to finance various infrastructure improvements outside of the project's property line. This would include road improvements to handle an increase in traffic coming to CityCenter once it opens. MGM would also build and finance an on-site fire station for the Clark County Fire Department. Station 32, a $28 million facility, opened next to Vdara on December 10, 2009. As of 2013, it was the busiest fire station in Las Vegas, handling many emergencies along the Strip.

== Transportation ==
Several measures were taken by MGM and the county to reduce traffic, including the construction of roundabouts in front of Aria and Vdara that connect to other CityCenter properties. A monorail, the Aria Express, also travels around CityCenter with stops at Bellagio and Park MGM (formerly Monte Carlo).

== See also ==
- Echelon Place, a canceled mixed-use complex planned for the Strip
- List of integrated resorts
