= Francisco González-Pulido =

Mexican architect

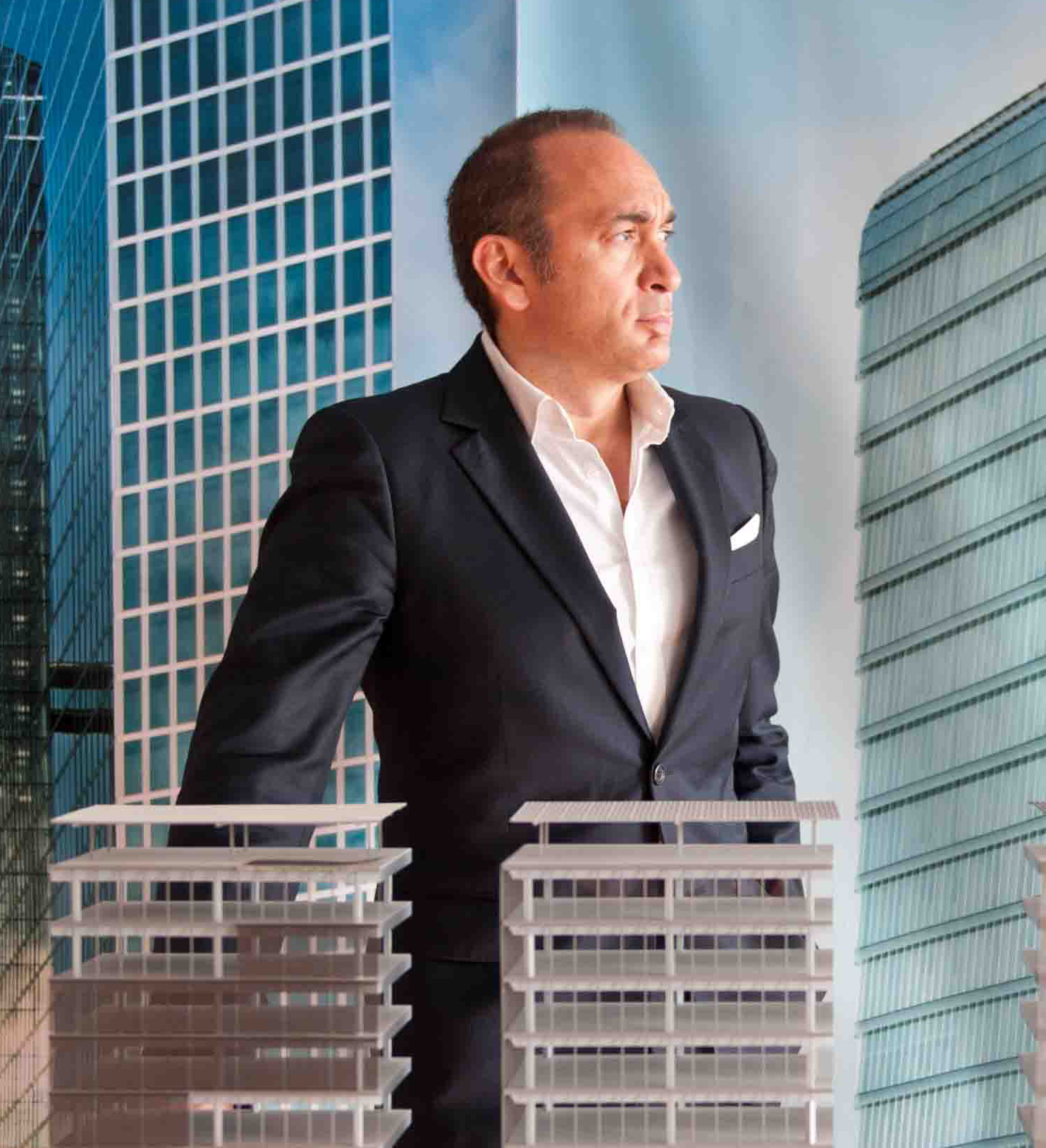
- Born: February 1970 (age 56); Mexico City
- Education: Instituto Tecnológico y de Estudios Superiores de Monterrey; Harvard University
- Occupation: Architect
- Awards: National Firm Award from the American Institute of Architects
- Buildings: Veer Towers

Francisco González-Pulido (born February 1970) is a Mexican architect. From 1992 to 1998, he worked predominately independently. In 1999, he joined the Chicago firm Murphy/Jahn Architects (which he later renamed JAHN in 2012). He has worked on a wide range of building typologies with a strong emphasis on the design of skyscrapers and airports in America, Europe, Asia, and the Middle East. After a long time working with Helmut Jahn, González-Pulido became the firm's first partner in 2009 and then president in 2012. In 2017, González-Pulido left JAHN to establish his own international architectural practice, FGP Atelier.

== Life and education ==
González-Pulido is a Mexican architect, born on February 13, 1970, in Mexico City. At the age of six he moved with his family to the north of Mexico.

Since childhood, he has always been interested in both art and technology, but during his early years he thought of becoming a rock and roll musician. To this date, he continues to compose and record on his own. He also collects both vintage guitars and amplifiers. As a teenager, he decided to enroll in school to be an architect, which he did when he was 17. He attended the Monterrey Institute of Technology and Higher Education from 1987 to 1991 and got his bachelor in the field of Architecture. After working on his own for a while, he went back to school because he wanted to learn more about cutting edge designs in order to work on bigger projects. From 1998 to 1999 he attended Harvard's School of Design and obtained his master's degree.

González-Pulido has been described as a man with "big personality" and "great ideas". He says that he was not an architect, he would have chosen to be a composer or a film director.

== Career ==
Soon after graduating from the Tec de Monterrey, he was hired to build a summer house, a project that gave him experience as both designer and builder; he gained knowledge, skill and reputation from that project and allowed him to participate in design competitions, winning one Price Waterhouse. Nevertheless, they withdrew the offer when they knew that he did not have a firm to complete the work.

During this time, he founded 2MX3, working as an independent architect in Mexico and the United States. Among his most important projects during that period are: U2 Studio in Dublin, the Casa Zárate and Museo M+M in Oaxaca, the Casa Palmas in Tamaulipas, the General Motors Centro Técnico S XXI in Mexico City. Even after being accepted into Harvard he continued working individually and during that time he was the recipient of the 1st place in an ideas competition organized by Vicente Fox which at that time was a candidate for the presidency of Mexico. González-Pulido project was called La Casa Sintética, defined as a modular prefabricated housing project, based on concepts of elastic space.

In 1999, after graduating from Harvard, González-Pulido moved to Chicago and began his collaboration with Murphy/Jahn. The firm is acknowledged as one of the most important in the world and Helmut Jahn one of Chicago's most influential architects. González-Pulido had heard of Jahn's collaborative concept of "Archi-Neering," combining engineering and architecture to create a symbiotic result through a synergetic process. His original plan was to work for the firm for a short time and move on. His vision, skills, leadership, drive and determination positioned him at the top and in 2003, he became executive vice president and then director of design from 2006 to 2012. With Murphy/Jahn, González-Pulido has worked on projects such as the DOHA Tower, Veer Towers, and Leatop Plaza.

After a series of successful projects and in close collaboration with Helmut Jahn, he became Jahn's first partner in 2009. In 2012 he was named president of the firm, in charge of design, management, operations and business development.

González-Pulido indicates that he likes to be hands-on and work with contractors, manufacturers and clients to solve problems. In addition to creating mega-projects, he also works designing furniture to match the architecture of the building where the pieces are located. One common element in this work is transparency to make a better connection with the building's environment. For example, the furniture used at an ecological hotel in Hong Kong, a tower in Qatar and the Ethnobotanical Garden in Oaxaca.

After founding FGP Atelier, González-Pulido focused on Tecnano (30,000 M2 Nanotechnology Lab and Corporate Accelerator at Monterey Tec that will be completed in 2020), Shenzhen Gate (240,000 M2 200M tall office and retail complex under construction that will be completed in 2018), Land Rover HQ Shanghai (200,000 M2 office and retail complex under construction that will be completed in 2018), [null Shanghai International Financial Center (550,000 M2 220 M tall headquarters, office, exhibition, and trading complex under construction that will be completed in 2018),] Guangzhou International Cultural Center (GICC) (150,000 M2 320 M tall office building that will be completed in 2020), and the Rectoria at Monterey Tec (a renovation of the historic administration building to be completed in 2018).

In March 2019, the Estadio Alfredo Harp Helú, designed by González-Pulido and FGP Atelier in collaboration with local architect Taller ADG, opened to acclaim in Mexico City.

== Influences and style ==
González-Pulido has stated that he has admired his mentor's work since he was a student in Mexico, and that he has much common ground with him. However, he admits that they share a good dose of creative tension that makes the collaboration rewarding.

González-Pulido does not believe in styles, trends or trying to conform to any particular aesthetic preconceptions, be it from formulas or culture. He believes that trying to follow or start a trend creates a bad result. Instead, he works to find a unique solution to a unique problem aiming for beauty as a result of a harmonious combination of experimental, essential and evolving design criteria. He thinks in terms of sequence and scenarios, placing himself at the center of the problem and the solution and believes that building light is not only a theoretical but an ethical position.

Lightness is a recurrent topic in his lectures, writings and design. He has related lightness to the aesthetics and physics of the minimal, the search for boundaries. His preoccupation to create responsive architecture has led him to design energy efficient buildings that have superseded energy standards. In the initial phases of design, he reads and writes extensively. The ideas are developed in the form of physical models and 3D digital studies. Drawing is done only when he has a clear idea of what he wants to do.

The first project that González-Pulido directed completely with his own vision with Murphy/Jahn was the Veer Towers in Las Vegas, which has been noted for its bold, unconventional design. He called the Veer Towers a "mix of utopia, surrealism and great ambition…".

== Completed projects ==
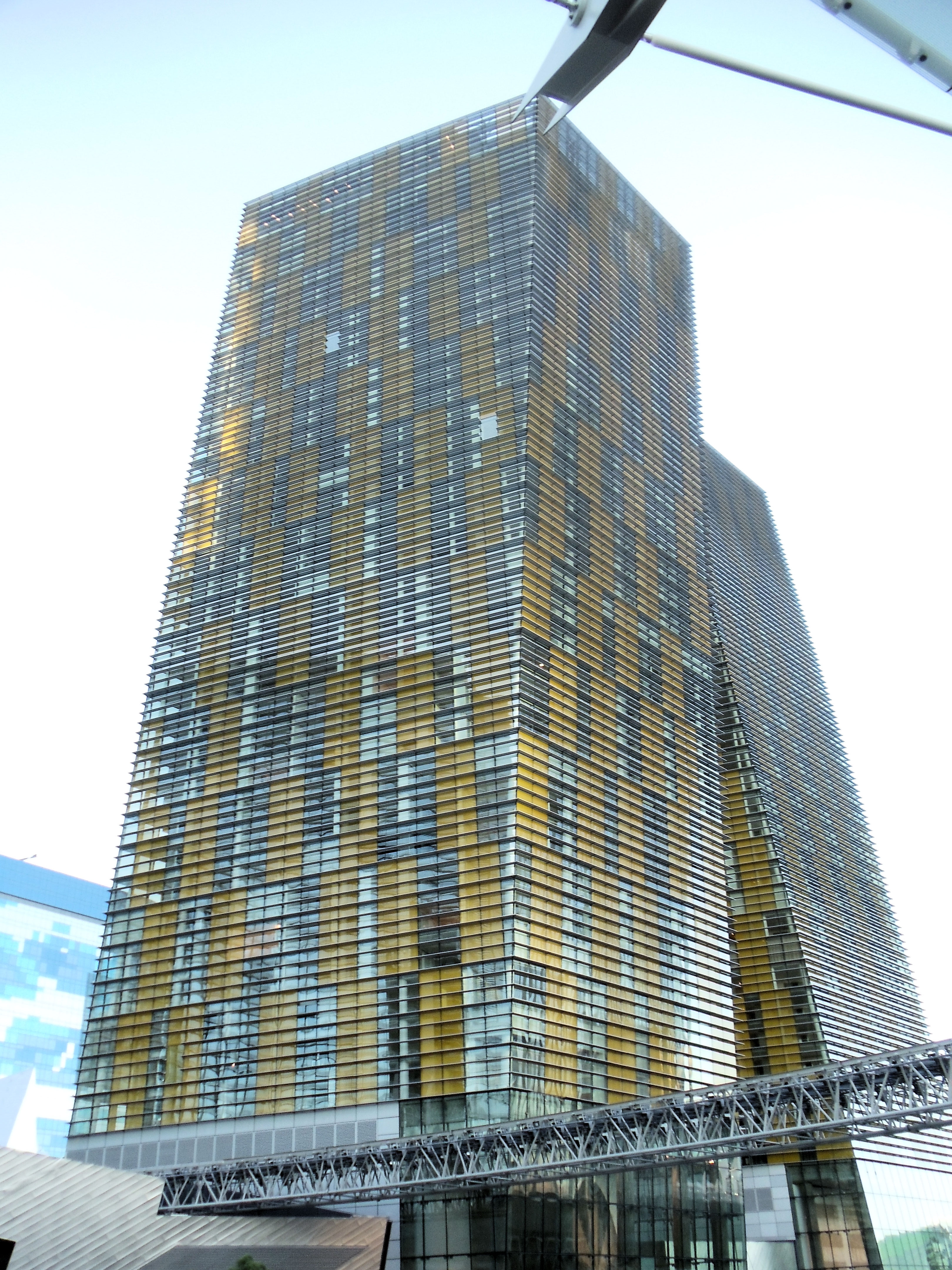
Veer Towers, Las Vegas, USA

Selected completed projects from 2000 to 2012:

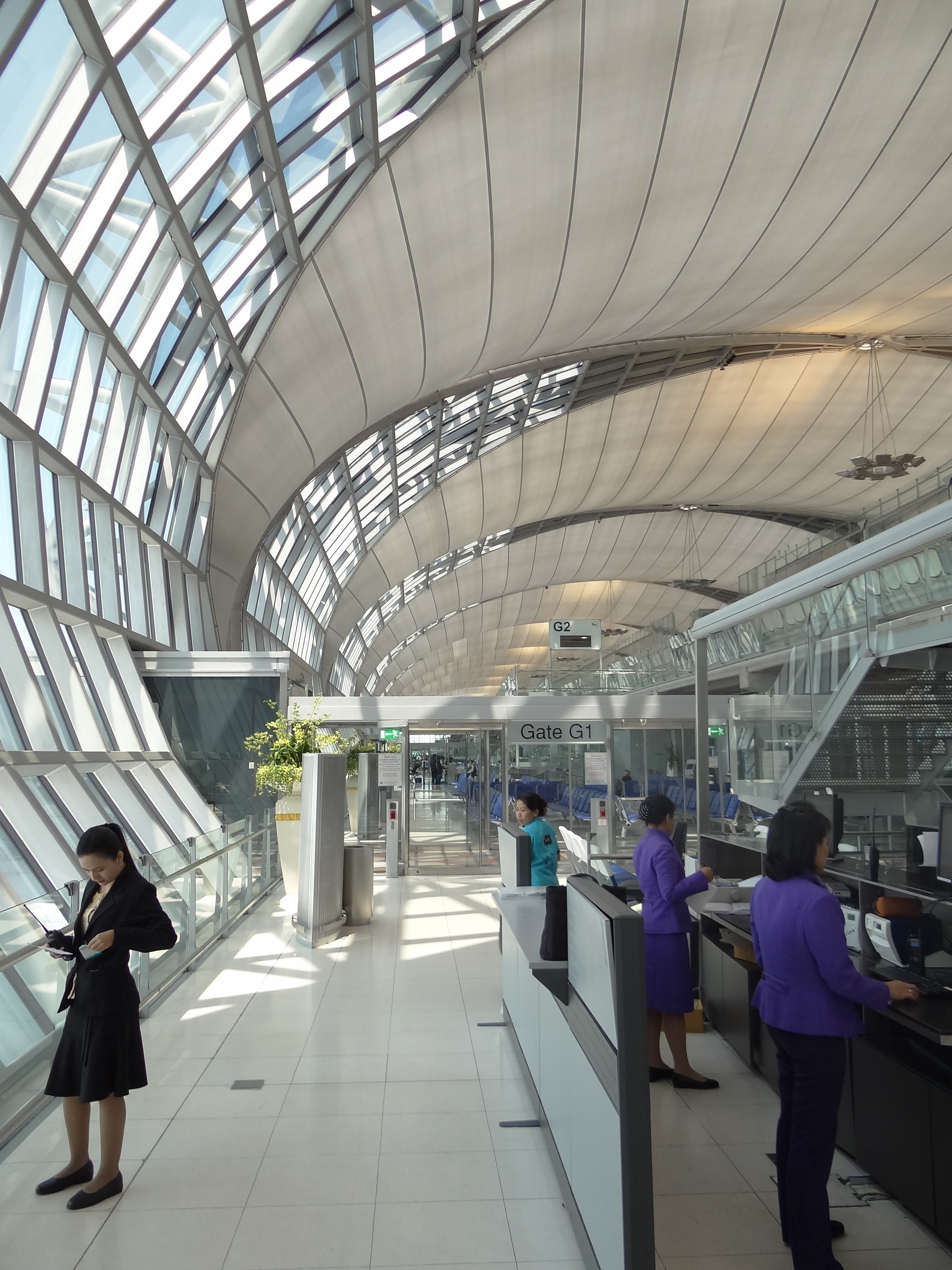
Suvarnabhumi Airport. Bangkok, Thailand

- 1999 K Street, Office, Washington DC, US
- 600 Fairbanks, Residential, Chicago, US
- Bayer, Headquarters, Leverkusen, Germany
- Deutsche Post, Headquarters, Bonn, Germany
- FKB, Airport, Cologne, Germany
- Focus Media Group, Mix-Use, Rostock, Germany
- Hegau Tower, Office, Singen, Germany
- Highlight Towers, Mix-Use, Munich, Germany
- Japan Post, Office, Tokyo, Japan
- Joe and Rika Mansueto Library, Chicago, US
- Leatop Plaza, Office, Guangzhou, PRC
- Merck, Headquarters, Geneva, Switzerland
- Shure, Headquarters, Chicago, US
- Sign, Headquarters, Düsseldorf, Germany
- Skyline Tower, Office, Munich, Germany
- State State Village, Residential, Chicago, US
- Suvarnabhumi, Airport, Bangkok, Thailand
- UIC, Power Plants, Chicago, US
- Yaesu Station, Tokyo, Japan

Selected completed projects from 2012 to 2014:

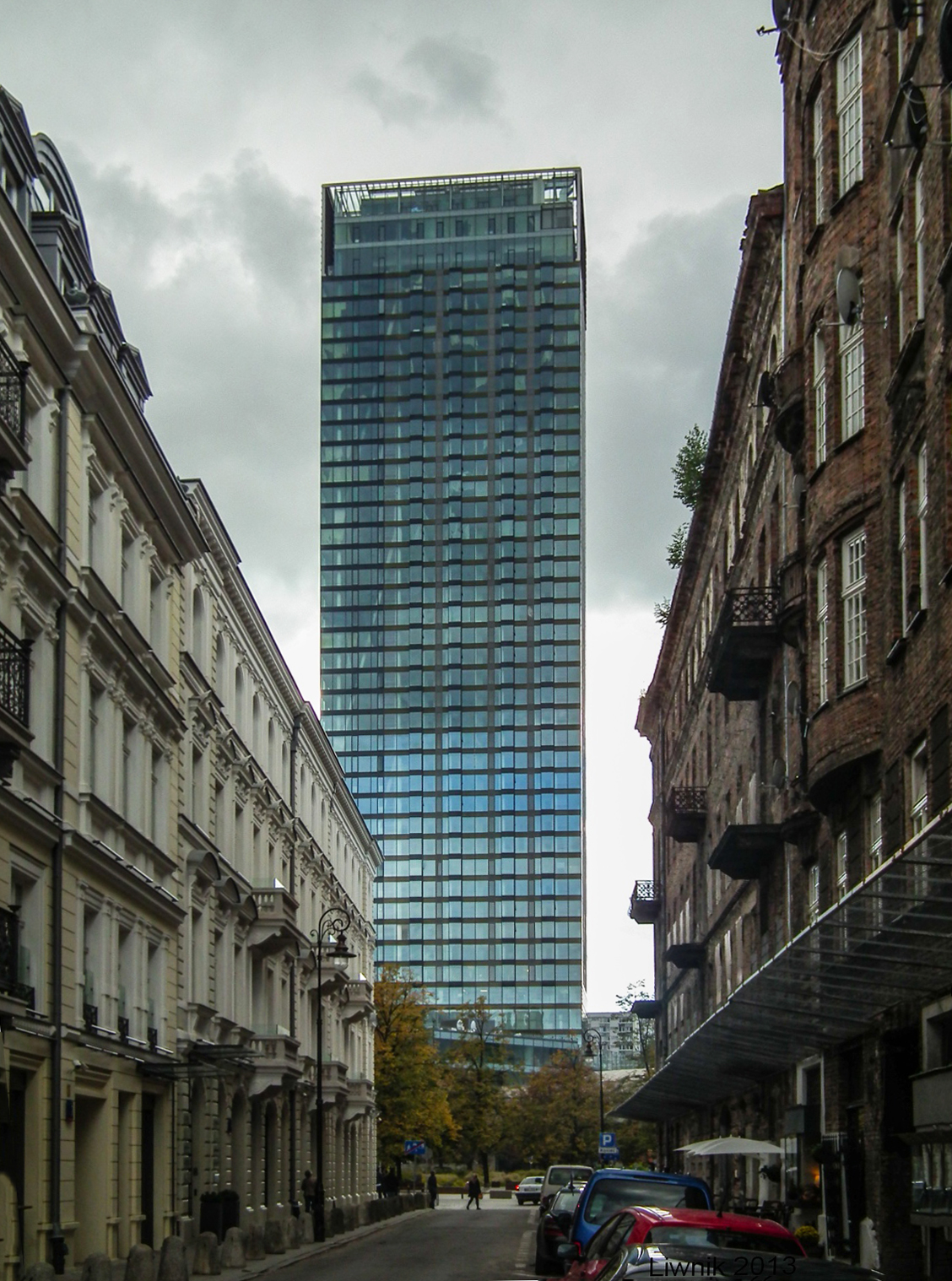
Cosmopolitan. Warsaw, Poland

- Cosmopolitan, Residential, Warsaw Poland
- Weser Tower, Office, Bremen, Germany

Projects under construction as main designer and partner in charge:

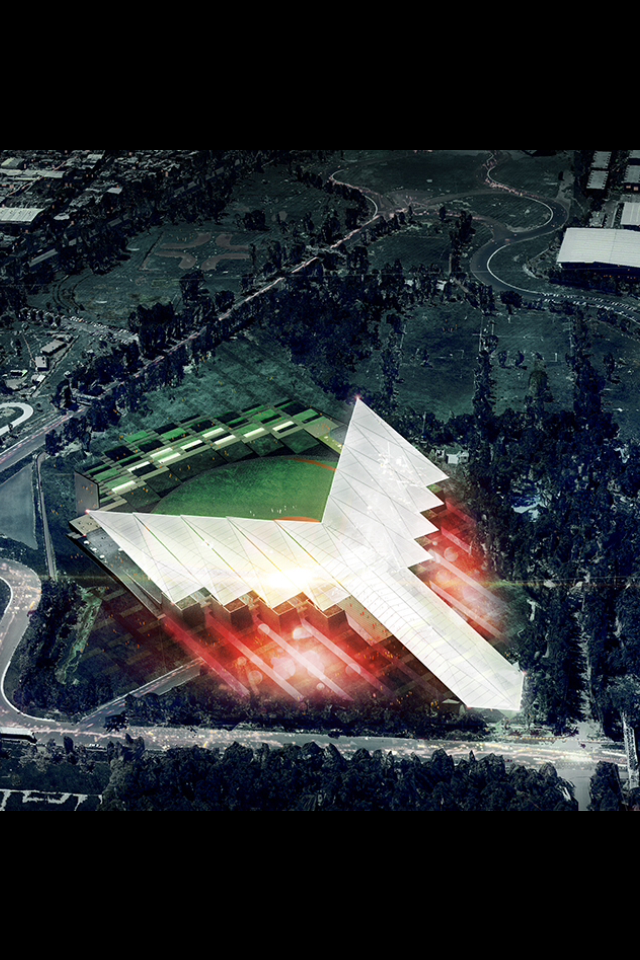
Diablos Rojos del México Ballpark, Mexico City. Mexico

- Doha Convention Center, Doha, Qatar
- Qiantan 14, Mix-Use, Shanghai, PRC
- SIFC, Headquarters, Shanghai, PRC
- Diablos Rojos del México, Ballpark, Mexico City, Mexico

== Publications ==
- The Bilbao Guggenheim Museum and other case studies in project's management for Harvard Graduate School of Design. (contributor)
- Helmut Jahn, Architecture-Engineering - Birkhauser.
- Helmut Jahn, Process and Progress - Birkhauser.
- Portfolio Design: Second and Third Edition - Norton.
- Murphy Jahn Six Works - Images Publishing.
- Bayer Headquarters - Birkhauser.
- Post Tower-Bonn - Birkhauser.
- State Street Village - Birkhauser.
- Visionary Chicago Architecture: Fourteen inspired concepts for the third millennia.

== Recognition ==
His work has been exhibited at the Art Institute of Chicago, the Unbuilt Chicago and the U2 Studio in Dublin. In 2005 he won the National Firm Award from the American Institute of Architects.
