= Veera =

Veera (Sanskrit and other Indian languages for "hero") may refer to:

== Films and media ==
- Veera (1994 film), a Tamil film directed by Suresh Krissna starring Rajnikanth
- Veera (2011 film), a Telugu film directed by A. Ramesh Varma starring Ravi Teja
- Veera (2013 film), a Kannada film directed by Ayyappa. P. Sharma starring Malashri
- Veera (2018 film), a Tamil film directed by Rajaraman
- Veeran (film), a 2023 Tamil film directed by ARK Saravan
- Veeramae Vaagai Soodum, a 2022 Indian Tamil film, Hindi title Veera: The Power
- Veera (Tamil TV series), a 2024 Indian TV series
- Ek Veer Ki Ardaas...Veera, an Indian TV series

== People ==
- Veera (actor), an Indian actor
- Veeran, an Indian actor
- Veerakarn or Veera Musikapong, a Thai politician
- Veera Ballala (disambiguation), South Indian kings of the Hoysala Empire
  - Veera Ballala I
  - Veera Ballala II
  - Veera Ballala III
- Finnish/Estonian spelling of the given name Vera (given name)
  - Veera Baranova, Estonian track and field athlete
  - Veera Kivirinta, Finnish swimmer
  - Veera Mattila, Finnish track and field athlete
  - Veera Rumjantseva, Estonian sport shooter
  - Veera Ruoho, Finnish politician and an Olympic Taekwondo practitioner

== See also ==
- Veer (disambiguation)
- Veeram (disambiguation)
- Veeranna (disambiguation)
- Virani (disambiguation)
- Veerana, a 1988 Indian horror film by Ramsay Brothers
- Veeran, a character in the 2024 Indian sci-fi film Kalki 2898 AD, portrayed by Pasupathy
