= Veer Towers =

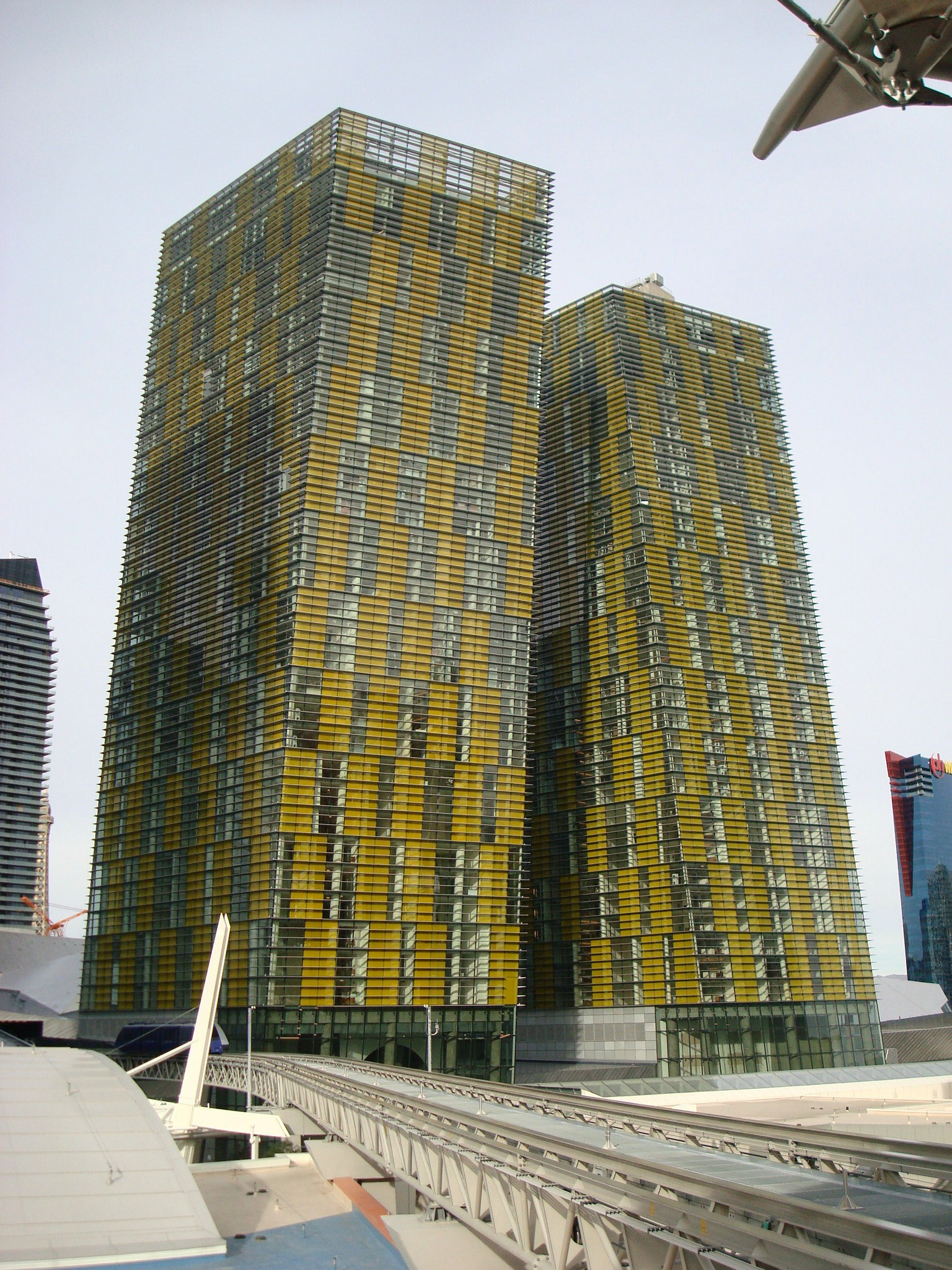
- Veer Towers in March 2010
- Interactive map of the Veer Towers area

General information
- Status: Completed
- Type: Condo towers
- Location: Las Vegas Strip, 3722 South Las Vegas Boulevard, Paradise, Nevada, United States
- Coordinates: 36°6′26.50″N 115°10′29″W
- Construction started: 2007
- Completed: 2010
- Opening: July 15, 2010; 15 years ago

Height
- Height: 480-foot (150 m)

Technical details
- Floor count: 37 stories

Design and construction
- Architects: Helmut Jahn and Francisco Gonzalez Pulido; AAI Architects, Inc. (as architect of record)
- Developer: MGM Mirage
- Main contractor: Perini Building Company

Other information
- Number of units: 670

Veer Towers are twin 37-story condominium towers within the CityCenter complex, located on the Las Vegas Strip in Paradise, Nevada. The inclined buildings were designed by Murphy/Jahn Architects and tilt in opposite directions at a five-degree angle. Veer Towers opened on July 15, 2010, and is the only all-residential property at CityCenter. The property includes 670 units, divided between the two towers.

== History and features ==
Veer Towers was announced in October 2006, as part of the CityCenter project by MGM Mirage. Perini Building Company served as the project's general contractor. The 37-story towers rise 480 ft (150 m), and tilt in opposite directions at a five-degree angle. Both towers use a parallelogram-shaped footprint. The leaning effect is created through use of vertical structural columns in a "tree branch" configuration, that shift load to each subsequent floor plate, as well as through post-tensioned beams.

Rebar errors were discovered in the towers during construction. By 2009, the issue had been remedied by wrapping fiberglass jackets around the columns. Veer Towers was originally meant to open with the rest of CityCenter in December 2009. Completion of the towers was delayed, however, opening instead on July 15, 2010.

Veer Towers was designed by Helmut Jahn and his design firm, Murphy/Jahn Architects, with AAI Architects, Inc. as architect of record. Lobbies and public spaces were designed by Francisco Gonzalez Pulido, an architect at Jahn's firm. The lobby design includes metal and exposed concrete walls. The lobby walls of both towers feature mud drawings, titled Circle of Chance and Earth, by artist Richard Long. He diluted mud that he brought to Las Vegas from the River Avon in England, and applied it to the walls with his hands. The corners of each tower are lit in subtle neon by an LED system, programmed by lighting designer Yann Kersalé.

Because of its environmentally friendly design, Veer Towers received a LEED Gold certification on November 20, 2009. The tower design includes yellow paneling on the glass exterior to reflect sunlight and reduce energy costs.

Veer Towers is the only component of CityCenter that is dedicated solely to residential space. It has a total of 670 units, with 335 in each tower. Units range from 500 to 3,300 square feet (46 to 307 m^{2}). Upon opening, condominium owners had the option of renting out their units.

Ladder Capital, a New York investment firm, purchased more than 60 percent of unsold units in a bulk sale at the end of 2012. The $119 million deal covered 427 condos, leaving only 11 units available, all of them penthouses. Ladder began marketing its units in 2013.

== Gallery ==
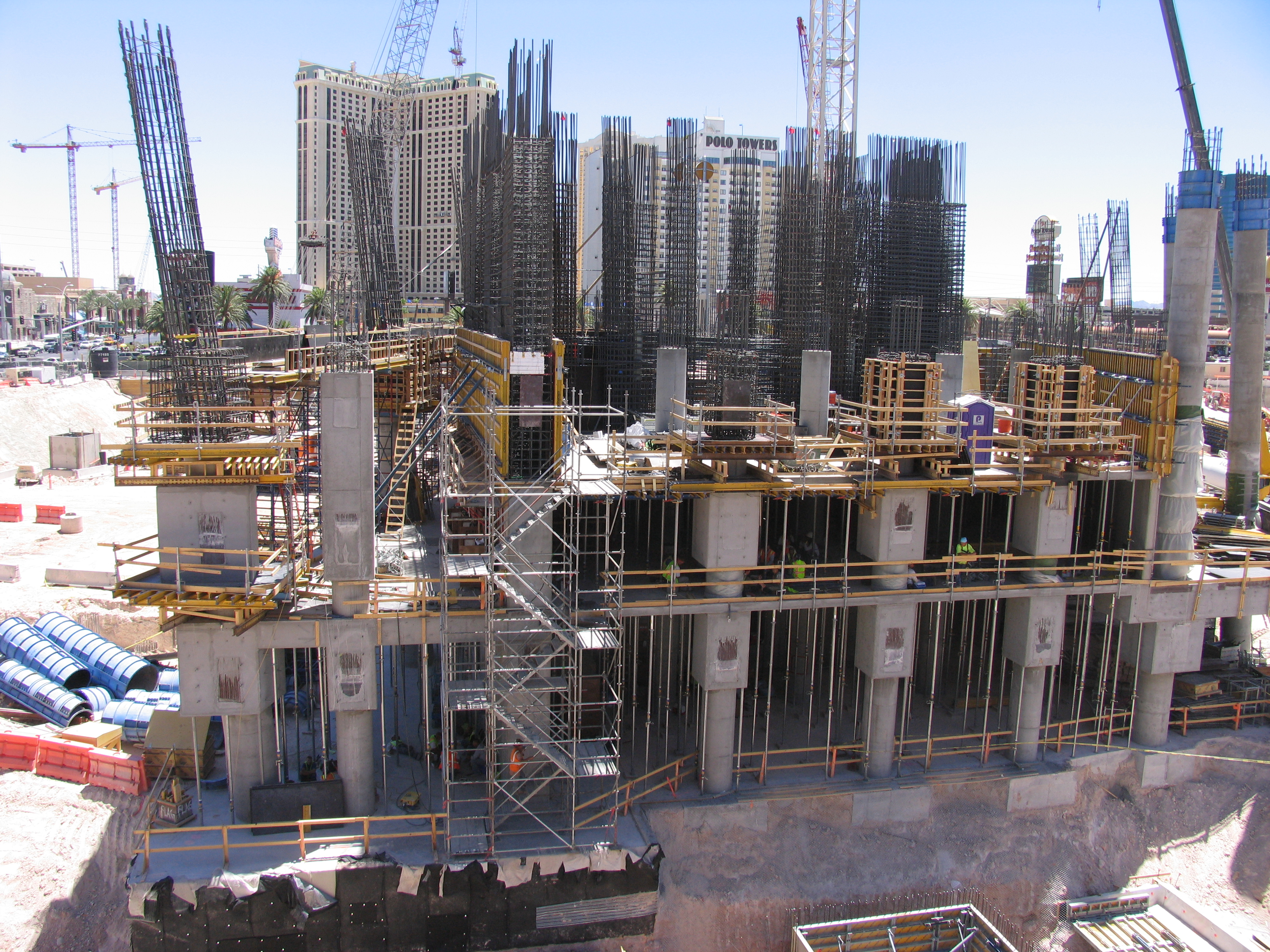
Construction of the first few floors, July 2007

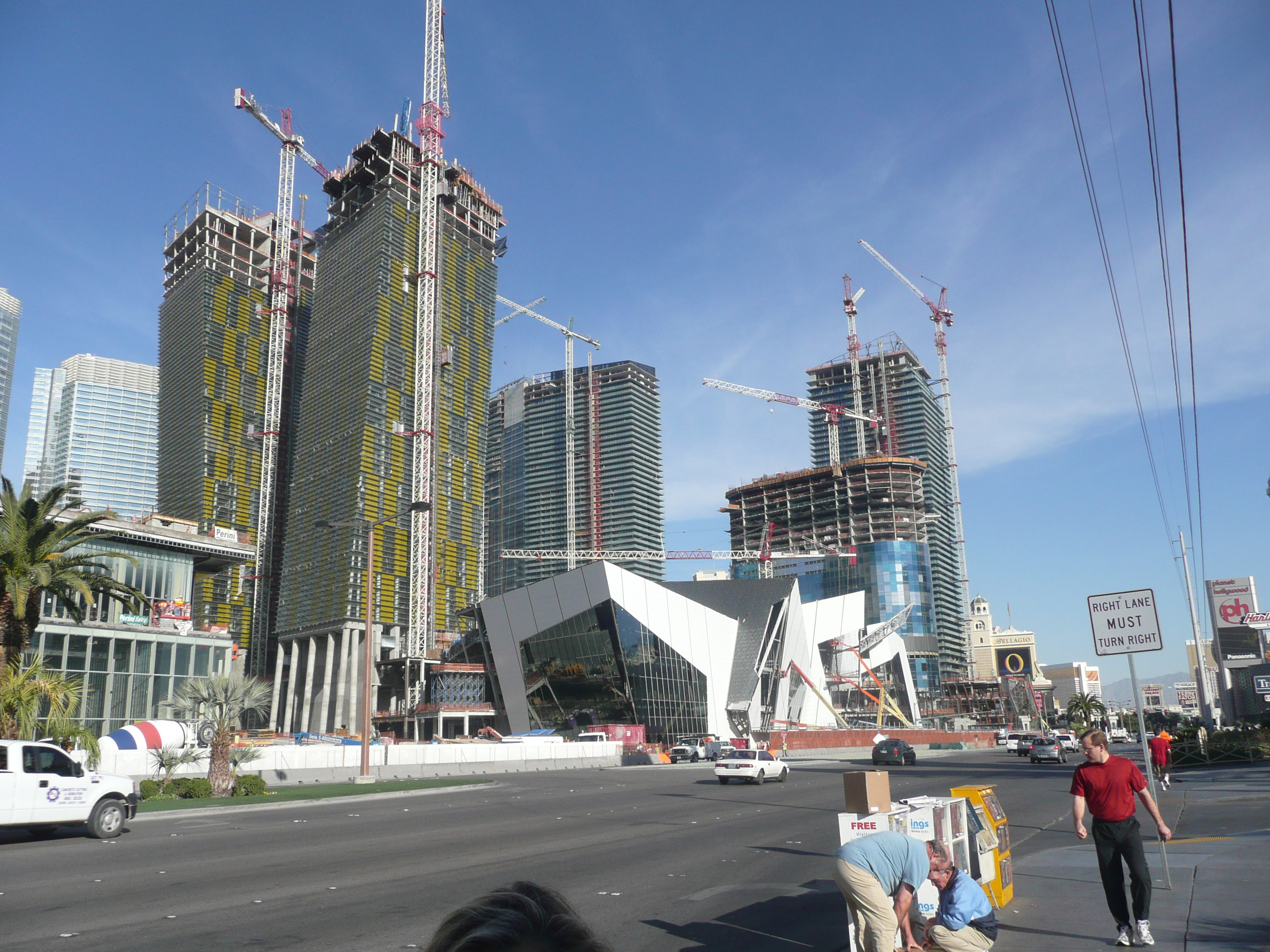
Construction of the facade and final floors, February 2009

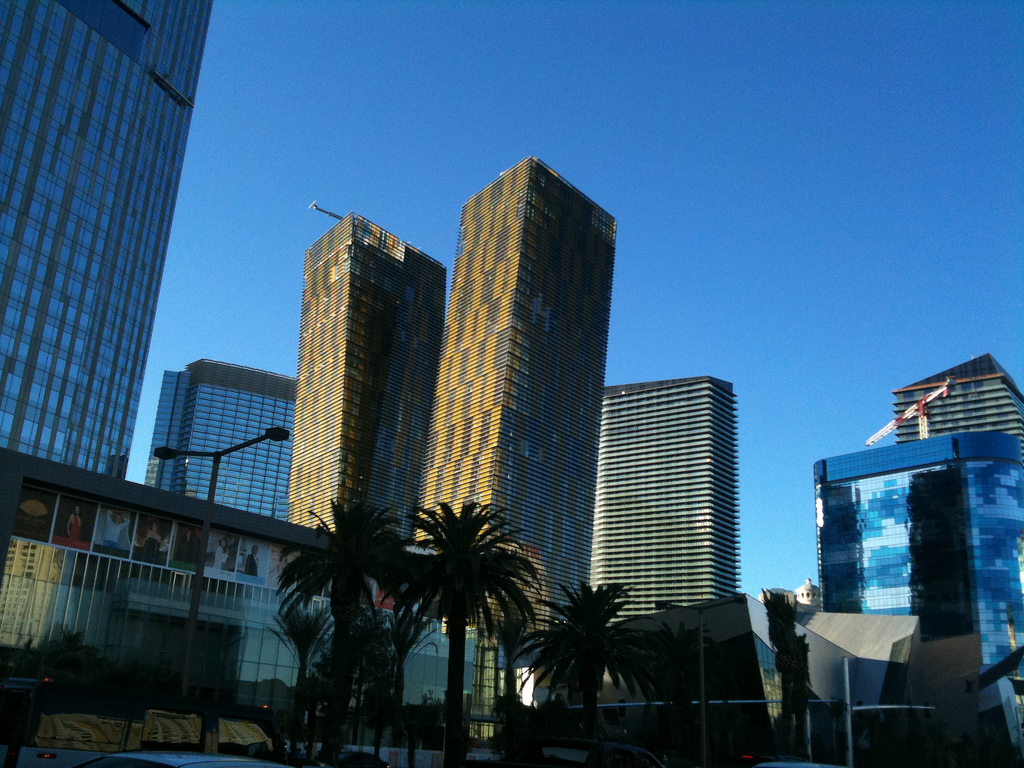
Veer Towers in November 2009, a month before CityCenter's opening

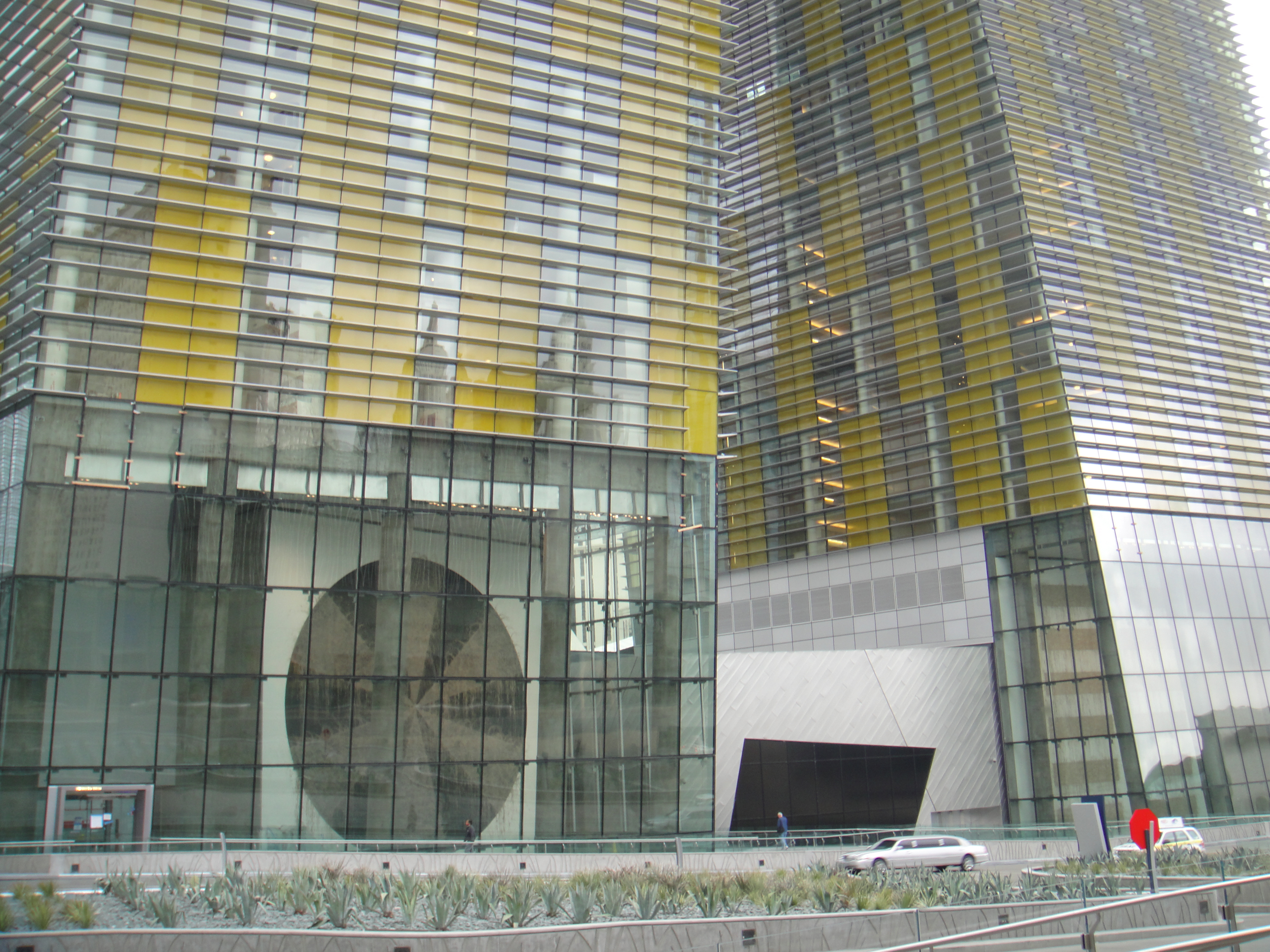
The west tower lobby in March 2010

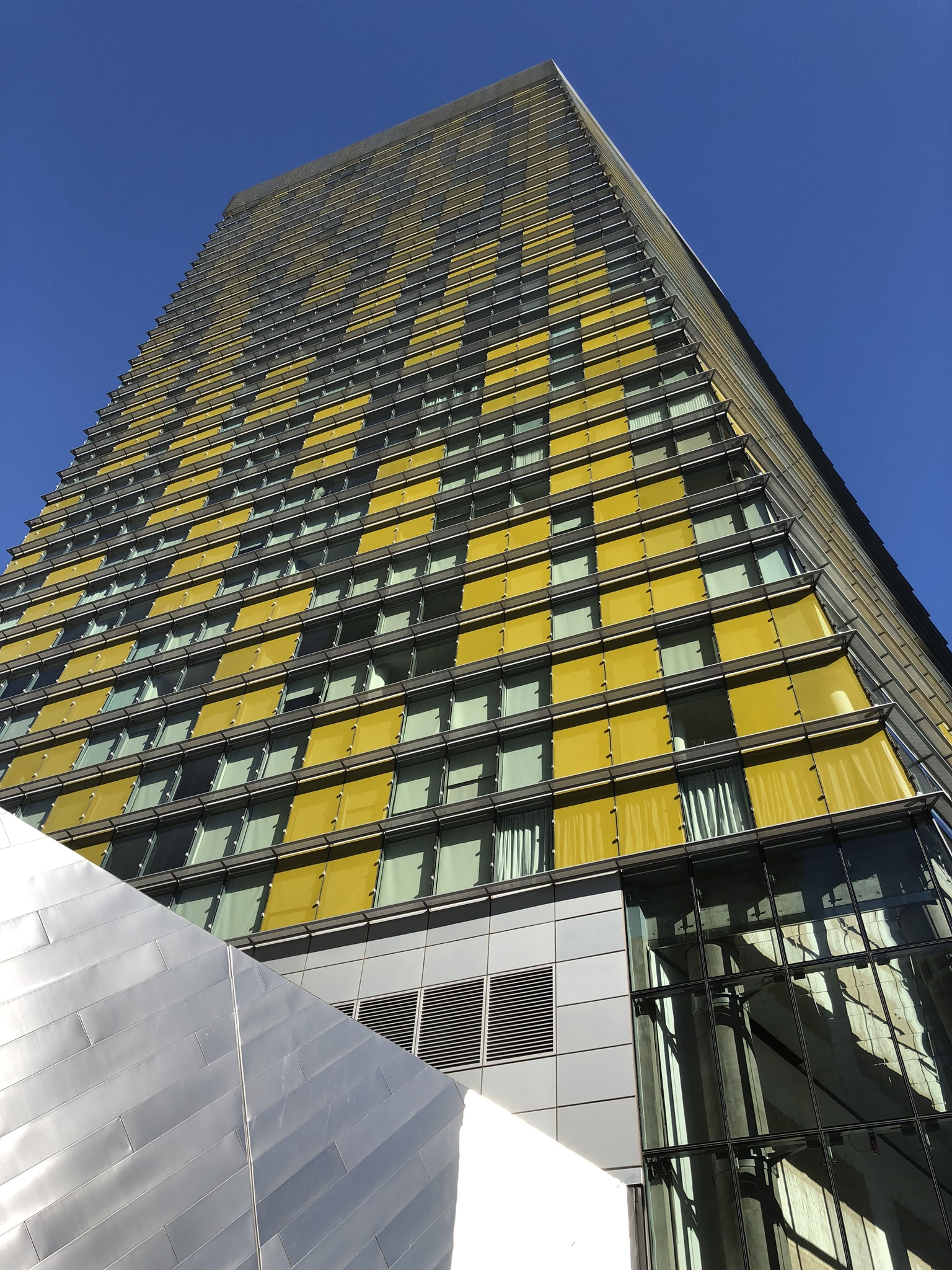
Closer look at the tower design

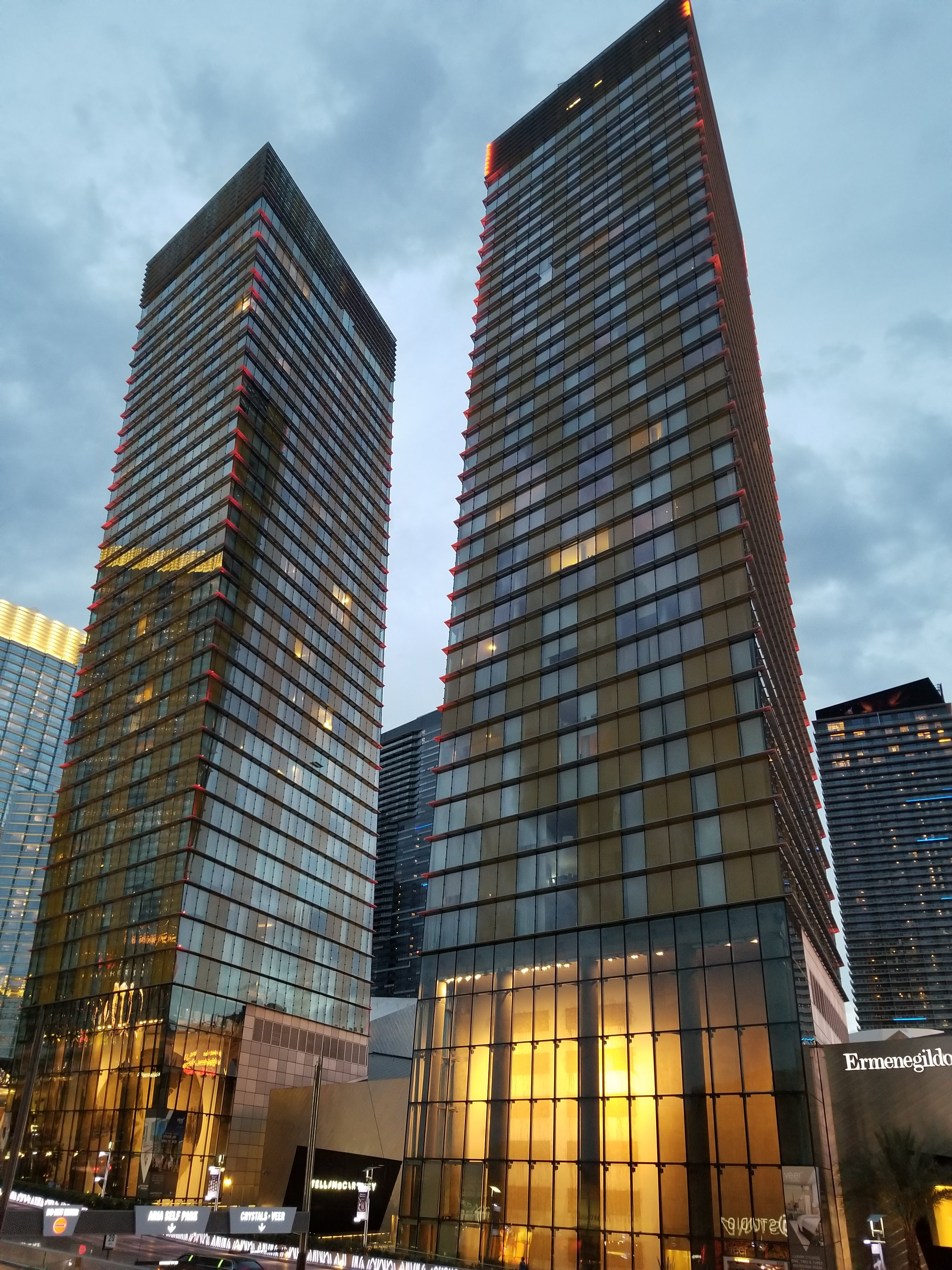
South side of the towers

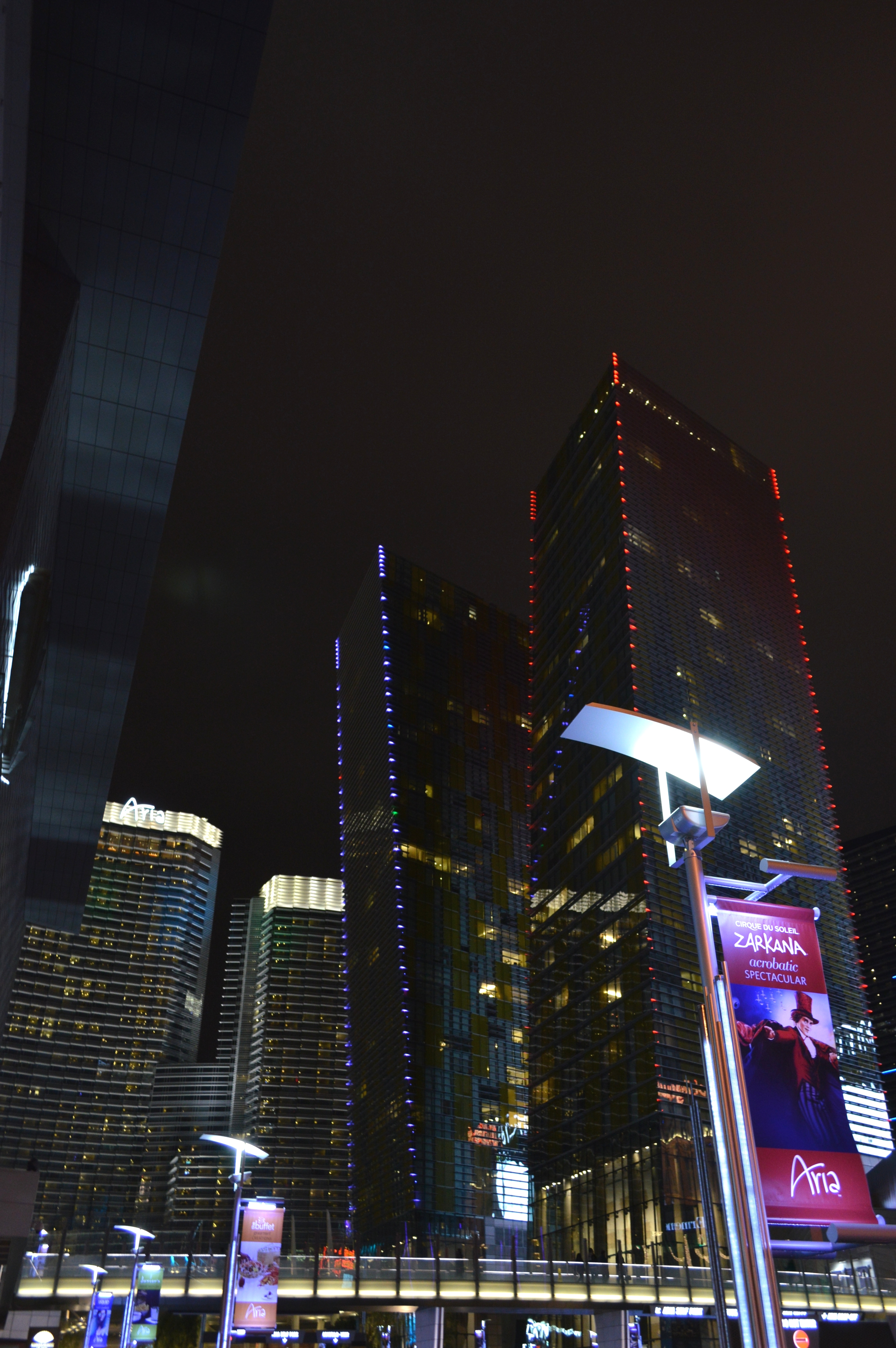
Veer Towers at night

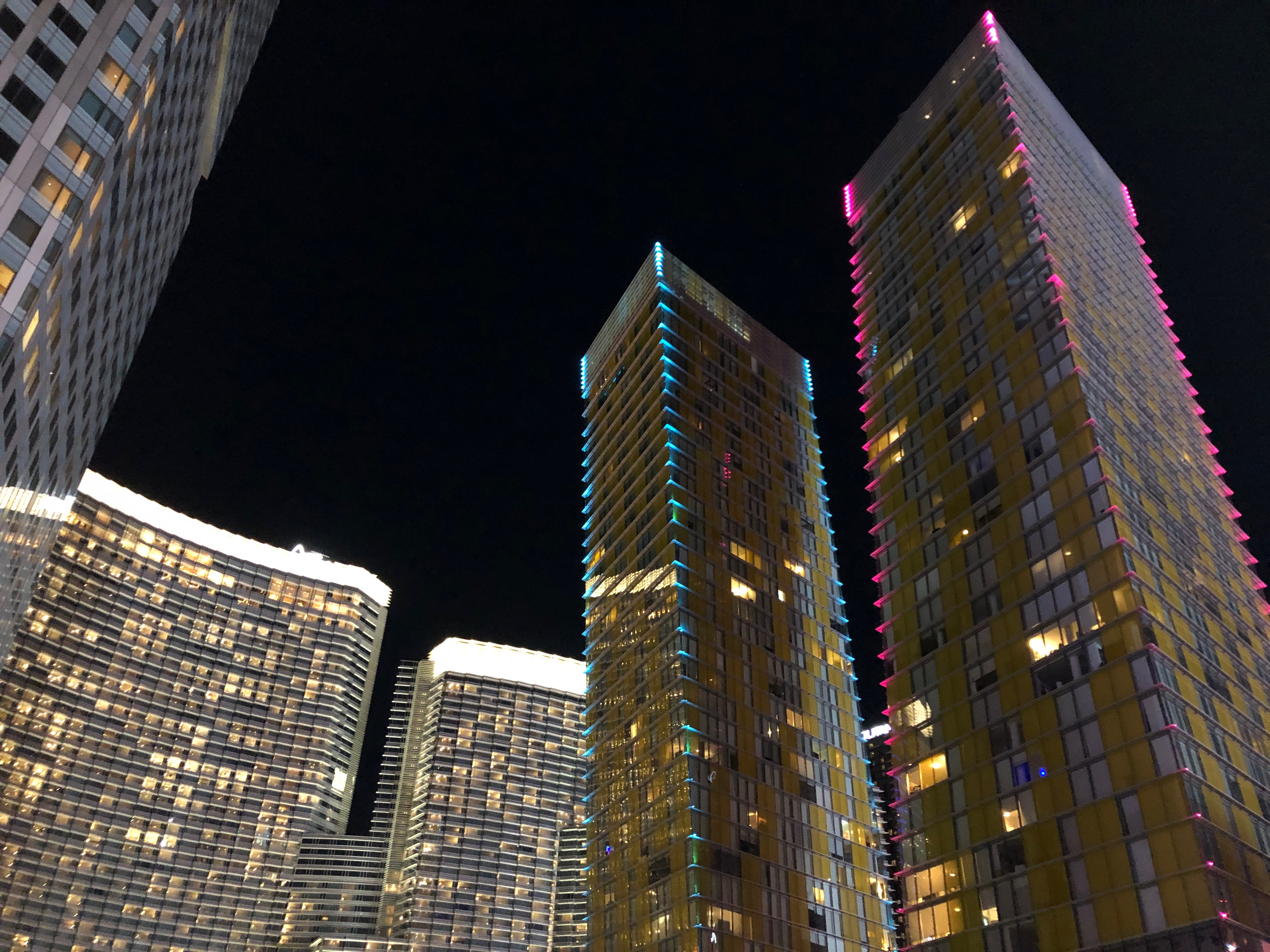
Neon corner lighting

== See also ==
- List of tallest buildings in Las Vegas
