= Virani (surname) =

Virani is a surname. Notable people with the surname include:

- Aquil Virani, Canadian artist
- Arif Virani (born 1971), Canadian lawyer and politician
- Barkat Virani (1923–1994), Gujarati author and poet
- Kaul Virani, Indian politician
- Pinki Virani (born 1959), Indian writer, journalist, and human rights activist
- Shafique Virani, Canadian scholar
- Dr. Tazim Virani, Canadian healthcare executive

== See also ==
- Virani Noordin, Ugandan cricketer
