= Veeram =

Veeram may refer to:

- Veeram (2014 film), an Indian Tamil action film
- Veeram (2016 film), an Indian historical epic, released in Malayalam, Hindi, and English
- Veeram (2023 film), an Indian Kannada-language action drama film

== See also ==
- Veer (disambiguation)
- Veera (disambiguation)
