= Bandlamudi Subba Rao =

Indian agronomist

Dr. Bandlamudi Subba Rao, President, Prof. N.G. Ranga Foundation, hails from Veerannapalem village in Parchuru Mandal of Prakasam District of Andhra Pradesh, India. Born on 22 May 1954, he obtained Doctorate in Agricultural Economics from Banaras Hindu University. He is a member of Congress Party and is an agricultural economist, columnist, writer, political and social activist, historian and farmers' leader.

He is Founder-President of Indian Young Kisan Mazdoor Congress, which was inaugurated by late Mr.Rajiv Gandhi on 2 February 1982 at Guntur, Andhra Pradesh. He is active member of Congress Party for the last thirty years, working for the welfare of farmers since then. He is Founder-President of Prof.N.G.Ranga Foundation which was formed to perpetuate the memory of late Prof.N.G.Ranga, veteran Parliamentarian. He organised many meetings, seminars, symposia and group discussions on contemporary issues and continue to do so.

He was member of the Indian Oil Seeds Development Council during 1983–85, Member of Governing Council of National Institute of Agricultural Extension Management during 1991–94 and Trustee, Paradip Port Trust during 1994–96.

He attended the Silver Jubilee Conference of International Federation of Agricultural Producers held at London in 1982 as Indian Delegate, attended the 2007 World Congress of World Agricultural Forum held at St.Luis, USA as Indian Delegate from 8–10 May 2007 and attended the TANA Conference at Washington D.C. from 4–6 July as invited dignitary.

He traveled to Canada, France, Italy, Netherlands, Singapore, Switzerland, USA and UK. He published 25 research papers in leading scientific journals of agriculture. He published the historical novel "Sri Krishna Deva" in Telugu which ran to three editions. He also published a book Booju Pattina Rajyangam in Telugu.
