= Leatop Plaza =

Skyscraper in Guangzhou, Guangdong, China

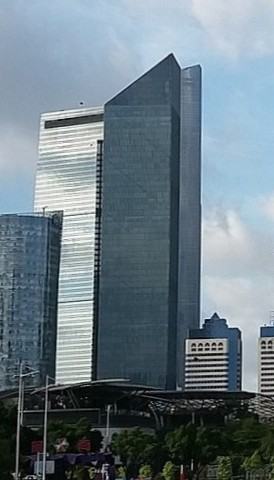
- Leatop Plaza in May 2021
- Interactive map of the Leatop Plaza area

General information
- Status: Completed
- Type: Commercial offices
- Architectural style: Modernism
- Location: Zhujiang East Road; Guangzhou, Guangdong, China
- Coordinates: 23.12833°N 113.32028°E
- Construction started: October 8, 2008
- Completed: July 3, 2012
- Owner: Guangdong Leatop Real Estate Investment Co., Ltd

Height
- Antenna spire: 302.7 m (993 ft)
- Roof: 264.6 m (868 ft)

Technical details
- Floor count: 66; 5 below ground
- Floor area: 118,988 m^{2} (1,280,780 sq ft)
- Lifts/elevators: 35

Design and construction
- Architect: Francisco Gonzalez-Pulido for JAHN
- Developer: Guangdong Leatop Real Estate Investment Co., Ltd
- Engineer: Magnusson Klemencic Associates
- Main contractor: China Construction 8th Engineering Division

Leatop Plaza (Chinese: 利通广场; Chinese: 利通廣場) is a 66-storey, 302.7 m (993 ft) late-modernist supertall skyscraper in Guangzhou, China. Leatop Plaza is placed on the site parallel to the East entrance at the central axis of Zhujiang New Town. The office tower has a floor pitch of 4 m (13 ft). The construction of the glass and steel-building was completed in July 2012. Design by Francisco Gonzalez-Pulido for JAHN.

== See also ==
- List of tallest buildings in Guangzhou
- List of tallest buildings in the world
