= Vira =

Vira may refer to:

== Places ==
- Vira, Ariège, a commune in the Ariège department, France
- Vira (Gambarogno), a municipality in the canton of Ticino, Switzerland
- Vira, Kutch, a village in Kutch district of Gujarat, India
- Vira, Pyrénées-Orientales, a commune in the Pyrénées-Orientales department, France
- Vira, Split-Dalmatia County, a village on Hvar Island, Croatia

== Other uses ==
- Vira, plural of "virus" in some pluralizations
  - Phylum vira, part of the LHT Virus classification scheme
- Vira people of Central Africa
- Vira (dance), a traditional dance from Portugal
- Vira (card game), a Swedish three-handed plain trick game using an ordinary 52-card pack. Sometimes spelled Wira.
- VirA protein, a protein histidine kinase
- Vira (given name), Ukrainian female first name
- LG V20

== See also ==
- Virani (disambiguation)
