= VeeR VR =

Chinese technology company

- Type: Private
- Industry: Virtual Reality
- Founded: June 2016
- Headquarters: San Francisco, USA
- Website: veer.tv

Velocious Technologies (known as VeeR VR) is the global VR content community founded in 2016. The three co-founders have been featured by Forbes 30 under 30 Asia 2018 as honourees for the consumer technology sector, become the only founders of virtual reality technology company to make the list this year.

== Products ==
As of March 2018, Veer VR offered 2 apps for Android and iOS: VeeR VR for making 360 degrees and VR videos & photos and VeeR Editor for editing them.
