= Kaul Virani =

Indian politician

MLA of Gujarat
- In office 2007–2012
- Constituency: Savarkundla

Personal details
- Party: Bhartiya Janata Party

Kaul Virani was a Member of Legislative assembly from Savarkundla constituency in Gujarat for its 12th legislative assembly.
