= Veerannapalem =

- Village
- Interactive map of Veerannapalem
- Location in Andhra Pradesh, India Veerannapalem (India)
- Coordinates: 15°57′30″N 80°19′15″E
- Country: India
- State: Andhra Pradesh
- District: Bapatla

Languages
  - Official: Telugu
- Time zone: UTC+5:30 (IST)
- PIN: 523 169

Veerannapalem is a small village and a panchyat located in the Parchur mandal of the Bapatla district, in the state of Andhra Pradesh, India. It is used to be a village in the Guntur district, but in 1970 became part of the Prakasam district before finally becoming part of Bapatla district. The village is situated 23 kilometres (14 miles) from Chirala.

== Political View ==
The village comes under the Assembly Constituency of Parchur and the Parliament(Loksabha) segment of Bapatla

== Geography ==
Veerannapalem is located at 15°57′30″ N, 80°19′15″ E. It has an average elevation of 9 metres (30 feet).

== History ==
In the approximate period of 1600–1700 AD, a man named Veeranna started living at an unnamed place near his fields; the place became a village named after him.

There are two large ponds in the village, the main source of drinking water; In 2008 a drinking water plant began providing clean drinking water in addition to the water plant served earlier. The main occupation in the village is agriculture.

== Notable people ==
- Bandlamudi Subba Rao (born 1954), agricultural economist, columnist, writer, political and social activist, historian and farmers' leader
