= Viran =

Viran is a given name and may refer to:

- Viran Molisa Trief (born 1977), Ni-Vanuata jurist
- Viran Morros (born 1983), Spanish handball player
- Viran Rydkvist (1879–1942), Swedish actress and theatre director

== See also ==
- Viran Qayah, village in East Azerbaijan, Iran
