= Architect of record =

Architect who appears on building permit

Architect of record is the architect or architecture firm whose name appears on a building permit issued for a specific project on which that architect or firm performed services.

== Issuance of building permits ==
Building permits are issued by a government agency with the authority in a certain jurisdiction to regulate building construction and enforce building codes. Generally, the building contractor submits the application for the permit to the regulatory authority, along with a building project's drawings and specifications (called collectively "construction documents"). But in some jurisdictions, the architect is required to submit the construction documents needed to obtain the building permit. With some construction projects, more than one building permit is issued. That occurs when several different architects perform services on discrete parts of a single building project. More than one architect of record, therefore, would exist in such a case.

== Project specifics ==
When an architecture firm is working on a project that is outside their geographic location or range of expertise, it will often choose to work with an architect that is either local to the project site or skilled in that particular area of expertise. In this case, the primary architect works with the local architect in order to complete the project, and the local architect becomes the "architect of record." This type of working relationship is common when high-profile architects (or "starchitects") win design bids but find themselves in need of architects with more practical skills or knowledge of local conditions. Or more pragmatically, the high-profile architect simply needs an architect who is local to the project site, facilitating quicker site visits and project oversight.

The local architecture firms that are responsible for corresponding with city agencies about code compliance, tender documents, client communication and creating up to 90 percent of the construction documents and carry out construction inspections are similar, but should be referred to as the "executive architect."
