= Turnberry Ocean Club Residences =

Residential tower in Florida

Coordinates: 25°56′52″N 80°7′12″W

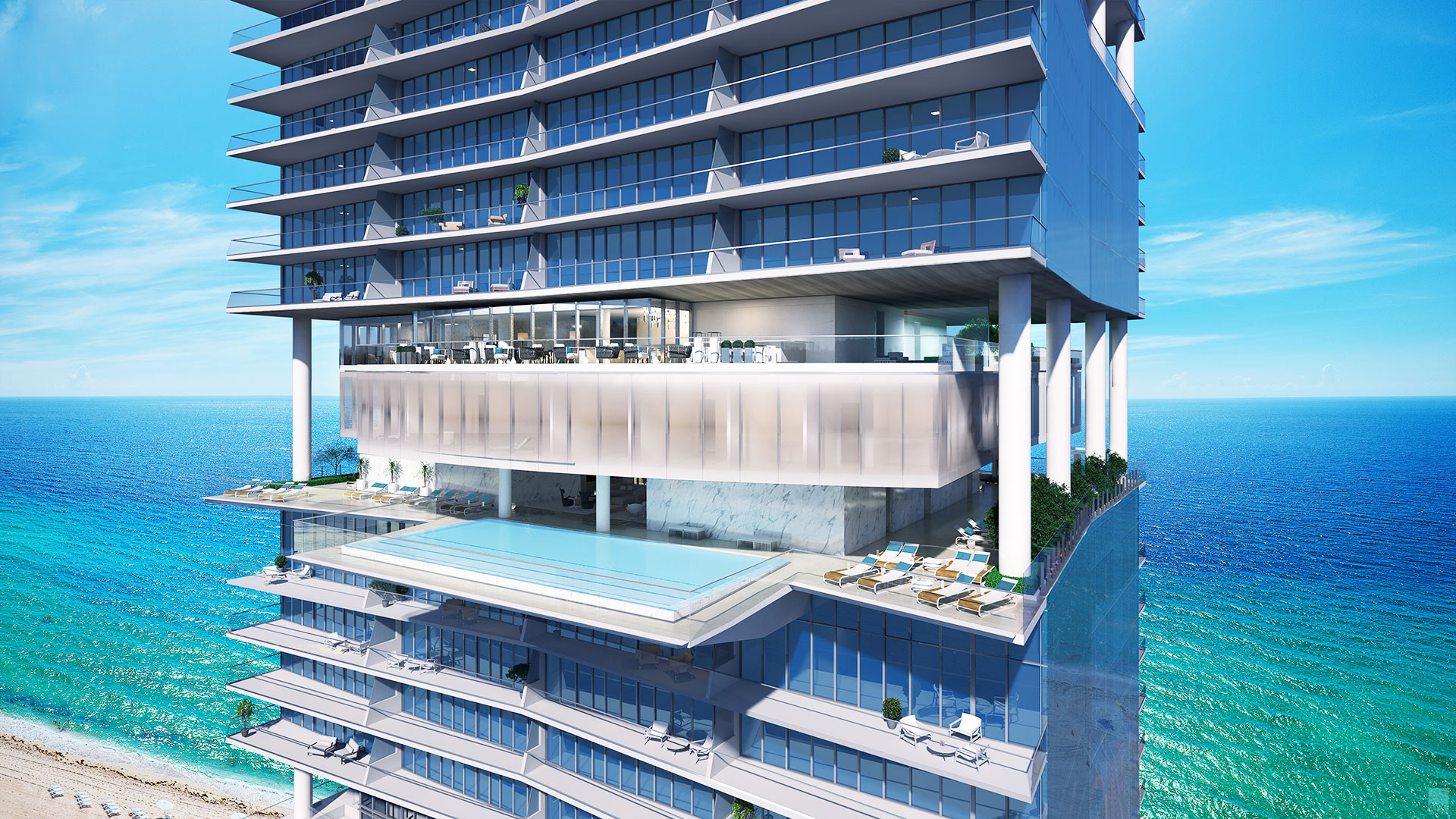
Rendering of the Turnberry Ocean Club Residences

Turnberry Ocean Club Residences is a residential tower in Sunny Isles Beach, Florida. The building broke ground in fall of 2016 and was completed in 2020. It is 649 feet tall with 52 stories and has 154 three to six bedroom residences.

== Description ==
The project is designed by architects Carlos Zapata and Robert Swedroe Architecture, and developed by Turnberry Associates. Carlos Zapata is a Venezuelan-born architect, known for his work on Soldier Field in Chicago. Robert Swedroe worked for 12 years as a senior design architect for Morris Lapidus, the architect behind Miami's Fontainebleau Hotel.

Turnberry Associates is a development and property management company based in Aventura, Florida, started by real estate developer Donald Soffer. The company's residential, hospitality, retail and commercial projects are valued at more than $8 billion. Other projects include Aventura Mall, Fontainebleau Hotel, Turnberry Isle Miami Resort and Country Club, and The Signature at MGM Grand.

== Ground breaking ==
The ground breaking commenced on November 15, 2016. The event gathered Turnberry key players including developer Jeffrey Soffer, who spoke about the development's vision and its future.
