= Fontainebleau Development =

American resort-hotel company

- Type: Private
- Industry: Real estate development
- Founded: November 6, 2018; 7 years ago in Aventura, Florida, United States
- Founder: Jeffrey Soffer, Glenn Schaeffer
- Headquarters: Aventura, Florida, United States
- Key people: Jeffrey Soffer (chairman and CEO); Brett Mufson (president)
- Owner: Fontainebleau Development, Jeffrey Soffer, Brett Mufson
- Website: fontainebleau.com

Fontainebleau Development is an American real estate development and investment company headquartered in Aventura, Florida, founded by Jeffrey Soffer following the 2019 division of the Soffer family's interests in Turnberry Associates. The company develops, owns, and operates properties in the hospitality, gaming, residential, commercial, aviation, and marina sectors.

A predecessor company was started in Florida by South Florida real estate developers Turnberry Associates, after their purchase of the Fontainebleau Hotel in Miami Beach. The company is based in Aventura, Florida.

== History ==
Fontainebleau Development was established in March 2019, when Jeffrey Soffer split from Turnberry Associates, the South Florida real estate firm founded by his father, Donald Soffer in 1967. Jeffrey partnered with Brett Mufson, who led the company as president. Jeffrey and his sister, Jackie Soffer had co-led Turnberry for approximately 25 years when they agreed to divide the company's assets. Jeffrey Soffer took ownership of Fontainebleau Miami Beach, JW Marriott Turnberry Resort & Spa in Aventura, and Turnberry Ocean Club Residences, while Jackie Soffer remained at Turnberry with its core holdings, including Aventura Mall. The two siblings continued to share ownership of certain assets, including Hilton Nashville Downtown and Fontainebleau Aviation.

On April 17, 2007, Publishing & Broadcasting Limited announced that it had entered into an agreement to acquire 19% of Fontainebleau Resorts for $250 million.

Schaeffer left Fontainebleau Resorts without explanation in May 2009. Schaeffer was primarily responsible for securing more than $3 billion in loans for the Fontainebleau Resort Las Vegas project.

The unfinished Fontainebleau Las Vegas resort filed for Chapter 11 bankruptcy in June 2009. The property was acquired and sold several times, until February 2021 when Fontainebleau Development reacquired the property in partnership with Koch Real Estate Investments. The resort opened on December 13, 2023.

The 37-floor Trésor Tower at Fontainebleau Miami Beach was the first project undertaken entirely by Fontainebleau Development's in-house design team. The full renovation was completed in early 2023.

In June 2024, Fontainebleau Development was granted approval to purchase five acres of land near its Las Vegas resort for $112.5 million.

In December 2024, the company secured $1.75 billion from Goldman Sachs and J.P. Morgan, arranged by Newmark Group, to refinance the Fontainebleau Miami Beach and the JW Marriott Miami Turnberry Resort & Spa.

In 2023, Fontainebleau Development built SeaGlass Jupiter Island, a 10-story, 21-unit condominium. In 2025, it partnered with Starwood Capital Group on a second oceanfront project named 1 Homes Jupiter Island, which includes 10 stories and 26 units.

The Fontainebleau Miami Beach resorts new Coastal Convention Center was opened December 11, 2024.

In early 2025, Fontainebleau Las Vegas finalized a labor agreement with the Culinary Workers Union Local 226 and Bartenders Union Local 165, ensuring job security and standardized wages for 3,300 employees.

== Properties ==
Fontainebleau Development's holdings span the hospitality, residential, aviation, and marina sectors.

Property	Location	Type	Notes
Fontainebleau Miami Beach	Miami Beach, Florida	Hotel and resort	Oceanfront flagship
Fontainebleau Las Vegas	Las Vegas, Nevada	Resort and casino	Opened December 2023
JW Marriott Miami Turnberry Resort & Spa	Aventura, Florida	Resort and spa	
Turnberry Ocean Club Residences	Sunny Isles Beach, Florida	Residential	
Hilton Nashville Downtown	Nashville, Tennessee	Hotel	Jointly held with Turnberry Associates
SeaGlass Jupiter Island	Tequesta, Florida	Residential	Completed 2023; developed with Perko Development Partners
1 Homes Jupiter Island	Tequesta, Florida	Residential	Announced 2025; developed with Starwood Capital Group
Fontainebleau Aviation	Opa-locka, Florida	Aviation services	Jointly held with Turnberry Associates
Turnberry Yacht Club & Marina	Aventura, Florida	Marina	

== Subsidiary companies ==
- Fontainebleau Las Vegas LLC
  - Fontainebleau Las Vegas Holdings LLC
  - Fontainebleau Las Vegas Capital Corp.
