= Indian Creek, Florida =

Village in Florida, US

- Village
- Village of Indian Creek
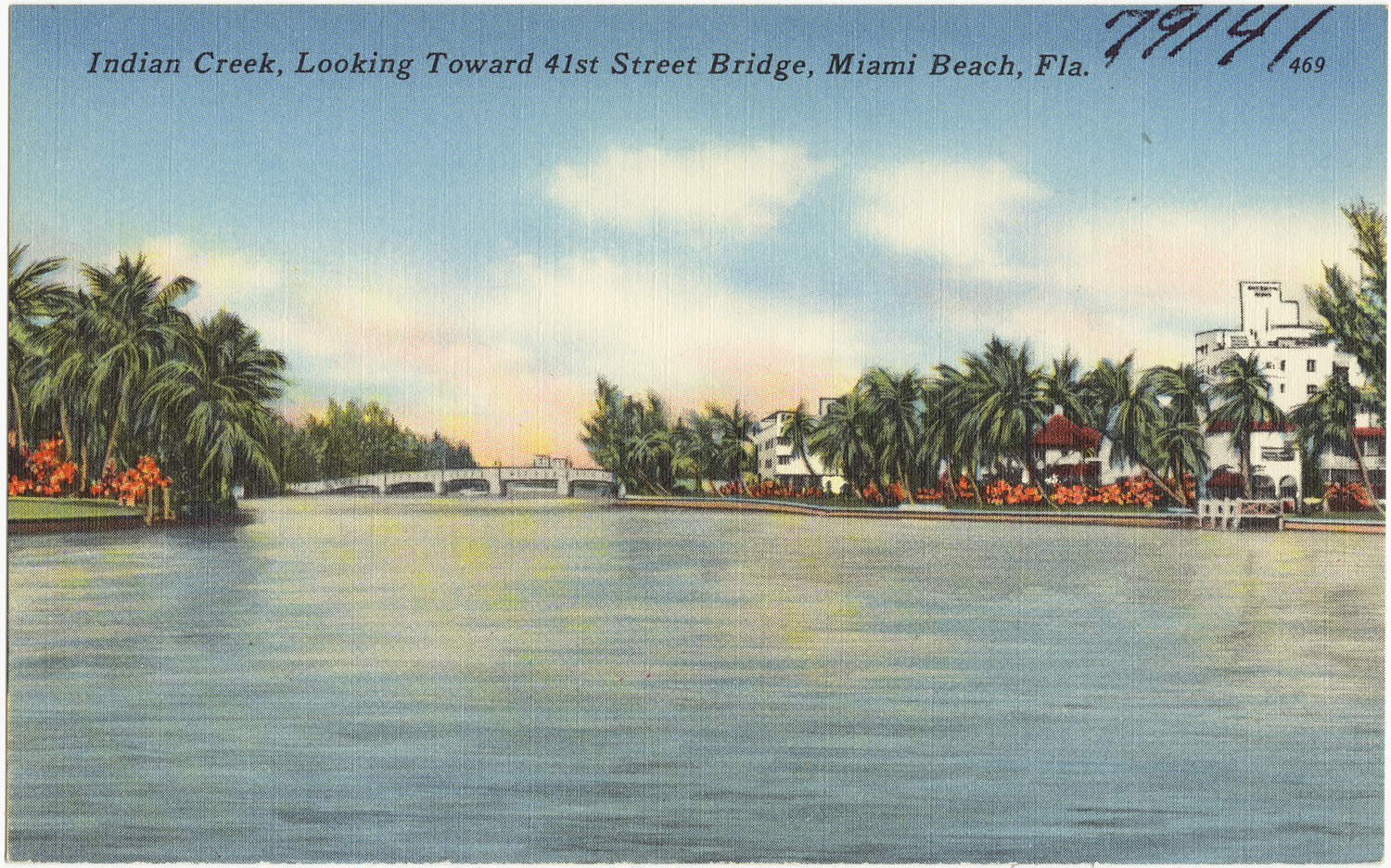
- 1930s postcard of Indian Creek, looking toward 41st Street Bridge

- Seal
- Nickname: Billionaire Bunker
- Motto: "Protect. Serve."
- Location in Miami-Dade County and the state of Florida

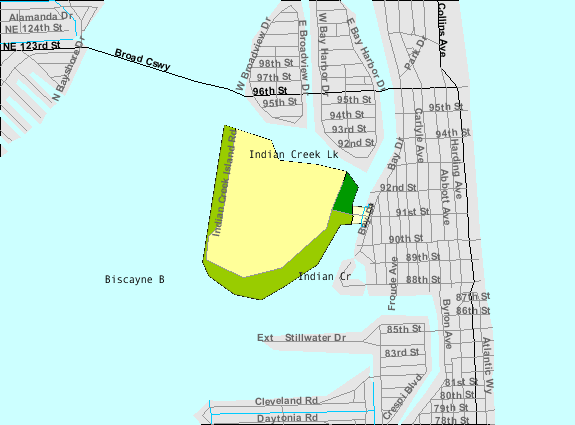
- U.S. Census Bureau map showing village boundaries
- Coordinates: 25°52′34″N 80°08′15″W
- Country: United States
- State: Florida
- County: Miami-Dade
- Founded: 1928
- Incorporated: May 17, 1939

Government
  - Type: Council–manager
  - Mayor: Bernard Klepach
  - Vice mayor: Irwin E. Tauber
  - Council members: Robert Diener, Irma Braman, and Jared Kushner
  - Village manager: Guillermo Olmedillo
  - Village clerk: Roseann Prado

Area
  - Total: 0.47 sq mi (1.21 km^{2})
  - Land: 0.43 sq mi (1.11 km^{2})
  - Water: 0.039 sq mi (0.10 km^{2})
- Elevation: 10 ft (3.0 m)

Population (2020)
  - Total: 84
  - Density: 196.3/sq mi (75.78/km^{2})
- Time zone: UTC-05:00 (Eastern (EST))
  - Summer (DST): UTC-04:00 (EDT)
- ZIP Code: 33154
- Area codes: 305, 786, 645
- FIPS code: 12-33425
- GNIS feature ID: 2407480
- Website: www.indiancreekvillagefl.gov

Indian Creek is a village, gated community, golf course community, and man-made barrier island in Miami-Dade County, Florida, United States. It has 41 residential home sites and the Indian Creek Country Club, which takes up most of the land on the island. The village is part of the Miami metropolitan area of South Florida. The concentration of highly affluent people on the island has earned it the nickname "Billionaire Bunker". The population was 84 at the 2020 census. The village has its own government and law enforcement.

== History ==
The island of Indian Creek was said to have been created in the 1900s via dredging, due to excavation of drainage for Biscayne Bay, and was an uninhabited and underdeveloped mangrove forest until 1928, when the country club and housing lots were established after a group of Midwestern businessmen bought the island as a real estate venture. The Village of Indian Creek was an unincorporated area until it was incorporated by an act of the Florida Legislature on May 17, 1939, at which point the island had 17 residents and the country club had 180 members. For many years, the island served as a space for vacation rentals for the Miami-area elite, until recent years when elite residents from outside the area began living there full-time.

The golf course on the island was originally built in 1930, and was originally designed by William Flynn, though it suffered from drainage issues for decades and was renovated by Dick Wilson and had tinkering in its history. In 2022, the course was rebuilt by architect Andrew Green, which corrected the drainage issues. In 2025, it was rated the 23rd best golf course in Florida by Golf Digest.

In March 2026, Mark Zuckerberg and Priscilla Chan purchased a home on the island for a Miami-Dade County record of $170 million. It was an unfinished home that had an asking price of $200 million.

== Geography ==
The Village of Indian Creek is located in northeastern Miami-Dade County. It occupies an island bordered by Biscayne Bay to the west, Indian Creek to the south and east, and Indian Creek Lake to the north. Neighboring communities are Bay Harbor Islands to the north, Surfside to the east, Miami Beach to the south, and North Miami to the west, across Biscayne Bay. Automobile access is via a bridge from Surfside.

According to the United States Census Bureau, the village has a total area of 0.47 square miles (1.2 km^{2}). 0.43 square miles (1.1 km^{2}) of it are land and 0.04 square miles (0.10 km^{2}) of it (8.55%) are water.

The island is connected by a bridge which connects the island to Surfside, Florida, and is guarded by a police checkpoint that turns away non-residents and unauthorized persons from visiting the island. The island has only one road, Indian Creek Island road, a 1.6-mile (2.6 km) private two-lane road that goes from the east to the west side of the island and connects the homes and the country club.

=== Climate ===
North Miami Beach has a tropical climate, similar to the climate found in much of the Caribbean. It is part of the only region in the 48 contiguous states that falls under that category. More specifically, it generally has a tropical rainforest climate (Köppen climate classification: Af), bordering a tropical monsoon climate (Köppen climate classification: Am).

== Demographics ==
Historical population
Census	Pop.	Note	%±
1940	17		—
1950	46		170.6%
1960	62		34.8%
1970	82		32.3%
1980	103		25.6%
1990	44		−57.3%
2000	33		−25.0%
2010	86		160.6%
2020	84		−2.3%
U.S. Decennial Census

=== 2010 and 2020 census ===
Indian Creek racial composition (Hispanics excluded from racial categories) (NH = Non-Hispanic)
Race	Pop 2010	Pop 2020	% 2010	% 2020
White (NH)	61	46	70.93%	54.76%
Black or African American (NH)	0	0	0.00%	0.00%
Native American or Alaska Native (NH)	0	0	0.00%	0.00%
Asian (NH)	1	5	1.16%	5.95%
Pacific Islander or Native Hawaiian (NH)	0	0	0.00%	0.00%
Some other race (NH)	0	2	0.00%	2.38%
Two or more races/Multiracial (NH)	0	9	0.00%	10.71%
Hispanic or Latino (any race)	24	22	27.91%	26.19%
Total	86	84		

As of the 2020 United States census, there were 84 people, 12 households, and 10 families residing in the village.

As of 2013, English was the mother tongue for 40.00% of the population, while other Indo-European languages were spoken by 32.70% of all residents. Speakers of Spanish accounted for 27.30%, while the combined total of those who spoke an Asian language or Pacific Islander language made up 0.00%. The rest of the people who spoke any other languages in Indian Creek were at 0.00%. In total, 60.00% of the populace spoke something other than English as their first language.

=== 2000 census ===
In 2000, 14.3% had children under the age of 18 living with them, 50.0% were married couples living together, 28.6% had a female householder with no husband present, and 14.3% were non-families. 14.3% of all households were made up of individuals, and none had someone living alone who was 65 years of age or older. The average household size was 2.36 and the average family size was 2.33.

In 2000, the village population was spread out, with 18.2% under the age of 18, 3.0% from 18 to 24, 30.3% from 25 to 44, 30.3% from 45 to 64, and 18.2% who were 65 years of age or older. The median age was 44 years. For every 100 females, there were 94.1 males. For every 100 females age 18 and over, there were 68.8 males.

== Politics ==
In the 2016 presidential election, Indian Creek went to Republican nominee Donald Trump with 20 votes (56%) while Democratic nominee Hillary Clinton received 16 votes (44%). In the 2020 presidential election, Indian Creek tallied 42 votes (79%) for Republican nominee Trump and 11 votes (21%) for Democratic nominee Joe Biden. In the 2024 presidential election, Republican nominee Trump garnered 32 votes (78%) in Indian Creek to Democratic nominee Kamala Harris's 9 votes (22%).

== Education ==
Residents are assigned to Miami-Dade County Public Schools.

Ruth K. Broad/Bay Harbor K–8 Center in Bay Harbor Islands serves as the local elementary and K–8 school. Residents who want to have a conventional middle school may instead choose the zoned middle school, Miami Beach Nautilus Middle School. Miami Beach Senior High School is the senior high school serving Indian Creek.

== Notable people ==
- Arthur I. Appleton (1915–2008), president of Appleton Electric Company
- Beyoncé (born 1981), (former resident,) singer and wife of Jay-Z
- Jeff Bezos (born 1964), Amazon founder
- Turki bin Abdul Aziz (1934–2016), Saudi prince
- Gilbert Bigio (born 1935), billionaire businessman
- Tom Brady (born 1977), former NFL quarterback
- Norman Braman (born 1932), former Philadelphia Eagles owner and billionaire art collector
- Irma Braman (born 1937), wife of Norman Braman
- Gisele Bundchen (born 1980), supermodel
- Priscilla Chan (born 1985), wife of Mark Zuckerberg
- Robert Diener (born 1958), co-founder of Hotels.com
- Don Francisco (born 1940), television host
- Jaime Gilinski Bacal (born 1957), real estate developer
- Carl Icahn (born 1936), billionaire investor
- Julio Iglesias (born 1943), Spanish singer
- Marko Jaric (born 1978), (former resident,) ex-husband of Adriana Lima and former basketball player
- Jay-Z (born 1969), (former resident,) rapper and husband of Beyoncé
- Charles B. Johnson (born 1933), (former resident,) billionaire businessman
- Jared Kushner (born 1981), son-in-law of Donald Trump
- Eddie Lampert (born 1962), hedge fund billionaire and Sears CEO
- Adriana Lima (born 1981), model
- Elle MacPherson (born 1964), (former resident,) supermodel and ex-wife of Jeffrey Soffer
- Alex Meruelo (born 1964), real estate entrepreneur
- Martha O'Driscoll (1922–1998), actress
- Carlos Peralta Quintero (born 1952), businessman
- Rick Pitino (born 1952), basketball coach
- Craig Robins (born 1963), businessman and husband of Jackie Soffer
- Lauren Sanchez (born 1969), wife of Jeff Bezos
- Barry Schwartz (born 1942), (former resident,) co-founder of Calvin Klein
- Don Shula (1930–2020), longtime Miami Dolphins head coach
- George Smathers (1913–2007), U.S. senator
- Jackie Soffer (born 1966), co-CEO of Turnberry Associates and wife of Craig Robins
- Jeffrey Soffer (born 1968), co-CEO of Turnberry Associates and ex-husband of Elle MacPherson
- Ivanka Trump (born 1981), daughter of Donald Trump
- Mark Zuckerberg (born 1984), Meta Platforms co-founder
