= Jeffrey Soffer =

American real estate developer

- Born: c. 1968
- Occupation: Real estate developer
- Title: Chairman and CEO of Fontainebleau Development
- Relatives: Donald Soffer (father); Jackie Soffer (sister)

Jeffrey Soffer (born c. 1968) is an American real estate developer. He is the chairman and chief executive officer of Fontainebleau Development, a Florida-based real estate company whose holdings include the Fontainebleau Miami Beach hotel and the Fontainebleau Las Vegas resort.

== Early life ==
Soffer is one of seven children of Donald Soffer (1932–2025), a real estate developer who founded Turnberry Associates in 1967 and developed the city of Aventura, Florida.

== Career ==
=== Turnberry Associates and the Fontainebleau Miami Beach ===
For more than two decades, Soffer worked with his sister, Jackie Soffer, managing Turnberry Associates, the family real estate firm. In 2005, Soffer led a Turnberry-related entity in the purchase of the Fontainebleau Miami Beach, and the company invested roughly $500 million in renovations before it reopened in November 2008.

=== Fontainebleau Las Vegas ===
Soffer and casino executive Glenn Schaeffer broke ground on the Fontainebleau Las Vegas in 2007, planning a roughly $2 billion, 3,780-room resort near the Las Vegas Convention Center. Soffer personally guaranteed about $220 million of the project's financing. The project filed for Chapter 11 bankruptcy in June 2009. It was sold to Carl Icahn in a 2010 bankruptcy sale, and in 2017, it was sold to developer Steve Witkoff and Vector Group's Howard Lorber. In February 2021, Soffer reacquired the property through Fontainebleau Development in partnership with Koch Real Estate Investments. Construction resumed in November 2021, and the resort, restored to the Fontainebleau name, opened on December 13, 2023.

=== Fontainebleau Development and other holdings ===
After 25 years as Turnberry Associates partners, Soffer and his sister Jackie Soffer divided their joint real estate holdings in 2019. Jackie retained the Turnberry Associates name, Aventura Mall and several hotel properties. Jeffrey Soffer took the Fontainebleau Miami Beach, the JW Marriott Miami Turnberry Resort & Spa, the Turnberry Ocean Club Residences and the Mardi Gras Casino and Race Track in Hallandale Beach, operating them through his new company, Fontainebleau Development. The siblings continued to jointly hold roughly $1 billion in shared assets, including the Solé Mia mixed-use development in North Miami and Fontainebleau Aviation.

== Personal life ==
Soffer was married to Australian model Elle Macpherson from 2013 until their separation was announced in 2017. As of 2026, his net worth was estimated at $1 billion.
