= Turnberry =

Turnberry may refer to:

== Place ==
=== Canada ===
- Morris-Turnberry, Ontario, a municipality in Huron County, Ontario, Canada

=== United States ===
- Turnberry Associates, a real estate development company based in Florida
- Turnberry Isle Resort and Club, a resort near Miami, Florida
- Turnberry Place, a residential complex in Las Vegas, Nevada
- Turnberry Towers, residential complex in Las Vegas, Nevada

=== United Kingdom ===
- Turnberry, South Ayrshire, a village in South Ayrshire, Scotland, and location where the Battle of Turnberry was fought
- Battle of Turnberry, 1307 battle
- Turnberry Castle, ruins of a former castle in Ayrshire, Scotland
- Turnberry Estate, a residential area in Bloxwich, West Midlands, England
- Turnberry railway station, a railway station in Ayrshire, Scotland serving the Turnberry Resort
- Turnberry (golf course), a golf resort in South Ayrshire, Scotland
- Turnberry Lighthouse, at Turnberry Point, South Ayrshire

== See also ==
- All pages beginning with "Turnberry"
