= Peter Arnell =

American designer and branding executive

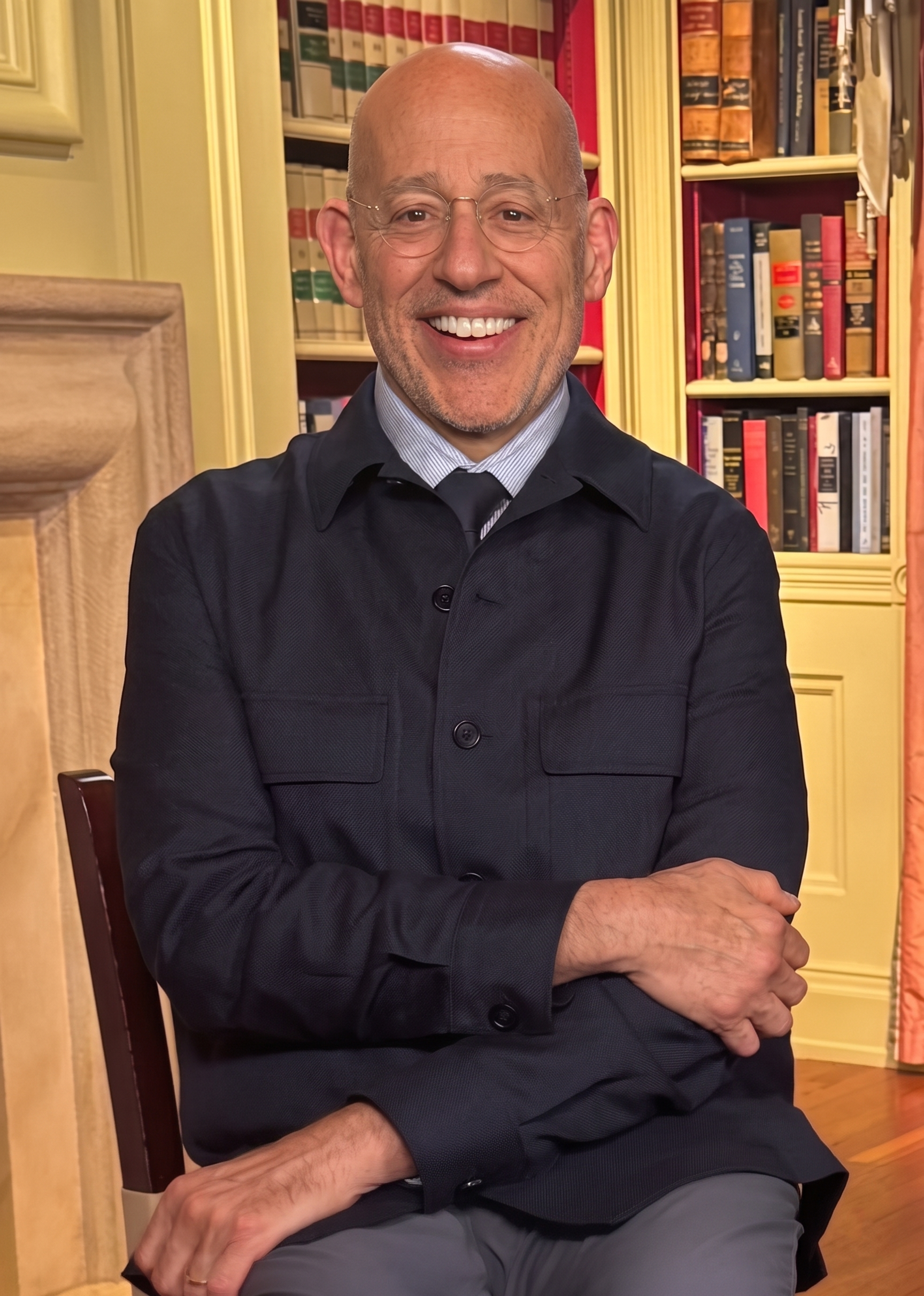

1st Chief Brand Architect of the United States
- Incumbent
- Assumed office May 4, 2026
- President: Donald Trump
- Preceded by: Position established

Personal details
- Born: April 22, 1958 (age 68) Brooklyn, New York, U.S.
- Party: Republican
- Occupation: Designer, branding executive, photographer, author
- Known for: Founder and CEO of Arnell Group
- Website: www.peterarnell.com

Peter Eric Arnell (born April 22, 1958) is an American designer and the first chief brand architect of the US. A branding executive, author, and photographer, he is the founder of Arnell Group and serves in a founding role within the National Design Studio. He is known for creating products, brands, and campaigns for companies including Chrysler, PepsiCo., Reebok, Fontainebleau Resorts, Donna Karan, and Unilever, and he has written extensively on architectural theory and art history.

== Early life and education ==
Arnell was born in Sheepshead Bay, Brooklyn. His father, who changed the family name from Abraben to Arnell, was a mechanical engineer. His grandfather, a Russian immigrant, was a fishmonger; as a child, Arnell sometimes accompanied him to work at the Fulton Fish Market.

Arnell studied architecture at Brooklyn Technical High School. He graduated in 1976.

== Career ==
Arnell started his career as an intern working for Michael Graves. There he met Ted Bickford, and the two collaborated on a series of books about artists and architects before forming Arnell-Bickford in the early 1980s.

Bergdorf Goodman fashion director Dawn Mello hired Arnell-Bickford to create ads for Bergdorf, and they later worked on in-store designs and promotions for Donna Karan's new clothing line. During his work for Donna Karan, Arnell created DKNY and its signature style, first with a black-and-white photograph of the Brooklyn Bridge, and later with DKNY's logo featuring the Statue of Liberty and the Manhattan skyline.

By 1985 the agency's income reached $4.4 million per year, with clients including Anne Klein, Bank of America, Chanel, Condé Nast, Consolidated Edison, Ray-Ban, Rockport and Tommy Hilfiger.

In 1993 Bickford left the company and Arnell renamed it Arnell Group.

Arnell partnered with architect Frank Gehry on projects such as the Barclays Center and the Sentosa resort and aquarium between 2006 and 2010.

In early 2000 Arnell sold a 55% stake in Arnell Group to Draft Worldwide, and the firm became AG Worldwide. Shortly after in 2001, Arnell bought back his shares from Draft and sold the entire firm to Omnicom Group (NYSE:OMC). In 2008, AG was hired to redesign the logo for Pepsi and Tropicana. For both companies, Arnell wanted to "evolve [it] to a more modern state" but the rebrand for Tropicana was scrapped after being poorly received by consumers.

Arnell remained chairman and Chief creative officer until 2011, when he left Omnicom amidst disputes with the company which were then settled in 2012.

Arnell founded Intellectual Capital Investments (ICI) in New York City in 2011. In 2013, Arnell worked with former Prime Minister Thaksin Shinawatra to create ThaiWorks for SMEs (small and medium enterprises), artisans and OTOP's of Thailand. He has also worked with GNC, Digicel, Fontainebleau Resorts and Lowe's Home Improvement.

In 2014 Arnell's photography was showcased in Milk Gallery in New York City.

Arnell, in his role as chief brand and design officer for Fontainebleau Development, designed the animation for the Times Square Ball for New Years' celebrations of 2024. The 'bow tie' design Arnell used connected the New Years event with the 70th anniversary of the opening of the Fontainebleau Miami Beach and the inaugural opening of the Fontainebleau Las Vegas hotels.

Arnell was also responsible for the design and architecture of the "Hall of Excellence," a museum housed in the Fontainebleau Las Vegas featuring sports memorabilia from the collections of Tom Brady and Jim Gray, which opened in early 2024.

In early 2026 Arnell created a commercial for Make America Healthy Again (MAHA) featuring Mike Tyson, which aired during Super Bowl LX. In May 2026, the White House named Arnell the first Chief Brand Architect of the United States of America, a founding role within the National Design Studio, where he serves alongside U.S. Chief Design Officer Joe Gebbia to help implement Executive Order 14338, "Improving Our Nation Through Better Design.".

=== Community service ===
Arnell created the identity and graphics for the Council of Fashion Designers of America's "Fashion for Haiti" fundraising drive after the earthquake in 2010, and the charity shirt "Fashion for America," which raised $2 million for the 9/11 Twin Towers Fund in 2001. He designed the 9/11 Tribute Museum's exhibit to commemorate the rescue workers.

Arnell has worked with the New York City Fire Department (FDNY) and the FDNY Foundation on safety campaigns.

== Publications ==
Arnell has written, edited and contributed to over 20 additional publications in architecture, art history, photography and branding.

His works include:

- Shift: How to Reinvent Your Business, Your Career, and Your Personal Brand (Random House 2010)
- Gucci: The Making of (Rizzoli 2011)
- O Wonderful, Wonderful and Most Wonderful, Wonderful! And Yet Again Wonderful--: Portraits of Our U.S. Olympic Hopefuls (Sidney Press, 1991)
- Peter Arnell Portfolio 1980–2020 (Hatje Cantz 2020)

== Selected awards and recognition ==
Several of Arnell's ads and campaigns have won awards, including:

2003: Cannes Gold Lion for Best in Category – "Terry Tate, Office Linebacker"

2007: Ellis Island Medal of Honor
