= Stephen Muss =

American real estate developer (1928–2025)

- Born: August 4, 1928; New York City, U.S.
- Died: August 23, 2025 (aged 97); Williamstown, Massachusetts, U.S.
- Occupation(s): Businessman, investor, philanthropist
- Known for: Presiding over the resurgence and redevelopment of Miami Beach, Florida
- Spouses: Carol Matelson (divorced); Maureen Haver (died 1993); Sandra Paul (divorced)
- Children: 5
- Parent: Alexander Muss
- Family: Isaac Muss (grandfather)

Stephen Hobart Muss (August 4, 1928 – August 23, 2025) was an American businessman, investor, and philanthropist known for leading the resurgence and redevelopment of Miami Beach, Florida.

== Early life and education ==
Stephen Hobart Muss was born to a Jewish family on August 4, 1928, in New York City, and raised in Bensonhurst, Brooklyn. His father, Alexander, was one of eleven children, six of them brothers who worked for their father's construction company building homes during and after the Great Depression. Muss was educated at Erasmus Hall High School. He worked for the family business first as a laborer and then in sales and construction supervision.

== Career ==
Muss eventually went into a partnership with his father, founding Alexander Muss & Sons and developing 30 acres of tract homes on Long Island. From 1952 through 1968, they went on to develop over 20 subdivisions with about 20,000 houses in the New York City borough of Queens, in New Jersey, and on Long Island; they also built over 4,000 multifamily units. In the 1950s, his family moved to Florida where his father, now a multi-millionaire, built the Seacoast Towers in Miami Beach, known for the distinctive MiMO architectural style, the Towers of Key Biscayne, and the Towers of Quayside. In 1967, Stephen took over the Florida business, now named the Muss Organization, becoming Miami Beach's single largest landlord.

In 1978, Muss bought the largest hotel in Miami-Dade County, the aging Fontainebleau Hotel), for $27 million, rescuing it from bankruptcy. He injected an additional $100 million into the hotel for improvements and hired the Hilton company to manage it. In 2005, the Muss Organization sold the Fontainebleau to Donald Soffer's Turnberry Associates for $165 million.

Muss was instrumental in getting Miami Beach to implement a 3% "bed" tax to rebuild the city's aging infrastructure, including refurbishing and expanding its convention center. He was the president of the Miami Beach Redevelopment Agency. In 1994, he sold the Seacoast Towers for $94 million.

== Philanthropy ==
Muss was the chairman of the Alexander Muss High School in Israel and honorary chairman of the Lapid Coalition for High School Age Programs in Israel. Muss served as Board Chair of Temple Emanu-El in Miami Beach and also served on the board of the Miami Art Museum and on the Board of Governors of Haifa University.

== Personal life and death ==
Muss had three children with Carol Matelson, in a marriage that ended in divorce; he also had two children from his later marriage to Maureen Haver, who died in 1993. Afterwards he married Sandra Paul, the ex-wife of his friend and CenTrust banker David L. Paul. Their marriage also ended in divorce. Muss was a member of Temple Emanu-El in Miami Beach. In later years, Muss was in a relationship with Amy Jeschawitz.

Muss died at his home in Williamstown, Massachusetts, on August 23, 2025, at the age of 97.
