= MGM Grand Adventures =

1993–2000 amusement park in Nevada, United States

- Interactive map of MGM Grand Adventures
- Location: MGM Grand, Paradise, Nevada
- Coordinates: 36°6′24″N 115°9′53″W
- Status: Defunct
- Opened: December 18, 1993
- Closed: September 4, 2000; 25 years ago
- Owner: MGM Grand, Inc.
- Operated by: MGM Grand, Inc.
- Theme: Movie studio
- Operating season: Year-round (until 1998)
- Area: 33 acres (13 ha) (originally); 18.8 acres (7.6 ha) (after 1997)

Attractions
- Total: 7 (as of 1994)
- Roller coasters: 1
- Water rides: 2

MGM Grand Adventures was a theme park adjacent to the MGM Grand, a hotel and casino located on the Las Vegas Strip in Paradise, Nevada, United States. The theme park and resort were both developed by MGM Grand, Inc. Construction began in October 1991, and both projects opened on December 18, 1993. MGM Grand Adventures originally occupied 33 acres (13 ha), located northeast of the MGM Grand. The park featured a movie studio theme. It included seven rides and four theaters offering various shows.

The park suffered financially, in part due to a low number of attractions. It also faced competition from the indoor Adventuredome amusement park, also on the Strip. In 1997, the MGM Grand began construction on a pool, a spa, and a conference center, taking up 15 acres (6.1 ha) of theme park land. The park was reduced by 40 percent to 18.8 acres (7.6 ha). In 1998, the park switched to a seasonal schedule. It closed for the season on September 4, 2000, and never reopened to the public. In 2001, the theme park became a rental facility for corporate functions under the name The Park at MGM Grand. It operated this way for the next few years, offering a reduced number of rides.

A condo hotel project, The Signature at MGM Grand, opened on a portion of the theme park land in 2006. Topgolf opened one of its driving ranges on the remaining acreage in 2016.

== History ==
Disney won the rights to use the Metro-Goldwyn-Mayer (MGM) name for theme parks in 1985, opening Disney-MGM Studios in Florida four years later. Separate plans by MGM Grand, Inc. were announced in October 1989 for an MGM-branded theme park in Las Vegas, which began construction two years later. Disney challenged the Las Vegas project over its name, accusing MGM of trying to harm business at its Florida park. A judge ruled against Disney in 1992, allowing the Las Vegas park to retain its name.

MGM Grand Adventures was built along with the MGM Grand resort, both opened on December 18, 1993. The theme park was built at a cost of $120 million. It originally occupied 33 acres, located northeast of the resort. The property was previously used for the Tropicana Country Club. The park was built at time when Las Vegas was aiming to become a family friendly tourist destination. The park's general manager and his team spent a year studying the Opryland and Fiesta Texas theme parks for guidance.

MGM Grand Adventures opened with expensive ticket prices, which were reduced shortly thereafter. In 1996, the MGM Grand announced an $8 million reconfiguration of the park, which had performed below expectations. In 1997, the MGM Grand resort began construction on a pool, a spa, and a 380,000 sq ft (35,000 m^{2}) conference center. They were built on 15 acres of land previously occupied by MGM Grand Adventures, reducing the park to 18.8 acres.

In 1998, MGM Grand Adventures switched to a seasonal operation, with the park usually re-opening in April and continuing operations through the summer. To promote the 1999 video game Super Smash Bros., MGM Grand Adventures hosted Slamfest '99, a mock-wrestling match. It featured characters from the game – including Mario, Donkey Kong, Pikachu, and Yoshi – who fought each other in a free for all, like the game itself.

In mid-2000, MGM Mirage (previously MGM Grand, Inc.) reviewed the park's land for possible alternative uses, despite being pleased with its performance. The park closed for the season on September 4, 2000. At the end of the month, MGM Mirage began putting all of the rides and attractions up for sale, while stating that the park could re-open in 2001 if the equipment could not be sold for an adequate price.

In February 2001, plans were announced to rename MGM Grand Adventures as The Park at MGM, offering a reduced number of rides. The park would only be open for corporate group business and special events with 50 or more people, with general admission tickets no longer issued. Keeping the park open for special events was a way to generate income while still considering other options for the land, including the development of timeshares, luxury condominiums, entertainment complexes, or additional casino and hotel space. The park remained open for corporate events into 2003, and became popular for its annual Jimmy Buffett concerts.

In December 2002, MGM Mirage announced plans to build several condo hotel towers on a portion of the theme park land. Construction on the new project was underway in 2004, and it opened two years later as The Signature at MGM Grand. Topgolf opened one of its driving ranges on the remaining acreage in 2016.

== Features and attractions ==
MGM Grand Adventures featured a movie studio theme. It had several themed areas, including Casablanca Plaza, New York Street, Asian Village, French Street, Salem Waterfront, Tumbleweed Gulch, Rio Grande Cantina, New Orleans Street, and Olde England Street. From 1994 to 1997, the park was renamed Scream Park each October for Halloween. This separate admission event included several haunted houses in and around the park's attractions. From 1995 to 1997, the park also offered an annual Holiday Wonderland each December, featuring Christmas-themed entertainment.

MGM Grand Adventures could handle 16,000 people, although capacity was capped at 8,000 to prevent long lines, a common complaint at Disneyland in California. Most of the waiting areas, both indoor and outdoor, also featured air-conditioning and heating. The park featured costumed walkaround characters such as King Looey, the park's mascot. Future actor Wayne Brady worked as one of the park's performers during the 1990s, playing various characters. The park also featured various food options, including Burger King and Nathan's Famous.

Early on, the park featured seven rides:

- Backlot River Tour - A 15-minute boat ride through simulated film sets, including a jungle and an American Civil War zone.
- Deep Earth Exploration - A motion simulator ride opened in 1994. It was set on a 352-foot track, with riders taking a journey to the center of the Earth.
- The Haunted Mine - Passengers boarded ore cars on a trip into an abandoned mining operation.
- Grand Canyon Rapids - A white water rapids raft ride with special effects such as an old west gun fight and a tunnel explosion.
- Lightning Bolt - An indoor, space-themed roller coaster with a top speed of 35 mph. In 1997, the roller coaster was moved outdoors to the northern end of the park. Its track was expanded to 2,400 feet, roughly doubled in size from the original. The new track traveled over the Grand Canyon Rapids and rose up to 70 feet.
- Over the Edge - A log flume ride through an old sawmill, with two drops of 25 ft (7.6 m) and 40 ft (12 m), and a top speed of 25 mph.
- Parisian Taxis - Bumper cars on the streets of Paris.

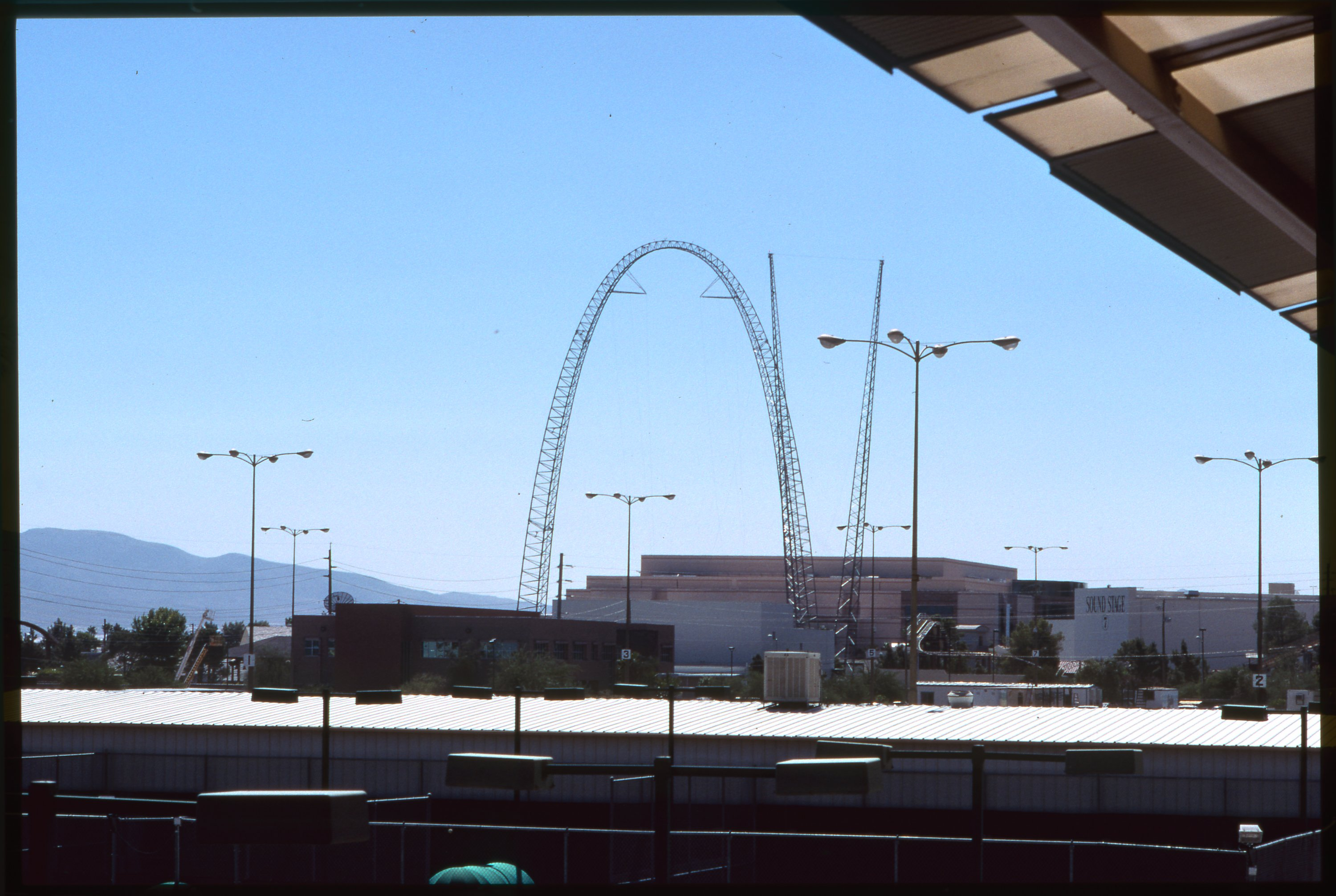
SkyScreamer, September 1999

An additional ride, SkyScreamer, opened on September 2, 1996. It was a 250-foot-tall (76 m) skycoaster. Riders were strapped into harnesses and lifted up a 220-foot (67 m) launch tower where they then pulled a ripcord, setting into motion a 100-foot free fall upwards of 70 mph (110 km/h). As of 2000, it was the world's largest skycoaster. The ride would later be installed as part of a 2013 expansion at the Fun Spot America theme park in Florida.

The park included several theaters and opened with five shows:

- Pirates' Cove - A 950-seat outdoor theater, complete with a pirate ship and lagoon that were home to the Dueling Pirates Stunt Spectacular.
- Magic Screen Theatre - An indoor 750-seat theater. It opened with two shows: a special-effects musical revue called Kaleidoscope, and a live recreation of The Three Stooges. As of 2000, it hosted BMX Grind, a stunt show featuring BMX and in-line skating. The venue was also used as a television production facility. It briefly hosted Penn & Teller's Sin City Spectacular and Donny & Marie in 1999, and a short-lived talent search program by Ed McMahon in 2001.
- King Looey Theatre (later Manhattan Theatre) - An indoor theater that hosted a variety of shows, including an ice-skating spectacle in 1994.
- You're in the Movies (later Gold Rush Theatre) - A 650-seat indoor theater which originally allowed participants to re-enact scenes from classic films and television shows.

The 40-percent reduction in acreage during the late 1990s entailed the removal of the Backlot River Tour, Deep Earth Exploration, and Manhattan Theatre. Although unaffected by the layout change, The Haunted Mine was also closed. During its final year, the park had several additional rides, including Les Bumper Boats, Pedalin' PaddleBoats, the Red Baron airplane ride, and a rock-climbing wall. When the property rebranded as The Park at MGM Grand, it retained the remaining theaters as well as three rides: SkyScreamer, Lightning Bolt, and Parisian Taxis. It also added team building activities such as obstacle courses.

== Reception ==
Architecture critic Blair Kamin, writing for the Chicago Tribune in 1994, called the park "an uninspired copy of Disneyland" with "unconvincing re-creations of historic streets." During the same year, Alex Beam of Forbes wrote, "The nicest thing one can say about MGM's Grand Adventures theme park is that it isn't very crowded, for reasons that will become clear should you visit." Meanwhile, Michael A. Hiltzik of the Los Angeles Times wrote that MGM "oversold its theme park's quality without devoting to it sufficient imagination and expense." He also criticized the park's outdoor setting as another drawback, noting that local temperatures can reach over 100 degrees during the summer. The park had trouble competing against the Adventuredome, an indoor climate-controlled amusement park that also opened on the Las Vegas Strip in 1993.

The Las Vegas Review-Journal opined in 1999 that the park "failed to take into consideration that a third of its visitors come from California where theme parks are ubiquitous and always racing to unveil the latest in thrill rides." Following its closure, the Las Vegas Sun reported that the park "flopped because it lacked any exciting rides". The park's failure was also attributed to its small size and low number of attractions.
