= Don Soffer Aventura High School =

Charter school in Florida, United States

Coordinates: 25.9738°N 80.1369°W

Information
- School type: Charter school
- Established: August 2019; 6 years ago
- Grades: 9-12
- Website: www.aventuracharterhs.org

Don Soffer Aventura High School (DSAHS) is a charter high school in Aventura, Florida.

== History ==
By the 2010s, Aventura area parents sought a high school within the city limits, driven in part by perceptions that the Miami Dade County Public Schools-operated Krop High School had become overcrowded. In 2012, Frida Lapidot, president of Parents for Aventura Charter High School Association, gathered more than 1900 online petition signatures supporting construction of a charter high school and attempted to influence the November city election by leveraging parent support for candidates who backed the proposal. Parents cited Krop's reported capacity of 121 percent and expressed concerns about safety, though principal Dawn Baglos disputed these characterizations.

Mayor Susan Gottlieb and the city council declined to proceed with the proposal, stating that purchasing land and constructing a high school could require substantial tax increases. School Board member Martin Karp noted that Krop's enrollment had decreased by more than 1000 students over four years to 2733 students following construction of Alonzo and Tracy Mourning Senior High and that the school maintained an A rating from the Florida Department of Education. According to Colleen Wright of the Miami Herald, demand persisted as newer schools overshadowed Krop's reputation.

The Aventura city government later purchased the school site from Gulfstream Park Racing and Casino for a facility designed to accommodate 800 students across 53,000 square feet (4,900 m^{2}). Don Soffer Aventura High School opened in August 2019 with more than 100 students while construction remained incomplete.
