= The Signature at MGM Grand =

Condo-hotel at the MGM Grand resort in Paradise, Nevada, near the Las Vegas Strip

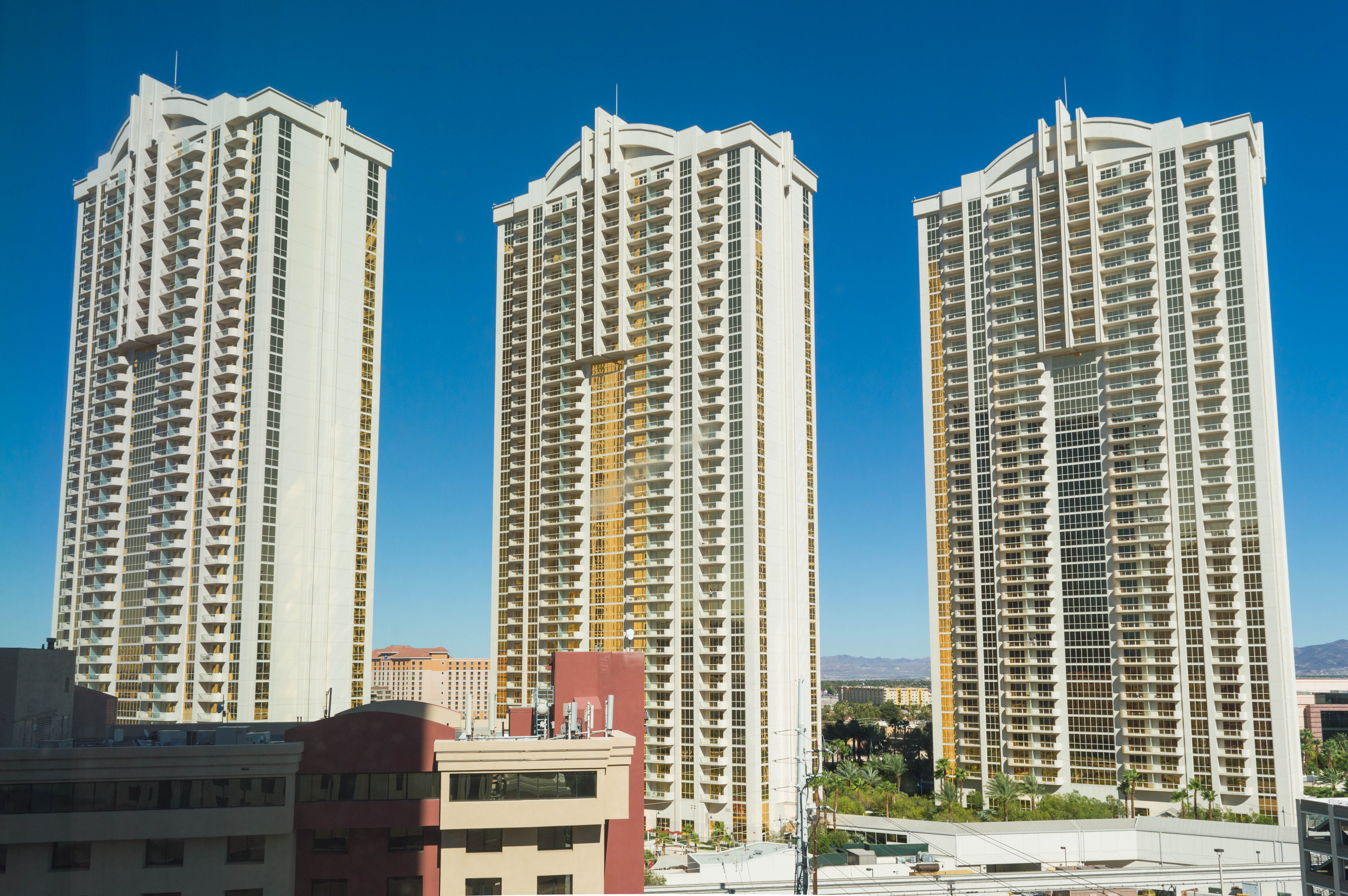
- Interactive map of the The Signature at MGM Grand area
- Alternative names: The Residences at MGM Grand

General information
- Status: Operating
- Type: Condo-hotel
- Location: Paradise, Nevada, U.S., 145 East Harmon Avenue
- Coordinates: 36°06′24″N 115°10′00″W
- Construction started: 2004
- Opening: May 2006; 19 years ago
- Owner: MGM Resorts International

Technical details
- Floor count: 38

Design and construction
- Architecture firm: Bergman Walls & Associates
- Developer: Turnberry Associates/MGM Grand Towers LLC

Other information
- Number of rooms: 1,728

Website
- signaturemgmgrand.com

The Signature at MGM Grand is a condo-hotel at the MGM Grand resort in Paradise, Nevada, near the Las Vegas Strip. It consists of three towers, each 38 stories in height, with a total of 1,728 units. All three towers are connected to the MGM Grand. MGM Mirage and Turnberry Associates partnered to develop the project, which was announced in 2002. Construction was underway in 2004, and the first tower opened in May 2006. The project was built on land previously used by the MGM Grand Adventures Theme Park.

Individual buyers in the project had the option of renting out their unit and splitting the profit with MGM. Starting in 2007, hundreds of buyers filed suit against the property, alleging misleading sales pitches and income that was lower than expected.

== History ==
Part of the property was previously occupied by the MGM Grand Adventures Theme Park, which was built just northeast of the MGM Grand resort; both opened in 1993. On December 5, 2002, MGM Mirage announced that it had partnered with Turnberry Associates to build a condominium and hotel complex on the property, following the closure of the theme park earlier that year. The project was part of an ongoing trend to build luxury condominiums in Las Vegas. Turnberry had previously developed the Turnberry Place condominium project, also located near the Las Vegas Strip.

Unit sales for the condo-hotel project, known then as The Residences at MGM Grand, began in early 2004. The property could accommodate up to six towers, and the ultimate number of towers was dependent on sales. A total of three towers was ultimately decided upon.

Construction of the first tower was underway later in 2004, near the corner of Harmon Avenue and Koval Lane. Construction of the second tower was expected to begin in early 2005. Excavation for the final tower was underway in September 2005, three months earlier than initially planned. Construction began early after more than half of the tower's 576 units were sold. The first tower was topped off on October 7, 2005, and was opened in May 2006. The second tower was finished later that year, and the third was scheduled to open in July 2007.

It was the first condo-hotel to open near the Las Vegas Strip. The project was designed by Bergman Walls & Associates. The tower exteriors feature gold glass, and each building is 38 stories. Buyers had the option of renting out their units and splitting the profit with MGM. Each tower was built with 576 units, and 90 percent of them were expected to be managed by the MGM Grand as condo-hotel units.

The Signature was built with its own entrance, and it had a staff of bellhop, concierge and valet employees that was separate from the main resort. Residents had access to the resort's amenities, and a moving walkway connected each tower to the resort. The Signature property included a pool and a Starbucks. Eventually, the property also started offering cooking classes with hotel chefs, through 30-minute television programs.

The project's 1,728 units were largely sold prior to the Great Recession. In 2007, more than 40 buyers filed suit against the property with allegations of misleading sales pitches and income that was lower than expected. MGM stated that the poor state of the economy was to blame for low rental rates, while buyers stated that the low rates had started before the economic downturn. By May 2009, the case had grown to nine lawsuits and more than 300 buyers. Meanwhile, unit prices had dropped 70 percent. Most of the unit sales at that time were resales or repossessions.

In 2012, a judge ordered that 102 buyers in the case proceed through arbitration. The project developer, Turnberry/MGM Grand Towers LLC, filed for chapter 11 bankruptcy in 2015. A lawyer for 545 buyers alleged that the bankruptcy filing was an attempt to delay discovery in the ongoing buyer suit.

== Gallery ==
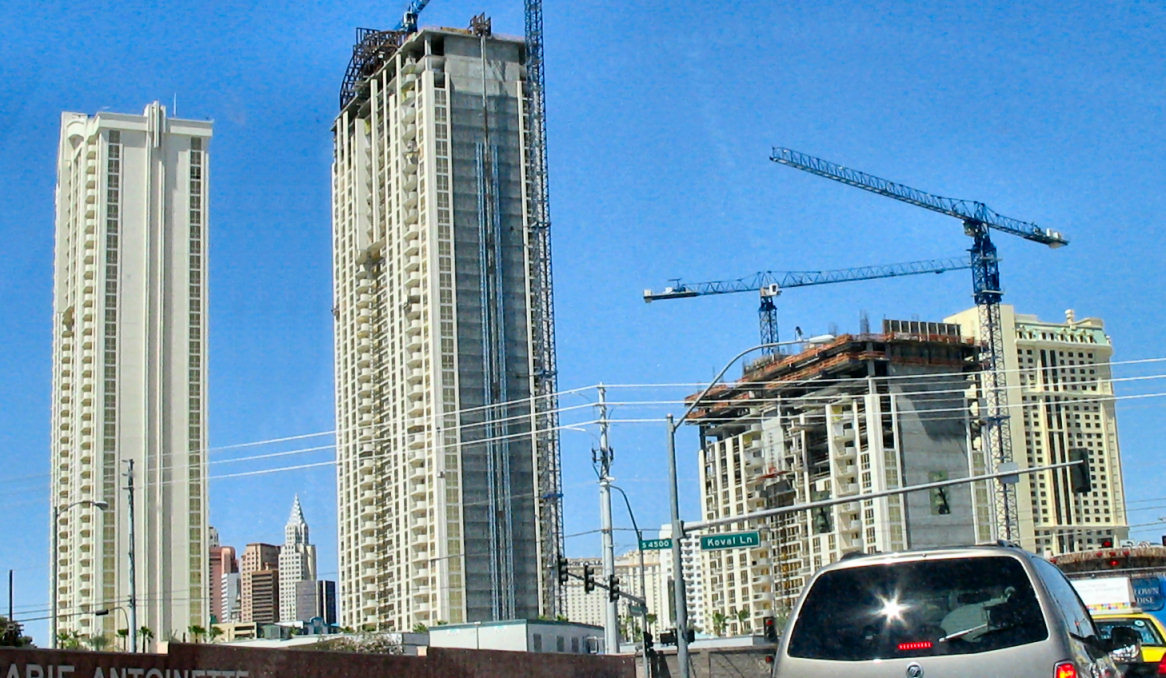
Construction in 2006

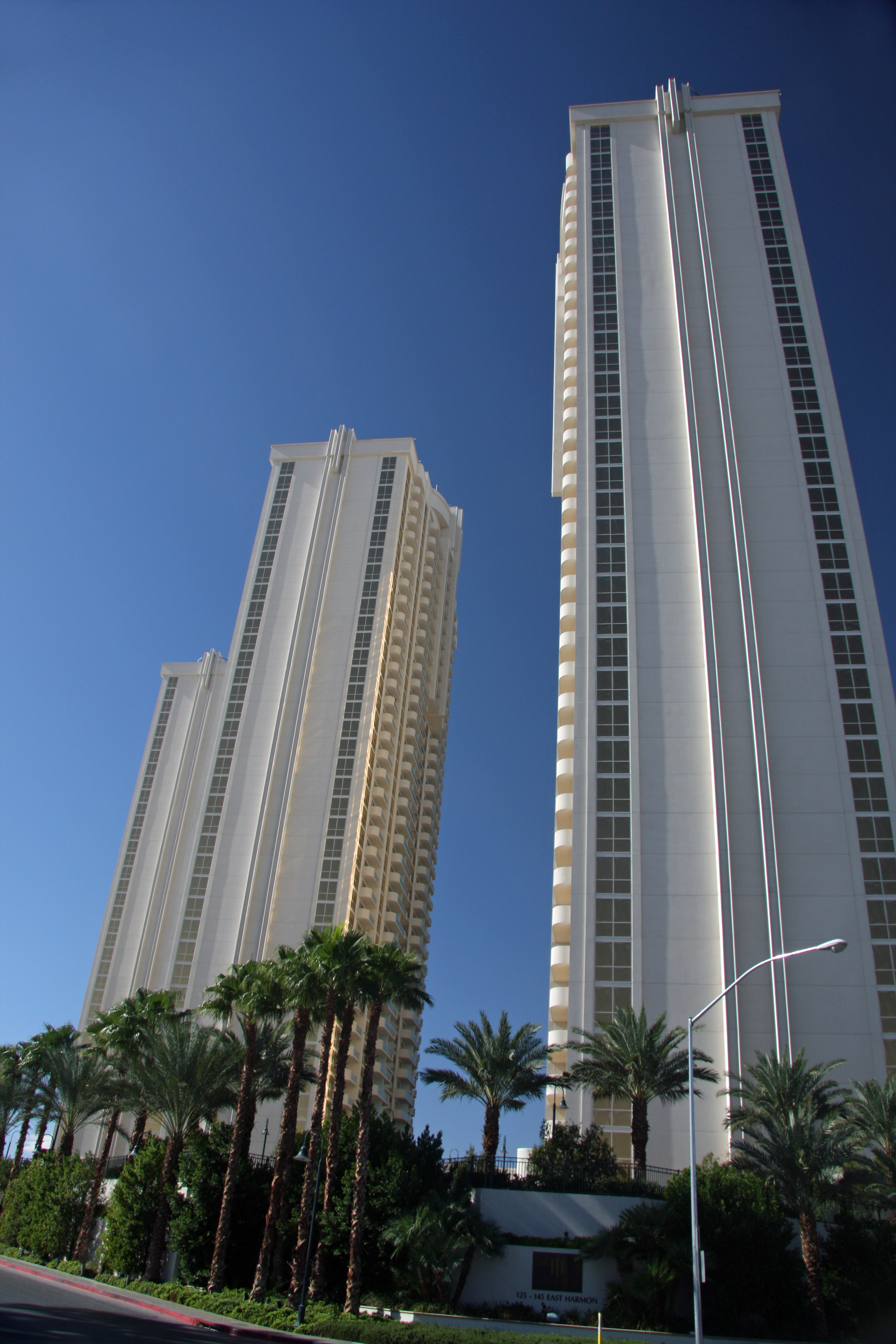
View from East Harmon Avenue

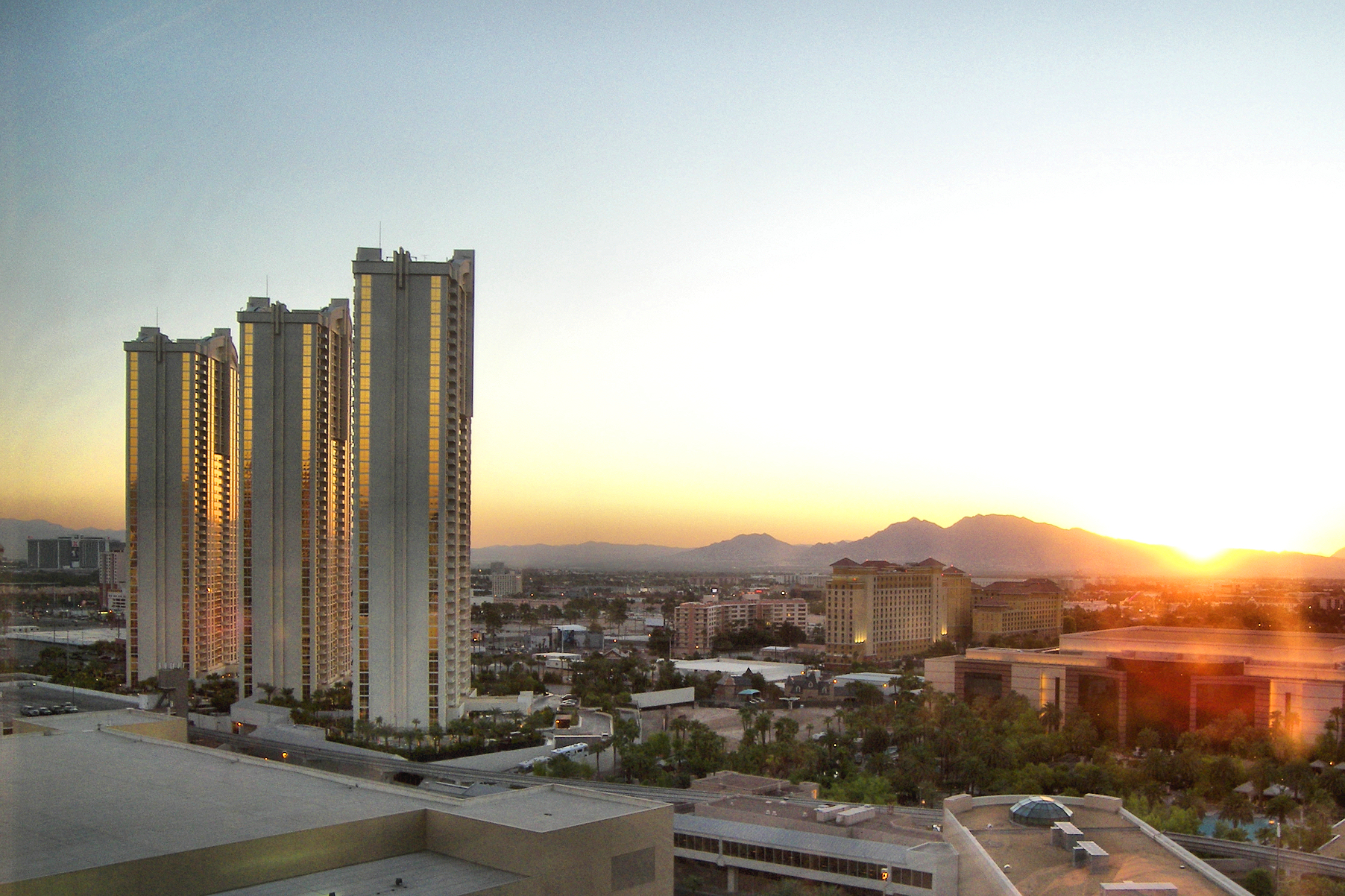
The Signature in 2007, with the walkway to the MGM Grand visible

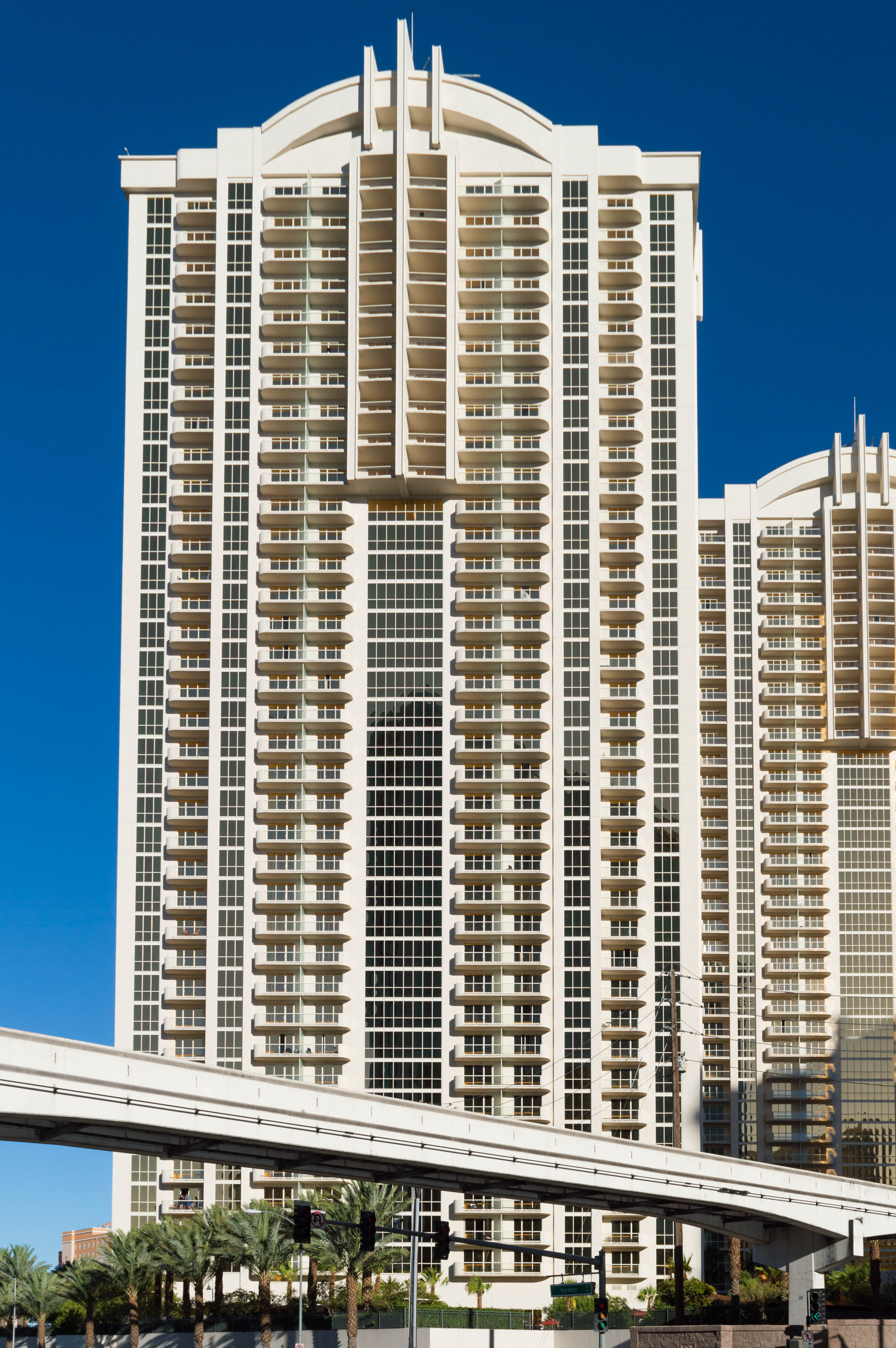
The Signature in 2015

== See also ==
- List of integrated resorts
