= JW Marriott Miami Turnberry Resort & Spa =

JW Marriott Turnberry Miami Resort & Spa
- Interactive map of the JW Marriott Turnberry Miami Resort & Spa area

General information
- Status: Operating
- Location: Aventura, Florida, United States, 19999 W. Country Dr.
- Coordinates: 25°57′36″N 80°08′17″W
- Opening: November 7, 1967; 58 years ago
- Renovated: December 19, 2018; 7 years ago
- Owner: Fontainebleau Development
- Management: JW Marriott Hotels

Technical details
- Floor area: 420 m^{2} (4,500 sq ft)

Other information
- Number of rooms: 685
- Number of restaurants: 5

Website
- Official website

JW Marriott Miami Turnberry Resort & Spa is a luxury resort in the city of Aventura, Florida. It features golf courses designed by Robert Trent Jones, a spa, tennis facilities, and restaurants.

== History ==
The resort was developed by Donald Soffer, Mark E. Mason, Eugene Lebowitz, and Edward J. Lewis of Oxford Development. In 1988, Donald Soffer sold a 50% interest in the property to Rafael Hotels for $20 million. In 1996, the property underwent a renovation and expansion. The remaining interest was later sold to Rafael Hotels. The property was managed by the Mandarin Oriental Hotel group after Mandarin acquired the Rafael Group. Soffer's Turnberry Associates reacquired the property in 2005. In August 2011, Turnberry ousted hotel manager Fairmont Hotels and Resorts. In May 2012, the property became part of the Autograph Collection Hotels. In 2017, Turnberry announced plans for the expansion of the property, including a re-branding into a JW Marriott property performed by Nichols Architects.

Completed in 2019, the 270-acre resort now includes 685 guest rooms, two golf courses, 120,000 square feet of meeting and event space, six restaurants and lounges, a waterpark, and a 25,000-square-foot spa.
