= Donald Soffer =

American businessman (1932–2025)

- Born: Donald Morley Soffer; September 20, 1932; Duquesne, Pennsylvania, U.S.
- Died: July 20, 2025 (aged 92); Aventura, Florida, U.S.
- Education: Brandeis University (B.A.)
- Occupations: Businessman, investor, philanthropist
- Known for: Development of Aventura, Florida
- Spouse: Michele King (m. 2013)
- Children: 7
- Family: Joseph Soffer (uncle); Elle Macpherson (onetime daughter-in-law); Craig Robins (son-in-law); Jeffrey Soffer (son)

Donald Morley Soffer (September 20, 1932 – July 20, 2025) was an American businessman, investor, and philanthropist. He was a real estate developer who developed Florida swampland into what was to become the city of Aventura, Florida.

== Early life and education ==
Soffer was born to a Jewish family in Duquesne, Pennsylvania, near Pittsburgh, the son of Ida (née Kessler) and businessman Harold "Harry" Soffer who made a living selling appliances and owned a Studebaker car dealership. Harold's brother was Joseph Soffer (who would found the Pittsburgh-based real estate development company, the Soffer Organization). In 1955, he graduated from Brandeis University on a football scholarship with a B.A. in economics. After graduation, he returned to Pittsburgh and ventured into the construction and real estate business. He first built shopping malls for Don Mark Realty, a partnership founded by his father, Edward J. Lewis, Lewis' father, Eugene Lebowitz, and Lewis' brother-in-law, Mark Mason (Don Mark Realty would be renamed the Oxford Development Company). In 1965, Don Mark built South Hills Village, Pittsburgh's first indoor mall. In 1967, with funding from the John Hancock Life Insurance Company, Oxford Development partnered with Arthur G. Cohen and his Arlen Realty and Development Corporation to form the DonArl Partnership and bought 785 acres of mostly swampland in South Florida for $6 million.

== Career ==
Donald Soffer was given the primary responsibility to develop the Florida project. Originally named Turnberry, Soffer renamed the site Aventura (Spanish for adventure) and set about to build an upper-class development centered around the Turnberry Country Club with a golf course designed by architect Robert Trent Jones. The project required that he drain the swamps and re-zone the property from residential single family to high-rise development. With the support of then Governor of Florida, Claude Kirk, the development went ahead. In 1969, Metro-Dade County approved the 23,900 condominium unit master plan which included the construction of a fire station, a library, and a causeway to Sunny Isles Beach. They completed the first stage in 1970 and by 1977 had completed the golf course and added another 4,000 units. The venture was very profitable as they purchased land at $5,000 an acre and sold plots for as high as $2 million an acre in 1981.

Soffer's father died in 1972 at the age of 63 and Soffer took control of the family interest in DonArl. In 1977, the partnership with Arlen Realty was dissolved over disputes about the quality of construction with Soffer believing Arlen wanted to build too quick and cheap which would harm the brand. They divided the properties and Soffer formed Turnberry Associates out of his share. In 1983, Arlen Realty defaulted on a $39 million mortgage and went into Chapter 11 bankruptcy and Soffer and his partners purchased the remaining 68 acres of undeveloped land and built the Aventura Mall. Soon after, the remaining three partners sold their interest to the Soffers. Turnberry Isle Resort quickly earned a reputation as the playground for the rich and famous; Soffer even chartered a fleet of yachts to dock at the Turnberry Isle marina to attract the requisite clientele (including a yacht named Monkey Business, which Colorado Democratic U.S. Senator and presidential candidate Gary Hart would charter in 1987 and be photographed with Donna Rice sitting on his lap). In 1987, his son Jeffrey joined the firm and in 1989, Jackie, his daughter joined the firm. In 1988, Soffer sold half his interest in Turnberry Isle Resort to Rafael Hotels for $20 million; in the early 1990s, he sold the remainder to Rafael. In the 90s the siblings took on greater leadership roles in the company. Jeffrey Soffer was put in charge of new condo developments and Jackie Soffer, led leasing operations at the Aventura Mall and other assets.

In 2005, Turnberry Associates purchased the Fontainebleau Hotel (founded by Ben Novack) from Stephen Muss for $165 million.

After 25 years as partners in 2019 the Soffer siblings divided the company assets into two separate companies. Jackie Soffer is the current chairman and CEO of Turnberry Associates, the development firm launched 50 years ago by Donald Soffer. Turnberry was the principal owner of Aventura Mall, the Town Center Aventura, and three hotels in Aventura — Residence Inn by Marriott, Courtyard by Marriott, and Hampton Inn — as well as another hotel in Orlando. Jackie Soffer and Turnberry are also developing an 800-key Miami Beach Convention Center hotel in partnership with Terra Group and David Martin.

As of July 2015, Donald Soffer and his family were worth $2.2 billion.

== Philanthropy ==
In 2008, Soffer donated $15 million to Brandeis University, the largest gift in the college's history.

== Personal life ==
Soffer was married five times and had seven children. He was divorced from Carol Miller Soffer, Patricia Jo Hogue Soffer, and Marjorie Wallace Soffer. In 2013, he married his fifth wife, Michele King Soffer. His son, Jeffrey Soffer, was married to supermodel Elle Macpherson. His daughter, Jackie Soffer, is the CEO of Turnberry today and is married to Miami Beach real estate developer Craig Robins. His daughter, Brooke Soffer, operates various stores in the Aventura Mall and his son, Rock, also works in the family business.

Soffer died in Aventura on July 20, 2025, at the age of 92.

== Legacy ==
Don Soffer Aventura Charter High School is named after him.
