= Fontainebleau Miami Beach =

Hotel in Miami Beach, Florida

- U.S. National Register of Historic Places
- Miami Landmark
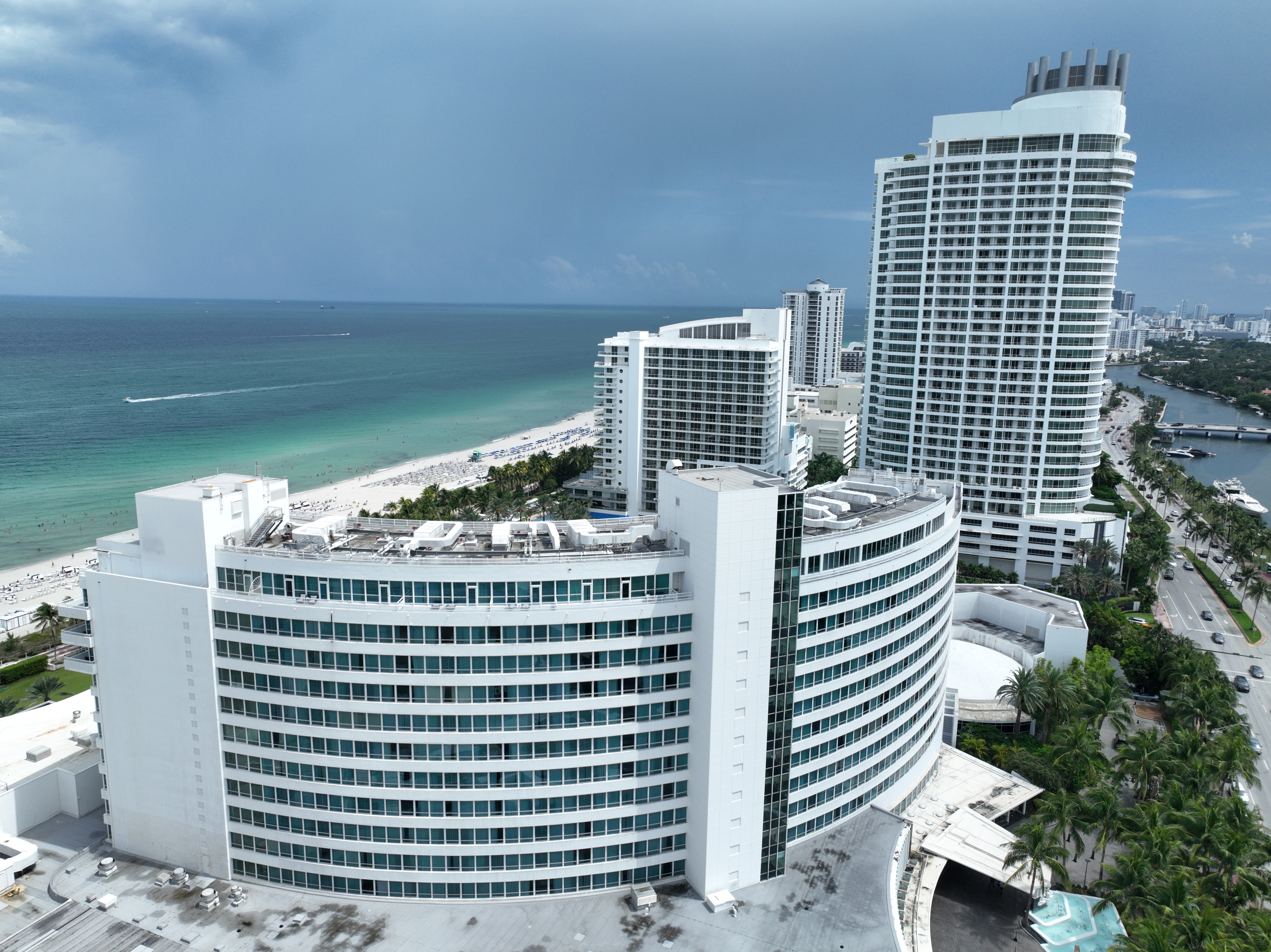
- Fontainebleau Miami Beach in 2025

- Location within Miami
- Location: 4441 Collins Ave, Miami Beach, Florida, U.S. 33140
- Coordinates: 25°49′5″N 80°7′20″W
- Area: 180,525 m^{2} (1,943,150 sq ft)
- Built: 1954; 72 years ago
- Architect: Morris Lapidus
- Architectural style: Miami Modern Architecture (MiMo)
- Visitation: 16,349,845 (2015)
- Website: www.fontainebleau.com
- NRHP reference No.: 08001318

Significant dates
- Added to NRHP: December 22, 2008
- Designated MFL: December 9, 2011

The Fontainebleau Miami Beach, also known as the Fontainebleau Hotel, is a hotel in Miami Beach, Florida, United States. Designed by Morris Lapidus, the luxury hotel opened in 1954. In 2007, the Fontainebleau Hotel was ranked ninety-third in the American Institute of Architects' (AIA) list of "America's Favorite Architecture". On April 18, 2012, the AIA's Florida Chapter ranked the Fontainebleau first on its list of "Florida Architecture: 100 Years. 100 Places".

The Fontainebleau Miami Beach is located on Collins Avenue and is owned by the Soffer family-controlled Fontainebleau Resorts.

== History ==
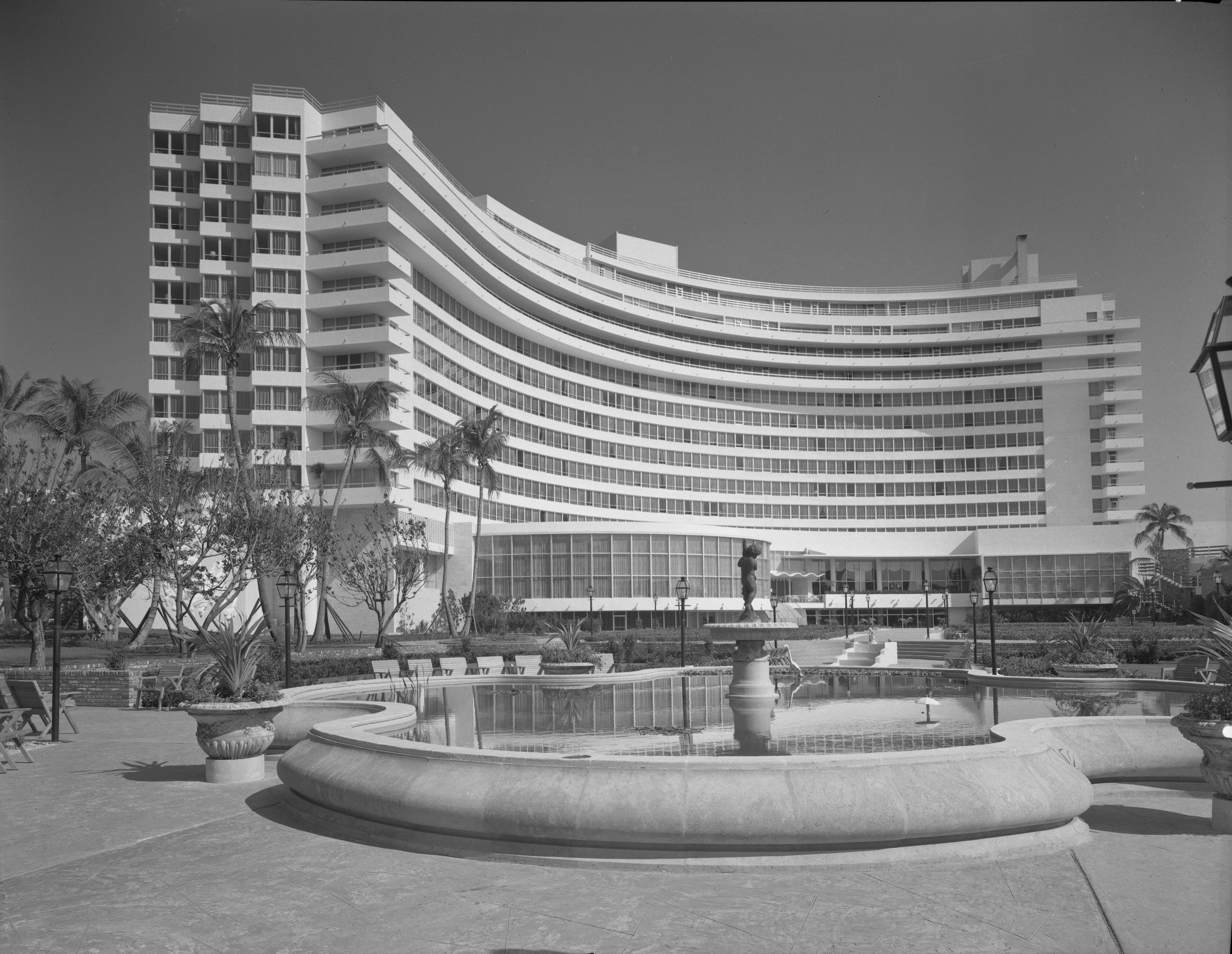
Fontainebleau Hotel in March 1955, photographed by Samuel Gottscho

The hotel in 1982 at sunset

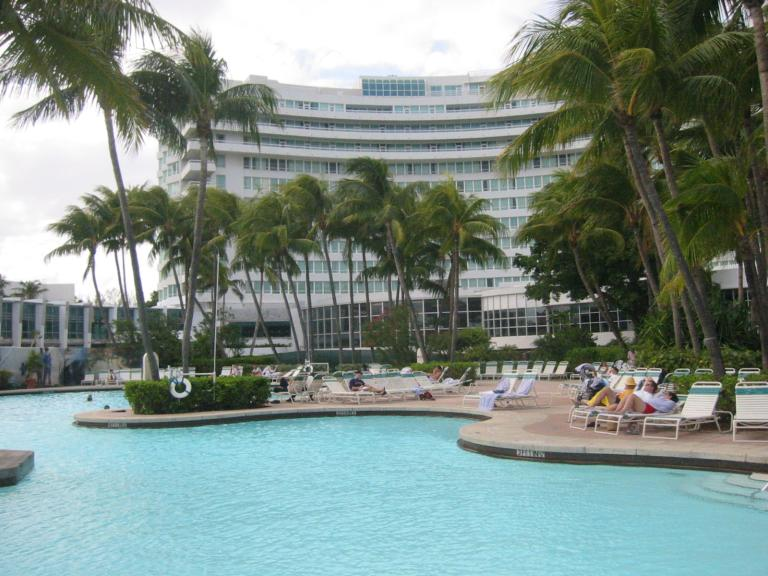
Fontainebleau Hotel in 2004

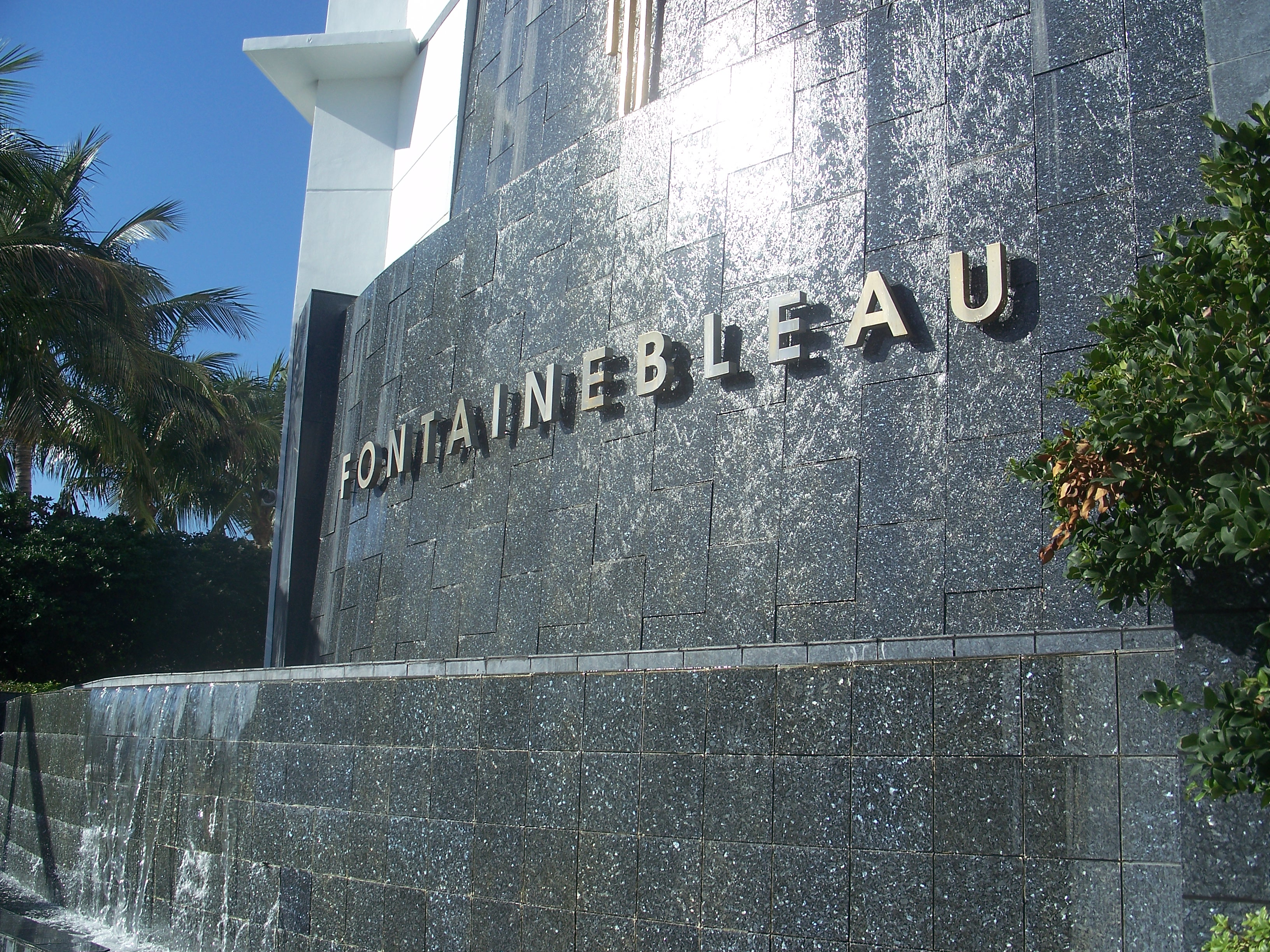
Fountain

=== 20th century ===
The hotel was built by hotelier Ben Novack on the grounds of the former Harvey Firestone estate. Novack owned and operated the hotel until its bankruptcy in 1977. The Fontainebleau was designed by Morris Lapidus, who was known for wearing bow ties and incorporated them into the design.

The Fontainebleau is noted for its victory in the landmark 1959 Florida District Courts of Appeal decision, Fontainebleau Hotel Corp. v. Forty-Five Twenty-Five, Inc. 114 So. 2d 357, in which the Fontainebleau Hotel successfully appealed an injunction by the neighboring Eden Roc Hotel to prevent construction of an expansion that blocked sunlight to the Eden Roc's swimming pool. The court rejected the Eden Roc's claim to an easement allowing sunlight, in favor of affirming the Fontainebleau's vertical property rights to build on its land. It stated that the "ancient lights" doctrine had been unanimously repudiated in the United States.

In the 1970s, a suite in the hotel was used by members of the Black Tuna Gang to run their operations. The gang's use of the hotel is recounted in the 2011 documentary Square Grouper. The film follows the burgeoning marijuana-smuggling trade of the mid-to-late 1970s, when large amounts of the drug were being shipped to southeastern Florida; the film alleges that more than 90 percent of the United States' illicit demand was being met through such channels.

In 1978, Stephen Muss bought the Fontainebleau Hotel for $27 million, thus rescuing it from bankruptcy.

=== 21st century ===
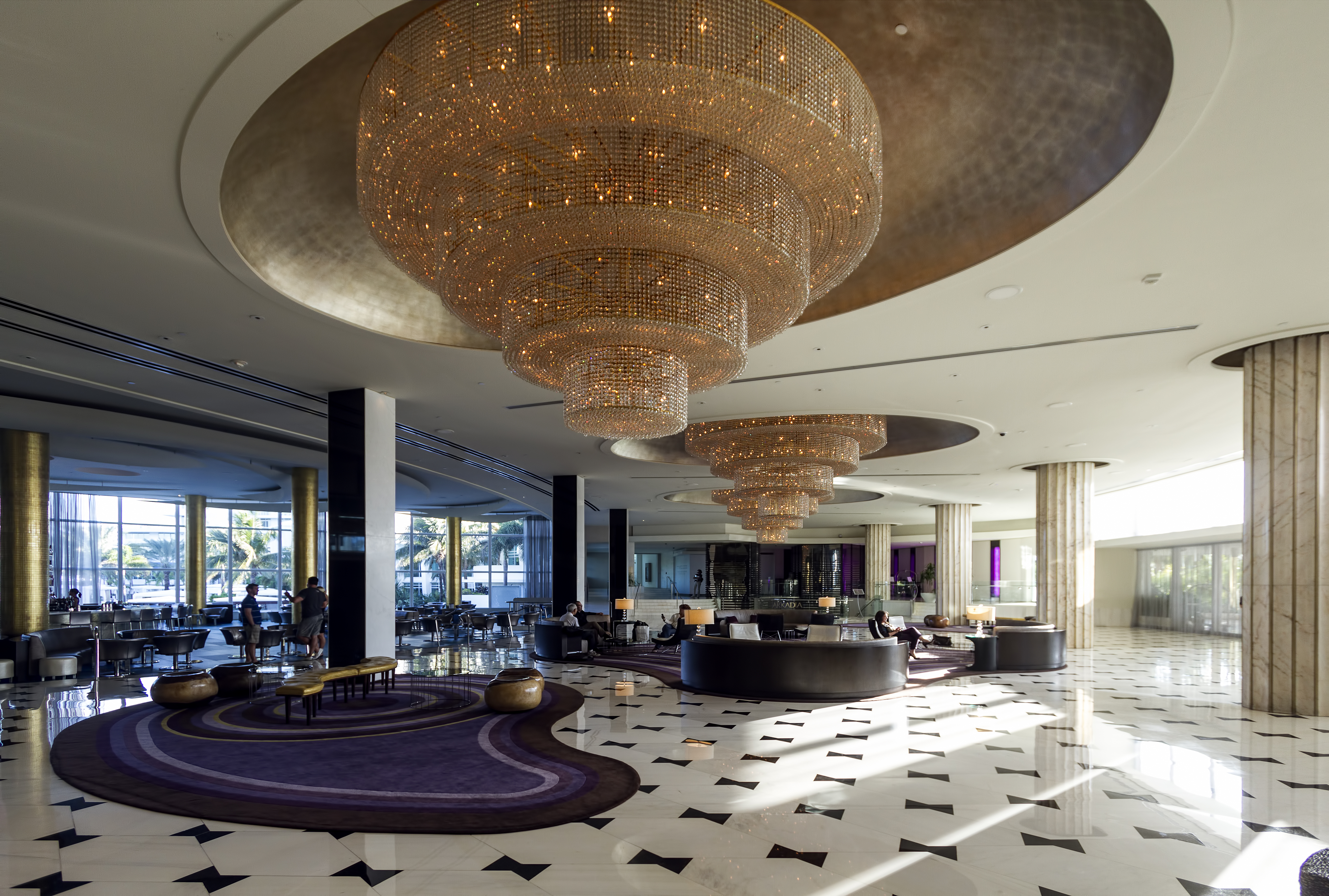
The lobby at the Fountainebleau Miami Beach

Muss invested an additional $100 million into the hotel for improvements. In 2001, the Muss Organization announced a partnership with Turnberry Associates to what amounted to a billion-dollar renovation of the hotel.

In 2002, the hotel was renovated and expanded by John Nichols, an architect with the Coral Gables-based Nichols Architects. The renovations and expansion included the addition of a 36-story condominium-hotel, known as Fontainebleau II, and a second 18-story tower, known as Fontainebleau III, all located on the same premises as the original hotel. During the renovation, Morris Lapidus's exuberant aesthetic and stylistic choices were preserved.

In 2005, after 30 years of being managed by Hilton Worldwide, the hotel became self-managed. The same year, the Muss Organization sold the Fontainebleau to Turnberry Associates for $165 million.

In 2006, the hotel closed a large part of the property, though one building remained open to hotel guests, and the furnishings were placed for sale. The expanded hotel and its new condominium buildings reopened in November 2008.

Fontainebleau's grand reopening on November 18, 2008 marked the end of a $1 billion transformation. Special care was taken to preserve many of the original design elements, including the "Staircase to Nowhere", also known as the "floating staircase". The reopening celebration included hosting the annual Victoria's Secret fashion show.

On December 22, 2008, the Fontainebleau was added to the National Register of Historic Places.

Restaurants and nightclubs in the complex include:

- Arkadia Grill
- Blade Sushi
- Bleau Bar
- Chez Bon Bon (coffee and patisserie)
- Fresh (snacks and gelato)
- Glow Bar
- Hakkasan (Cantonese)
- La Côte (bi-level poolside bar and grille)
- Le Rond Food Truck
- LIV Miami
- Mirabella (Coastal Italian)
- Prime 54 (Modern Steakhouse)
- Vida (New American)

== Appearances in media ==
The Fontainebleau is a prominent feature in contemporary culture, appearing in numerous movies and television shows, musical lyrics, and nationally televised sporting and other events, including:

=== 1950s ===
- The swimming pool is shown in the 1959 film A Hole in the Head. Tony Manetta (played by Frank Sinatra) attends a party there for businessman and friend Jerry Marks (played by Keenan Wynn). Miami Mayor Robert King High had a cameo during the gala scene.

=== 1960s ===
- The Fontainebleau is featured in the 1964 James Bond film Goldfinger, in the sweeping aerial shot that follows the opening credits and accompanies composer John Barry's big-band track "Into Miami". It is the hotel where Jill Masterson (played by Shirley Eaton) is murdered by the titular villain's henchman Oddjob (played by Harold Sakata).
- The hotel is repeatedly mentioned by Allan Sherman in his 1962 comedy song, "The Streets of Miami".
- The Fontainebleau is depicted in the 1960–1962 television series Surfside 6 about two detectives living and working aboard a houseboat moored directly across the street from the hotel. Supporting character Cha Cha O'Brien was an entertainer who worked at The Boom Boom Room in the hotel. Only establishing shots of the hotel were used; the series was filmed entirely at Warner Bros. studios in Burbank, California.
- In March 1960, Frank Sinatra videotaped an ABC television special at the hotel, The Frank Sinatra Timex Show: Welcome Home Elvis, as part of his regular Timex-sponsored series to welcome back Elvis Presley following his two-year military service in West Germany. Broadcast on May 12, 1960, Nielsen reported a 41.5% rating and 67.7% share, with an audience at 50 million, making it the top-rated show of the year and Sinatra's top-rated television appearance of his 21-year career (1960–1981).
- The hotel was the setting for Jerry Lewis's 1960 comedy film, The Bellboy.

=== 1970s ===
- On January 29, 1977, boxer Roberto Durán retained his WBA world Lightweight title with a 13th-round knockout over Vilomar Fernandez in a bout that was televised live by CBS from the hotel.
- The Fontainebleau is the title subject of a song written by Neil Young and performed by the Stills-Young Band on their 1976 album Long May You Run, which was recorded at the hotel.

=== 1980s ===
- The Fontainebleau is one of the primary settings for the 1988 comedy sequel Police Academy 5: Assignment Miami Beach with the film's characters staying there during the movie and many of the film's scenes filmed there.
- The Fontainebleau acts as the unmentioned location for a widely popular scene in 1983's Scarface where Manny, played by Steven Bauer, gets slapped in the face after trying to win over a girl by sticking out his tongue to her.

=== 1990s ===
- The Fontainebleau is featured in the 1992 film The Bodyguard starring Whitney Houston. Also in 1992, the hotel appears in final scene of The Specialist, an action film starring Sylvester Stallone and Sharon Stone.

=== 21st century ===
- In 2019, the Fontainebleau appears in the third season of the Amazon TV series The Marvelous Mrs. Maisel in a scene in which Midge Maisel (played by Rachel Brosnahan) and Susie Myerson (played by Alex Borstein) stay at the resort while on tour with Shy Baldwin. In one scene, Midge is shown descending the grand staircase in the ornate lobby.
- Also in 2019, the Fontainebleau, billed as the Riviera Grand Hotel, was the setting for the pilot of the Grand Hotel TV series pilot. After the pilot was filmed and ABC picked up a full order of episodes, the cast and crew headed to Los Angeles, where a mini-replica of the Fontainebleau was constructed. The exterior shots shown throughout the season are actually the real Fontainebleau.
- The Fontainebleau appears in the Season 4 episode of The Sopranos titled "Calling All Cars", which first aired on November 24, 2002.

== Pronunciation ==
The local pronunciation of the hotel's name is the Anglicized "fountain blue" rather than the normal French pronunciation of the word as Fontenn-blow.

== See also ==
- Fontainebleau Las Vegas, sister property
