= Aventura, Florida =

The City of Aventura
- City
- City of Aventura
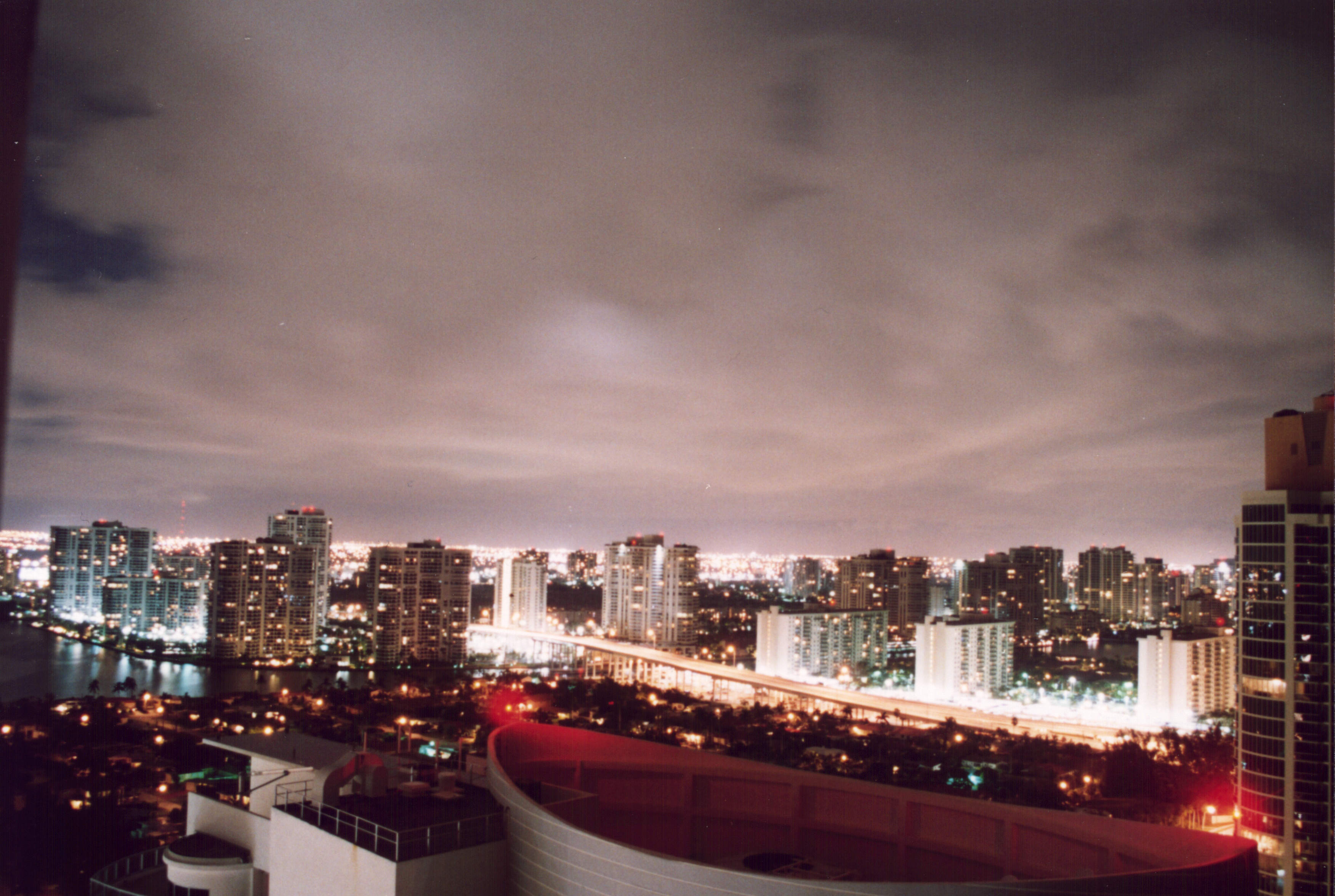
- Aventura, Florida, October 2006

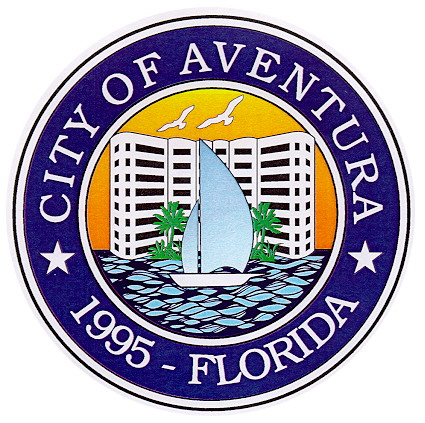
- Flag Seal
- Motto: "The City of Excellence."
- Interactive map of The City of Aventura
- Coordinates: 25°57′42″N 80°07′48″W
- Country: United States
- State: Florida
- County: Miami-Dade
- Incorporated: November 7, 1995

Government
  - Type: Council-Manager

Area
  - Total: 3.52 sq mi (9.11 km^{2})
  - Land: 2.65 sq mi (6.86 km^{2})
  - Water: 0.87 sq mi (2.25 km^{2})
- Elevation: 7 ft (2.1 m)

Population (2020)
  - Total: 40,242
  - Density: 15,196.1/sq mi (5,867.26/km^{2})
- Time zone: UTC−5 (EST)
  - Summer (DST): UTC−4 (EDT)
- ZIP Codes: 33180, 33160
- Area codes: 305, 786, 645
- FIPS code: 12-02681
- GNIS feature ID: 2403141
- Website: www.cityofaventura.com

Aventura is a planned suburban city in northeastern Miami-Dade County, Florida, United States, 15 miles (24 km) north of Miami and part of the Miami metropolitan area. The city is especially known for Aventura Mall, the fifth largest mall in the United States by total square feet of retail space and the largest mall in Florida.

The city name is from the Spanish word for "adventure", and was named "Aventura" after the developers of the original group of condominiums in the area, Eddie Lewis and Don Soffer, who had remarked "What an adventure this is going to be."

As of the 2020 census, the city population was 40,242, up from 35,762 in 2010.

== History ==
Initially referred to as "Turnberry", Aventura began to be developed during the early 1970s and became an incorporated city in 1995. The Aventura Police Department was formed in 1997.

The city is home to the luxury resort JW Marriott Miami Turnberry Resort & Spa, where the yacht Monkey Business was docked during the Gary Hart/Donna Rice incident, which contributed to Hart's ending his 1988 bid for the presidency.

Aventura is also home to the Aventura Mall, the fifth-largest shopping mall in the US. Built in 1983, it is a joint venture of Turnberry Associates and Simon Property, and brings a major source of income to the city.

In early 2001, former US President Bill Clinton delivered one of his first speeches after leaving the White House at Aventura-Turnberry Jewish Center.

== Government ==
The City of Aventura utilizes a Council-Manager system of government, with a single Mayor and six Commissioners which all comprise the City Commission. The following Officials hold seats in the current City Commission:

- Howard S. Weinberg, Esq. – Mayor
- Gustavo Blachman – Commissioner, Seat 1
- Cindy Orlinsky – Commissioner, Seat 2
- Clifford B. Ain – Vice Mayor & Commissioner, Seat 3
- Paul A. Kruss – Commissioner, Seat 4
- Rachel S. Friedland, Esq. – Commissioner, Seat 5
- Amit Bloom – Commissioner, Seat 6

== Geography and climate ==
=== Geography ===
Aventura is in northeastern Miami–Dade County. It is bordered to the east by Golden Beach and Sunny Isles Beach, to the south by North Miami Beach, and to the west by unincorporated Ojus. It is bordered to the north by Hallandale Beach in Broward County. U.S. Route 1 (Biscayne Boulevard) runs along the western edge of the city, leading south 15 miles (24 km) to Downtown Miami and north 12 miles (19 km) to Fort Lauderdale.

According to the United States Census Bureau, the city has an area of 3.5 square miles (9.1 km^{2}). Of that, 2.6 sq mi (6.7 km^{2}) are land and 0.9 sq mi (2.3 km^{2}) (24.73%) are water. The Atlantic Intracoastal Waterway and Dumfoundling Bay form the eastern border of the city, while the southern border is within Maule Lake.

==== Surrounding areas ====
Hallandale Beach
Hallandale Beach Hallandale Beach
Ojus Golden Beach, Sunny Isles Beach
North Miami Beach Sunny Isles Beach
North Miami Beach

=== Climate ===
Aventura has a tropical monsoon climate (Köppen climate classification Am) with hot and humid summers and short, warm winters, with a marked drier season in the winter. The city sees most of its rain in the summer (wet season) and is mainly dry in winter (dry season). The wet season, which is hot and humid, lasts from May to September, when it gives way to the dry season, which features mild temperatures with some invasions of colder air, which is when the little winter rainfall occurs-with the passing of a front. The hurricane season largely coincides with the wet season.

In addition to its sea-level elevation, coastal location and position just north of the Tropic of Cancer, the area owes its warm, humid climate to the Gulf Stream, which moderates climate year-round. A typical summer day does not see temperatures below 75 °F (24 °C). Temperatures in the high 80s to low 90s (30–35 °C) accompanied by high humidity are often relieved by afternoon thunderstorms or a sea breeze that develops off the Atlantic Ocean, which then allow lower temperatures, although conditions still remain very muggy. During winter, humidity is significantly lower, allowing for cooler weather to develop. Average minimum temperatures during that time are around 59 °F (15 °C), rarely dipping below 40 °F (4 °C), and the equivalent maxima usually around 75 °F (24 °C).

Hurricane season begins June 1 and is officially over November 30. Aventura was severely hit by Hurricane Wilma on October 24, 2005, and was still undergoing recovery as of November 2011. The library was destroyed and has been rebuilt. Terraces flew off of high-rises and condos on high floors were flooded with many of their walls exploding into next-door apartments and adjacent hallways. Countless high-rise windows exploded and electricity stopped.

== Demographics ==
Historical population
Census	Pop.	Note	%±
1980	9,698		—
1990	14,914		53.8%
2000	25,267		69.4%
2010	35,762		41.5%
2020	40,242		12.5%

=== Racial and ethnic composition ===
Aventura racial composition (Hispanics excluded from racial categories) (NH = Non-Hispanic)
Race	Pop 2010	Pop 2020	% 2010	% 2020
White (NH)	20,711	19,899	57.91%	49.45%
Black or African American (NH)	1,211	1,101	3.39%	2.74%
Native American or Alaska Native (NH)	31	21	0.09%	0.05%
Asian (NH)	619	828	1.73%	2.06%
Pacific Islander or Native Hawaiian (NH)	6	8	0.02%	0.02%
Some other race (NH)	85	324	0.24%	0.81%
Two or more races/Multiracial (NH)	301	1,836	0.84%	4.56%
Hispanic or Latino (any race)	12,798	16,225	35.79%	40.32%
Total	35,762	40,242		

=== 2020 census ===
As of the 2020 census, Aventura had a population of 40,242. The median age was 48.4 years. 17.1% of residents were under the age of 18 and 28.3% of residents were 65 years of age or older. For every 100 females there were 85.1 males, and for every 100 females age 18 and over there were 82.0 males age 18 and over.

100.0% of residents lived in urban areas, while 0.0% lived in rural areas.

There were 18,861 households in Aventura, of which 22.9% had children under the age of 18 living in them. Of all households, 44.0% were married-couple households, 18.2% were households with a male householder and no spouse or partner present, and 33.1% were households with a female householder and no spouse or partner present. About 35.7% of all households were made up of individuals and 19.0% had someone living alone who was 65 years of age or older.

There were 26,469 housing units, of which 28.7% were vacant. The homeowner vacancy rate was 2.6% and the rental vacancy rate was 10.6%.

=== 2010 census ===
As of the 2010 United States census, there were 35,762 people, 16,795 households, and 8,980 families residing in the city.

=== 2000 census ===
As of 2000, 11.3% had children under the age of 18 living with them, 39.6% were married couples living together, 6.2% had a female householder with no husband present, and 52.2% were non-families. 45.3% of all households were made up of individuals, and 23.2% had someone living alone who was 65 years of age or older. The average household size was 1.79 and the average family size was 2.45.

In 2000, the city population was spread out, with 10.1% under the age of 18, 4.6% from 18 to 24, 26.5% from 25 to 44, 23.6% from 45 to 64, and 35.2% who were 65 years of age or older. The median age was 53 years. For every 100 females, there were 80.2 males. For every 100 females age 18 and over, there were 77.9 males.

As of 2000, the median income for a household in the city was $44,526, and the median income for a family was $59,507. Males had a median income of $50,791 versus $37,682 for females. The per capita income for the city was $41,092. About 5.6% of families and 9.1% of the population were below the poverty line, including 8.5% of those under age 18 and 8.5% of those age 65 or over.

=== Language and culture ===
As of 2000, speakers of English as their first language accounted for 59.92% of the population, while Spanish accounted for 22.63% of residents. Due to its large Jewish population, Hebrew and Yiddish speakers were respectively 3.66% and 2.78% of the population. Other languages spoken include Portuguese 2.65%, French 2.40%, Russian 1.75%, and German at 1.46% of city residents.

== Transportation ==
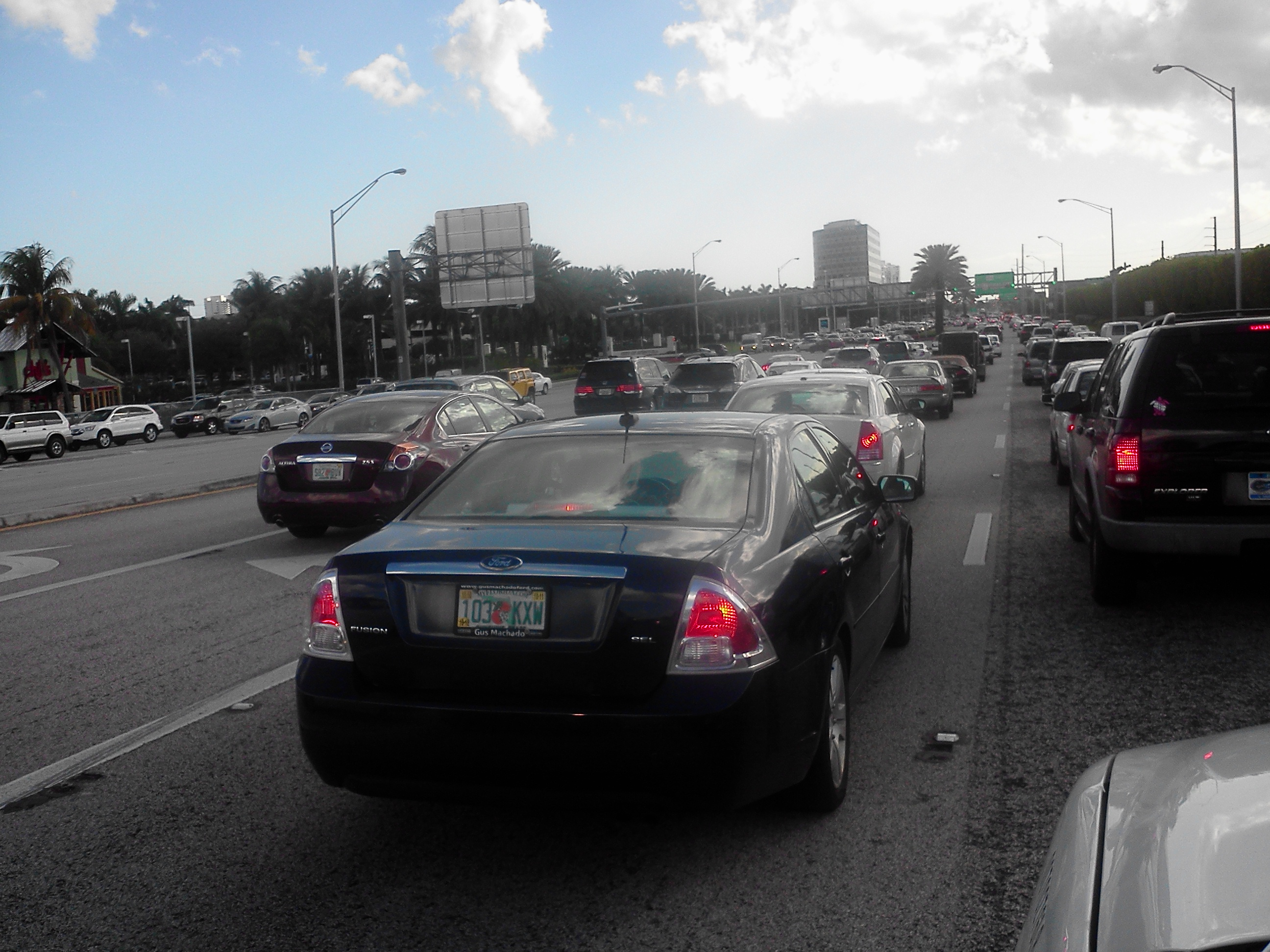
Early afternoon congestion in Aventura on Biscayne Boulevard (US 1)

Aventura's partnership with Freebee offers free, on-demand, electric ride-sharing for anyone who wants to get around the city. The service runs from 7:00 AM to 11:00 PM everyday except Thanksgiving, Christmas, and New Years Day.

The Aventura Express shuttle bus is a city-run public bus service, free to anyone in Aventura. The service runs three routes (North, Central, and South). Miami-Dade Transit's Metrobus and Broward County Transit bus systems also run through the city. Metrobus provide connections to Metrorail and Metromover at Government Center via Biscayne Boulevard/US 1. Over the last 30 years, travel infrastructure in Aventura has been heavily funded and influenced by developers of the many highrise condominium projects near the beach. Efforts to mitigate traffic impacts associated with increased travel demand to and from these projects led to the majority of principal road, bridge and structure designed primarily to accommodate automobile travel. This, coupled with single-use zoning and a general lack of connectivity for pedestrians, cyclists and similar modes has contributed to heavy traffic congestion on and near Biscayne Boulevard (US 1), despite this highway having up to ten travel lanes at points. Moreover, costly road improvements have not effectively mitigated traffic increases. A grade separation at the intersection of Ives Dairy Road and Biscayne Boulevard was constructed to facilitate westbound travel leading to Interstate 95 and free flowing eastbound right turns, but traffic signal phasing of the remaining approaches was unchanged, and the intersection continued to experience regular long queues.

The main north–south road in the city is Biscayne Boulevard (US 1), and the main east–west route is the William H. Lehman Causeway. Although no interstates run through the city, I-95 is 1 mile (1.6 km) to the west, with access from Exit 16 (Ives Dairy Road).

Brightline is an inter-city rail service operating between Miami and Orlando. The Aventura station, adjacent to the Aventura Mall, provides service along the route.

Tri-Rail commuter rail service has also been proposed to run on the FEC line. Another proposal would extend the Miami Metrorail along the US 1 corridor from Downtown Miami to the Broward County line, which would pass through Aventura and Hallandale Beach.

== Area attractions ==
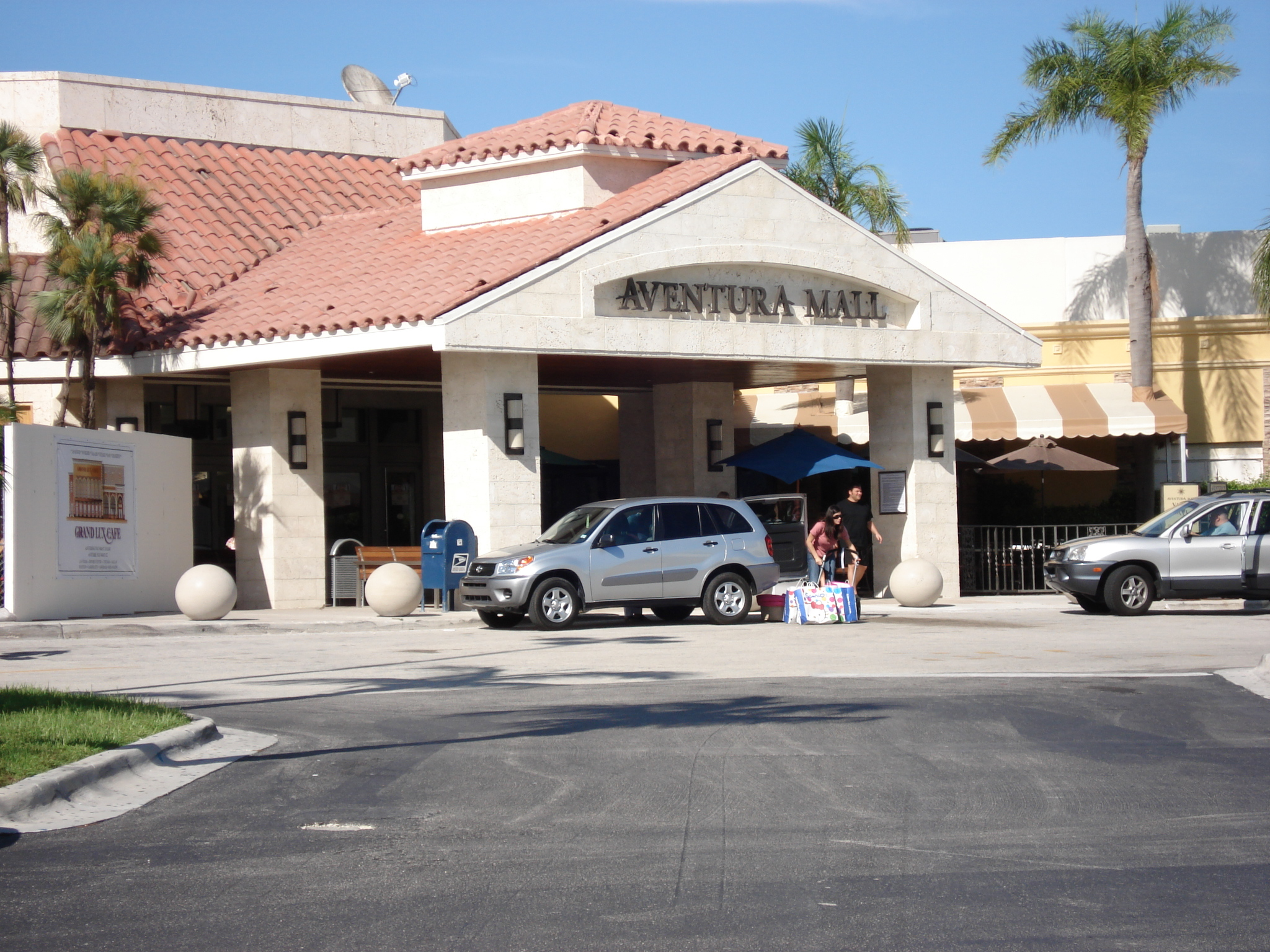
The Aventura Mall, the city's largest attraction and source of revenue

The most famous shopping attraction is Aventura Mall, a 2,700,000 sq ft (250,838 m^{2}) indoor shopping center. The outdoor malls are "Aventura Town Center", "Aventura Shopping Center", "Aventura Commons", "The Promenade Shops", and "The Shoppes at the Waterways".

The city also has its own exclusive parks and recreation department which operate Founders Park, Founders Park Bayside, Waterways Park, Waterways Dog Park, Veterans Park, The Community Recreation Center, and the Aventura Arts and Cultural Center (AACC).

At the geographical center of Aventura is the Turnberry Golf Course, encircled by Aventura's Country Club Drive. The Turnberry Golf Course is a three-mile walking/jogging paved promenade which overlooks a multi million-dollar horticultural exhibit, lakes, opulent residential high rises, yachts and the Atlantic Ocean.

== Education ==
Aventura is served by the Miami-Dade County Public Schools (MDCPS) system. Aventura Waterways K–8 Center serves as the public K–8 school of MDCPS which serves Aventura. The school is outside of the city limits but all children that live in Aventura are in the boundary for that school. Dr. Michael Krop High School in Ives Estates is currently the sole MDCPS high school serving North Miami-Dade County residents, including those of Aventura. Krop is considered to be a magnet school because it has a "Students Training in the Arts Repertory (STAR)" program, and has a total student body population of 2,833.

There are also charter schools established with sponsorship from the municipal government, Aventura City of Excellence School (ACES), a K–8 school. It was for years the only public school within the City of Aventura. It is operated by a private charter school company called Charter Schools USA. Built and opened in 2003, ACES was ranked in the top 10 of all schools in Florida in 2006. Construction on the Don Soffer Aventura High School, the other charter school, began in 2018. Opened in August 2019, the Charter School initially accepted ninth grade students in its first year and added grades 10 through 12 in subsequent years.

The Northeast Branch of the Miami-Dade Public Library System serves Aventura as a means of accessing information for all education alike.

Regional universities and higher education institutions include:

- Florida International University: Biscayne Bay Campus (North Miami)

== Media ==
Aventura News is Aventura's own newspaper, which is published weekly and is part of the Miami Community Newspapers, The Voice of the Community. Aventura is served by the Miami–Ft. Lauderdale market for local radio and television. The city has a magazine named Aventura Magazine and is served by The Miami Herald and El Nuevo Herald.

In 2022, Aventura became the first city in Florida to offer the opportunity for the public to text its city government. The city monitors the text messages and responds to questions and concerns.

== Notable people ==
- Lucille Ball, actress best known for the television series I Love Lucy
- Bobbi Kristina Brown, American reality television personality, singer and actress, daughter of singers Whitney Houston and Bobby Brown
- Bobby Brown, American singer, songwriter, dancer, and actor, husband of Whitney Houston
- James Caan, actor
- Edgar F. Codd, computer scientist
- Jimmy Connors, tennis player
- Caroline, Princess of Hanover, hereditary Princess of Monaco
- Jim Courier, American tennis player
- Billy Cunningham, NBA basketball player and coach
- Morton Downey Jr., singer, songwriter, and television talk show host of The Morton Downey Jr. Show
- Vitas Gerulaitis, Lithuanian-American professional tennis player
- Whitney Houston, singer and actress
- Jimmy Johnson, NFL football coach for Dallas Cowboys and later the Miami Dolphins, former Dallas Cowboys two-time Super Bowl champion
- Alan King, actor and comedian
- Sophia Loren, Italian actress
- Sid Luckman, Pro Football Hall of Fame player
- John McEnroe, tennis player
- Howard Metzenbaum, U.S. senator representing Ohio in 1974, and again from 1977-1995
- Carlo Ponti, Italian film producer
- Carlo Ponti Jr., Italian orchestral conductor, son of Carlo Ponti
- Edoardo Ponti, Italian director, son of Carlo Ponti
- Sid Raymond, actor and comedian
- Dennis Rodman, Basketball Hall of Fame, five-time NBA world champion, and two-time NBA All-Star
- Jeffrey Rosen, billionaire businessman
- Donald Soffer, real estate developer
- Fred Stolle, Australian tennis player, two-time major winner
- Sandon Stolle, Australian tennis player
- Frankie Valli, pop singer
- Alain Vigneault, head coach for the NHL Philadelphia Flyers
