= Aventura Mall =

Shopping mall in Aventura, Florida, U.S.

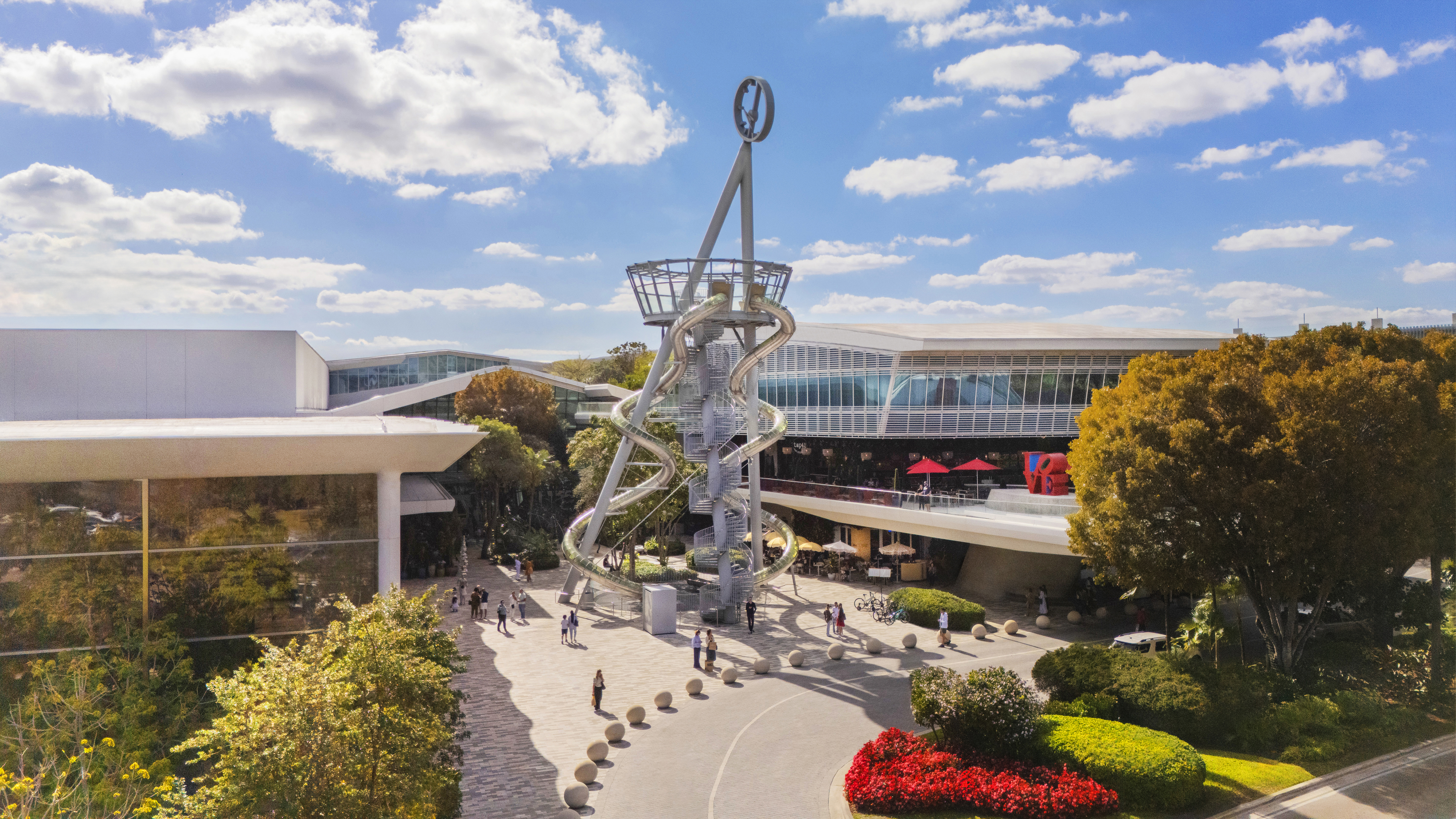
- Exterior shot of Aventura Mall, May 2026
- Location: Aventura, Florida, United States
- Coordinates: 25°57′29″N 80°08′35″W
- Address: 19501 Biscayne Boulevard
- Opened: April 29, 1983; 43 years ago
- Developer: Oxford Development Co. and Edward J. DeBartolo Corp.
- Manager: Turnberry Associates
- Owner: Turnberry Associates; Simon Property Group (33.3%)
- Num. of stores: 300+
- Num. of anchor tenants: 5
- Floor area: 2,800,000 square feet (260,000 m^{2})
- Floors: 2 with partial third floors (3 in both Macy's locations, Bloomingdale's, Treats Food Hall, 4 in the Nordstrom parking garage, 6 in the Macy's Men and Bloomingdale's parking garages as well as the 2017 wing parking garage, 7 in the Macy's women garage)
- Parking: 9,800
- Website: aventuramall.com

Aventura Mall is a super-regional shopping mall located in Aventura, Florida. It is the fifth-largest mall in the United States by total square feet of retail space. The mall spans 2.7 million square feet, with 1.9 million square feet of retail space, and is the largest mall in the Miami metropolitan area and in Florida. The mall attracts 25 to 32 million visitors per year. The mall features JCPenney, Macy's, Nordstrom, and Bloomingdale's, in addition to a 24-screen AMC Theatres.

Aventura Mall has more than 300 stores, including industry firsts, and over 50 dining venues including Treats Food Hall. The mall is also home to the Arts Aventura Mall program, which features a collection of more than 25 museum-quality contemporary art installations and sculptures displayed throughout the property.

The Brightline Aventura Station is located across Biscayne Boulevard from the mall.

In 2025, Aventura Mall's owners, Turnberry and Simon Property Group, acquired the adjacent Esplanade at Aventura and rebranded the property as The Abbey at Aventura. The 219,000-square-foot, open-air, mixed-use development features retail, dining, fitness and wellness, and office space.

== History ==
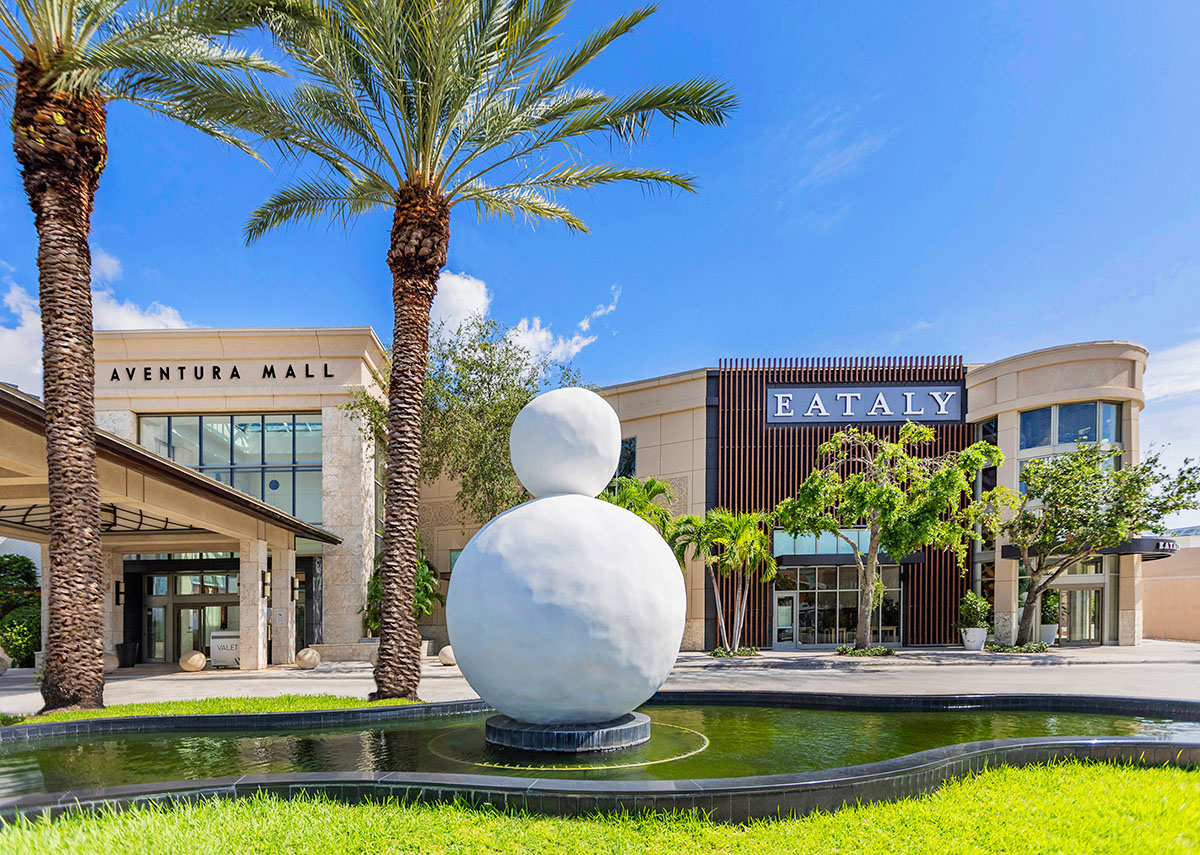
Eataly and Aventura Mall entrances

In April 1983, the Oxford Development Company, led by partners Donald Soffer, Edward J. Lewis, Mark E. Mason, Eugene Lebowitz, and Ray Parello officially dedicated Aventura Mall. There would be four anchors in the original, 1.2-million-square-foot (110,000 m^{2}), complex: Lord & Taylor, JCPenney, Sears (opened July 6, 1983, three weeks after another at Miami International Mall), and Macy's (first Florida store opened October 1, 1983).

On board as an original investor in the project was mall developer Edward J. DeBartolo Sr.

Soon after its construction, Soffer left Oxford Development Company. As part of the breakup of assets, Soffer's new firm, Turnberry Associates, assumed control of the Aventura Mall. In 1996, the DeBartolo Realty Corporation, which owned the minority interest once held by Edward J. DeBartolo, was acquired by Simon Property Group.

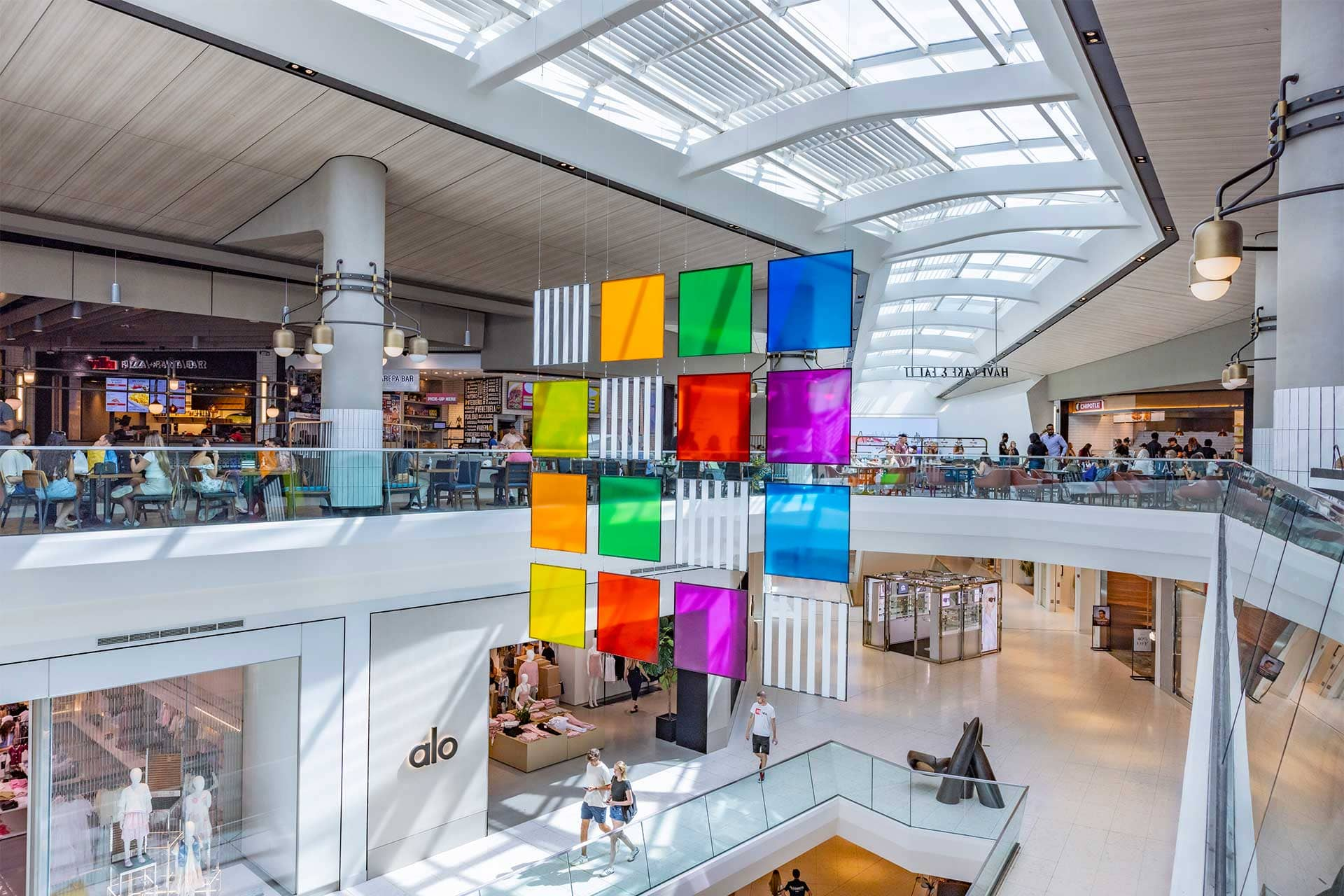
Interior first and second floors of Aventura Mall

In 1996, the ground was broken for an expansion of Aventura Mall that included a three-story atrium, a multiplex cinema, and restaurants.

The mall continued to expand, with additions in November 1997 and August 1999, including Burdines (1999–2004) before becoming Burdines-Macy's (2004–2005). The mall underwent renovations and expansions from 2006 to 2008. The mall expanded again in 2017 by opening a new three-level, 315,000-square-foot (29,300 m^{2}) expansion wing.

By 2023, after the government lockdown, Aventura Mall had announced several new additions, among them are Mango, Dr. Martens, Vuori, Garage, Aesop, Hermès, Armani Exchange, BVLGARI, and Valentino.

In 2025 and 2026, Aventura Mall was named Best Mall in the United States in USA Today's 10Best Readers' Choice Awards.

In 2026, Aventura Mall continued to expand its retail and dining offerings. The expansion followed the opening of new Prada and Dior boutiques in 2025. It included several first-to-market concepts, such as Eataly's first Florida location, Amouage's first standalone Florida boutique, and Bershka's first location in the United States. Other new stores include UNIQLO, Revolve (first east coast location), On, BYLT, and Wilson.

== Retail ==
Aventura Mall contains more than 300 stores and is one of the largest shopping centers in the United States. Its tenant mix includes luxury fashion houses, department stores, specialty retailers, and flagship locations. The mall is anchored by Nordstrom, Bloomingdale's, Macy's, JCPenney, and AMC Theatres.

Aventura Mall includes a three-level Apple Store designed by Foster + Partners. The store opened as part of a mall expansion and features an indoor-outdoor layout, an amphitheater, and a landscaped “Genius Grove” area.

In the 2020s, the mall added several retail tenants that represented regional, national, or international first or early locations, including UNIQLO, Bershka (first U.S. location), Amouage (first standalone Florida location), On, BYLT, Wilson, Aritzia, Massimo Dutti (first Florida location in 2024), Skims, Rivian, Cinq à Sept (first Florida store), Missoni, and Dolce Vita (first Florida store).

=== Dining ===
Aventura Mall features more than 50 restaurants, cafés, and specialty food concepts. Dining venues are located throughout the property, including within Treats Food Hall, which features a collection of local and national fast-casual operators.

== Arts program ==
Arts Aventura Mall is a public art program established by Jackie Soffer and operated by Aventura Mall. The extensive world-class art collection features museum quality pieces and more than 25 contemporary artworks, sculptures, murals, and installations displayed throughout the property.

Artists represented in the collection include Louise Bourgeois, Robert Indiana, Carsten Höller, Daniel Arsham, Lawrence Weiner, Julian Opie, Ugo Rondinone, Wendell Castle, Austin Lee, Daniel Buren, and the Haas Brothers.

Among the collection's works are Aventura Slide Tower, a 93-foot-tall interactive sculpture by Carsten Höller, Rainbow Valley, an interactive playground created by the artist collective FriendsWithYou, and The Colored Screens by Daniel Buren.

== Community ==
Aventura Mall hosts community-focused programs and public events throughout the year, including cultural activations, seasonal celebrations, charitable initiatives, and family-oriented programming.

The mall has supported organizations including Achieve Miami, Best Buddies, Voices for Children Foundation, and the Humane Society of Greater Miami.

The mall is home to The Aventura Market, a recurring indoor farmers market featuring local vendors, artisans, specialty foods, and handcrafted goods. The market is held on weekends and is among the largest indoor farmers' markets in South Florida.

During the 2026 FIFA World Cup, the mall operated an official FIFA World Cup 2026 store, a match‑viewing lounge, and an installation titled the “48 Nation Jersey Experience” displaying the jerseys of all 48 participating national teams.

In 2025, the mall hosted events associated with the Miami Grand Prix including an activation with Boss and the Aston Martin Formula One team, Adidas, Audi, and Apple that included appearances by F1 driver Fernando Alonso and F1 Academy managing director Susie Wolff.

== See also ==
- List of shopping malls in the Miami metropolitan area
