= Turnberry Associates =

American real estate company

- Type: Privately held company
- Industry: Real estate development
- Founded: 1967; 59 years ago
- Founder: Donald Soffer
- Headquarters: Aventura, Florida
- Website: www.turnberry.com

Turnberry Associates is a real estate development and management company in the United States. The company has developed over $10 billion worth of properties during the course of its history. Current holdings in its portfolio include the Aventura Mall, the JW Marriott Nashville Marriott, and SoLé Mia. Jackie Soffer is chairman and chief executive officer. The company was founded in 1967 by Donald Soffer.

== History ==
In 1967, along with partner Edward J. Lewis of Oxford Development, Donald Soffer purchased 785 acres (3.18 km^{2}) of submerged and undeveloped swamp and marshland facing the Intracoastal Waterway in North Dade County. The company then acquired Aventura Club and changed its name to Turnberry Isle Resort & Club in 1970. Expansion and development continued in the City of Aventura throughout the 80s with the company opening Turnberry Yacht & Racquet Club and developing the Aventura Mall.

In the 1990s and early 2000s, the company developed Turnberry Place Las Vegas and undertook a large-scale renovation and development project transforming Fontainebleau Miami Beach, among other developments.

By 2014, the company announced plans to build a 35-story luxury JW Marriott hotel in Nashville.

The JW Marriott Nashville officially opened in 2018. The company broke ground on Turnberry Ocean Club Residences, a 154-unit, 650-foot luxury condominium tower in Miami in 2016 and broke ground on SoLé Mia, a mixed-use project on 154 acres in North Miami develop with LeFrak in 2015.

In 2017, the company announced plans for the expansion of Turnberry Isle Miami, including a re-branding into a JW Marriott property.

In 2018, the Aventura Mall opened its expansion wing and Jackie Soffer announced Turnberry would be developing a new 800-key Convention Center hotel in Miami Beach in partnership with David Martin’s Terra Group. The planned development was approved by voters that same year.

In 2019, after 25 years as partners, the Soffer siblings divided the company assets into two separate companies. Jackie Soffer is the current chairman and CEO of Turnberry Associates, the development firm launched 50 years ago by Donald Soffer. Turnberry is the principal owner of Aventura Mall, the Town Center Aventura, and three hotels in Aventura — Residence Inn by Marriott, Courtyard by Marriott and Hampton Inn — as well as another hotel in Orlando.

== Properties ==
- Turnberry Towers
- Turnberry Place
- Turnberry Ocean Club Residences
- Turnberry Isle Miami
- Aventura Mall
- The Signature at MGM Grand (50% joint venture with MGM Resorts International)
- Turnberry Isle Resort & Club
- Turnberry Yacht & Racquet Club
