= Krystle Sands =

- Interactive map of the Krystle Sands area

General information
- Status: Never built
- Type: Condo hotel
- Location: Winchester, Nevada, United States
- Coordinates: 36.136597°N 115.161416°W
- Cost: $400 million

Technical details
- Floor count: 45

Design and construction
- Architecture firm: JMA Architecture Studios
- Developer: F.W. "Freddie" Schinz
- Main contractor: Perini Building Company

Other information
- Number of units: 600

Krystle Sands was a proposed 45-story condo hotel that was to be built on the Las Vegas Strip in Winchester, Nevada. Reservations for the project's condominium units began in 2004, and construction was scheduled to start later that year, with the opening planned for 2006.

Krystle Sands would have replaced the Algiers Hotel, although the project was canceled in March 2005, when developer F.W. "Freddie" Schinz sold the property to Turnberry Associates. Several people who bought units in the project filed lawsuits against Schinz and Turnberry over the cancellation. The land later became the site of Turnberry's Fontainebleau resort.

== History ==
Krystle Sands was being planned by F.W. "Freddie" Schinz, a Florida developer. The project was to consist of a 45-story, 510-foot condo hotel. On April 1, 2004, reservations opened for condominium units on floors 4 to 38 of the tower. The Krystle Sands project was to replace the 105-room Algiers Hotel, located on a 3.6-acre site on the Las Vegas Strip, adjacent to the Turnberry Place complex and to the former site of the El Rancho Hotel and Casino. At the time of the announcement, 70 percent of the project's 600 units had been reserved.

Most units would range from 852 sq ft (79.2 m^{2}) to 1,329 sq ft (123.5 m^{2}), with prices from $400,000 to more than $700,000. Although the tower was to be 45 stories high, it would skip the 13th floor. The tower's penthouses, starting at $1 million, would be located from floors 39 to 44, and would range from 2,400 sq ft (220 m^{2}) to more than 3,000 sq ft (280 m^{2}). Restaurants and retail were planned for the tower's first and second floors. The third floor was to consist of a recreation center and pool for condominium owners and renters. A rooftop restaurant was also planned. JMA Architecture Studios was the architect. Perini Building Company was to be the general contractor. Krystle Sands was to cost $400 million, and was to begin construction in October 2004, with an opening in summer 2006.

Schinz paid more than $26.2 million for the land, and closed on the deal in July 2004. The project was to be handled by Krystle Sands LLC, a limited liability company formed by Schinz in Florida. The company name was later changed to Krystle Towers LLC. In March 2005, Schinz sold Krystle Towers LLC and the property for $97 million to Turnberry Associates, which owned the Turnberry Place complex and the former land of the El Rancho. To avoid paying a real estate transfer tax, Turnberry purchased the Krystle Sands project in addition to the property on which it was to be built. Turnberry announced the cancellation of Krystle Sands to buyers in a letter on March 25, 2005, stating that it was unable to receive construction financing to build the project. A condominium boom was underway in Las Vegas at the time, and Krystle Sands was the first of the newly proposed projects to be canceled.

Shortly after the cancellation was announced, some buyers of the project's condominium units filed five lawsuits against Schinz, Krystle Sands LLC, Krystle Towers LLC, and Fidelity National Title Agency of Nevada. One lawsuit sought class-action status. Each lawsuit alleged that Schinz never planned to build the tower and was in the process of seeking a buyer for the property while selling the project's 600 units, in an alleged attempt to make what would ultimately become a $70 million profit. Other claims in the lawsuits included allegations of fraud, deceptive trade practices and civil conspiracy. Plaintiffs sought at least $70 million in damages, as well as the return of escrow money to the buyers. One lawsuit alleged that Turnberry had made false statements regarding its reason for cancelling Krystle Sands, noting that four days earlier, Turnberry had announced that it received construction financing for a separate 636-unit tower at its Turnberry Place complex.

A class action lawsuit consisting of 150 buyers was underway by June 2006, alleging that Turnberry had an obligation to provide condominium units to buyers who signed purchase and sale agreements and placed 10 percent of the purchase price in escrow. Turnberry stated that all deposits made on Krystle Sands units had been returned and that the company had no intention of building the project. A lawyer representing the buyer group alleged that Turnberry lied to buyers about being unable to obtain construction financing for Krystle Sands as part of an attempt to build its Fontainebleau resort on the property: "They had to figure a way to lie to buyers and not tell the truth that they're going to jettison the project to build Fountainbleu [sic]." The case was expected to go to trial in March 2007.
