= Algiers Hotel =

- Interactive map of the Algiers Hotel area

General information
- Status: Demolished
- Type: Hotel
- Location: 2845 South Las Vegas Boulevard, Winchester, Nevada, United States
- Coordinates: 36.136597°N 115.161416°W
- Opened: November 25, 1953
- Closed: August 31, 2004; 21 years ago

Technical details
- Floor count: 2

Other information
- Number of rooms: 110 (1953); 106 (2001)

The Algiers Hotel was an Arabian/Persian-themed hotel located at 2845 South Las Vegas Boulevard on the Las Vegas Strip in Winchester, Nevada. The Algiers opened on November 25, 1953, as a 110-room sister property to the adjacent Thunderbird hotel and casino. The Algiers was noted for mostly retaining its original design throughout its operation, giving it the appearance of an older Las Vegas hotel. In 1991, the property was earmarked for possible condemnation, allowing for the realignment of nearby streets in order to reduce traffic.

In 2001, owner Larry Kifer proposed swapping the Algiers property for a different parcel that the county planned to auction. Kifer stated that the potential road realignment project on the Algiers property had made it difficult to redevelop the land. Kifer dropped his proposal in late 2002, after the county decided not to realign the streets. In 2004, the property was sold to a developer who planned to demolish the Algiers and build the Krystle Sands condominium tower on the land. The Algiers closed on August 31, 2004, and was demolished, while the Krystle Sands project was cancelled in 2005. Two years later, Turnberry Associates began construction of the Fontainebleau Las Vegas resort on the former Algiers and Thunderbird properties.

== History ==
The Algiers opened on November 25, 1953. It was built by the Thunderbird hotel and casino (later the El Rancho), which was located at the northern end of the Las Vegas Strip. The 110-room Algiers was built as a sister property to deal with an overflow of guests at the adjacent Thunderbird. The hotel was built by Thunderbird developer Marion Hicks and his wife Lillian. The Algiers was constructed on 3.55 acres (1.44 ha), located on what would become the northeast corner of Riviera Boulevard and South Las Vegas Boulevard. The hotel was located directly north of the eventual site for the Riviera hotel-casino, and across the street from the eventual site of the Circus Circus hotel-casino.

Jack Walsh, the general manager for the Thunderbird during the late 1950s, became the Algiers' general manager in 1961. Walsh and his wife, Blanche, lived at the property from that point on. Marianne Kifer, the Hicks' daughter and the eventual owner of the Algiers, stated that her mother heavily relied on Walsh: "They were very, very good friends as well. She depended on him for everything -- his business advice and friendship."

City and state politicians regularly gathered at the Algiers for afternoon meetings. In the 1970s, Nevada governor Mike O'Callaghan stayed in a hotel room at the Algiers. Bulletproof glass was installed in O'Callaghan's room and was left in place afterwards. Paul Price, a former writer for the Las Vegas Sun, would also visit the hotel's bar to write his daily column. Las Vegas sheriff John Moran regularly ate lunch at the Algiers' restaurant during the 1980s. The Algiers would later become popular among sales people, senior citizens, and Europeans.

In 1991, the Algiers property was earmarked for possible condemnation to allow for the realignment of Riviera Boulevard with nearby Circus Circus Drive, thereby reducing traffic. Walsh remained as general manager until his death in July 1996, at the age of 81. Marrianne Kifer and her business partner, ex-husband Larry Kifer, had been in charge of operations at the Algiers for some time prior to Walsh's death, and planned to continue operating it. Up to 2001, the hotel had remained nearly unchanged, and had built a steady clientele consisting of the same customers. At the time, it was one of only several small hotels still operating on the Las Vegas Strip, where megaresorts had become common.

=== Property value and land swap proposal ===
In February 2001, Larry Kifer convinced the county that the Algiers property was worth only $3.8 million, rather than the $8.2 million appraised by the Clark County assessor's office. The Clark County Board of Equalization agreed to lower the appraisal price to $5.7 million, the same appraisal price as the year before. The reduction resulted in a 29-percent cut from Kifer's tax bill. That month, Larry Kifer announced plans for a new casino and 38-floor hotel tower to be built on the property.

In March 2001, Larry Kifer said, "We've worked on keeping the property in great condition. We continue to look at opportunities for redevelopment." That month, Kifer also said that he had previously been approved to develop a 1,000-room hotel on the Algiers property, but he was unable to find investors because they disliked the closed El Rancho resort next door, which had become an eyesore prior to its eventual demolition in October 2000. Kifer said that he wanted to incorporate as much as possible of the Algiers into any new project: "That's something we constantly hear. It's a piece of old Vegas. The place has a lot of history."

In July 2001, Chris Kaempfer, a lawyer on behalf of Algiers Inc., proposed that all or a portion of the hotel's property be swapped with a 2.3-acre (0.93 ha) parcel located further south on the Las Vegas Strip at the corner of Harmon Avenue. Outland Development Company planned to construct a 500-foot-tall Ferris wheel on the Harmon property, which was to be auctioned by the county. Under the proposed land swap, Larry Kifer would likely build a retail center on the Harmon property, located next to the Aladdin resort. The proposal would also allow the county to take control of the Algiers property, allowing for the realignment of Circus Circus Drive with Riviera Boulevard to reduce traffic. The Harmon property auction was delayed for three months for more time to examine the Algiers proposal.

A potential issue with the proposal was the value of the Algiers property, which was lower than the Harmon property. Kifer's attorneys stated that the Algiers land was worth nearly as much as the $21 million Harmon property, despite Kifer's earlier stance that the property was only worth $3.8 million. Kifer's attorneys stated that the differing values were based on the property with the outdated hotel structure on it and the property value in the event that the 1,000-room hotel resort was built. Also noted by the country was whether the road realignment at the Algiers property was really needed, as the traffic study for the area had been conducted 10 years earlier and was considered no longer valid because of changing traffic patterns. The Algiers had 31 employees as of July 2001. At the time, Larry Kifer said, "We used to worry all the time, every time they built a new hotel, that the people will dissipate. What we've learned is that there is a market for our hotel."

By October 2001, two separate appraisers had been hired by Kifer and had both placed the value of the Algiers property at $27 million, which county officials considered to be questionably high. Gary Kent, an appraiser hired by the county, found that the Algiers' appraisals included misleading and erroneous statements. In November 2001, Kaempfer stated that the county's possible realignment of the nearby roads had prevented Kifer from developing his property into a 1,087-room, 38-story hotel and timeshare resort that would have been named Grand Prix Casino Hotel. That month, the Clark County Commission voted 4–2 to begin negotiations for the land swap. Kaempfer stated that if Kifer purchased the Harmon property, he would likely lease it to another company, with Outland Development as a possibility. In December 2001, county engineers were redesigning Riviera Boulevard to determine how much of the Algiers property would be needed for the realignment, in order to help appraisers determine the value of the land. The final deal was expected to be presented to the county commission in February 2002.

By early March 2002, Kent released a report stating that the Algiers land was worth approximately $11.2 million. Upon realignment of the nearby streets, the property value would drop to approximately $6.8 million, according to Kent. Later that month, Clark County's Public Works division was told to proceed with negotiations for the land swap. However, county commissioners wanted assurances that the Algiers building would not require expensive cleanup costs such as the removal of asbestos. Mandalay Resort Group, owners of the Circus Circus resort, publicly protested the road realignment in April 2002, stating that it would disrupt traffic flow into the resort's parking lot. A decision on the land swap was postponed in May 2002, due to the objections raised by Mandalay Resort Group.

In December 2002, Kaempfer said that the county no longer needed or wanted the road realignment, and that there was no desire to swap the Algiers land if the county did not plan to proceed with the road project. Kaempfer also said that previous potential sales of the Algiers had been derailed "because any time someone wanted to buy the property, Public Works would say the realignment would cut the Algiers in two." Kaempfer asked the commission to pass a resolution to prevent the road realignment from happening in the near future, saying, "We want to make it clear to everyone that they are not going to ask for that road, so we won't be burdened with that roadway being in the way every time we try to do something with that property."

=== Closure and demolition ===
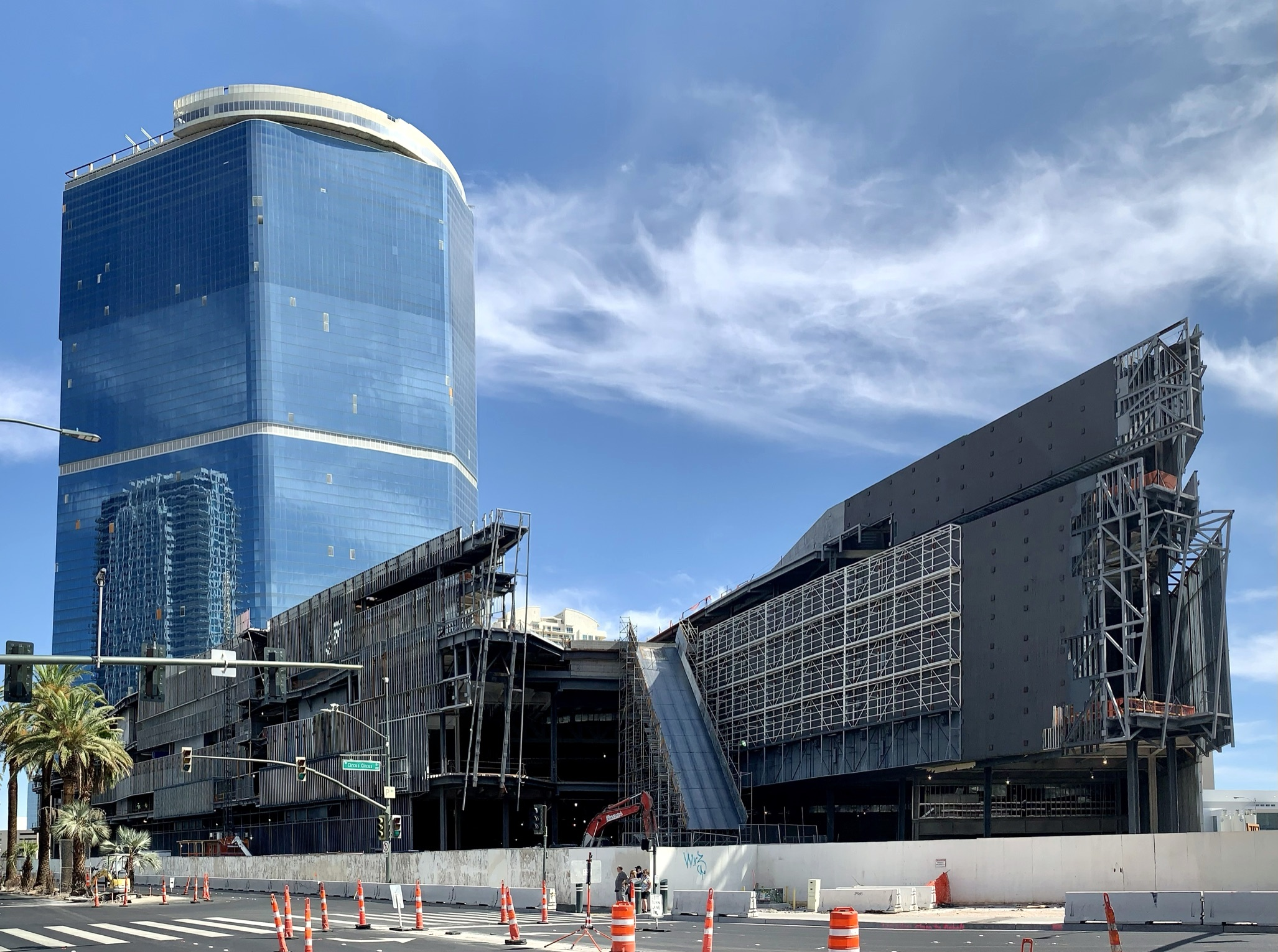
The former Algiers site is now occupied by low-rise portions of the Fontainebleau resort, seen in 2021

In May 2004, the Kifers announced that the property was in the process of being sold to F.W. Schinz, a developer who wanted to demolish the hotel to make room for the Krystle Sands condominium tower. At the time, the hotel had 25 employees, and was scheduled to close between June and September 2004. The Algiers closed on August 31, 2004.

Demolition of the hotel was approved in late September 2004, and had been completed by March 2005. That month, Schinz cancelled the Krystle Sands project and sold the property for $97 million to Turnberry Associates, which owned the nearby Turnberry Place complex, as well as the former El Rancho property. In 2007, Turnberry began building the Fontainebleau Las Vegas resort on the former El Rancho and Algiers properties. The resort opened in 2023, following construction delays.

== Architecture and features ==
The Algiers featured an Arabian/Persian theme. The hotel was made of brick, and its pink-and-turquoise painted exterior surrounded a swimming pool and a parking lot for guests. The Algiers operated a gift shop, as well as the adjacent Candlelight Wedding Chapel. The hotel also included a lounge. Palm trees and gazebos were situated near the hotel's pool, located in the center of the property and surrounded by the motel-style hotel structures. The Algiers was designed and built with large hotel rooms, as it was originally conceived as an extended stay hotel. The Algiers' interior included chandeliers and wall-mounted Tiffany lamps. Hotel rooms featured white-painted wood paneling.

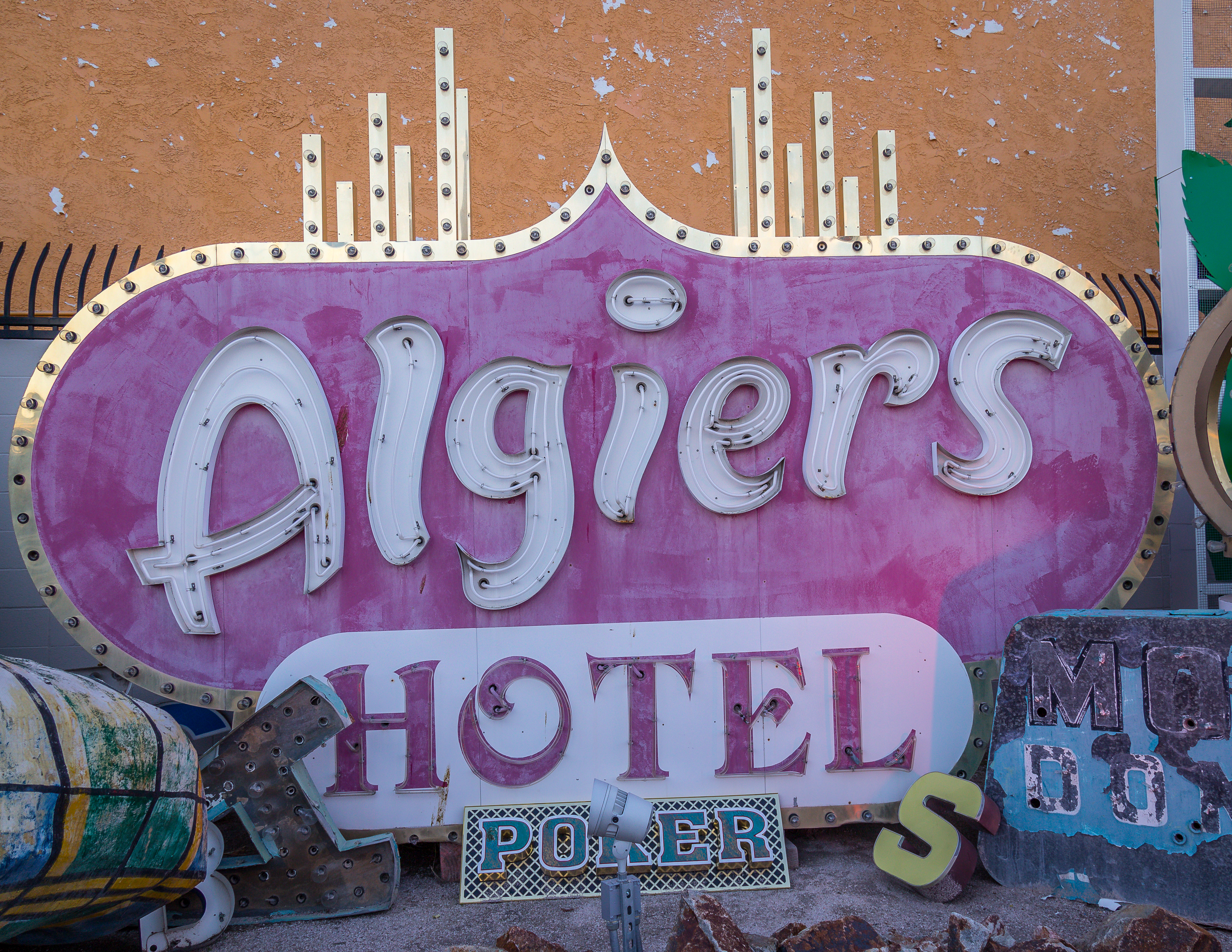
The Algiers' roadside sign, pictured at Las Vegas' Neon Museum.

The Algiers' facade was made of stucco and included several stores, each one topped by crown-shaped neon lights, similar to a Persian gateway or spire. Each store was separated by a section of vertical, polished gold raceways that featured chasing lights. Located on opposite ends of the facade were neon signs spelling out the hotel's name; the left side featured lettering in rose and ruby coloring, while the right side featured a metal sign box with the hotel's name on it. The hotel also had a roadside pole sign, located along Las Vegas Boulevard, which was lit in neon lighting and was topped by a crown. The Algiers' signs were manufactured by YESCO, and were refinished by Larsen Sign Company in 1992. The hotel structures were accessed through an archway at the left end of the facade. A second parking lot, narrow in size, was located along the facade.

The Algiers was noted as having an appearance similar to older Las Vegas hotels. In 1995, when Walsh was asked why he retained the Algiers' appearance throughout the years, he said, "I like it. A lot of people like it ... There haven't been any big changes. Just pictures and paint." Design elements that were common to older Las Vegas hotels included the roadside sign and the gold raceways. The hotel's theme of a desert paradise was also common among several older Las Vegas hotels dating as early as the 1950s, including the Aladdin, the Dunes, the Sahara, and the Sands.

In 1996, the Algiers restaurant was leased to Marilyn Johnson, who opened Tommy's Rib & Steakhouse at the hotel. Covering the restaurant walls were framed black-and-white photographs of old Las Vegas hotels and celebrities from decades earlier. At night, Johnson played music from the 1940s through the 1960s, including Bing Crosby, Johnny Mathis, and Nat King Cole. Johnson said about her customers, "They like the old-time atmosphere." According to Johnson, many customers told her that the restaurant looked exactly the same as it did around 1960. A bar window, boarded up since 1969, was reopened in October 1999 to let in sunlight and provide a view of the hotel's courtyard.

By 2001, aside from routine maintenance, the property remained virtually unchanged since its opening. Larry Kifer said, "Our thought has always been to maintain it as it was, consistently remodeling but with same decor." The Las Vegas Sun noted in 2001 that the property was quiet, stating that, "Save for the Riviera looming over the Algiers' south side, one would never know by standing in its courtyard that the hotel is on the Strip. […] Standing on the small outdoor patio near the hotel entrance, the clicking of yellow light bulbs flickering from the hotel's red-painted restaurant is the only sound you hear." Hal Rothman, a history professor for the University of Nevada, Las Vegas, said at that time, "It is a wonderful piece of old Las Vegas,. It's one of the things that if in another city it would become a historical place ... It's the archetypical 1950s-style of the Las Vegas hotel." As of 2001, the Algiers had 106 hotel rooms, including one suite. At that time, the hotel also featured video poker machines in the bar. After the hotel's closure, the roadside sign was donated to Las Vegas' Neon Museum.

== In popular culture ==
During the 1990s, the hotel was featured in the films Leaving Las Vegas and Austin Powers: International Man of Mystery. In 2003, the hotel was photographed for the Italian edition of Elle.

== See also ==
- La Concha Motel
- Glass Pool Inn
