= Harry Wald =

American businessman

- Born: Hans Eichenwald; May 19, 1924; Rheine, Province of Westphalia, Germany
- Died: May 8, 1996 (aged 71); Washington, D.C., U.S.
- Resting place: Arlington National Cemetery
- Occupation: Businessman
- Spouse: Maryellen McPeak
- Children: 1 son, 1 daughter
- Parent(s): Hugo Eichenwald; Fanny

Harry Wald (May 19, 1924 – May 8, 1996) was a German-born American casino executive who was able to escape Germany before The Holocaust, and who was later a U.S. Army soldier in World War II. He served as the president of the Caesars Palace, a hotel and casino in Las Vegas, Nevada. He subsequently served as senior vice president of MGM Grand Hotel and Casino.

== Early life ==
Hans Eichenwald was born on May 19, 1924, in Rheine, Westphalia, Germany.

Before World War II, Wald escaped to the United States thanks to the United Jewish Charities in 1938, as he was just 13.

His brother Fritz was murdered by the Nazis at Auschwitz.

His parents Hugo and Fanny died in the Theresienstadt concentration camp.

His sister Hanna was on the last Kindertransport boat from Holland to England in 1940. Hanna spent the remainder of the war in England, and later emigrated to the United States.

Wald was raised by Walter Litt and his wife, Regina, in Detroit, Michigan. Wald became a naturalized U.S. citizen in 1943. By the end of the war, he joined the United States Army Counterintelligence training at Camp Ritchie and served in France, Belgium, Holland and Germany. Moreover, he served in the 30th Infantry Division of the Army National Guard. He received several awards for his service, including the Legion of Merit, the Combat Infantryman Badge and the Bronze Star Medal.

== Career ==
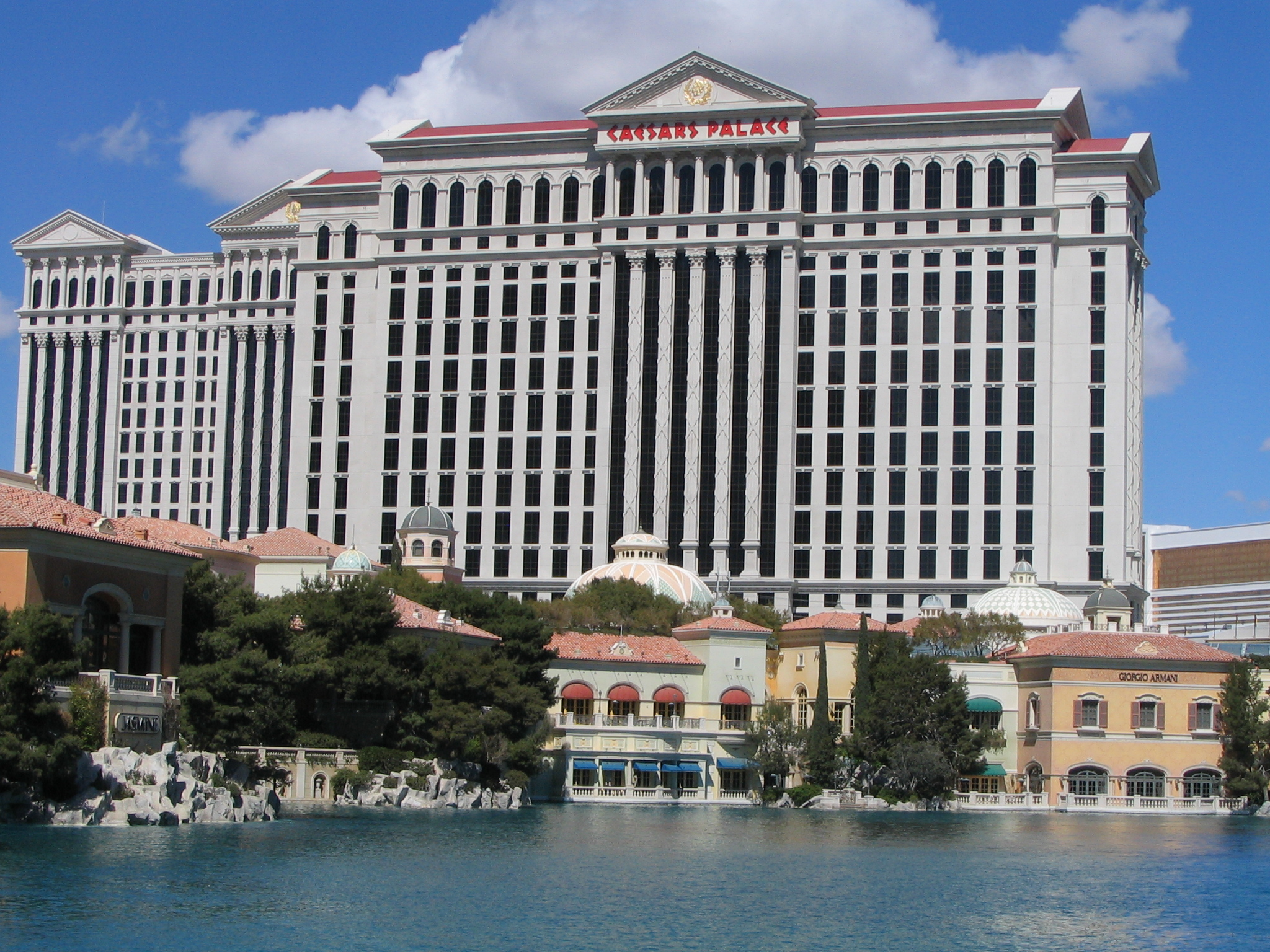
The Caesars Palace in Las Vegas, Nevada.

Wald met Jay Sarno in San Francisco, California, after the war. When Sarno developed Caesars Palace, a hotel and casino in Las Vegas, Nevada, Wald was hired as its project manager from 1964 to 1966. He then served as its vice president and corporate secretary from 1966 to 1974, as its chief executive officer from 1974 to 1981, and as its president from January 1981 to September 1984. He continued to work for the Caesars Palace until January 1985. In the 1980s, he reinvited Las Vegas as the world's capital of boxing championships, as hosting such events proved to be very lucrative to Caesars Palace. Meanwhile, he brought car races, like the Grand Prix, and he negotiated a broadcasting contract with NBC despite not being lucrative to Caesars Palace. He also brought tennis tournaments to the city. Additionally, he oversaw the rise of horse race betting in Las Vegas.

Wald served as senior vice president of MGM Grand Hotel and Casino from 1985 to 1993. He was the project manager for the redevelopment of the El Rancho Hotel and Casino in 1993, but the project failed. He also served as the president of the Nevada Resort Association.

Wald served as brigadier general in the Nevada Army National Guard from 1973 to 1978. He served as the president of the United Way of Las Vegas in 1982. He served on the board of the Las Vegas Convention and Visitors Authority and the advisory board of the Clark County Community College. He also served on the Southern Nevada Drug Abuse Council. Additionally, he served on the executive board of the Boy Scouts of America.

== Personal life and death ==
Wald married Maryellen McPeak. Wald had a son, Kerry Lee Eichenwald, and a daughter, Allyson Wald Butto together with his first wife. They resided in Las Vegas, Nevada.

Wald died on May 8, 1996, at the Walter Reed Army Hospital in Washington, D.C. He was buried at the Arlington National Cemetery.
