= Fontainebleau Las Vegas =

Hotel and casino in Winchester, Nevada

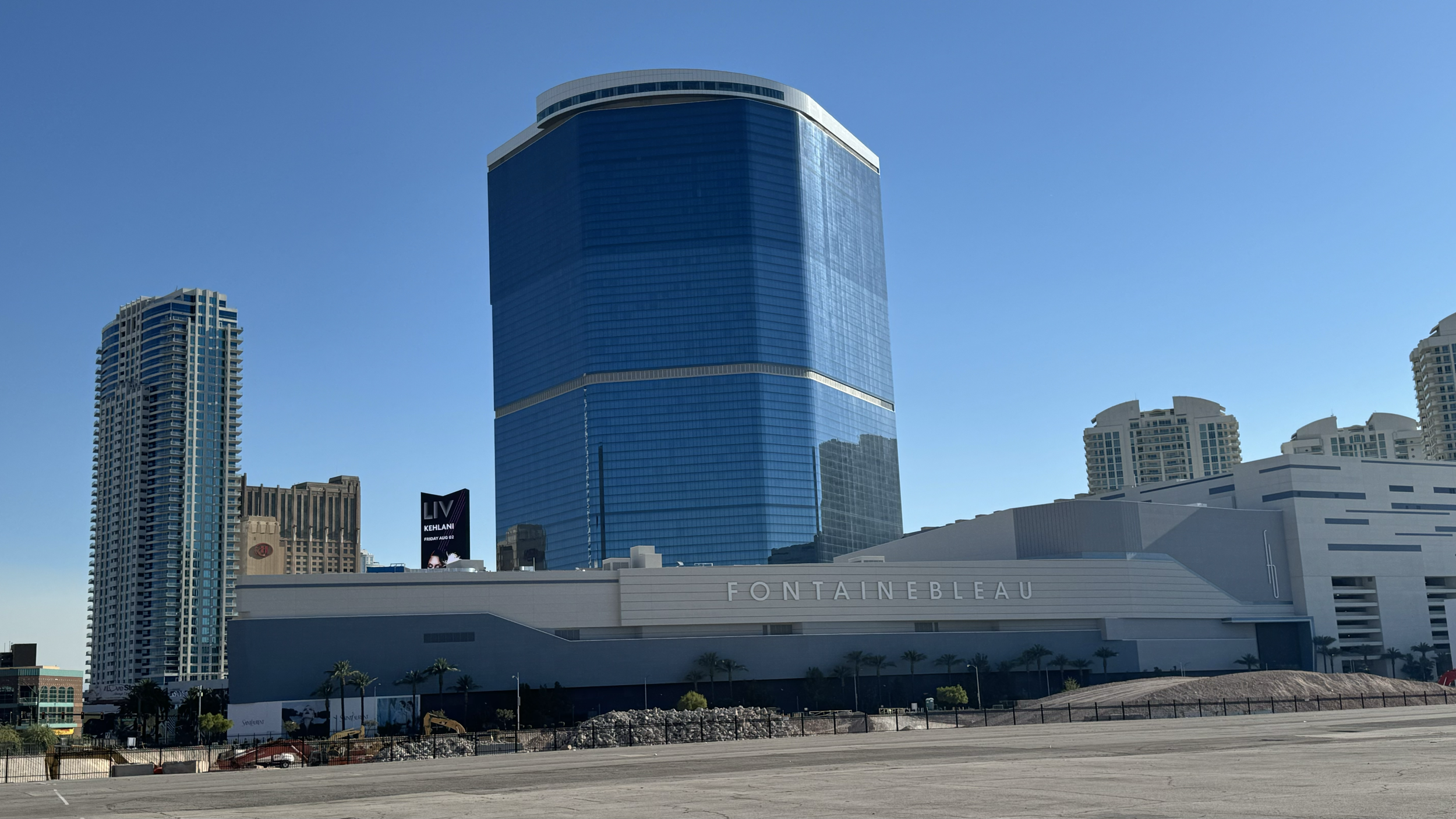
- Fontainebleau Las Vegas in 2024

- Location within Las Vegas Strip Location within Nevada
- Interactive map of Fontainebleau Las Vegas
- Location: Winchester, Nevada, U.S.; 2777 South Las Vegas Boulevard; 36°8′15″N 115°9′32″W
- Opened: December 13, 2023; 2 years ago
- No. of rooms: 3,644
- Gaming space: 173,000 sq ft (16,100 m^{2})
- Notable restaurants: Chyna Club; La Fontaine; Mother Wolf; Papi Steak
- Casino type: Land-based
- Owner: Fontainebleau Development; Koch Real Estate Investments
- Architect: Carlos Zapata Studio
- Previous names: The Drew Las Vegas (2018–2021)
- Website: www.fontainebleaulasvegas.com

The Fontainebleau Las Vegas is a luxury resort and casino on the Las Vegas Strip in Winchester, Nevada. It is owned and operated by Fontainebleau Development; is a sister property to Fontainebleau Miami Beach; and sits on the 24.5-acre (9.9 ha) site previously occupied by the El Rancho Hotel and Casino and the Algiers Hotel. Originally proposed by developer Fontainebleau Resorts, owned by Jeff Soffer, the property's owner and developer has changed several times since the project was announced in May 2005.

The project was designed by Carlos Zapata Studio with Bergman Walls and Associates as the executive architect. Construction began in February 2007, and the hotel tower was topped off on November 14, 2008. The tower rises 67 stories, standing 737 feet (224.6 m) high. When ultimately completed, it would become the tallest occupied building in Nevada.

A group of banks had agreed to finance the project, but was sued by Fontainebleau in April 2009, after it cut off funding. Construction was put on hold two months later, when the project entered Chapter 11 bankruptcy. The Fontainebleau was 70-percent completed, and the opening had been scheduled for October 2009. Carl Icahn purchased the project out of bankruptcy in 2010, but never restarted construction. Seven years later, the unfinished resort was sold to investment firms Witkoff Group and New Valley LLC, which planned to open it as The Drew Las Vegas in 2022. However, construction stopped in March 2020, due to the COVID-19 pandemic in Nevada.

In February 2021, Soffer repurchased the project through his company Fontainebleau Development, with Koch Real Estate Investments as a partner, reinstated the original name of the project, and commenced construction again in November 2021. In its final form, the project was developed at a cost of $3.7 billion, making it the second most-expensive resort in Las Vegas, and opened on December 13, 2023 — including a 173,000 sq ft (16,100 m^{2}) casino and 3,644 hotel rooms.

== History ==
=== Background ===
The site of the future Fountainebleau was initially occupied by the Thunderbird hotel and casino, opened in 1948. It was later renamed as the Silverbird, and then as El Rancho, before closing in 1992. Turnberry Associates purchased the 21-acre (8.5 ha) property in 2000, for $45 million. The company imploded El Rancho later that year, to make room for a London-themed resort. The project was ultimately canceled because of an economic downturn caused by the September 11 attacks.

A privately held company known as Fontainebleau Resorts was later co-founded by Jeff Soffer, who was the chairman and majority owner of Turnberry Associates. In March 2005, Turnberry Associates paid $97 million to purchase 3.6 acres (1.5 ha) of adjacent property – south of the former El Rancho – that had previously been occupied by the Algiers Hotel. The Algiers was to be replaced by the Krystle Sands, a high-rise condominium project that was cancelled earlier that month. The purchase gave Fontainebleau Resorts and Turnberry a total of 25 acres (10 ha).

Fontainebleau logo (2008)

Fontainebleau Resorts and Turnberry announced the Fontainebleau Las Vegas on May 12, 2005, as a casino and hotel resort, with an expected cost of $1.5 billion. The project would be a sister property to the Fontainebleau Miami Beach hotel, purchased by Fontainebleau Resorts earlier that year. The Las Vegas location would be the second in a planned chain of Fontainebleau resorts. It would be built on the former property of the El Rancho and Algiers, located immediately west of the Turnberry Place high-rise condominium complex. Groundbreaking was initially expected to occur by March 2006, with the project planned to be opened by 2008. Glenn Schaeffer, the former president of Mandalay Resort Group, was hired to oversee the new project as the president and chief executive officer of Fontainebleau Resorts.

The Fontainebleau was designed by Carlos Zapata Studio, with Bergman Walls and Associates serving as the executive architect. The resort would have a total of 3.4 million square feet, including a 100,000 sq ft (9,300 m^{2}) casino. The hotel tower would have 3,889 rooms, including 2,871 hotel rooms and 1,018 condo hotel units. The resort would also feature two dozen restaurants, a performing arts theater, a spa inspired by the Blue Lagoon in Iceland, and a 300,000 sq ft (28,000 m^{2}) retail mall. Schaeffer predicted that less than one-third of the resort's revenues would come from its casino.

=== Initial construction: 2007–2009 ===
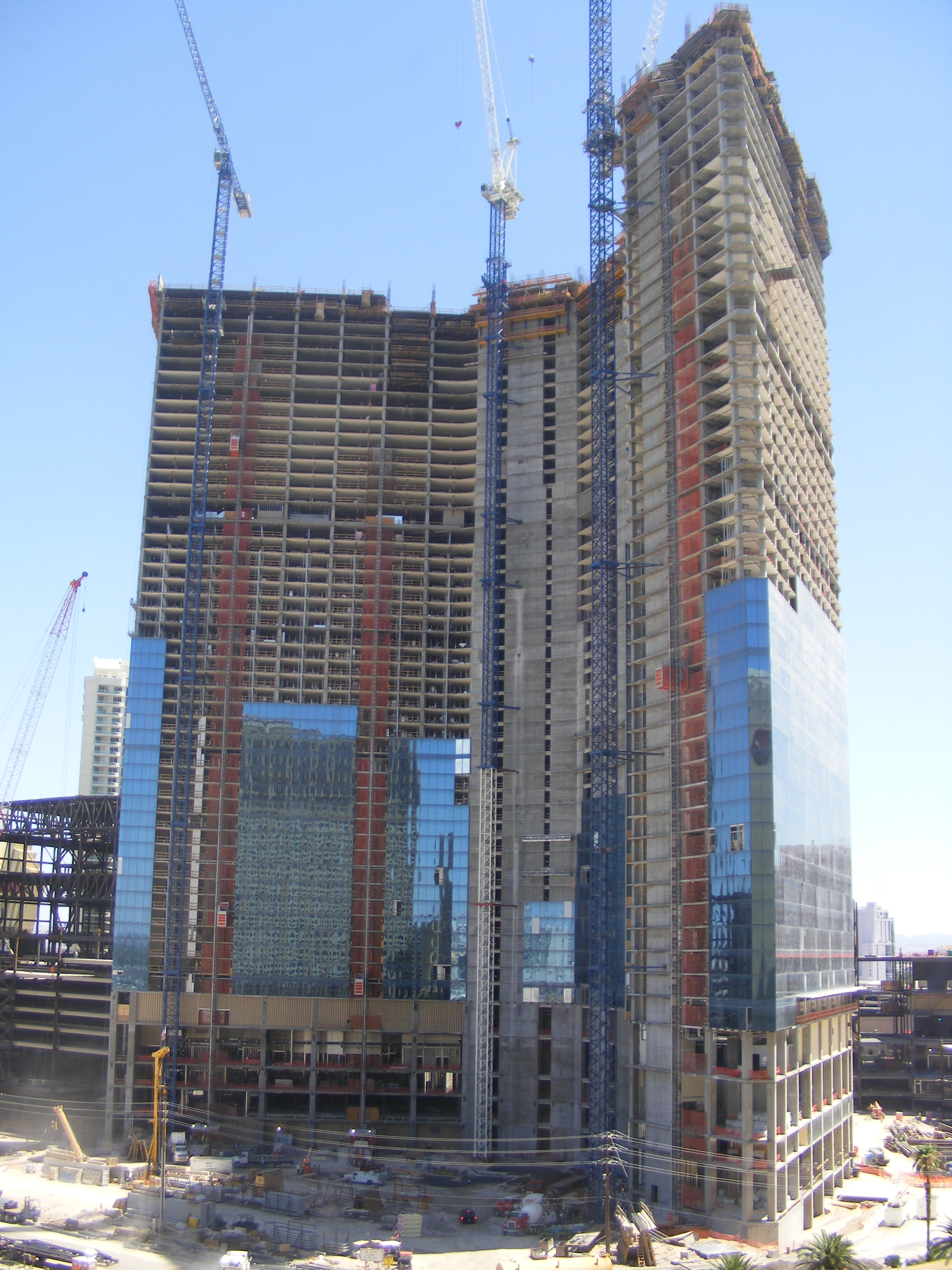
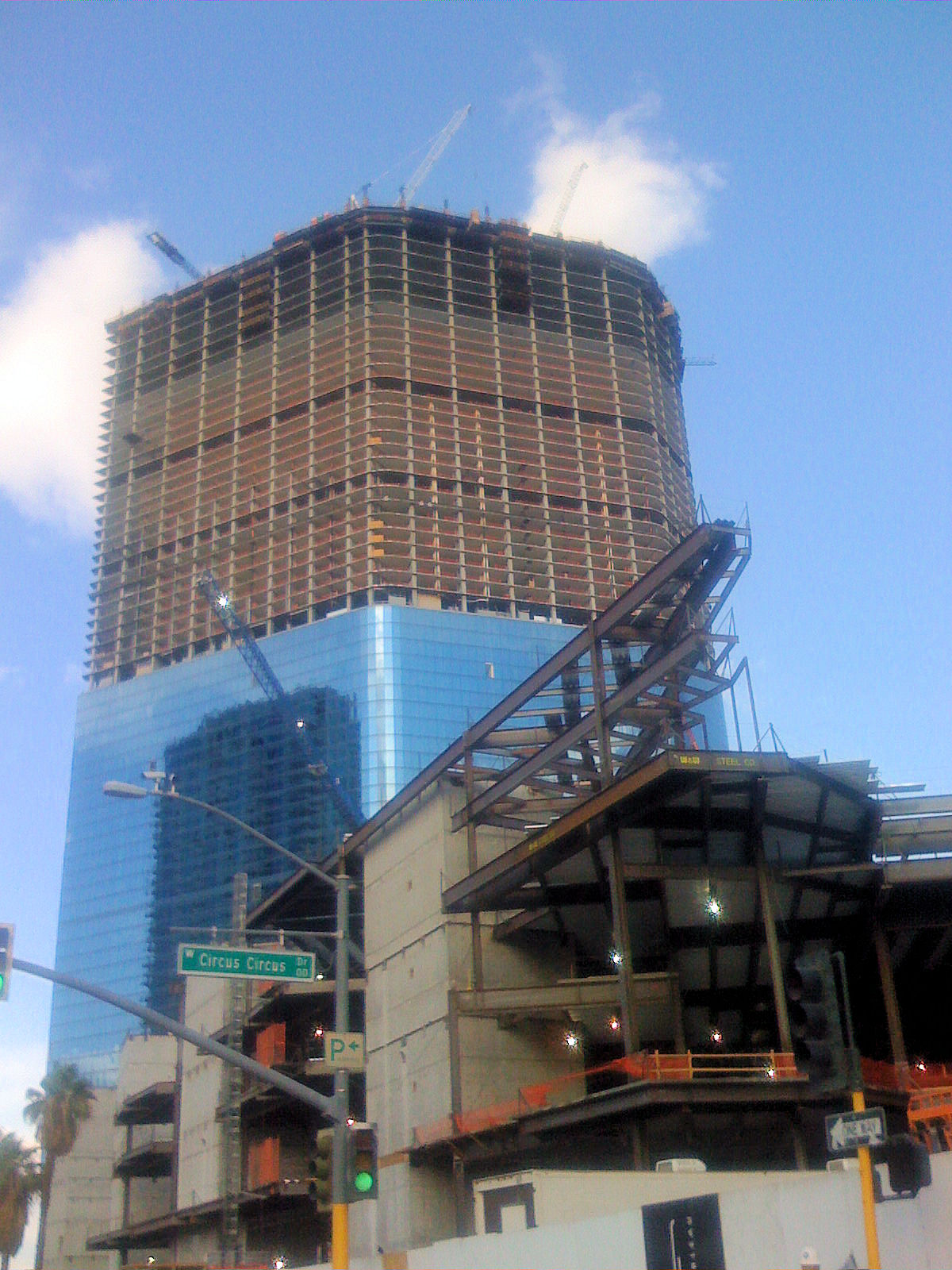
Window installation in 2008

Turnberry West Construction began construction of the Fontainebleau Las Vegas in February 2007. The company did not do any of its own work, instead relying on a network of subcontractors. The project was expected to cost $2.8 billion. Publishing and Broadcasting Limited purchased 19.6 percent of Fontainebleau Resorts for $250 million to help fund the project. In June 2007, Fontainebleau Resorts secured approximately $4 billion from a group of banks to pay off debts and to finish its projects, including the Fontainebleau Las Vegas, which was expected to open in fall 2009. The company Ullico would also provide financing to the project.

In July 2007, a 70-person team of ironworkers stopped working in areas of the resort that they said were unsafe. They resumed work after three days, following the implementation of several safety measures. The following month, a construction worker died after a 30-foot fall on the property. Several days later, a large concrete slab in the parking garage fell and caused slabs on two lower floors to collapse. No workers were injured or killed in this incident.

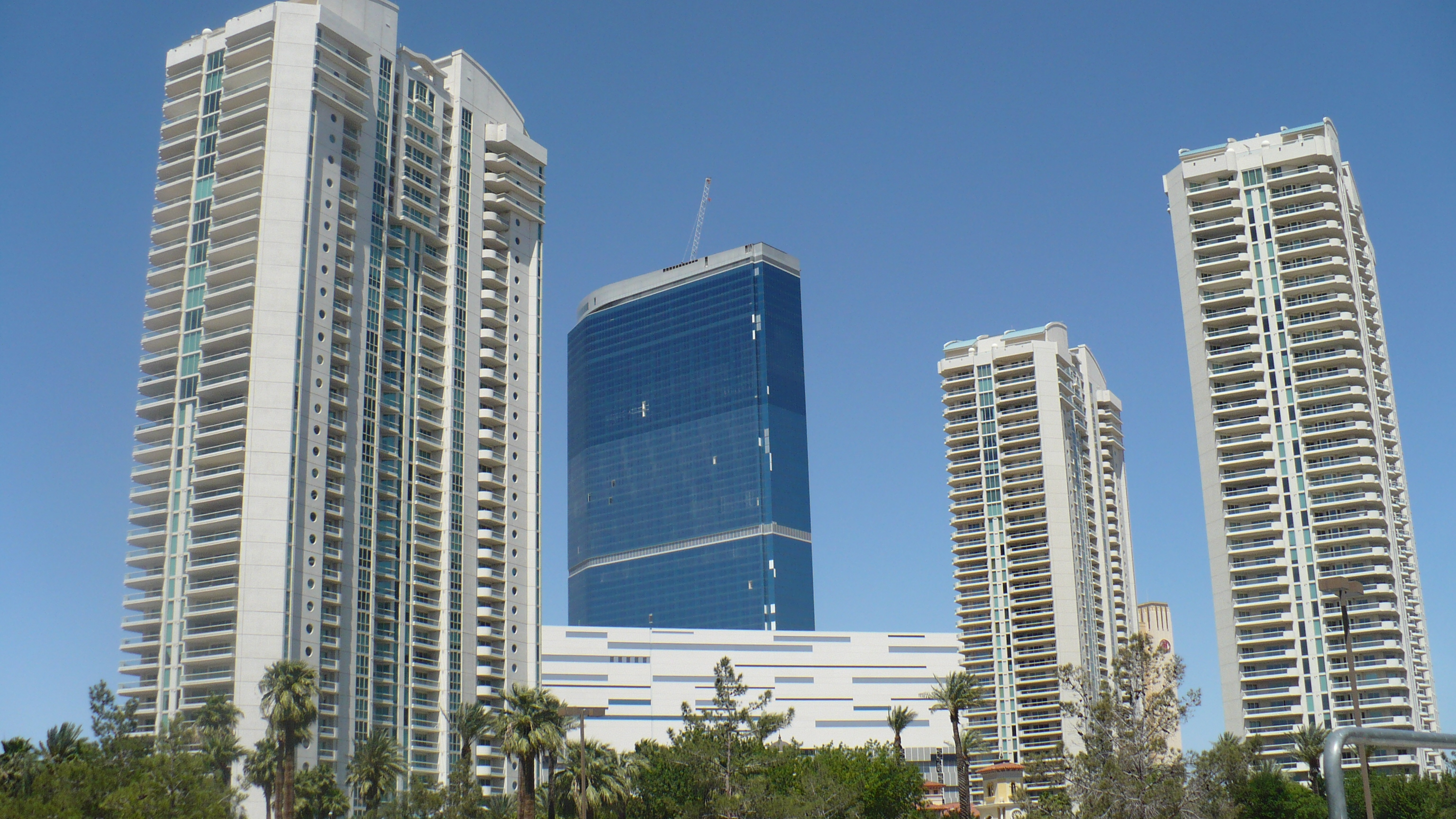
Fontainebleau and Turnberry Place towers in 2010

The resort's parking garage was to stand seven stories, with the first two floors to be located underground. In mid-2007, plans were approved to increase the garage to 23 stories. Later that year, residents of Turnberry Place alleged that they were deceived by Turnberry, saying they were never notified of the garage's size increase, which would hamper their views. Other residents were concerned about the impact of noise and pollutants from the new project.

Soffer said Turnberry did a "respectful job" of building the Fontainebleau hotel tower away from Turnberry Place residents. Soffer also stated that the land was zoned for a hotel and casino, and said that residents knew such a project would ultimately be built on the property. Turnberry Place residents asked a district judge to rule on whether the Clark County Commission should have approved the garage re-design, which was alleged to be in violation of a county ordinance; the judge ruled in favor of the project, stating that the re-design was legally approved.

The 67-story hotel tower was topped off on November 14, 2008. Construction had begun before final designs were finished, a common practice for Las Vegas resorts to get them opened sooner. However, this would often result in costly do-over work having to be done. As of mid-2009, there were still areas of the project that had yet to be finalized. Some areas, such as the casino and hotel rooms, had undergone numerous redesigns. Restaurants were among the uncompleted portions of the resort, although many hotel rooms had been finished.

=== Financial issues: 2009 ===
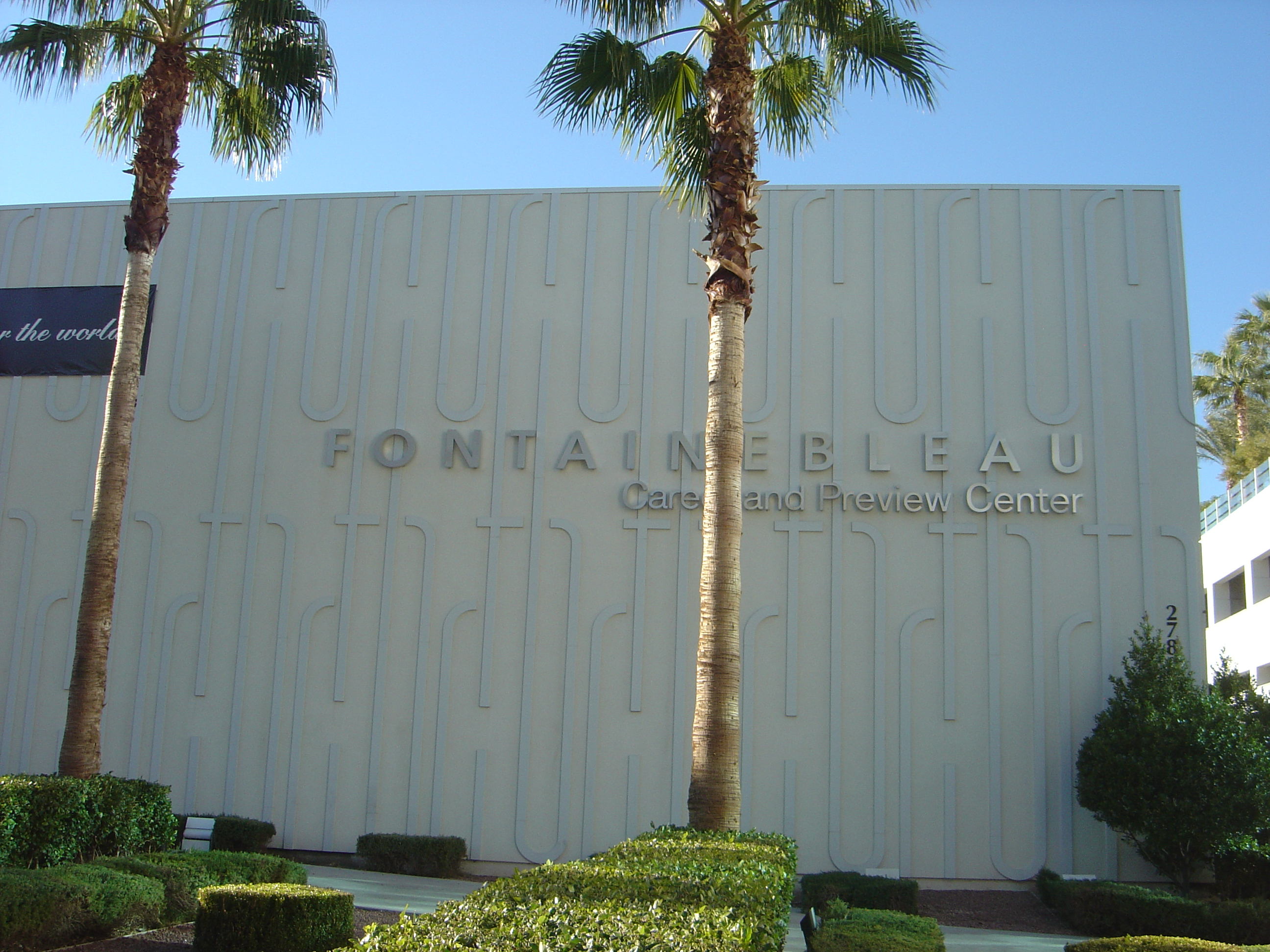
Condo preview center, opened across from the resort in December 2008

In April 2009, the project filed a $3 billion lawsuit against the group of banking lenders, alleging that they reneged on their agreement to provide $800 million in funding. The banks stated that the loan was terminated because of an unspecified default, a claim that the lawsuit denied.

The banks largely declined to comment on the case; they denied wrongdoing but did not specify how the project wound up in default. It was later confirmed that the project had gone substantially over its construction budget, and the banks determined that the project was in default under their credit agreement. The banks also alleged that Fontainebleau officials made inaccurate statements to hide the project's financial problems. According to the banks, Fontainebleau wanted $1.3 billion in debt to be forgiven. The sale of condo units had been pivotal to paying off the project's debt, although the 2008 financial crisis and weak demand in the local condo market forced Fontainebleau Resorts to reassess this strategy.

The bank group was led by Bank of America, which began negotiating with Fontainebleau shortly after the lawsuit was filed. Through a separate lending group, the project had $130 million to continue construction while the lawsuit proceeded. However, the second group partially pulled its financing in late April 2009, after the first group rescinded its loan on the project. Work was reduced to skeleton crews, and construction proceeded at a slower pace. In May 2009, Fontainebleau filed an amendment to its lawsuit, stating that Deutsche Bank, part of the main banking group, had a conflict of interest. The bank had an ownership stake in the upcoming Cosmopolitan resort, also under construction on the Las Vegas Strip. Deutsche Bank was accused of "seeking to destroy the Fontainebleau in order to minimize competition" for the Cosmopolitan. The bank was to provide $80 million to the Fontainebleau. The allegations against Deutsche Bank were eventually dropped.

During May 2009, construction consulting firm CCCS International filed a lawsuit against the Fontainebleau, alleging wrongful termination from the project. CCCS was hired as construction manager in 2008. According to the company, Fontainebleau officials said that the project was "severely over budget" and needed a construction manager to provide cost management and auditing services, in order to recover "prior unnecessary overpayments". In its lawsuit, CCCS alleged the discovery of "fraudulent billing practices and inappropriate payment methods" used by the Fontainebleau, stating that this discovery led to its termination. CCCS also alleged that Fontainebleau did not have financing to fund its consulting services, and that the project failed to disclose this. CCCS stated that it was owed more than $1 million. A Fontainebleau spokesman said that CCCS was fired because it failed to perform its duties.

Corporate layoffs began in May 2009, as a result of the bank group withholding its loan. Schaeffer was among those who left the project, without explanation. Schaeffer had been primarily responsible for securing more than $1 billion in loans for the Fontainebleau, and he was to operate the resort's casino.

==== Bankruptcy ====
Facing numerous liens and financing problems, the Fontainebleau filed for Chapter 11 bankruptcy on June 9, 2009. The project had 1,000 to 5,000 creditors, including various subcontractors who were owed more than $250 million. Subcontractors wanted a committee formed to represent them in the bankruptcy proceedings, rather than Turnberry West Construction. The $3 billion lawsuit against the bank group was withdrawn and instead refiled in U.S. bankruptcy court. Fontainebleau Las Vegas LLC sought court approval for an immediate $656 million loan from the bank group. However, the banks did not believe that this would be enough to finish construction. Meanwhile, Crown Limited (previously Publishing and Broadcasting Limited) ended any further investment in the Fontainebleau project. On June 11, 2009, it was announced that construction had been halted while the project proceeded through bankruptcy. The project was 70-percent completed, and the opening had been scheduled for October 2009.

A month after the bankruptcy filing, term lenders sued the bank group. Turnberry West also filed a lawsuit against its sister company, Fontainebleau Las Vegas LLC, which owned the project. Turnberry West alleged that its liens against the project took priority over those filed by lenders. Both companies were owned by Soffer. Mediation attempts were unsuccessful, and a judge determined that the case would go to trial. After years of lawsuits, courts ruled in Bank of America's favor; and the bank reached a $300 million settlement with lenders.

=== Prospective buyers and Icahn ownership: 2009–2015 ===
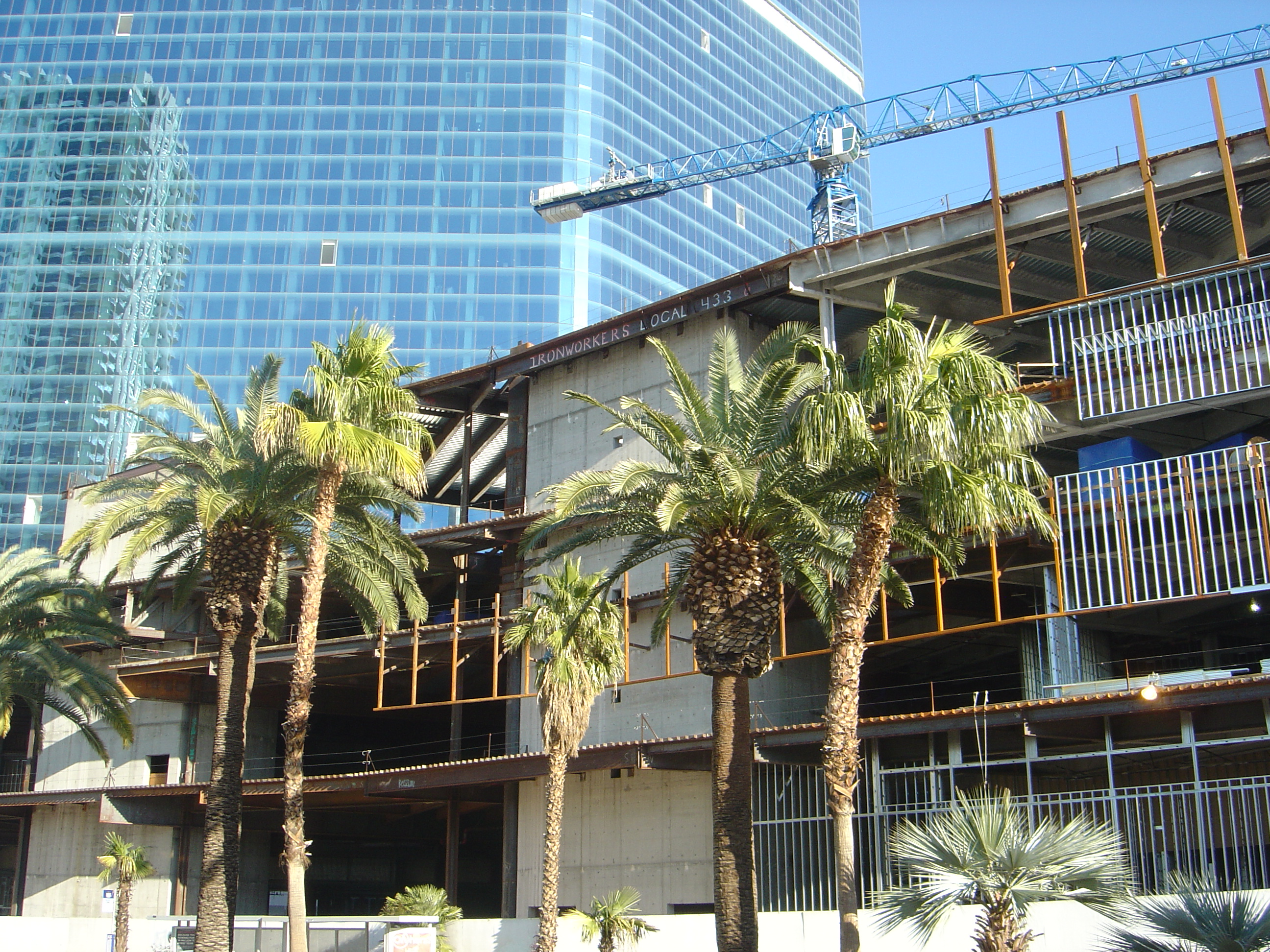
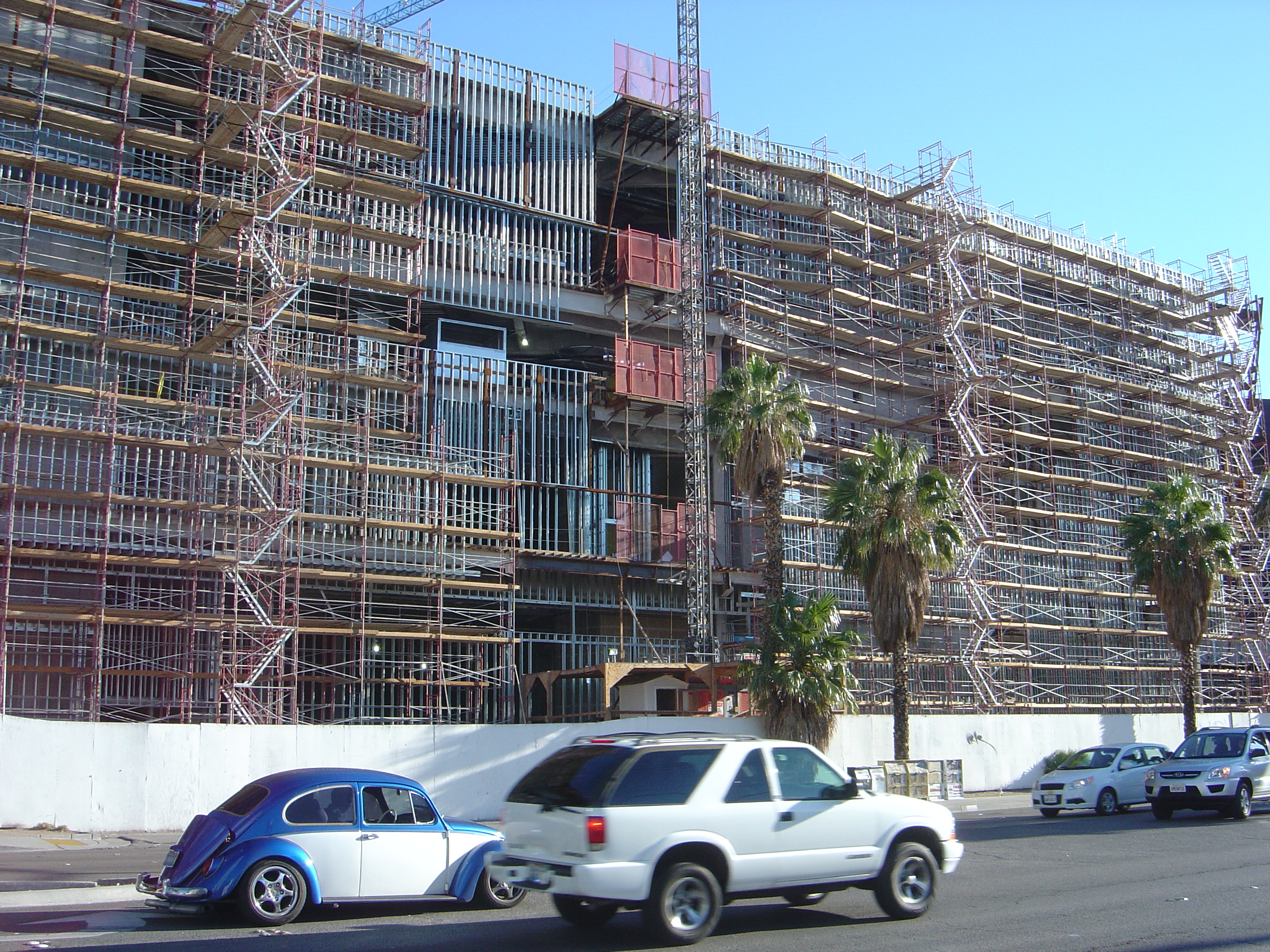
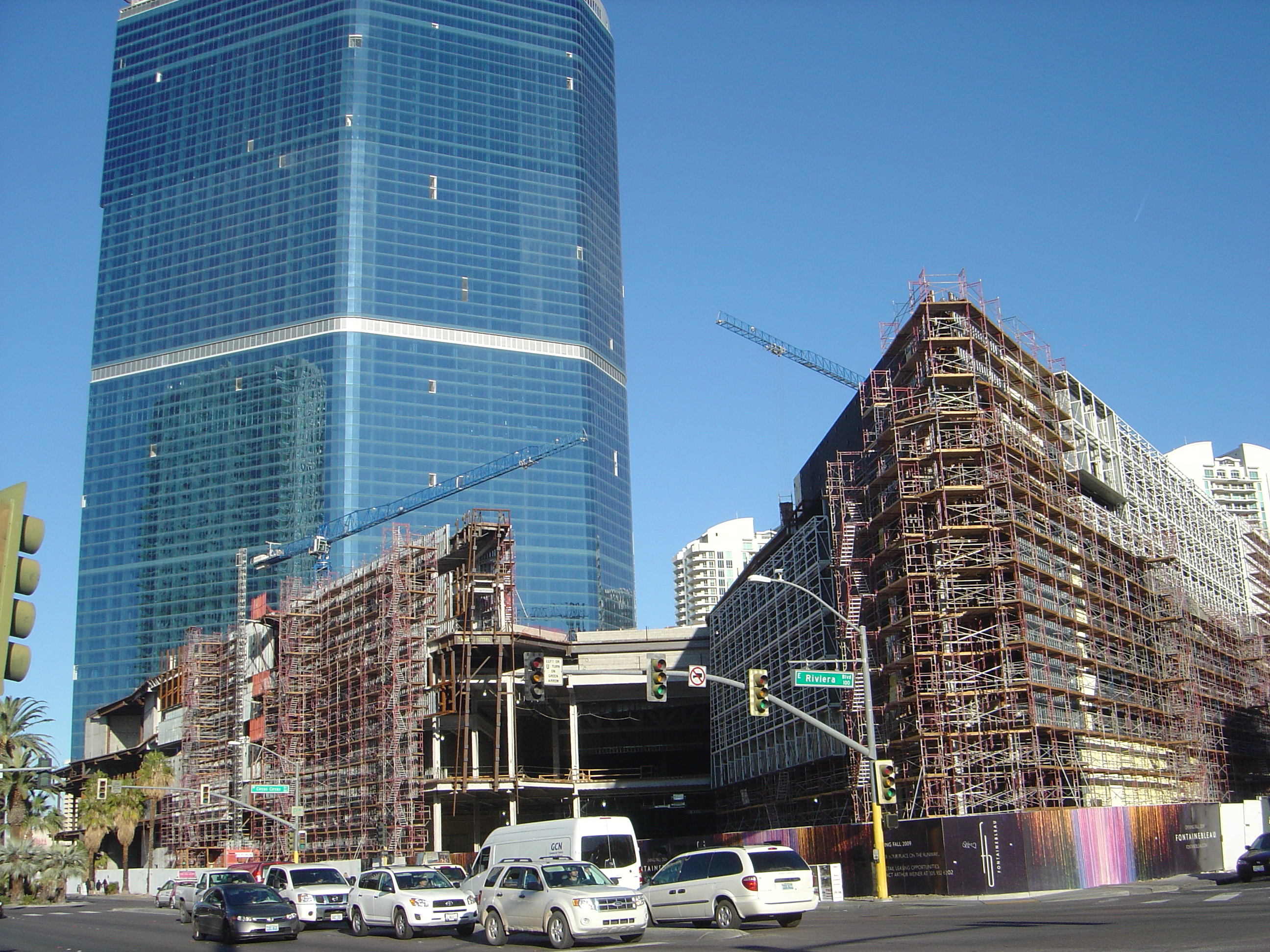
Exposed, lower-level portions of the resort in 2011

In June 2009, executives from Apollo Management and Wynn Resorts toured the Fontainebleau facility with an interest in purchasing the project. Ullico was also in discussions with Fontainebleau to help finance the resort's completion, after already contributing $447.6 million to the project. In September 2009, Penn National Gaming emerged as a prospective buyer. Penn had toured the project several times, and it sought a partner to help finish the resort.

In October 2009, a judge overseeing the bankruptcy case ruled that the Fontainebleau project be sold as soon as possible, appointing an examiner to handle the sale. However, the term lenders had wanted the Chapter 11 case converted into a Chapter 7 liquidation. Penn offered $50 million for the project. In November 2009, corporate raider and financier Carl Icahn offered $136 million. A bidding war ensued, and Penn dropped out of the auction in January 2010, after Icahn raised his bid to $156 million. Meanwhile, real estate developer Luke Brugnara announced that he would place a $170 million bid for the Fontainebleau.

Icahn ultimately won control of the Fontainebleau, taking over ownership in February 2010. Icahn was the only qualified person to bid on the project; two other bids were disqualified because they failed to include a deposit. Icahn planned to wait for an economic rebound before deciding on what to do with the Fontainebleau. In October 2010, he auctioned off furnishings for the resort, indicating that he had no intention of finishing the project. While the project sat vacant, it was sometimes used by local firefighters as a training ground for fire drills.

A large crane, used for constructing the hotel tower, was dismantled in May 2014. The crane, like the unfinished resort, was considered an eyesore and a reminder of the Great Recession. Rusted, lower-floor portions, located along the sidewalk on Las Vegas Boulevard, also presented a poor appearance for the area. In 2015, Icahn agreed to county requests for an exterior upgrade in the form of a cosmetic wrap. At the end of the year, he also listed the Fontainebleau for sale at an asking price of $650 million.

=== The Drew Las Vegas: 2017–2021 ===
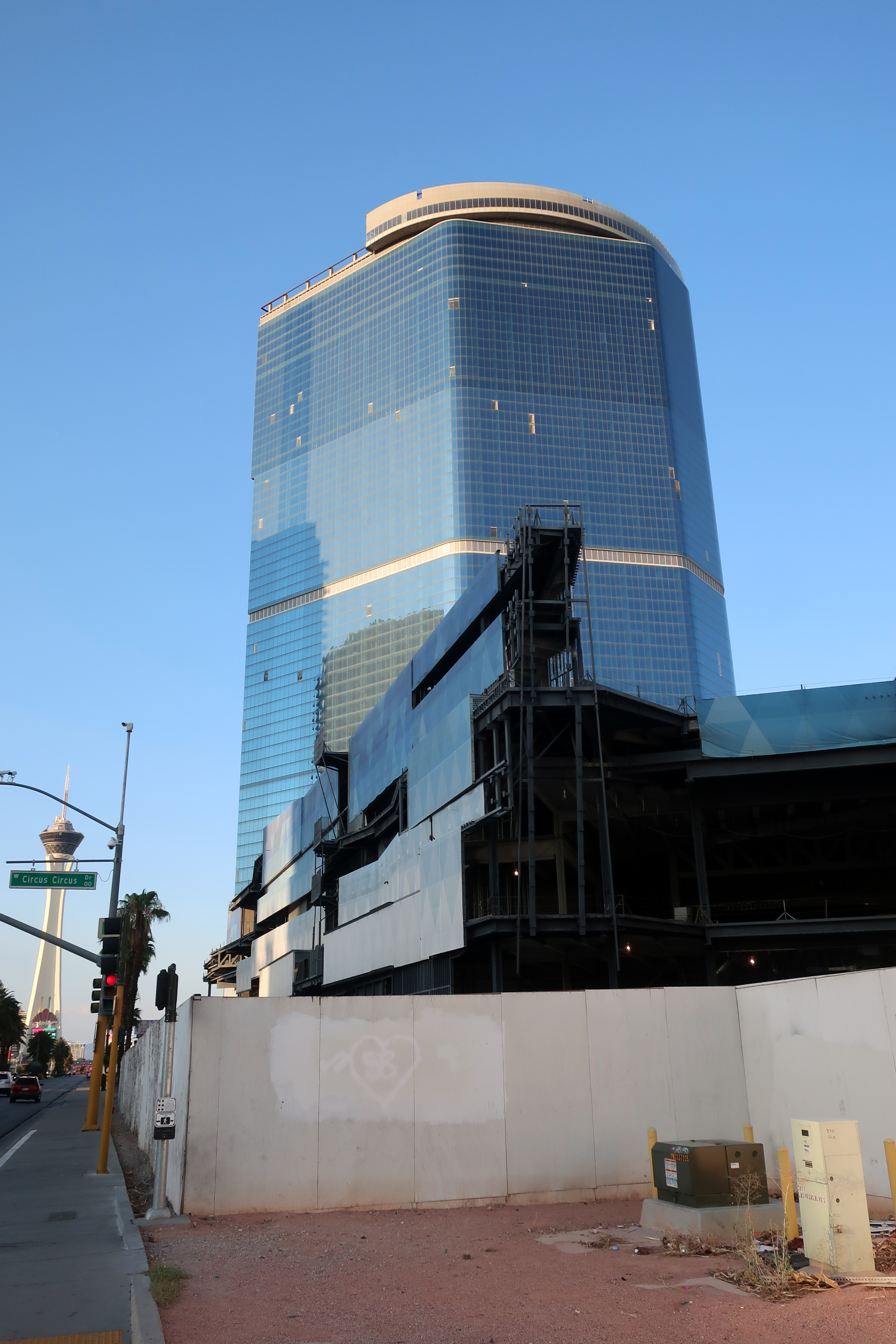
The Drew in August 2018

In August 2017, investment firms Witkoff Group and New Valley LLC purchased the resort for $600 million, with plans to rename it. The purchase and planned improvements were financed through Deutsche Bank, Goldman Sachs and JPMorgan. In subsequent months, the Las Vegas-based Grand Canyon Development Partners became involved with the project. Penta Building Group was hired to finish the resort, with construction expected to resume in 2018. Plans to finish the project's design and to obtain a construction loan were expedited in December 2017, after the passage of the Tax Cuts and Jobs Act of 2017.

On February 12, 2018, Witkoff and Marriott International announced a partnership to open the project as The Drew Las Vegas in late 2020. The resort would include two hotel brands by Marriott, which would manage them and invest $50 million in the project. The "Drew" name was a tribute to Witkoff's deceased 22-year-old son, Andrew Witkoff, who died of an OxyContin overdose in 2011. The resort was designed by the architecture firm Diller Scofidio + Renfro.

A man trespassed onto the Drew property in March 2018, and sparked a number of fires causing $10 million in damage to several areas, including a ballroom and the 11th floor of the parking garage. The man was later apprehended and charged with arson.

In April 2019, Witkoff announced that the opening would be delayed until the second quarter of 2022, due to prolonged design work. Bobby Baldwin was announced as the chief executive officer of The Drew Las Vegas in November 2019.

Construction was suspended in March 2020, due to the COVID-19 pandemic in Nevada. Contractors filed liens totaling millions of dollars, for allegedly unpaid work, and executives laid off amid the pandemic sued as well.

=== Fontainebleau revival and opening: 2021–present ===
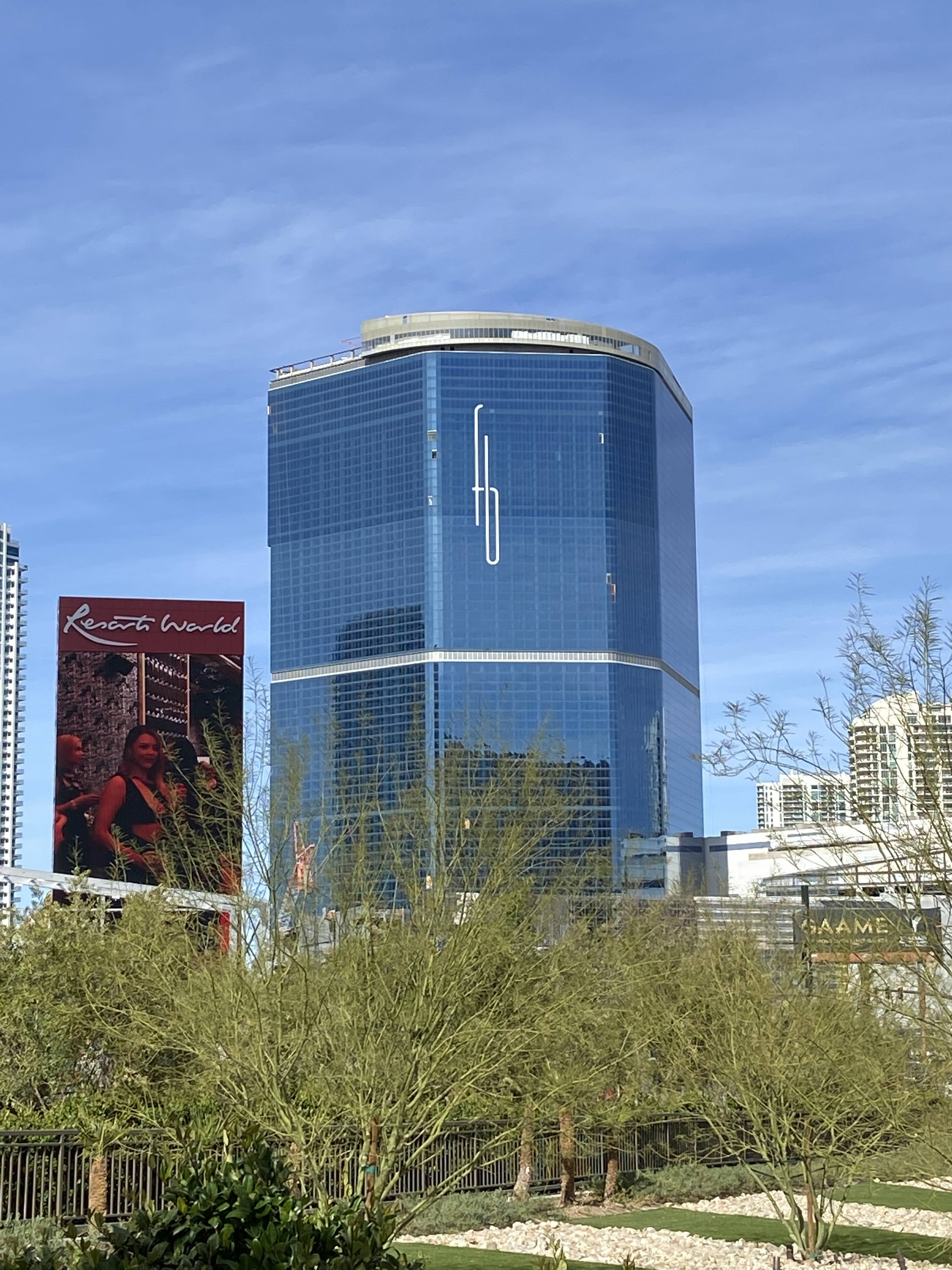
Fontainebleau's "fb" logo signage in 2022

In February 2021, nearly sixteen years after he first announced it, Soffer bought back the project through his Florida-based company, Fontainebleau Development. The company partnered with Koch Real Estate Investments on the purchase, and various options were under consideration for the property, which was 75-percent complete. Although Soffer was busy with other projects at that time, when the pandemic hit he saw a "great opportunity" to return to the project and decided to buy it back. The project was purchased for $350 million, and the property was valued at $615.5 million. Marriott exited the project later in 2021, citing an amicable agreement with Fontainebleau Development, which instead would manage and operate the hotel itself.

On November 9, 2021, Fontainebleau Development held a construction commencement ceremony for the project, announcing that it would be renamed Fontainebleau Las Vegas once again. Richardson Construction was hired as general contractor. Soffer stuck largely to the project's original plans; changes included a reduction in the retail component and the removal of condominiums. Crews also gutted 1,800 finished hotel rooms, as Soffer found their designs to be outdated. The number of rooms was also reduced, allowing for larger penthouses and luxury suites. Carlos Zapata Studio remained as the exterior architect, while David Collins Studio handled interior design. Landscape architectural firm Lifescapes International designed the exterior and interior landscapes for the entire property.

The Fontainebleau was developed at a cost of $3.7 billion, making it the second most-expensive resort in Las Vegas after nearby Resorts World, which cost $4.3 billion and opened in 2021. The Fontainebleau opened on December 13, 2023, coinciding with Soffer's birthday. Pre-opening festivities were held at the resort throughout the day and attended by hundreds of invited guests, including celebrities. The public opening occurred shortly before midnight.

On December 31, 2023, Fontainebleau Resorts sponsored New Year's Eve festivities at New York City's Times Square to promote the new resort and the 70th anniversary of the Fontainebleau Miami Beach. As part of the sponsorship, bowtie patterns were incorporated into the lighting of the ball, resembling the resort's logo and the bowtie shape of Times Square itself.

Several top executives left the Fontainebleau within a month of its opening, and Wynn Las Vegas soon filed a lawsuit accusing the property of poaching its employees, who were under a non-compete clause. To increase visitor traffic, a new president was named shortly after the opening and the marketing strategy was updated.

In 2024, the magazine Time included the Fontainebleau in its annual list of "World's Greatest Places" to visit. Around the same time, the Fontainebleau announced that it would purchase five acres just south of the resort, previously occupied by a portion of the Riviera hotel-casino. The land would be used for future development. The $112 million sale was finalized at the end of 2024.

The Fontainebleau partnered with the 2024 Las Vegas Grand Prix to offer a $1 million luxury package for guests. It included round-trip transportation by private jet, admission to the race, a five-night stay in one of the resort's suites, and ownership of an Aston Martin Vanquish. The Fontainebleau also hosted an exhibit of 20 classic and modern Aston Martin vehicles leading up to the race.

== Features ==
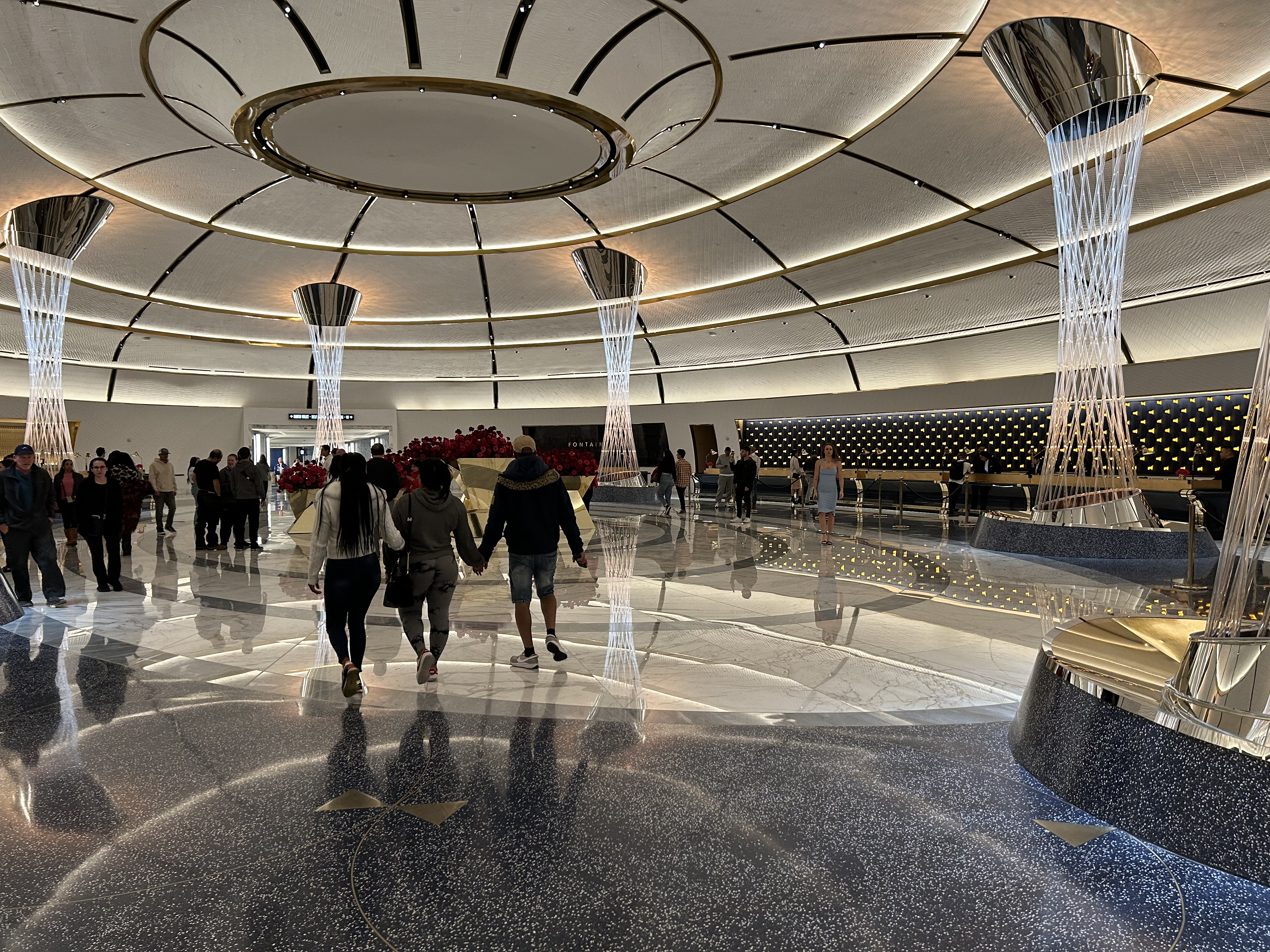
Hotel lobby

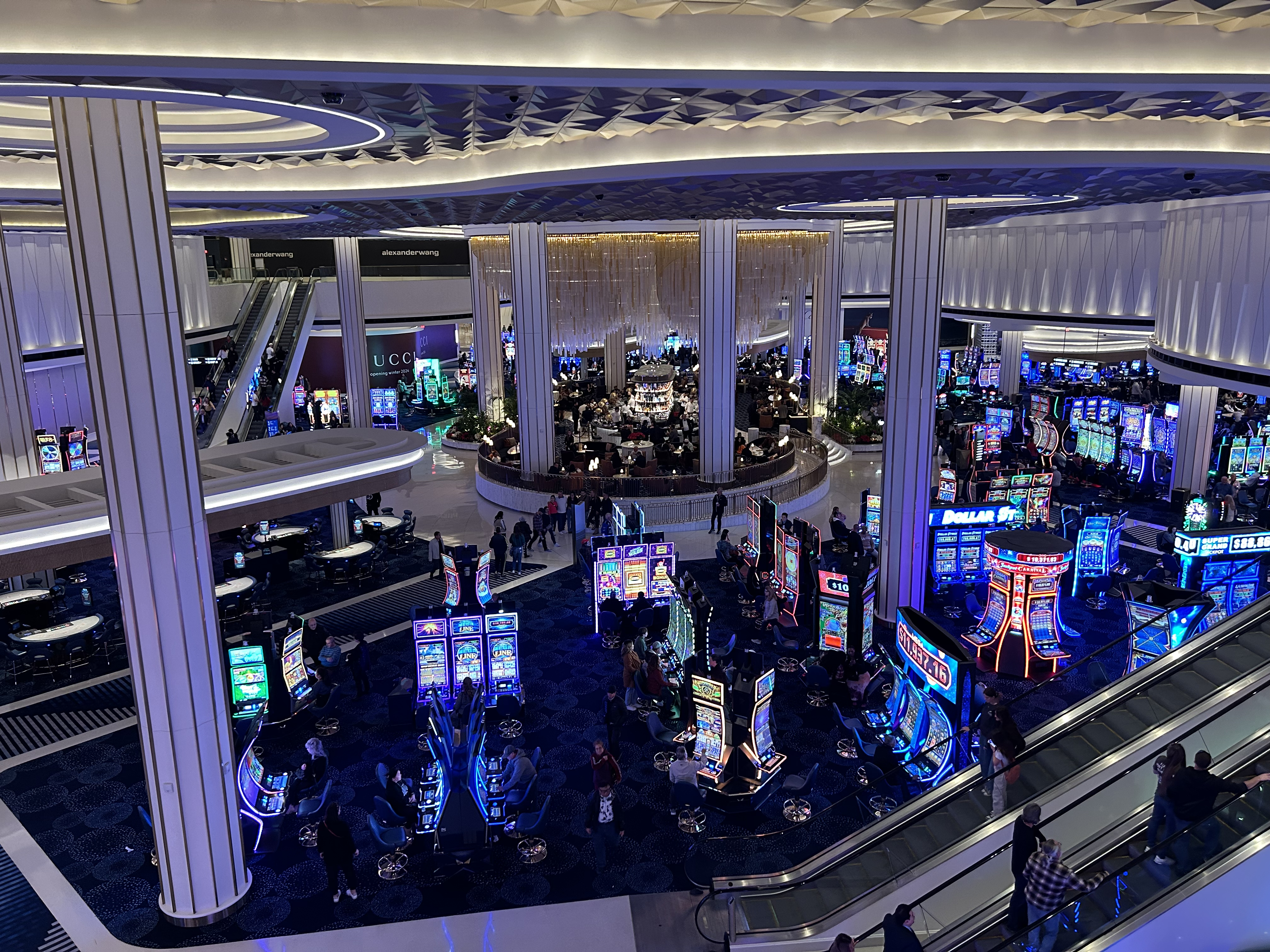
Overlooking the casino floor

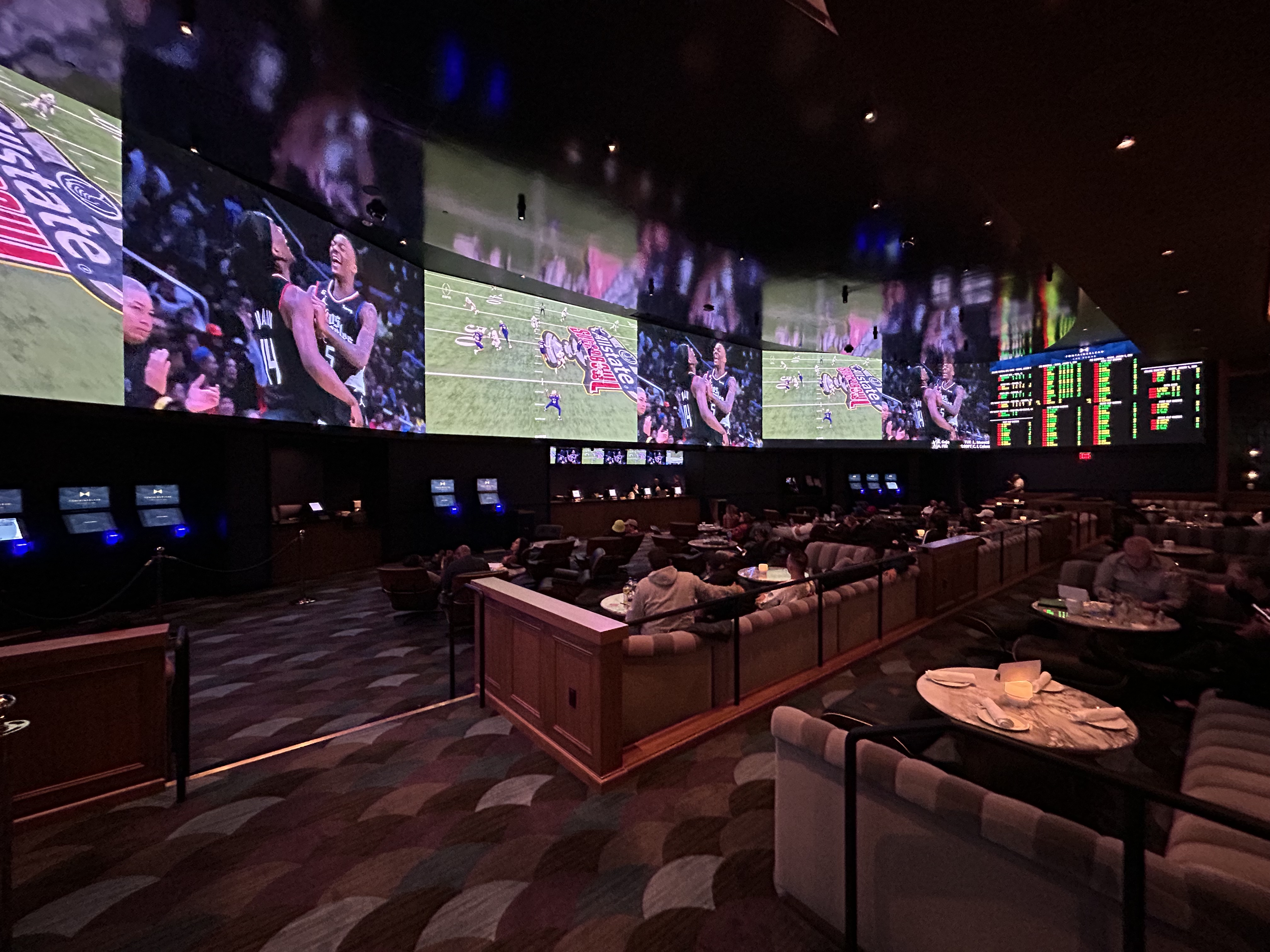
Sportsbook

The hotel tower rises 67 stories, standing at 737 feet (224.6 m). Since 2008, it has ranked as the tallest building in Nevada, excluding the nearby Strat observation tower. It is the second-tallest hotel building in the U.S. after 1717 Broadway in New York City. The hotel has 3,644 rooms, including the Fleur de Lis suites which occupy the top five floors.

The Fontainebleau features a 173,000 sq ft (16,100 m^{2}) casino, which includes 42-foot-high ceilings. The casino has 1,300 slot machines, 128 table games, 18,000 sq ft (1,700 m^{2}) of high-limit gaming, and a 14,000 sq ft (1,300 m^{2}) race and sports book.

Soffer expects much of the resort's revenue to come from non-gaming amenities, which include a 96,500 sq ft (8,970 m^{2}) retail area covering the first two floors. It features approximately 35 high-end retailers, including Chrome Hearts, Giuseppe Zanotti, and Missoni. The resort has a focus on conferences, taking advantage of its location near the Las Vegas Convention Center. The property itself also has more than 550,000 sq ft (51,000 m^{2}) of meeting space.

The resort shares numerous features with its sister property in Miami Beach, including a mid-century modern design. Bow tie designs are incorporated throughout the resort as a reference to the Miami hotel's architect, Morris Lapidus, who wore them regularly. Like the Miami resort, the Las Vegas Fontainebleau features a collection of artwork spread throughout the property, including pieces by artist Urs Fischer.

Like its sister property, the Fontainebleau also features the 55,000 sq ft (5,100 m^{2}) Lapis Spa, which offers 44 treatment rooms, a co-ed space with a cold plunge, a therapeutic salt room, and multiple pools. Guests can experience an Aufguss show - a communal spa experience that takes place within the sauna to music, lights, and essential oils. In 2025, Travel + Leisure named it among the 11 best spas on the Las Vegas Strip.

In June 2025, the resort opened the Hall of Excellence, a museum showcasing sports memorabilia and artifacts donated from the collections of Tom Brady, Jim Gray and others. Some of the 310 items include Jackie Robinson's 1947 bat from when he broke baseball's segregation barrier; the suit Elvis Presley wore when he signed the contract to perform in 1969 after an 8-year hiatus from live shows; and Oprah Winfrey's Presidential Medal of Freedom. The museum was designed by Fontainebleau executive Peter Arnell.

The Fontainebleau subterranean Vegas Loop car tunnel station was opened in February 2026.

=== Entertainment ===
The Fontainebleau emphasizes entertainment. It includes the 3,800-seat BleauLive Theater, measuring 90,000 sq ft (8,400 m^{2}). Paul Anka and Justin Timberlake performed in the venue during the resort's VIP opening. BleauLive debuted to the public on December 30, 2023, with singer Post Malone performing. The venue is operated by Live Nation and originally said to focus on touring acts rather than residencies. American rapper Pitbull began a residency show, titled Vegas After Dark, at the theater in 2024. BleauLive has also hosted Toto featuring Men at Work and Christopher Cross, as well as Keith Urban, Tears for Fears, Duran Duran, and Heart. After a nearly three-year hiatus, the American Music Awards resumed with a 2025 ceremony at BleauLive, marking the first time that Las Vegas hosted the event. On October 3, 2026, Real American Freestyle will present RAF 14 at the venue, an event that will be broadcast live on Fox Nation.

Nightclub owner David Grutman opened LIV, a club already present at the Miami Fontainebleau. The Las Vegas location opened a day after the resort, with John Summit as the first resident headliner. The club measures 50,000 sq ft (4,600 m^{2}), and includes the 35,000 sq ft (3,300 m^{2}) LIV Beach dayclub, which opened in 2024. The resort's pool complex measures 6 acres (2.4 ha) in total, and features seven pools. At the end of 2024, one of the pools was transformed into the largest ice-skating rink on the Las Vegas Strip. The opening ceremony included a tree-lighting with singer Thomas Rhett. The rink is scheduled to return in late 2025.

=== Restaurants and bars ===
The resort was planned to host 36 restaurants and bars, 15 of which did not debut with the resort. Eateries include the Asian restaurant Komodo and Papi Steak, both from Miami. Chef Gabriela Cámara oversees Cantina Contramar, designed by Frida Escobedo and featuring a Casa Dragones tequila tasting room. Chef Alan Yau opened two Chinese restaurants: Chyna Club and Washing Potato.

The American-style steakhouse, Don's Prime, was rated one of the best restaurants in Las Vegas by the Los Angeles Times and won "Best New Steakhouse" at the 2024 Eater Las Vegas Awards. The resort also includes La Fontaine, a French restaurant. A poolside restaurant, La Côte, also serves French Mediterranean cuisine. It was originally for hotel guests only, but opened to the general public in 2025. Another feature is the Promenade food hall with a variety of dining venues, including a burger restaurant by chef Josh Capon; El Bagel; Nona, which offers sandwiches; Miami Slice, offering pizza; Roadside Taco; and Bar Ito, a sushi bar.

Bleau Bar, a feature from the sister property in Miami, is also present at the Las Vegas location. Collins, another bar, is named after Collins Avenue where the Miami hotel is located.

ITO, not to be confused with Bar ITO, is an exclusive 12-seat omakase restaurant on the top floor of the hotel. There are two seatings nightly. Ito is located inside the Poodle Room, a members-only, poodle-themed bar. Photography and videos are strictly forbidden. To be admitted, visitors have to be invited by a member, have a reservation at Ito, or be staying in a Fleur de Lis suite.

== In media ==
The Fontainebleau is depicted in the 2014–15 television series Dominion, in which it has become a hydroponic farm known as the Agri-Tower. The talk show Live with Kelly and Mark also filmed at BleauLive in February 2024.

The Fontainebleau was shown in Season 4, Episode 3 of Hacks, which premiered on MAX on April 17th, 2025.

== See also ==
- List of tallest buildings in the United States
- List of largest hotels
- List of integrated resorts
- Landmark (hotel and casino), once the tallest building in Nevada; opened in 1969 after several years of delays
- Fontainebleau Miami Beach, sister property
