= El Rancho Hotel and Casino =

Historic hotel and casino in Las Vegas, Nevada

- Location within Las Vegas Strip Location within Nevada
- Interactive map of El Rancho Hotel and Casino
- Location: Winchester, Nevada, U.S.; 2755 South Las Vegas Boulevard; 36°8′15″N 115°9′32″W
- Opened: September 2, 1948
- Closed: July 6, 1992; 34 years ago
- Theme: Navajo (as Thunderbird); Western (as El Rancho)
- No. of rooms: List: 79 (1948) 206 (1950) 460 (1976) 385 (1977) 1,007 (1992)
- Gaming space: 90,000 sq ft (8,400 m^{2}) (as of 1990)
- Signature attractions: Thunderbird Downs horse track
- Notable restaurants: Joe's Oyster Bar
- Casino type: Land-based
- Owner: List: Marion Hicks (until 1961); Clifford A. Jones (until 1965); Joe Wells (until 1965); Del E. Webb Corporation (1965–72); Caesars World (1972–76); Tiger Investment Company (1976–82); Ed Torres (1982–93); Las Vegas Entertainment Network Inc. (1993–96); International Thoroughbred Breeders (1996–2000); Turnberry Associates (2000)
- Architect: Martin Stern Jr. (1965; 1980s)
- Previous names: Thunderbird (1948–77); Silverbird (1977–82)
- Renovated in: 1962–63, 1965, 1977, 1982, 1987–88

The El Rancho Hotel and Casino (formerly known as the Thunderbird and Silverbird) was a hotel and casino that operated on the Las Vegas Strip in Winchester, Nevada. It originally opened on September 2, 1948, as the Navajo-themed Thunderbird. At the time, it was owned by building developer Marion Hicks and Lieutenant Governor of Nevada Clifford A. Jones. A sister property, the Algiers Hotel, was opened south of the Thunderbird in 1953. During the mid-1950s, the state investigated to determine whether underworld Mafia figures held hidden interests in the resort. Hicks and Jones ultimately prevailed and kept their gaming licenses. Hicks died in 1961, and Joe Wells, another partner in the resort, took over his position as managing director. Wells added a horse racing track called Thunderbird Downs, located behind the resort. The Thunderbird hosted numerous entertainers and shows, including Flower Drum Song and South Pacific.

Business at the resort declined as ownership changed several times. In 1965, Wells and Jones sold the Thunderbird to Del E. Webb Corporation, which sold it to Caesars World in 1972. Caesars World planned to demolish the Thunderbird and construct a $150 million resort in its place, but the project was canceled because of a lack of financing. The Thunderbird was sold to Tiger Investment Company, which leased it to Major Riddle starting in 1977. Riddle renovated and expanded the resort and renamed it the Silverbird, hoping to reinvigorate it. After Riddle died in 1980, the Silverbird was taken over by his estate. The resort closed on December 3, 1981, after an auction failed to produce a buyer for the lease. Ed Torres subsequently purchased the Silverbird and reopened it as the El Rancho on August 31, 1982. The resort featured a western theme named after the original El Rancho Vegas across the street. Torres added a 13-story hotel tower in 1988.

The El Rancho closed on July 6, 1992, unable to compete with newer mega-resorts. It sat vacant for the next eight years while two companies made several failed attempts to reopen or replace the resort. A news investigation later found the decrepit buildings to violate health and safety regulations. Turnberry Associates purchased the El Rancho and its 20 acres in May 2000. The company had been developing the Turnberry Place high-rise condominiums on 15 acres behind the El Rancho. The closed resort was considered an eyesore for the new project, so Turnberry Associates had it demolished. The El Rancho's last remaining building, the 13-story hotel tower, was imploded on October 3, 2000. The former property of the El Rancho and Algiers later became the site of the Fontainebleau Las Vegas resort, after a prolonged a construction process that began in 2007 and opened on December 13, 2023, after repeated corporate funding/ownership and coronavirus pandemic setbacks.

== History ==
=== Thunderbird (1948–77) ===
The resort originally opened as the Thunderbird, owned by building developer Marion Hicks and Lieutenant Governor of Nevada Clifford A. Jones. Hicks had previously built the El Cortez hotel-casino, which opened in downtown Las Vegas in 1941. Joe Wells, the father of actress Dawn Wells, was also a partner in the Thunderbird. Originally known as the Nevada Ambassador, the hotel project was announced in March 1946. It would cost $1 million and be built on Highway 91 in the Las Vegas Valley, on what would later become the Las Vegas Strip. Construction was underway in October 1947.

The Thunderbird opened on September 2, 1948, with 79 hotel rooms, a casino, and a bar. The cost of construction exceeded $2 million. The Thunderbird was the fourth resort to open on the Strip and was located diagonally across the street from the El Rancho Vegas. It was named after the mythical Thunderbird creature, and the entrance featured two large, neon Thunderbird statues. The Thunderbird was considered a luxurious resort, and a Southwestern/Navajo theme was featured throughout the property, including portraits of American Indians.

In February 1949, there were plans to add a 78-room hotel addition for $750,000. The hotel had expanded to 206 rooms by 1950. In 1953, the Thunderbird opened the adjacent 110-room Algiers Hotel, built south of the resort. It served as a sister property to deal with the overflow of Thunderbird guests. In its early years, the Thunderbird was a popular meeting place for local politicians.

==== Alleged Mafia ties ====
In October 1954, articles in the Las Vegas Sun alleged that Jake and Meyer Lansky, both underworld Mafia figures, held hidden shares in the hotel. A state investigation was soon launched to determine whether the reports were true. The Thunderbird's complex ownership setup was questioned during a Nevada Tax Commission hearing later that month, part of the larger investigation into the resort's ownership. The property beneath the Thunderbird was owned by Bonanza Hotel, Inc, which operated the hotel portion and leased out other portions. Bonanza did not receive any of the resort's gaming revenue, and did not have stockholders. The casino, bars, and restaurants were operated by Thunderbird Hotel Company, of which Jones held an 11-percent interest. Hicks held 51-percent ownership of the resort. Both men denied that the Lanskys were involved in the Thunderbird.

Hank Greenspun, the publisher of the Las Vegas Sun, was a critic of Jones, who alleged that Greenspun was creating a "reign of terror" in southern Nevada: "No one is secure. You can't use your phone, you can't be seen with your friends for fear that will be ballooned into a sinister incident." At the end of 1954, the Thunderbird was ordered to show cause at a future hearing as to why its gaming license should not be revoked or suspended. The investigation continued into 1955, and another tax commission hearing was held that February, during which Jones criticized Greenspun. According to Jones, Greenspun was upset that the Thunderbird would not advertise in the Las Vegas Sun. Jones said that Greenspun had made repeated threats to run Hicks and himself out of town with his newspaper.

During construction of the Thunderbird, Hicks had received a loan from George Sadlo, a business associate of the Lanskys. Sadlo later assigned half of the loan to Jake Lansky, without informing Hicks. The investigation revealed that Hicks had made interest payments to Jake Lansky from 1951 to 1954. The tax commission perceived the loan as a hidden interest in the Thunderbird. On April 1, 1955, the commission ruled that Hicks and Jones had to dispose of their interest in the Thunderbird within two months. Otherwise, the resort's gaming license would be suspended. It was the first time in Nevada history that such strict action had been taken against a major casino operation. It was part of an effort by the state to prevent underworld involvement in gambling.

In May 1955, the Dallas-based Southwest Securities Company expressed interest in leasing the Thunderbird, although this did not come to fruition. Later in the month, Hicks and Jones won a temporary restraining order that blocked their ouster from the resort. The court action was filed on behalf of Thunderbird stockholders, including Hicks, Jones, and Wells. The Thunderbird continued to operate while both sides prepared for a legal battle over a permanent injunction.

Final arguments were underway in October 1955, as attorneys for the Thunderbird questioned current and former employees of the tax commission. Nevada Governor Charles H. Russell, also the chairman of the tax commission, had been running for re-election in 1954. The allegations against the Thunderbird had come to light a month before the election, and the hotel alleged that the timing of the claims was politically motivated, as one member of the tax commission had already known about the Sadlo loan years before the 1954 accusation.

In December 1955, Judge Merwyn H. Brown ruled in favor of the Thunderbird and issued a permanent injunction against the tax commission, stating that the commission should create and publish clear guidelines declaring what casino licensees require. He stated that any licensee "is surely entitled to know what is expected of him under the license obtained, and not be subject to annihilation upon an order of the commission based upon no substantial evidence in support of an alleged violation." Brown wrote that the tax commission exhibited an "unusual eagerness" to find wrongdoing against Hicks. He also cited a lack of evidence that Jones had any knowledge of the Sadlo loan.

Three months later, the tax commission filed a notice of appeal to the Supreme Court of Nevada. Both sides gave briefs to the supreme court at the end of 1956, and final arguments over the injunction were given several months later. In May 1957, the Nevada supreme court ruled that there was not sufficient evidence to revoke the Thunderbird gaming license. The court also ruled that Brown had acted in error, stating that casino owners shall not be entitled to continue operations under a district court injunction while they are appealing decisions by the tax commission. The commission chose not to pursue the matter any further.

==== Changes ====
Jones disposed of his gaming license in 1958, after purchasing a controlling interest in a Haitian casino. The tax commission had adopted a new regulation that prohibited Nevada gaming operators from owning interest in out-of-state casinos. Although Jones was no longer involved in the Thunderbird's gaming operations, he still maintained his ownership stake in the resort. The casino was closed in December 1960, for remodeling.

In May 1961, a group of businessmen agreed to lease the Thunderbird from Hicks after he was hospitalized. Hicks had been battling cancer for two years and owned 72 percent of the Thunderbird stock. The new group included Sid Wyman and two other men who had all previously been involved with the Riviera resort nearby. Plans to lease the Thunderbird were canceled in August 1961, as Hicks regained his health and wanted to maintain his control of the resort. He died the following month, at the age of 57. The casino was closed for seven hours so employees could attend Hicks' funeral, marking the second time it had ever been closed. Wells was named as the resort's new managing director, taking over for Hicks. Under Wells, the Thunderbird became heavily affiliated with sporting events such as wrestling and boxing. It also sponsored a deer-hunting contest.

Ground was broken on November 23, 1962, for a $1 million, four-story hotel addition, located directly east of the resort. It was the third phase of a $6 million project to expand and modernize the Thunderbird. At the time, the resort also operated 88 rooms at its Thunderbird West building, located on the El Rancho Vegas property and leased to the Thunderbird. Big Joe's Oyster Bar opened several months later; it resembled the interior of a ship, and fresh oysters were flown in to the restaurant daily from New Orleans. The four-story addition, with 205 rooms, was opened in November 1963. The expansion project was also supposed to include a skyscraper hotel building, approximately 17 stories with 350 rooms, to be built on the site of the hotel's pool area. It was to open in 1964, but it never materialized.

Wells was the president of the Nevada Racing Association. In 1962, he began operating the Thunderbird Speedway in Henderson, Nevada, a city located southeast of the resort. It held auto races for the next two years, and Wells wanted the Thunderbird hotel to serve as the lodging headquarters for racers. Wells also had plans to construct a Quarter Horse race track directly behind the Thunderbird. The track, known as Thunderbird Downs, opened in October 1963. It consisted of a three-eighths mile track, operated along Paradise Valley Road. It was successful, prompting relocation to a larger site in 1964. The new Thunderbird Downs was situated across the street, on property owned by Joe W. Brown that was previously used for the Las Vegas Park. In 1965, the Brown family sold the land. The Thunderbird Downs track was closed that November, and was demolished in early 1966, replaced by the Las Vegas Country Club. Thunderbird Downs was successful during its two-year run.

==== Del Webb ====
In September 1964, the Del E. Webb Corporation announced plans to purchase the Thunderbird from Wells and Jones through its subsidiary, Sahara-Nevada Corporation, which owned the nearby Sahara resort. The sale price was $9.5 million, and the purchase was approved by the state in January 1965. Two months later, plans were announced for a $1.5 million renovation that would include alterations to the facade. One of the Thunderbird statues was replaced by a larger version, and 400 feet of neon signage was added across the front of the building, spelling out the "Thunderbird" name with letters standing two stories tall. The renovation project also included the expansion of the casino, restaurants, and shops, and the construction of an Olympic-size swimming pool. Del E. Webb Construction Company handled the renovations, and Martin Stern Jr. was the architect. The new pool was the largest in Nevada, containing 360,000 gallons of water. The Thunderbird's convention and hotel facilities often handled overflow customers from the Sahara resort.

During 1965, a minority stockholder in the Thunderbird sued Wells, Jones, and others over a dispute regarding the Del Webb purchase. In 1966, Tom Hanley's union organization, the American Federation of Gaming and Casino Employes, alleged that Sahara and Thunderbird workers were harassed by management after trying to organize into a union. Table game dealers also filed a $100,000 lawsuit against the Thunderbird, alleging that the resort refused to pay them overtime wages. Picketing also took place in front of the Thunderbird, accusing the resort of antisemitism after the firing of a Jewish table game dealer, Howard Bock. Consolidated Casinos Corporation said Bock was fired because he dumped food on another dealer's head. Hanley alleged that Bock was fired because he was Jewish, and said that Bock was harassed by the other dealer because of his ethnicity. Hanley's attempt to unionize the Thunderbird and other casinos was defeated later in 1966, during a National Labor Relations Board election.

Business at the Thunderbird decreased following the Del Webb purchase and subsequent sales. In January 1967, Del Webb announced the sale of the Thunderbird for $13 million, to a group of businessmen known as Lance Inc. The state approved the sale three months later. At the end of 1967, Lance Inc. defaulted on its payments to Del Webb, and Consolidated Casinos was granted temporary approval by the state to take over the Thunderbird. In January 1968, Lance Inc. sought refinancing to take over the Thunderbird once again. The company owed an estimated $10 million to $14 million in debt, and a payment plan for its creditors was submitted. However, later that year, the company lost its battle to regain control of the Thunderbird, leaving it in Del Webb's ownership.

==== Caesars World ====
Aeroamerica flew this Boeing 720 under contract to Thunderbird in 1974

In July 1972, it was announced that Del Webb would sell the Thunderbird and surrounding acreage for $13.5 million to Caesars World, owner of the Caesars Palace resort on the Las Vegas Strip. The sale was approved later that year. Caesars World planned to build a new resort, the Mark Anthony, on the newly acquired property. The project was named after the Roman politician and general Mark Antony, and the resort would have served as a companion to Caesars Palace. The Mark Anthony would include a 2,000-room hotel, a casino, and a shopping complex. The Thunderbird would continue operations until the near-completion of the Mark Anthony. At the end of 1972, Caesars World planned approximately $500,000 in renovation work for the Thunderbird, believing it could bring in a profit before its planned demolition about two years later. The Thunderbird was operated by a Caesars World subsidiary called Paradise Road Hotel Corporation. After a global search, Caesars World was unable to find financing for the $150 million Mark Anthony project, and its cancellation was announced in June 1975. Caesars World initially stated that there was no intention of selling the Thunderbird, and that there were several plans in consideration for the property.

In 1976, Caesars World announced that it would sell the Thunderbird for $9 million to Tiger Investment Company, a group of Las Vegas bankers that included E. Parry Thomas. At the time, the hotel had 460 rooms. Joan Louise Siegel, a Las Vegas resident, filed a suit to block the sale. During 1975, she had made two offers to purchase the Thunderbird for $20 million, but was told that the resort was not for sale. A district court judge dismissed the suit, stating that Caesars World had no obligation to sell the resort to Siegel. Tiger Investment completed its purchase later in 1976. The sale agreement involved a leaseback, in which Caesars World continued to operate the resort while it was owned by Tiger Investment. The Thunderbird had presented Caesars World with significant financial losses.

=== Silverbird (1977–82) ===
In December 1976, Major Riddle planned to take over operations at the Thunderbird and rename it as the Silver Bird (later spelled "Silverbird"), consistent with two other casinos he owned in Las Vegas: the Silver Nugget and the Silver City Casino. At the time, the Thunderbird employed 500 people. Riddle planned a renovation of the resort, and had initially wanted to close the casino for the remodeling, before deciding to keep it open. The casino would be enlarged from 18,000 sq ft (1,700 m^{2}) to 53,000 sq ft (4,900 m^{2}), and a sportsbook would be added. A high-rise hotel building had also been planned, along with the enlargement of the coffee shop and keno lounge. Riddle's target clientele included local residents and tourists both looking for cheap food and "loose" slots. Riddle believed that the local market had been forgotten over the years as the Thunderbird continued to change ownership.

The name change took effect on January 1, 1977, and the property's roadside sign would be updated to reflect the new name, before being replaced entirely with a new sign the following year. Riddle changed the name of the resort because he believed that "Thunderbird" had become synonymous with "poor food and tight slot machines." Riddle leased the Silverbird from Tiger Investment, and operated it through his company, NLV Corporation. The renovation and expansion project took place throughout 1977. The expansion included a new 500-seat buffet, one of the largest in Las Vegas. Joe's Oyster Bar was also expanded, and the resort's showroom was renovated as well. Fifty-five hotel rooms were demolished to make room for the casino expansion, and other rooms were renovated. The hotel was reduced to 385 rooms.

In August 1977, a fire occurred in the hotel's four-story building, forcing the evacuation of its guests. A cigarette had been left behind by hotel guests in a second-floor room, catching a mattress on fire. The Silverbird suffered a two-alarm fire on March 3, 1981, when an arsonist lit up a dressing room under the showroom stage. The hotel was evacuated with no injuries, and only minimal damage was caused. However, 14 fire trucks responded because it was the third fire in four months to occur at local resorts.

Riddle died in 1980, and the Silverbird, along with his other casinos, was placed into his estate. The casinos filed for Chapter 11 bankruptcy later that year, and a reorganization effort failed to pay off the resort's creditors. An auction of the Silverbird lease was held on December 2, 1981, with a minimum bid of $3.8 million. The resort was worth approximately $2.5 million. Tiger Investment still owned the resort, and any new lessee would have to make monthly payments of approximately $264,000. Other lease expenditures for furniture and equipment would raise the monthly costs to approximately $500,000. Bob Stupak was among those who bid on the Silverbird, but no one bid the minimum amount. Eddy King, the chairman of record promotion company Star Makers Unlimited, offered the highest bid at $3.5 million. Last-minute efforts to negotiate a deal with King did not work out. As a result of the failed auction, the Silverbird was closed on December 3, 1981, at the order of a federal bankruptcy judge. The closure affected approximately 850 employees.

=== El Rancho (1982–92) ===
Two weeks after its closure, Ed Torres announced plans to purchase the Silverbird and its property from Tiger Investment. He intended to renovate the resort and reopen it by May 1982, and planned to add a hotel tower. Torres was the owner of the Aladdin hotel-casino on the Las Vegas Strip, and was also the father of swimmer Dara Torres. Ed Torres knew notorious crime members such as Meyer Lansky and Vincent Alo, but this did not restrict him from acquiring a gaming license for the Silverbird property.

Torres' $25 million purchase was approved by the Nevada Gaming Commission in April 1982. Torres spent another $25 million to renovate the property before reopening it as the El Rancho on August 31, 1982. More than 1,000 people attended the opening. The resort was named after the original El Rancho Vegas. Like the earlier resort, the new El Rancho featured a western theme, including a facade of old-western town buildings. The new resort had a wooden interior accompanied by American Indian items, chandeliers, buffalo trophy heads, and western paintings.

Torres also added a 52-lane bowling alley. The western theme and bowling alley were part of an effort to attract families, a growing tourist demographic in Las Vegas. A new poker parlor was also added, but the planned hotel tower did not begin construction until several years later. The renovated resort was again designed by Stern, and it employed 1,400 people. The resort's 13-story hotel tower began construction in 1987, and was completed the following year, adding 580 rooms.

The El Rancho struggled in its final years because of the early 1990s recession, as well as competition from newly opened mega resorts in Las Vegas, specifically The Mirage (1989) and the Excalibur (1990). The latter took away some of the middle-class gamblers that the El Rancho had relied upon. Torres announced in May 1992 that the resort would close in two months, giving workers a mandated 60-day notice. At the time, Torres had been trying to sell the resort for $25–30 million, but was unsuccessful. The closure announcement came after the Culinary Workers Union voted against Torres' request for concessions. The El Rancho also owed gaming taxes for its 918 slot machines.

The bowling alley, sportsbook, and slot machines were shut down on June 30, 1992, and the rest of the resort ceased operations on July 6, 1992. The closure affected 324 employees. Workers blamed Torres for the closure, stating that there were years of disinterest and lack of promotion on his part. At the time of its closure, the El Rancho occupied 20 acres. It had a 90,000 sq ft (8,400 m^{2}) casino, 1,007 hotel rooms, and four restaurants. The adjacent Algiers Hotel continued to operate for the next 12 years.

=== Failed projects (1992–99) ===
By August 1993, Las Vegas Entertainment Network Inc. (LVEN), a Los Angeles-based television production company, had plans to redevelop the resort and reopen it in 1994 as El Rancho's Countryland USA. The new resort would have included a family-oriented theme park with country-style entertainment and attractions. LVEN also planned to construct two 20-story hotel towers meant to resemble a gigantic pair of Western-style boots. The new towers would have brought the El Rancho up to a total of 2,001 hotel rooms. Harry Wald, the former president and chief operating officer of Caesars Palace, was to direct the redevelopment of the El Rancho into a full-time family resort. LVEN purchased the property in November 1993, for $36.5 million.

By January 1994, LVEN planned to open El Rancho's Countryland USA with its own 24-hour cable television channel based inside the new resort, which would have housed facilities for production and broadcasting. The channel would have promoted events at Countryland USA, as well as other resorts. LVEN also planned to add a country-themed shopping mall and a rodeo production facility to the new resort. Construction of the new hotel towers was delayed because of a lack of financing. In October 1994, LVEN received $35 million from a Dallas investment bank for construction of the towers. At that time, LVEN also planned to launch the Las Vegas Country Television Network, which would have featured country-western entertainment and other shows on the Las Vegas Strip.

In January 1996, Orion Casino Corporation purchased the El Rancho from LVEN for $43.5 million. Orion Casino Corporation was a newly formed Nevada subsidiary of International Thoroughbred Breeders (ITB), a New Jersey racetrack operator founded by Robert E. Brennan, who had previously organized a penny stock scheme. A month after the purchase, ITB announced plans to demolish the El Rancho and construct Starship Orion, a $1 billion hotel, casino, entertainment and retail complex with an outer space theme, covering 5.4 million square feet. The resort was to include seven separately owned casinos, with each one being approximately 30,000 sq ft (2,800 m^{2}). Individual partners would each contribute up to $100 million to own and operate a casino within the complex. Orion Casino Corporation would own and operate one of the seven casinos. The complex would include 300,000 sq ft (28,000 m^{2}) of retail space, as well as 2,400 hotel rooms and a 65-story hotel tower. ITB hoped to begin construction later in 1996, with a planned opening date of April 1998. Some gaming analysts expressed skepticism that the Starship Orion project could get built, citing the high cost and ITB's lack of casino experience.

In an agreement with LVEN, ITB was to come up with financing for Starship Orion, with a deadline of October 25, 1996. If ITB were unsuccessful, LVEN had an option to seek alternative financing for a less-expensive project, such as re-opening the El Rancho. A week before the deadline, ITB told LVEN that the Starship Orion project had not generated any financing from potential investors. ITB was pursuing other possible options for the property at that time. ITB and LVEN subsequently got into a dispute regarding control of the El Rancho. In addition, Brennan was ordered by the New Jersey Casino Control Commission to sell his shares of ITB, as he had been fined $71.5 million for securities fraud in 1995.

In January 1997, Brennan sold his interest in ITB to New Mexico businessman Nunzio DeSantis and former politician Tony Coelho, who were unable to make any progress on plans for the property. ITB had plans for a $100 million renovation of the El Rancho, which they planned to reopen as Countryland USA. The new resort would have included a 1,700-room hotel and a 100,000 sq ft (9,300 m^{2}) casino. In February 1997, ITB and LVEN settled their dispute, while the resort was expected to reopen in the first quarter of 1998. However, Coelho and DeSantis feuded with ITB board members who allegedly were trying to help Brennan retain control of the company. SunAmerica, the prospective underwriter for Countryland USA, subsequently chose not to proceed with its $100 million investment, out of concerns over the project and management. Ultimately, ITB stated that it was unable to raise financing for Countryland USA.

At the end of 1997, Turnberry Associates purchased the 15-acre parcel behind the El Rancho, where Thunderbird Downs had previously operated. The company began developing the Turnberry Place condominium towers on the site, located directly east of the El Rancho. By June 1999, a partner company of LVEN was considering a purchase of the El Rancho, with plans to renovate it at a cost of $354 million. Ultimately, the sale did not proceed.

=== Investigation and demolition (1999–2000) ===
In the years that it sat vacant, the El Rancho had come to be widely considered as the city's worst eyesore. In 1999, local news channel KVBC News 3 was granted access to the El Rancho after being invited by two unnamed workers. KVBC conducted and aired an investigation of the resort's structures. Asbestos and exposed wiring were found throughout the buildings, as well as corroding chemicals which covered the floors. Rats and bugs were found to be inhabiting the resort. Homeless people had also been sneaking inside the closed resort and staying there, and marijuana and empty beer bottles were discovered by the news team. While most of the structures were decomposing, another section of the El Rancho was found to have been renovated with working slot machines, which had been lent to the owners by Bally Gaming three years earlier to showcase to potential investors for the Countryland USA project. After the investigation aired, the property's owners were fined for health and safety violations by the local building and fire departments, as well as the Occupational Safety and Health Administration. In addition, LVEN was subsequently investigated by the FBI and the U.S. Securities and Exchange Commission for alleged stock scams and investor fraud.

In February 2000, Turnberry Associates acquired a six-month option to purchase the El Rancho from ITB. Two months later, Turnberry agreed to the purchase with plans to demolish the El Rancho. Turnberry considered the resort an eyesore and wanted to remove it for future residents of Turnberry Place ahead of its opening. The sale was finalized in May 2000, at a cost of $45 million. Turnberry considered eventually building a hotel-casino or timeshares on the El Rancho property.

A sale of the El Rancho's contents was held beginning on June 1, 2000, but was initially restricted to the first two floors because of safety concerns regarding other areas of the resort. Much clean-up work had to be done to the resort to prepare it for the sale, removing dust and disrepair. Among the items for sale were furnishings, bathroom fixtures, and carpeting. The bowling alley was also for sale, at a cost of $114,000. Other items for sale included 900 televisions and full-sized horse replicas. Gaming equipment was not part of the sale, having been removed by ITB prior to the Turnberry purchase.

Demolition began in August 2000. The resort's last remaining structure, the 13-story hotel tower, was imploded on October 3, 2000, with 700 pounds of dynamite. The implosion took place at 2:30 a.m., and more than 2,000 spectators came to witness it. For safety reasons, the demolition was a subdued event compared to past implosions in Las Vegas. Turnberry had given only minimal publicity to the implosion, in order to minimize the number of spectators. Police officers were brought on to keep crowds at a safe distance. The Algiers Hotel was covered in plastic to protect it against dust from the implosion, and it did not have any hotel guests at the time.

Site cleanup for the demolition debris was expected to take two months. Approximately 10,000 pounds of concrete from the demolished resort was used by the Southern Nevada Water Authority and the Las Vegas Wash Coordination Committee to stabilize the Las Vegas Wash. The El Rancho's implosion was recorded and featured in the 2004 National Geographic Channel documentary Exploding Las Vegas, along with several other Las Vegas casino implosions.

Turnberry initially planned to build a London-themed resort on the El Rancho land, but the project was later canceled. The site of the El Rancho and Algiers was later used for the Fontainebleau Las Vegas resort, which began construction in 2007. The resort opened on December 13, 2023, following construction delays.

== Entertainers ==
Patti Page's first Las Vegas performance took place at the Thunderbird in 1948. Nat King Cole was also a frequent entertainer at the Thunderbird. Other notable performers included Donald O'Connor, Mel Tormé, Rosemary Clooney, James Melton, Bunny Briggs, Rex Allen, Henny Youngman, Margaret Whiting, Peggy Lee, and Judy Garland. Two albums were recorded at the Thunderbird and were released in 1963: Caught in the Act, Vol. 2 by Frances Faye, and At The Las Vegas Thunderbird by Gloria Lynne.

The Thunderbird offered numerous shows throughout its history. In the late 1950s, The Kim Sisters were among 35 cast members who performed in the resort's China Doll Revue. In 1959, the Thunderbird launched a partially nude ice show known as Ecstasy on Ice. Flower Drum Song opened in December 1961, and proved to be a success. The show was initially only signed for a few weeks, but ultimately ran for nearly a year before being replaced by South Pacific. Flower Drum Song had attracted more than 360,000 people over the course of its run, and South Pacific was also well received.

South Pacific closed in 1963, and was replaced by a summer engagement of Flower Drum Song, marking its return to the Thunderbird theatre. The show's run was again extended, until the end of 1963, followed by the launch of Ziegfeld Follies in 1964. Two years later, the resort's Continental Theatre hosted Bottoms Up, becoming the only afternoon entertainment on the Las Vegas Strip. The Thunderbird later hosted Thoroughly Modern Minsky, a show by Harold Minsky. Flower Drum Song returned for a third run in 1969.

In 1972, the Thunderbird launched Geisha'rella, a topless revue of Japanese women. In the mid-1970s, the resort hosted entertainers such as Cyd Charisse, Keely Smith, and Tony Martin. Redd Foxx was also a frequent performer, and he held his third wedding at the resort in 1976. A year later, the Silverbird launched a show titled Playgirls on Ice '77. The Continental Theatre had seating for 620 people at the time.

Ipi Tombi, a South African show, debuted at the Silverbird in 1979, but ended due to lack of popularity. In 1981, the financially struggling resort launched a show titled Feminine Touch. In 1990, Rodney Dangerfield opened a comedy club at the El Rancho known as Rodney's Place, which previously had an unsuccessful run at the Tropicana resort. The club presented a variety of comedians. It closed a year later, due to poor business.
