= Turnberry Place =

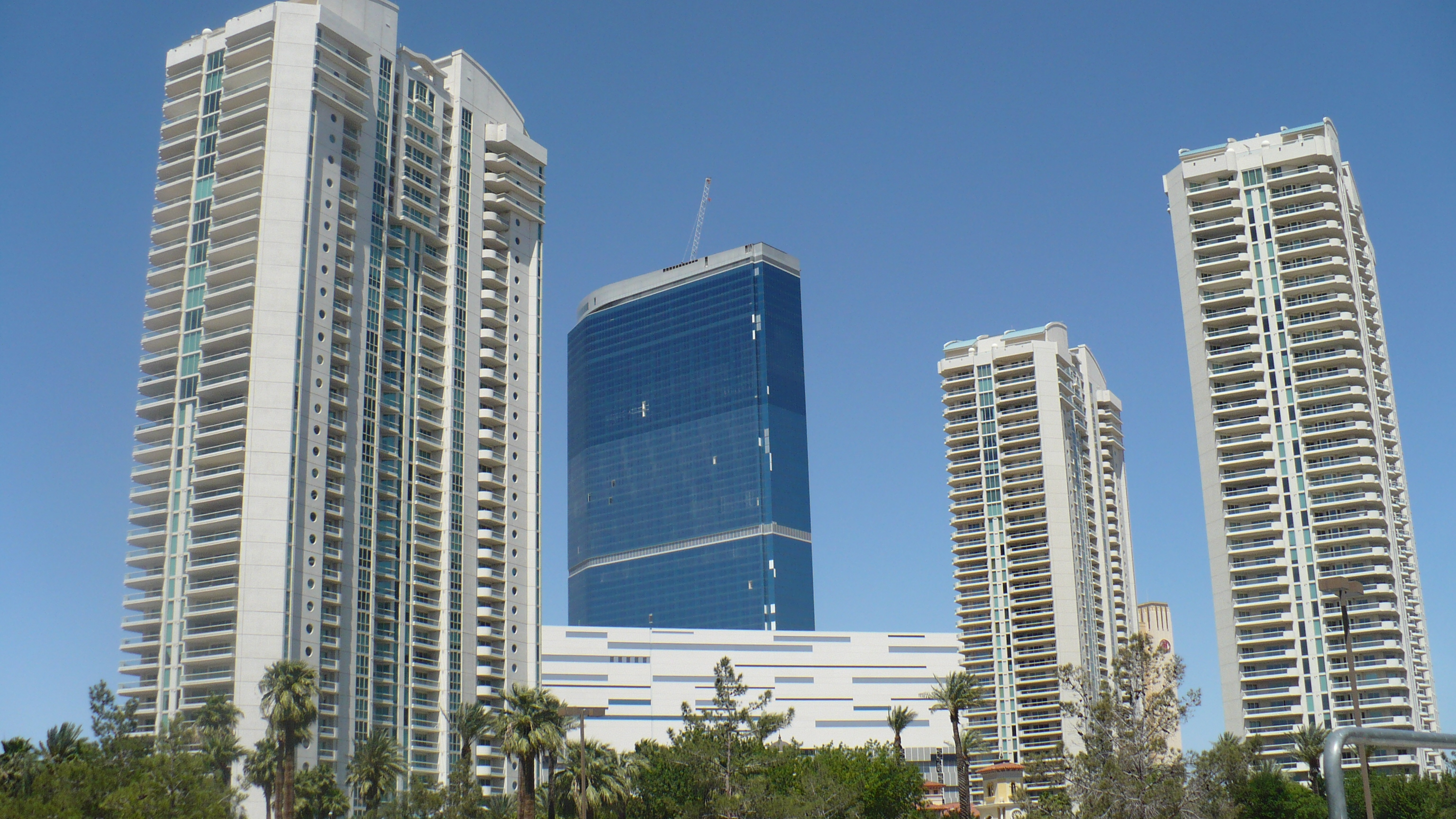
- Turnberry Place in 2010

General information
- Status: Completed
- Type: Residential
- Location: Winchester, Nevada, 2747 Paradise Road
- Coordinates: 36°8′15″N 115°9′22″W
- Construction started: August 1999
- Completed: 2001–06 (various towers)
- Opening: 2001 (first tower)
- Cost: $650 million
- Owner: Turnberry Associates
- Operator: Turnberry Associates

Height
- Height: 477 ft (145 m)

Technical details
- Floor count: 38

Design and construction
- Developer: Turnberry Associates

Other information
- Number of units: 720

Website
- www.turnberryplace.com

Turnberry Place is a luxury high-rise condominium complex near the Las Vegas Strip in Winchester, Nevada. It includes four, 38-story towers, each rising 477 ft (145 m). The complex also includes the 80,000 sq ft (7,400 m^{2}) Stirling Club, offering various amenities to residents and other members.

The project was proposed in 1998, by Turnberry Associates. Construction of the first tower began in August 1999. At the time, residential high-rises were largely non-existent in the Las Vegas Valley, and the project was considered a risky endeavor. However, upon completion of the first tower in 2001, Turnberry Place helped to inspire a condominium boom in the Las Vegas Valley. The subsequent towers were completed in 2002, 2004, and 2006.

== History ==
Turnberry Place is a $650 million complex, consisting of four 38-story condominium towers, each measuring 477 feet (145 m) in height. The complex has a total of 720 units, averaging 3,000 sq ft (280 m^{2}) each.

The property was once occupied in the 1960s by Thunderbird Downs, a horse racing track located behind the Thunderbird resort. Turnberry Associates purchased the vacant property, consisting of 15 acres (6.1 ha), in December 1997. The Turnberry Place project was announced in June 1998, and construction of the first tower began in August 1999. Unit prices ranged from $400,000 to nearly $6 million. The views from the towers were a top aspect of the project. Most of the units were sold to out-of-state buyers, mainly from Chicago, Miami, New York, and southern California. Most buyers were retirees over the age of 55.

The project was initially considered a risky endeavor. Residential high-rises were largely absent from the Las Vegas Valley at that time. Turnberry Place would be among the first such projects to be built in the area since Regency Towers in 1974.

The first tower neared completion at the end of 2000, and construction was already underway on the second tower. The first tower was completed in 2001, followed by the second tower a year later. Upon its opening, Turnberry Place and the nearby Park Towers inspired a condominium boom in the Las Vegas Valley.

Construction of the third tower began on June 24, 2002, and concluded in 2004.

A $4 million sales office was demolished in October 2004, allowing the fourth tower to be built in its place. Construction of the final tower was underway at the end of the year. It was topped off in January 2006, and all 180 units in the tower had been sold by that point. The final tower was completed later that year.

Notable residents have included Alan King, Robert B. Lewis, Joe and Betty Weider, James Caan, Rita Rudner, Lee Majors, Rachel Uchitel, Rich Little, and Andy Walmsley.

In 2018, a penthouse sold for $5.5 million, marking the highest-priced condo sale of the year.

=== Legal problems ===
In 2004, residents in the original tower filed a $21 million lawsuit against Turnberry Pavilion Partners, alleging construction defects. The lawsuit claimed that rain and wind intruded into the property, and owners in the third tower prepared to file a similar lawsuit.

The El Rancho resort, previously the Thunderbird, had closed in 1992 and was considered an eyesore, especially for the future residents of Turnberry Place. In 2000, Turnberry Associates purchased the El Rancho and demolished it. In 2005, the company announced plans to build the Fontainebleau resort on the former El Rancho property. Construction of the resort began in 2007, although residents took legal action against Turnberry Associates over the Fontainebleau's parking garage. The structure was built adjacent to Turnberry Place and it obscures the views from some residential units.

Jeffrey Soffer, the head of Turnberry Associates, said the company did a "respectful job" of building the Fontainebleau's hotel tower away from Turnberry Place residents. He also said the property was zoned for a hotel and casino, and that residents knew such a project would eventually be built on the site: "We're not going to buy a 20-acre property and leave it as a vacant lot. It's a property with proper zoning and nothing was ever promised. It's as simple as that. […] The bottom line is you can't please everyone." A judge ultimately ruled in favor of the Fontainebleau. Residents had also been concerned about the increased traffic that the Fontainebleau would bring to the area.

== Stirling Club ==
The 80,000 sq ft (7,400 m^{2}) Stirling Club was marketed as the centerpiece of Turnberry Place. The private club included a bar and lounge, a swimming pool and spa, tennis courts, a fitness center, and a cigar and wine room. It also had dining, including a restaurant by chef Charlie Palmer. The club frequently featured singers, and was a popular hangout for celebrities. Construction began in mid-2000. It was built on 3.3 acres, located in the center of the Turnberry Place complex. The Stirling Club cost $40 million to build. It opened in late 2001.

The club's operations were funded through $400 monthly HOA membership fees paid by Turnberry Place residents. The club suffered financial losses following the Great Recession, and it was eventually closed in May 2012, resulting in approximately 100 job losses. Turnberry Place residents accounted for 80 percent of the club's revenue. The club had 1,300 members, including non-residents who purchased memberships for $2,500. Turnberry Associates was unable to find an operator to continue running the Stirling Club. A prospective buyer, resident Steve Siegel, was unable to work out a deal with the HOA. Shortly after its closing, the club was put up for sale at a price of $18 million.

A group of Silicon Valley entrepreneurs, incorporated as JDLB LLC, purchased the club for more than $10 million in late 2013, with plans to eventually reopen it. However, the group lacked a clear vision for how to use the facility. JDLB never reopened the club, as the executives believed that trying to operate it would take away time from their jobs in Silicon Valley. The club was put up for sale in 2015, and again in 2017. A sale was finalized in 2018, to DK Hospitality, which paid nearly $12.4 million. The company planned to make various improvements to the aging facility. A new spa was added, along with a Starbucks and a high-end convenience store. Renovations were done on the pool, lounge, tennis courts, and event spaces. At the end of 2018, a New Year's Eve party was held to attract new members for the Stirling Club, ahead of its formal opening in 2019. The club was put up for sale again in 2024, at a price of $21 million.

== Access ==
The Turnberry Place Drive is closed to traffic at its intersection with Strecker Road. The city intended to turn it into a regular drive-through street, but residents opposed the project.

== See also ==
- List of tallest buildings in Las Vegas
