= Winchester, Nevada =

Unincorporated town in Nevada, US

- Census-designated place and unincorporated town
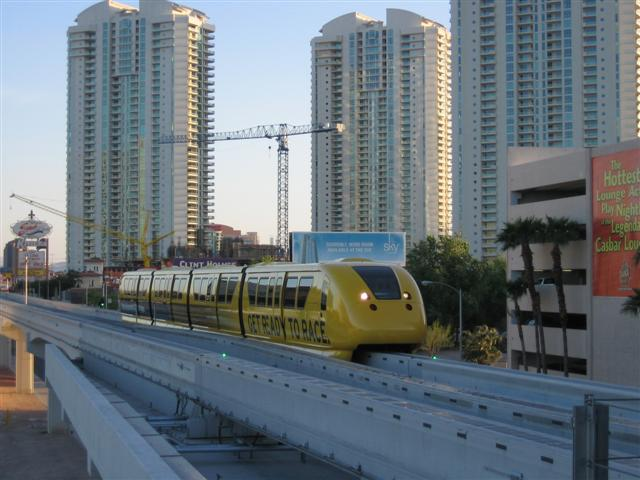
- Sahara Hotel Station of the monorail

- Location of Winchester in Clark County, Nevada
- Coordinates: 36°8′9″N 115°7′15″W
- Country: United States
- State: Nevada
- County: Clark
- Founded: April 23, 1951; 75 years ago
- Founder: Clark County Commission

Area
  - Total: 4.96 sq mi (12.84 km^{2})
  - Land: 4.96 sq mi (12.84 km^{2})
  - Water: 0 sq mi (0.00 km^{2})
- Elevation: 1,919 ft (585 m)

Population (2020)
  - Total: 36,403
  - Density: 7,341.7/sq mi (2,834.66/km^{2})
- Time zone: UTC−8 (PST)
  - Summer (DST): UTC−7 (PDT)
- Area codes: 702 and 725
- FIPS code: 32-84600
- GNIS feature ID: 0845753

Winchester is an unincorporated town and census-designated place (CDP) in Clark County, Nevada, United States that contains part of the Las Vegas Strip. It is one of a number of CDPs in the unincorporated urbanized area directly south of Las Vegas. The population was 36,403 at the 2020 census. It is governed by the Clark County Commission with advice from the Winchester Town Advisory Board. "Winchester, NV" does not appear in postal addresses; the United States Postal Service has assigned "Las Vegas, NV" as the place name for the ZIP codes containing Winchester.

== History ==
The southern part of the Las Vegas Valley was referred to as Paradise Valley as early as 1910, owing to a high water table that made the land particularly fertile for farming. County commissioners established a Paradise school district in 1914.

In 1950, mayor Ernie Cragin of Las Vegas sought to annex the Las Vegas Strip, which was unincorporated territory, in order to expand the city's tax base to fund his ambitious building agenda and pay down the city's rising debt. A group of casino executives, led by Gus Greenbaum of the Flamingo, lobbied the county commissioners for town status, which would prevent the city from annexing the land without the commission's approval. The commission voted to create the unincorporated town of Paradise on December 8, 1950. A month after its establishment, the town was expanded to include the residential areas of Paradise Valley. Months later, however, it was reported that county officials had determined that the town had not been properly established, because the petition for the town's formation had an insufficient number of signatures and because it had violated a state law forbidding formation of a town spanning multiple school districts. On August 20, 1951, county commissioners accepted petitions to create two new towns covering the area of the putative town. Town "A" of Paradise included the areas that lay within a Las Vegas school district, extending from the city limits to a point one mile south, while Town "B" included the areas within the Paradise school district. In 1953, Town A was renamed as Winchester, and Town B became known simply as Paradise. Ultimately, in 1956 state law consolidated all local school districts into a countywide school district, which in the Las Vegas Valley's case is the Clark County School District.

== Geography ==
Winchester sits in the east-central part of the Las Vegas Valley. To the north it borders Las Vegas, to the west and south is the CDP of Paradise, and to the east is Sunrise Manor.

Relative to streets, it is the area bordered by Sahara Avenue on the north, Boulder Highway on the east, Desert Inn Road on the south and the Union Pacific Railroad tracks on the west, with a few additional enclaves west of Interstate 15. The Strip casinos which are part of Winchester include the Sahara, Fontainebleau Las Vegas, Resorts World Las Vegas, Circus Circus, and the Westgate.

According to the United States Census Bureau, the CDP has a total area of 4.3 square miles (11 km^{2}), all land.

== Demographics ==
Historical population
Census	Pop.	Note	%±
1970	13,981		—
1980	19,728		41.1%
1990	23,365		18.4%
2000	26,958		15.4%
2010	27,978		3.8%
2020	36,403		30.1%

=== Racial and ethnic composition ===
Racial composition	2020	2010	2000
Hispanic or Latino	47.9%	44.6%	29.0%
White (Non-Hispanic)	26.2%	37.2%	54.9%
Black or African American	12.8%	7.8%	6.7%
American Indian or Alaska Native	0.4%	0.5%	0.7%
Asian	7.7%	6.8%	5.3%
Native Hawaiian or Other Pacific Islander	0.4%	0.5%	0.4%
Some other race	0.8%	0.1%	0.1%
Two or more races	3.9%	2.3%	2.9%

=== 2020 census ===
As of the 2020 census, Winchester had a population of 36,403. The median age was 37.6 years. 22.0% of residents were under the age of 18 and 13.8% of residents were 65 years of age or older. For every 100 females there were 105.6 males, and for every 100 females age 18 and over there were 106.8 males age 18 and over.

100.0% of residents lived in urban areas, while 0.0% lived in rural areas.

There were 15,110 households in Winchester, of which 26.7% had children under the age of 18 living in them. Of all households, 28.4% were married-couple households, 31.7% were households with a male householder and no spouse or partner present, and 30.3% were households with a female householder and no spouse or partner present. About 36.2% of all households were made up of individuals and 11.3% had someone living alone who was 65 years of age or older.

There were 17,356 housing units, of which 12.9% were vacant. The homeowner vacancy rate was 2.1% and the rental vacancy rate was 10.0%.

Racial composition as of the 2020 census
Race	Number	Percent
White	11,801	32.4%
Black or African American	4,876	13.4%
American Indian and Alaska Native	536	1.5%
Asian	2,867	7.9%
Native Hawaiian and Other Pacific Islander	189	0.5%
Some other race	10,154	27.9%
Two or more races	5,980	16.4%
Hispanic or Latino (of any race)	17,421	47.9%

=== 2000 census ===
At the 2000 census, there were 26,958 people, 11,986 households, and 6,052 families living in the CDP. The population density was 6,253.2 inhabitants per square mile (2,414.4/km^{2}). There were 13,535 housing units at an average density of 3,139.6 units per square mile (1,212.2 units/km^{2}).

Of the 11,986 households, 20.2% had children under the age of 18 living with them, 33.3% were married couples living together, 11.7% had a female householder with no husband present, and 49.5% were non-families. 38.7% of households were one person and 14.3% were one person aged 65 or older. The average household size was 2.24 and the average family size was 3.01.

The age distribution was 19.8% under the age of 18, 9.0% from 18 to 24, 29.2% from 25 to 44, 24.5% from 45 to 64, and 17.5% 65 or older. The median age was 40 years. For every 100 females, there were 106.4 males. For every 100 females age 18 and over, there were 105.7 males.

The median household income was $32,251 and the median family income was $39,451. Males had a median income of $27,886 versus $22,453 for females. The per capita income for the CDP was $20,615. About 11.4% of families and 14.0% of the population were below the poverty line, including 19.2% of those under age 18 and 8.5% of those age 65 or over.
