= Kendler =

Kendler is a surname. Notable people with the surname include:

- Howard H. Kendler (1919–2011), American psychologist
- Jenny Kendler (born 1980), American artist, activist, and naturalist
- Kenneth Kendler (born 1950), American psychiatrist
- Tracy Kendler (1918–2001), American psychologist
