= Audiotransparent =

Dutch indie pop band

- Origin: Groningen, Netherlands
- Genres: Indie pop, post-rock, pop, folk
- Years active: 2002–present
- Labels: LVR, Katzwijm
- Members: Bart Looman; Wessel Spijkerman; Gijs van Veldhuizen; Andreas Willemse; Chris van der Ploeg
- Past members: Jan-Willem Wools; Evert-Jan Luchies; Wouter Touw; Michel Weber
- Website: audiotransparent.bandcamp.com

Audiotransparent is a Dutch indie pop band, influenced from several genres, including American, pop and rock. This band was formed in 2002 but they made their debut in 2003, with their self-titled album Audiotransparent, and received positive reviews.

In 2005, they released their second album, nevland. It was named after the Norwegian striker Erik Nevland, who played for FC Groningen until 2008. There were some changes in their line-up before it was finally released.

After two years of recording in a fully analog studio, their third album, Chekhov Guns was finally released in 2009. With all habits and rules overthrown, the band tried to focus on what was best for their upcoming album. The band members faced several issues; ending friendships, relationships and cancer; which formed the leading themes for their songs.

As of 2005 (after releasing nevland), their line-up features: Bart Looman, lead vocalist, guitarist, bassist; Michel Weber, drummer; Gijs van Veldhuizen, guitarist, synthesizer and sampler; Andreas Willemse, keyboardist, synthesizer and violinist, and Chris van der Ploeg, guitarist.

On stage, they are often supported by Hanneke Rolden on violin, Sebastiaan Wiering (who also performs with Chris van der Ploeg and Gijs van Veldhuizen in Kendler) on cello and Rogier Vroom on trumpet.

== Collaboration and side projects ==
Bart Looman plays the bass during live shows of At the close of every day and is a singer and guitarist in The Fire Harvest. Andreas Willemse has performed with, among others, Lawn, and is a member of Utrecht-based Novack. Michel Weber is a former drummer of Benjamin B. Gijs van Veldhuizen is the frontman for Kendler, in which Chris van der Ploeg (guitar) and Sebastiaan Wiering (bass/cello) play as well. Chris is also performing solo as I Took Your Name. In the song "You are a movie", audiotransparent collaborates with Tony Dekker (vocals) and Erik Arnesen (banjo), who both play in the Canadian band Great Lake Swimmers.

== Discography ==
=== Singles ===
- "The Friday of our lives" - 3"-single - December 2005 - Livingroom Records
- "Hands & Fields" - 7"-split met We vs Death - September 2006 - Dutch Indie Singles Club
- "You are a movie/Never let her slip away" (Andrew Gold cover) - 7"-double-split with Great Lake Swimmers - April 2009 - Katzwijm Records/(Weewerk)

=== Albums ===
- Audiotransparent - September 2003 - Livingroom Records
- Nevland - September 2005 - Livingroom Records
- Chekhov Guns - November 2009 - Katzwijm Records/Excelsior/V2
