= Howard H. Kendler =

American psychologist

- Born: Howard Harvard Kendler; June 9, 1919; New York City, New York
- Died: February 17, 2011 (aged 91); Santa Barbara, California
- Education: Brooklyn College; University of Iowa
- Known for: Research on latent and discrimination learning
- Spouse: Tracy Kendler
- Children: Kenneth and Joel
- Scientific career
- Fields: Psychology
- Institutions: University of Colorado Boulder; New York University; University of California, Santa Barbara
- Thesis: An experimental investigation of the interaction between the hunger and thirst drives in the white rat (1943)
- Doctoral advisor: Kenneth Spence
- Other academic advisors: Solomon Asch; Abraham Maslow

Howard Harvard Kendler (June 9, 1919 — February 17, 2011) was an American psychologist who conducted research on latent and discrimination learning. He also published influential analyses of the theoretical and methodological foundations of modern psychology.

== Early life and education ==
Kendler was born on June 9, 1919, in New York City, New York. He studied psychology at Brooklyn College, where he worked as an assistant to Abraham Maslow and conducted a project on thinking under the supervision of Solomon Asch. During this time, Kendler became interested in Gestalt psychology, which prompted him to enroll at the University of Iowa in the hopes of working with Kurt Lewin. However, Kendler later changed his mind and chose to work with Kenneth Spence, under whose supervision Kendler received his Ph.D. from the University of Iowa in 1943.

== Academic career ==
He served in the United States Army during World War II and became a second lieutenant. He worked at Walter Reed General Hospital as a Clinical Psychologist. He then joined the faculty of the University of Colorado Boulder as an assistant professor after the University successfully persuaded the Army to discharge him. In 1948, he joined the faculty of New York University, where he became Professor of Psychology and Chair of the Department of Psychology at University College in 1951. In 1963, he joined the faculty of the University of California, Santa Barbara (UCSB). He was a fellow of the Center for Advanced Study in the Behavioral Sciences in 1969 and 1970, and served as president of the Western Psychological Association in 1971. He retired from the faculty of UCSB in 1990.

== Personal life and death ==
Kendler was married to Tracy Kendler (born Tracy Sylvia Seedman), who was also an academic psychologist. In addition to their marriage, the two collaborated on some of their research on discrimination learning. They had two sons: Kenneth and Joel. Howard and Tracy Kendler named their second son Kenneth after Kenneth Spence, the Ph.D. supervisor whom they had both shared. Howard Kendler died on February 17, 2011, in Santa Barbara, California.
