= Purposive behaviorism =

Purposive behaviorism, also known as cognitive behaviorism, is a branch of psychology that was introduced by Edward Tolman. It combines the study of behavior while also considering the purpose or goal of behavior. Tolman thought that learning developed from knowledge about the environment and how the organism relates to its environment. Tolman's goal was to identify the complex cognitive mechanisms and purposes that guided behavior. His theories on learning went against the traditionally accepted stimulus-response connections (see classical conditioning) at his time that had been proposed by other psychologists such as Edward Thorndike. Tolman disagreed with John B.Watson's behaviorism, so he initiated his own behaviorism, which became known as purposive behaviorism.

Tolman's purposive behaviorism focused on meaningful behavior, or molar behavior, such as kicking a ball. This focus was in contrast to simple muscle movements or molecular behavior such as flexing of the leg muscle. Tolman regarded the molecular behavior as fairly removed from human perceptual capacities for a meaningful analysis of behavior. This approach of Tolman's was first introduced in his book, Purposive Behavior in Animals and Men, published in 1932. To Tolman, it was obvious that all actions of behavior are goal-oriented, including those for animals. The main difference between other types of behaviorism and Tolman's purposive behaviorism is that in his view behavior is goal orientedas opposed to?.

== Tolman's cognitive maps ==
=== Tolman's experiment ===
Tolman's investigation used rats to represent clinical behaviors of men. He had the rats go through mazes. A hungry rat was put at the entrance of a maze, wandering through it until he gets to the food. In the maze, there are true segment paths and blind alleys. Trials for every rat reoccurred every 24 hours. The more trials the rats completed, the fewer errors, which he characterized by the rat avoiding the blind alleys.

A maze was used by Tolman in the following experiment: at point A, a hungry rat was placed as the starting point; point B was where the food for the rat was placed. The rat learned to get to B for food throughout the trials.

In these experiments, Tolman was looking at how the reinforcement in the trials contributed to the rat learning their way through the maze and to the food with fewer errors. Tolman's evaluation of these experiments led to his theory of latent learning.

=== Tolman's interpretation of the experiment ===
Tolman wondered what the rat had learned when he quickly discovered how to go through the maze to get to the food. Tolman believed that the rat had developed a cognitive map of his maze, with knowledge of where the food was located. With this research, he believed this experiment supported his notion that this learning was not rooted in stimulus-response connections but in the nervous system of sets which are to function like cognitive maps. Also, Tolman assumed that these cognitive maps vary from a narrow strip of variety to a broader, comprehensive variety. Tolman showed in his study that the rats exhibited a capability of latent learning. The results showed that the rats used problem solving because of the absence of reinforcement, which could not have been resolved by S-R representations.

Tolman's followers, also referred to as Tolmaniacs, developed a test to further support Tolman's findings and again refute the stimulus-response explanation of the experiment. Once a rat had learned to run from A to B, the starting point was changed from point A to point C. According to the stimulus-response theory, the rat has learned to simply move to the right in the A to B trials, so if the new starting point was C, the rat would go to D. In contrast, Tolman's cognitive map explanation predicted the rat would return to point B even if starting at the new point, C. The new tests supported Tolman's findings of a cognitive map, for the rat continued to reach point B.

== Tolman's published works on purposive behaviorism ==
From 1920 to 1928, Tolman published numerous articles in the Psychological Review that attempted to objectively define such concepts as instinct, consciousness, emotions, purpose, and cognition. Tolman coined the term "purposive behaviorism" when he published "Purposive Behavior in Animals and Men" (1932), which summarized these theoretical concepts and supported them with data he obtained from numerous studies. In this publication, Tolman argued that insight, or cognitive control of learning, was not restricted by evolutionary capabilities.

Like many other behaviorists in his time, he carried out these studies with rats, believing that "everything important in psychology can be investigated in essence through the continued experimental and theoretical analysis of the determiners of rat behavior at a choice point in a maze." In this book, he described purposive behavior as behavior directed toward some ultimate goal. Examples he gave of this kind of behavior were "a rat running a maze, a man driving home to dinner, a child hiding from a stranger, a woman gossiping over the telephone, etc." Tolman's purposive behaviorism was not as widely received in its day as other psychological theories. This was largely due to the fact that many did not consider its foundation to being in line with behaviorism at all, which was the dominating force in psychology at the time. However, the insistence on studying implicit mental concepts as opposed to looking solely at explicit behavior was an idea that opened the door to the school of cognitive psychology. While much work in purposive behaviorism was dismissed by the mainstream of psychologists in its time, many of Tolman's publications, most notably "Purposive Behavior in Animals and Men" and "Cognitive Maps in Rats and Men", continue to be cited in today's research.
