= Kenneth Kendler =

American psychiatrist (born 1950)

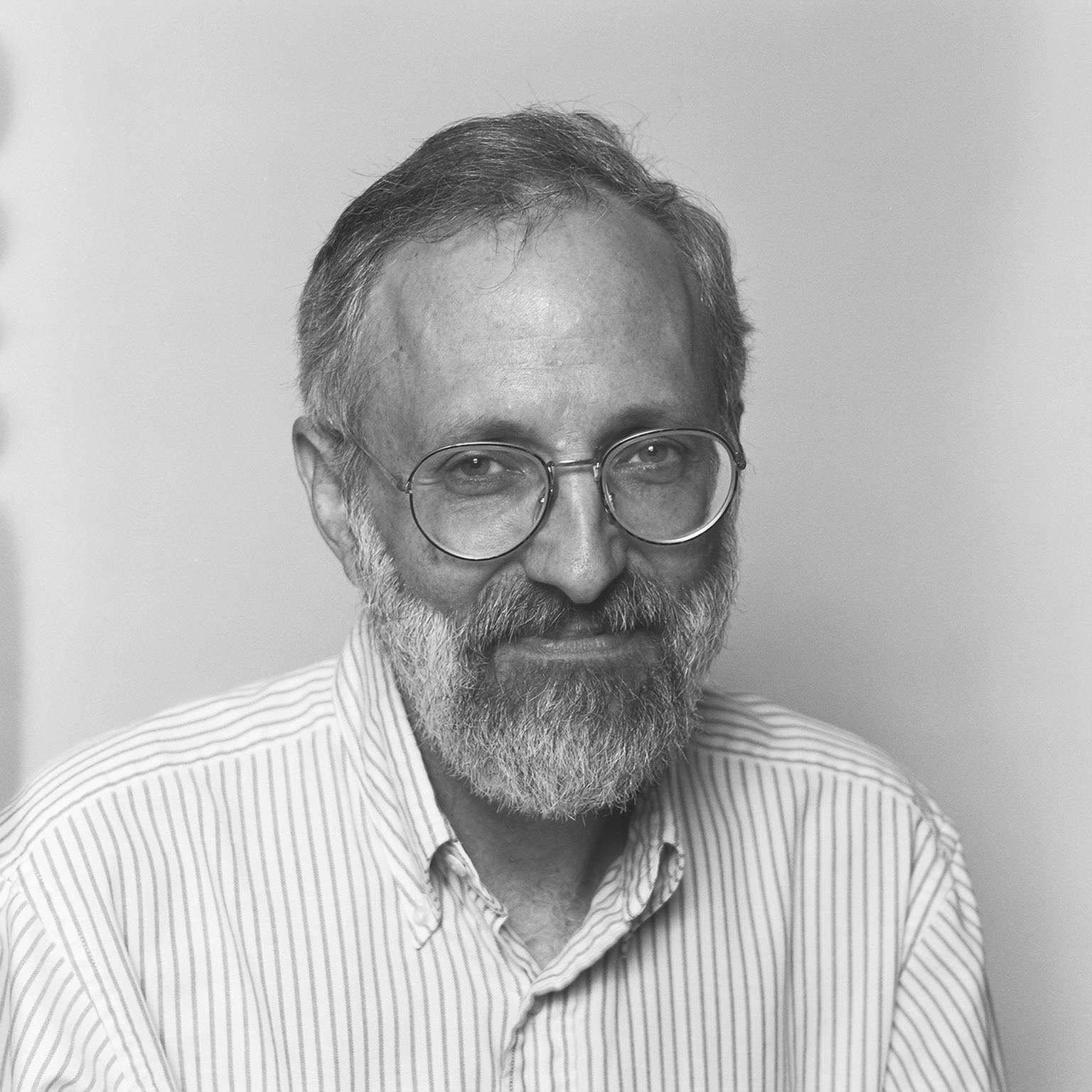
- Psychiatric Geneticist Kenneth Kendler
- Born: Kenneth S Kendler; July 12, 1950 (age 76); New York City, New York
- Citizenship: US
- Education: University of California, Santa Cruz, Stanford University School of Medicine, University of Birmingham, England
- Known for: Psychiatry, Schizophrenia, Behavior genetics, Major depressive disorder
- Awards: Joseph Zubin Award (2018)
- Scientific career
- Fields: Psychiatry
- Workplaces: Virginia Institute for Psychiatric and Behavioral Genetics
- Doctoral advisor: Lindon Eaves

Kenneth S. Kendler (born July 12, 1950) is an American psychiatrist best known for his pioneering research in psychiatric genetics, particularly the genetic causes of schizophrenia. Kendler is one of the highest cited psychiatry researchers. Between 1990 and 1998 he was the 2nd highest cited psychiatrist, and for the 1997–2007 decade he was ranked 4th by Thomson Reuters' Science Watch. He has authored over 1,200 papers and in 2016 his h-index was 126.

Kendler is a Banks Distinguished Professor of Psychiatry, Professor of Human Genetics, and Director of the Virginia Institute of Psychiatric and Behavioral Genetics at the Virginia Commonwealth University. Kendler is also one of the two Editors of Psychological Medicine. He served on the Work Group that revised the DSM-III, on the Task Force for DSM-IV, and on the DSM-5 Work Group for Mood Disorders.

Kendler is also interested in philosophical issues in psychiatry. Kendler co-wrote with Edith Zerbin-Rüdin, daughter of Nazi German psychiatrist Ernst Rüdin, a history of Ernst Rüdin's work during World War II. During World War II, Rüdin was a member of the Nazi Germany Expert Committee on Questions of Population and Racial Policy who vociferously advocated the extermination of individuals with schizophrenia. However, Kendler's articles on Rüdin have faced criticism for whitewashing his racist and later Nazi ideologies and activities. Kendler is a practicing Jew with a clinical practice wherein he has helped hundreds of schizophrenia patients.

Kendler is the second son of Howard H. Kendler and Tracy Kendler, both of whom were influential academic psychologists. They named their son Kenneth after Kenneth W. Spence, the doctoral advisor they both shared when studying at the University of Iowa. Kendler is married to Susan Miller, with whom he has three children.
