= Clark L. Hull =

American psychologist

Clark Leonard Hull
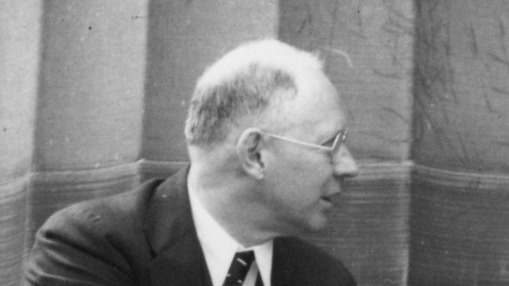
- Born: May 24, 1884; Akron, New York, U.S.
- Died: May 10, 1952 (aged 67); New Haven, Connecticut, U.S.
- Education: University of Michigan
- Scientific career
- Fields: Psychology
- Workplaces: University of Wisconsin; Yale University
- Thesis: Quantitative aspects of the evolution of concepts: an experimental study (1920)
- Doctoral advisor: Joseph Jastrow
- Doctoral students: Carl Hovland; Eleanor J. Gibson; John Dollard
- Other notable students: Kenneth Spence

Clark Leonard Hull (May 24, 1884 – May 10, 1952) was an American psychologist who sought to explain learning and motivation by scientific laws of behavior. Hull is known for his debates with Edward C. Tolman. He is also known for his work in drive theory.

Hull spent the mature part of his career at Yale University, where he was recruited by the president and former psychologist, James Rowland Angell. He performed research demonstrating that his theories could predict behavior. His most significant works were the Mathematico-Deductive Theory of Rote Learning (1940), and Principles of Behavior (1943), which established his analysis of animal learning and conditioning as the dominant learning theory of its time. Hull's model is expressed in biological terms: Organisms suffer deprivation; deprivation creates needs; needs activate drives; drives activate behavior; behavior is goal directed; achieving the goal has survival value.

He is perhaps best known for the "goal gradient" effect or hypothesis, wherein organisms spend disproportionate amounts of effort in the final stages of attainment of the object of drives. Due to the lack of popularity of behaviorism in modern contexts it is little referenced today or bracketed as obsolete(though more recent cognitive psychology research has found renewed support for goal-gradient like effects in effortful cognitive tasks). Nonetheless, a Review of General Psychology survey, published in 2002, ranked Hull as the 21st most cited psychologist of the 20th century.

== Early life ==
Hull was born in a log house in Akron, New York on May 24, 1884. He was born to a powerful father who was known to have a violent temper. His father was largely uneducated and married his mother, a shy woman from Connecticut, when she was 15. Clark's father didn't get a lot of schooling because his father worked a lot as a child, so he didn't learn how to read and was eventually taught by his wife. At the age of three or four, Hull and his family moved to a farm in Michigan. Here, he and his younger brother, Wayne, helped the farm by performing manual labor and chores around the house.

Hull was educated at a small, one room school in the village of Sickels where there were about twenty to thirty people. He often missed school to help work on the farm. He displayed an early proficiency for mathematics, but found grammar a bit difficult. When he was 11 or 12, he was forcibly converted by a religious group known as the Christian Crusaders. This experience caused him to rethink his religious identity, eventually renouncing religion entirely. At the age of 17, he passed a teacher's examination test and became a teacher in a similar small schoolhouse. A combination of his religious crisis and his experience teaching inspired him to seek further education. He attended a high school in west Saginaw County, living with the superintendent of schools in exchange for household chores. Hull's atheism almost caused the superintendent to kick him out, but his wife got him to reconsider. After completing high school, Hull left the superintendent, but kept in contact with him until his death.

== Higher education ==
After completing high school, Hull went on to study at Alma Academy. He continued to excel in mathematics, particularly geometry. His interest in geometry inspired him to begin thinking about how the mind can create new connections based on what is already known. It was during his time at Alma Academy that he read the works of Baruch Spinoza, whom he admired, though ultimately disagreed with. As he was about to graduate from the academy, he attended a banquet where the food was contaminated, and contracted a near deadly case of typhoid, which delayed his return to college. Many died during that time and Hull himself almost died. He was left with permanent amnesia and a general bad memory for names which affected him throughout the rest of his life. As his health improved, he returned to Alma College, where he studied math, physics, and chemistry, intending to become an engineer. His intent was to qualify for a mining engineering program at another institution.

After two years at Alma College, Hull moved to Hibbing, Minnesota to work as an apprentice mining engineer. However, after two months he was afflicted by polio, which left him paralyzed in one leg, causing him to recover at his parents home for a year and forcing him to reconsider his life path. He considered becoming a minister of Unitarianism, because he found their philosophy focused sermons appealing. His love of philosophy eventually led to his interest in psychology, which he studied during his recovery. He began his journey by reading William James' The Principles of Psychology. He also took a particular interest in the works of Watson and Pavlov. A little after he started reading, his eyes would become weak and his mother would read to him until his eyes became strong enough for him to read on his own. A year later, he decided to teach back home in the one room school, which had expanded to two rooms. After his two years teaching, he married Bertha Iutzi with very little money. After marrying Bertha Iutzi, they both began attending the University of Michigan. Here he began his formal study of psychology and graduated with his bachelor's degree in 1913. After teaching in Kentucky, Hull accepted a teaching assistant position at the University of Wisconsin under Joseph Jastrow in order to join their graduate program. While taking classes and working, he privately worked on research based on the evolution of concepts, which he later applied to his dissertation, "Quantitative Aspects of the Evolution of Concepts." After graduating, he spent some time working as a half-time assistant and eventually teaching as a full-time instructor at the University of Wisconsin before moving on to Yale.

== Career ==
In 1929 he began employment at Yale University, where he would serve as a Sterling Professor until his death. In addition to his other teachings, he was able to teach a psychological test and measurement course. Because he loved the mathematical portion of the course, he changed the class to aptitude testing, which focused on scientific basis of vocational guidance. On the side, Hull also conducted research to build a machine that could perform all the correlational work for him automatically. After teaching the aptitude testing class, Hull went on to teaching an introductory class for premedical students. While teaching this class he particularly took notice of suggestion and hypnosis. This was the starting point of his experimental testing in this field in which Hull focused on the quantitative methodology in experimental psychology. After ten years of in-depth research, he wrote the book Hypnosis and Suggestibility in 1933. After writing the book, he decided to continue in experimental field by teaching this course in addition to the premedical course. Hull had a great desire to teach this course and felt as though this specific type of science was the foundation of true psychology. In 1929 he was called to the Institute of Psychology at Yale University as a research professor of psychology where he worked on the problems concerning systematic behavior theory. In 1930, he came to several conclusions about psychology: the first was that he believed that psychology is a true natural science. The second was that its primary laws are expressed quantitatively by moderate number equations and that all complex behavior or single individuals will be derived as second laws. The third was that the primary laws with the behavior (based on the condition) can also be derived as quantitative laws from the same primary equation. he and other psychologists (Neal E. Miller, John Dollard, and O.H Mower) looked into these ideas more, they sought to understand what underlined conditioned reflex and behavior while also seeking to understand Freud and others like him. This eventually led to his work that he is primarily known for, Principles of Behavior.

== Death ==
He died on May 10, 1952, in New Haven, Connecticut.

== Research ==
Hull's primary interest was in theories of learning and behaviors that lead to learning. This was the goal of most of his research; in the end Hull created his own learning theory sometimes referred to as drive theory or systematic behavior theory. He also showed interest in hypnosis, but this was not his top priority in his work and research life. In both his drive theory and hypnosis research, Hull made sure that his experiments were under strict control. Also, in his work he emphasized quantitative data so everything could be analyzed more precisely, and less open to interpretation than previous studies on the topics.

=== Aptitude training ===
Hull began working in aptitude testing after he began teaching Daniel Starch's class at the University of Wisconsin. His interest in the field was stimulated by his dissatisfaction with contemporary tests, believing them to be lacking in procedure and validity. His book on the subject, Aptitude Testing (1928), showed his work with analyzing validity and creating scale scores. He also created his own test, the Wisconsin Lathe Test. He created a computing machine to lessen the work of producing tables of test correlations. The machine interpreted data from punch cards to produce these tables. This machine would later influence his theories on behaviorism. Hull eventually became cynical regarding the future of the field, causing him to pursue other interests. Though no longer doing active research in the field, he retained an interest, debating Karl Lashley's beliefs on the heritability of intelligence.

=== Hypnosis ===
Hull is often credited with having begun the modern study of hypnosis. He became interested in the field while taking over a pre-medical course on psychology from Jastrow. After successfully putting a disturbed student into a trance with a so-called "hypnotic crystal", he began to research the phenomenon and its medical applications. Dissatisfied with the unscientific nature of the field, Hull sought to bring greater academic rigor through measuring behavior instead of relying on self-reports. While teaching, he encouraged his students to do their research with hypnosis, teaching them the techniques involved.

His work Hypnosis and Suggestibility (1933) was a rigorous study of the phenomenon, using statistical and experimental analysis. Hull's studies demonstrated emphatically once and for all that hypnosis is not related to sleep ("hypnosis is not sleep, … it has no special relationship to sleep, and the whole concept of sleep when applied to hypnosis obscures the situation"). His research even goes as far as to say that hypnosis is the opposite of sleep, because he found that hypnosis gave responses linked to alertness rather than lethargy. In Hull's research, some of his subjects even felt that hypnotism made their sensitivity and alertness better. In fact, many of Hull's subjects in hypnotic states did believe that their senses had increased. They genuinely thought their senses were better, but this was never proven to be a significant result. The main question of Hull's study was to examine the veracity of the apparently extravagant claims of hypnotists, especially regarding extraordinary improvements of cognition or the senses by hypnosis.

Hull's research indicated that hypnotic states and waking states are the same, besides a few simple differences. One of these differences is that subjects in hypnotic states respond to suggestions more readily than those in a waking state. The only other notable difference is that Hull believed that those in hypnotic states were better able to remember events that had happened far in the subject's past. Other than those two differences, not much differentiated between waking and hypnotic states, according to Hull's controlled studies.

Hull's experiments showed the reality of some classical phenomena such as mentally induced pain reduction and apparent inhibition of memory recall. However, Hull's work indicated that these effects could be achieved without hypnosis being considered as a distinct state, but rather as a result of suggestion and motivation, which was a forerunner of the behavioral study of hypnosis. Similarly, moderate increases of certain physical capacities and changes to the threshold of sensory stimulation could be induced psychologically; attenuation effects could be especially dramatic.

After moving to Yale, his work in hypnosis quickly encountered resistance. The medical school's concern over the dangers of hypnosis caused him to discontinue his research.

=== Behavior ===
Clark Hull found inspiration for his own theory of learning after learning about Ivan Pavlov's idea of conditional reflexes, and Watson's system of behaviorism. He also was impacted by Edward Thorndike, as he adapted his theory to include and agree with Thorndike's law of effect. After Hull discovered his interest in learning theories from Pavlov, Watson, and Thorndike, he dedicated much of his own laboratory work to perfecting his own theory. Also, many experiments concerning his learning theory came from Hull's students, who carried out many different experiments in Hull's lab after finding inspiration from seminars and lectures in classes that Hull taught.

Quantification was a chief concern of Hull's studies, and he continued to apply this interest to behaviorism. While interested in the work of Watson, he was not entirely convinced. After listening to lectures by gestalt psychologist Kurt Koffka, he began to work towards a neobehaviorism. His goal was to determine the laws of behavior and how they can be used to determine future behaviors. His work with the computing machine led him to believe a machine could be built to replicate mental processes.

In his book, Principles of Behavior, he developed the following formula:

_{S}E_{R} = _{S}H_{R} × D × V × K

Where:
_{S}E_{R} is excitatory potential (likelihood that the organism would produce response r to stimulus s),
_{S}H_{R} is the habit strength (derived from previous conditioning trials),
D is drive strength (determined by, e.g., the hours of deprivation of food, water, etc.),
V is stimulus intensity dynamism (some stimuli will have greater influences than others, such as the lighting of a situation),
and K is incentive (how appealing the result of the action is).

A variety of other factors were gradually added to the formula to account for results not included by this simple function. Eventually the formula became:

_{S}E_{R} = V x D x K x J x _{S}H_{R} - I_{R} - _{S}I_{R} - _{S}O_{R} - _{S}I_{R}

such that I_{R} is reactive inhibition (inhibition caused by continual performance of a behavior that dissipates over time),
_{S}I_{R} is conditioned inhibition (inhibition caused by continual performance of a behavior that does not dissipate over time). _{S}L_{R} is Reaction threshold, the smallest amount of reinforcement that will produce learning.

Hull originally intended to make a trilogy of books on behavior, explaining social and cognitive behavior. Instead, he focused on continuously revising his original formula as exceptions showed up.

Hull's emphasis was on experimentation, an organized theory of learning, and the nature of habits, which he argued were associations between a stimulus and a response. Behaviors were influenced by goals that sought to satisfy primary drives—such as hunger, thirst, sex, and the avoidance of pain. His systematic behavior theory, also known as drive theory, is that of a reinforcement system, which means that in learning, habits are initially formed by reinforcing certain behaviors. Reinforcement of a response to a behavior supplies an effect that satisfies a need. In other words, this satisfaction of needs helps create habits out of behaviors. Specifically, Hull's theory posits that behaviors that satisfy needs, later described by Hull as cravings rather than needs, reduce these cravings. He called this concept drive-reduction, or drive-stimulus reduction.

Other behaviorists found Hull's theories to be too cumbersome for practical use, leading to his work to be eclipsed by Skinner.

== Influence ==
In 1936 Hull worked with students and associates and together they started a series of evening seminars that became known as "Monday Night Meetings". They would discuss topics such as conditioned reflexes, behavior laws, and Freud's psychoanalysis. These meetings became popular with many kinds of people, such as psychologists, sociologists, and anthropologists and sometimes as many as seventy people would attend. Later in life when Hull was in poor health, he had the help of his research assistants and volunteers to conduct his experiments. He also relied on people to keep him up to date on current discussions on current psychological experiments and theories that he was unable to attend and participate in.

Hull was one of the most frequently cited psychologists during the 1940s and 1950s. Aptitude Testing (1928) was a widely quoted textbook and his work Hypnosis and Suggestibility: An Experimental Approach (1933) was widely studied. Hull's Principles of Behavior (1943) was one of the most widely cited books in psychology. In an old Handbook of Experimental Psychology, his work was mentioned on over eighty pages, which was more than all other scientists at the time. In previous issues of the Journal of Experimental Psychology and the Psychological Review over forty percent of the bibliographies included one or more of his writings.

Hull advised and inspired a number of graduate students and psychologists that went on to revise his theories and make contributions to the field of psychology. Some of these important people influenced by Hull were Albert Bandura, Neal Miller, John Dollard, Kenneth Spence, and Janet Taylor Spence.

John Dollard taught anthropology, psychology and sociology at Yale and was interested in studying social class and specific learning experiences. Neal Miller studied under Hull at Yale, which is where he earned his Ph.D. Miller also founded the Laboratory of Physiological Psychology at Rockefeller University in New York, which is where he conducted research on animal training and this work helped to develop biofeedback. Miller and Dollard collaborated and developed a social learning theory that was successfully applied to psychotherapy and understanding. Their book, Social Learning and Imitation, listed the four fundamentals necessary for instrumental learning. These were drive, cue, response and reward and were based on Hull's drive reduction theory of learning. They used a similar construct to Hull's theory, however, they proposed that any strong stimulus could have motivating or drive properties without essentially being tied to the need of that particular organism. Their book, Personality and Psychotherapy (1950) is considered to be a very important book for it combined Hullian learning theory with psychoanalysis and helped to lay the foundation of cognitive behavioral therapy.

Kenneth Spence was one of the most well-known of Hull's graduate students. He developed and extended Hull's neo-behaviorist theory into what came to be called the Hull-Spence theory of conditioning, learning, and motivation. This theory states that people learn stimulus-response associations when a stimulus and response occur together, and reinforcement motivates the person to engage in the behavior and increases the occurrence of the learned behavior. Spence contributed to the study of incentive motivation and developing mathematical formulation and equations to describe learning acquisition. Spence attributed improvement in performance to motivational factors rather than the habit factors of Hull's theory. He believed that reinforcement was not always necessary for learning to occur and that people can learn through latent learning. He also developed a discrimination learning theory. His discrimination theory suggests that there are gradients of excitatory and inhibitory potential that are generated around the values of the stimulus that are either reinforced or not.

Janet Taylor Spence began her research while working as a graduate student with Kenneth Spence at the University of Iowa. Kenneth became her husband in 1960. Her research was on anxiety and was an extension of the Hull-Spence hypothesis. She studied anxiety as a dispositional trait, or "drive", which is the component of Hull's motivational theory. She predicted that people with higher anxiety levels would show higher levels of eyelid conditioning than those with lower levels of anxiety. Spence then developed her own instrument to measure her hypothesis, the Taylor Manifest Anxiety Scale. Her later research focused primarily on elaborating Hull's drive theory.

== Awards and recognition ==
Hull has been honored by a number of scientific societies. Hull was president of the American Psychological Association from 1935 to 1936. Hull was elected into the American Academy of Arts and Sciences in 1935 and also to the National Academy of Arts and Sciences in 1936. Hull received the Warren Medal during 1945 from the Society of Experimental Psychologists.

== Legacy ==
Hull's ideas were so appealing in part because of his professional background in engineering. He was very good with maths and numbers, and incorporated his numerical knowledge into the field of psychology. He followed the acceptable understanding of psychology at that time, and was influenced by the work and the conclusions of the pioneers of Behaviorism (Edward Thorndike, John B. Watson, and Ivan Pavlov).

However, Hull was able to add his own twist to understanding reinforcement and learning in a way that had never been done before by putting everything in numbers and equations. Hull was also influenced by Isaac Newton's work. Hull contributed to the motivation domain of psychology. He had quantified the Drive concept in an equation to prove that habit strength is a function of reinforcement.

Edward C. Tolman was a contemporary of Hull whose theory of learning was proved to be more logical and less complicated than Hull's work. Tolman showed that behavior is goal directed and not controlled by random drives and reinforcement. Tolman used maze experiments with rats to show that rats can learn without reinforcement and are better understood as directed by goals and driven by cognitive expectancies. This finding provided a serious challenge to much of Hull's learning theory.
