= SSHA =

- SS Main Office
- Social Science History Association
