= Western Psychological Association =

American psychology learned society

- Formation: 1921
- Type: Learned society
- Legal status: 501c3
- Purpose: Psychological research
- Location: California
- Region served: Western United States
- Members: 1,917 (1962)
- President: Patricia Flynn
- President-elect: Jason Siegel
- Past president: Gregory Feist
- Affiliations: American Psychological Association
- Website: westernpsych.org

The Western Psychological Association (abbreviated WPA) is an American learned society dedicated to the study of psychology and other behavioral sciences. It is a regional association focused on the Western United States, and is affiliated with the American Psychological Association. It promotes psychological research through an annual conference, which it has held since its founding, and where psychologists read their research papers to one another. Reports from these conferences were originally published in Psychological Bulletin starting in 1924, and are now published in American Psychologist.

== History ==
The Western Psychological Association was established in 1921 with fourteen members, and held its first meeting in August of that year. The meeting took place in Berkeley, California, and was held in conjunction with the Pacific division of the American Association for the Advancement of Science. At the meeting, members elected Lewis Terman and Edward Tolman as the Association's president and vice president, respectively. The organization's membership increased to 1,917 members by 1962.

=== Former presidents ===
- Frank A. Beach
- Robert A. Bjork
- Shepherd Ivory Franz
- Howard H. Kendler
- Tracy Kendler
- Eleanor Maccoby
- Jean Macfarlane
- Donald W. MacKinnon
- Christina Maslach
- Robert Pellegrini
- Leo Postman
