= Aaron Panofsky =

American sociologist of science

- Education: Amherst College (B.A., 1996); New York University (M.A., 2002; Ph.D., 2006)
- Known for: Sociology of scientific knowledge
- Awards: 2015 President’s Book Award from the Social Science History Association (for Misbehaving Science)
- Scientific career
- Fields: Sociology
- Institutions: University of California, Los Angeles
- Thesis: Fielding controversy: The genesis and structure of behavior genetics (2006)
- Doctoral advisors: Troy Duster; Craig Calhoun

Aaron Leon Panofsky is an American sociologist of science and Professor in Public Policy and the Institute for Society and Genetics at the University of California, Los Angeles. His research focuses on the social implications and history of genetics.

== Work ==
Panofsky's 2014 book, Misbehaving Science, explores the historical development and controversies of behavior genetics. The book won the 2015 President's Book Award from the Social Science History Association.

Panofsky also attracted media attention for a study he presented at an American Sociological Association meeting in 2017. The study analyzed 3,070 posts on the white nationalist Internet forum Stormfront in which posters described the results of their genetic ancestry tests. The study identified three distinct ways in which the white supremacists whose tests identified non-European ancestry dismissed and rationalized their results. One of these ways was to accuse the genetic testing companies of being run by Jews, who some white supremacists accused of engaging in a conspiracy to fraudulently manipulate the white supremacists' test results.
