= Kelly Overton (activist) =

American activist

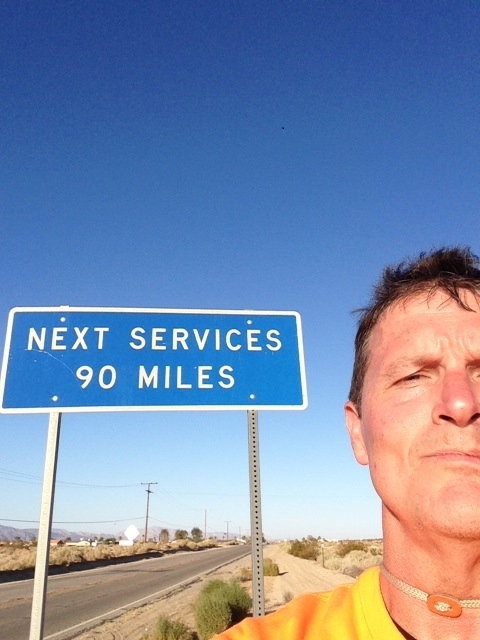
- Kelly Overton hiking the Mojave in July 2016.
- Born: Liberal, Kansas
- Occupation: Activist / Author

Kelly Overton is an author, activist and founder of Mojave Animal Protection (MAP) and Border Kindness.

== Education ==
Kelly Overton received a BA in Human Services Management from the University of Massachusetts Boston, an MPH in International Health and Development from Tulane University School of Public Health & Tropical Medicine in New Orleans, a graduate certificate in Conservation Biology from Columbia University's Center for Environmental Research and Conservation, and an MPA from Harvard University's John F Kennedy School of Government.

== Publication ==
His writings on humanity's mistreatment of animals have appeared in The Washington Post, Boston Herald, The Philadelphia Inquirer, Austin American-Statesman, The Buffalo News, The Baltimore Sun and CounterPunch.

Kelly Overton was a contributor with Tom Regan, Lee Hall and others to the 2008 Greenhaven Press Current Controversies text book The Rights of Animals (ISBN 9780737741476) and co-wrote (with Peter Singer) the Preface to the 2010 edition of Outlawed In Europe (Archimedean Press). In 2016, Kelly Overton: Animals, Culture & Cruelty a collection of his writings was a best selling eBook.

== Activism ==
In July 2016 Overton walked 200 miles from Joshua Tree, California to Las Vegas, Nevada to bring attention to the environmental protection needs of the Mojave Desert.

He curated Resistance As Art, an April 2017 exhibit of animal, environmental and ecological justice art works. The exhibit includes works by Sue Coe, Marina DeBris, Dana Ellyn, Jonathan Horowitz, Jenny Kendler, Andy Singer and Jess X. Snow.

In July 2018 Kelly Overton walked 100 miles between Palm Springs, California and Mexicali, Mexico to raise money for Refugee and Immigrant Center for Education and Legal Services and in protest of Trump administration family separation policy.

In September 2019 Overton curated Art Across Borders: A Migrating Exhibit for Border Kindness. The exhibit showed in Mexicali, Mexico and Los Angeles, California and included work created by Sue Coe, Ramiro Gomez and Jenny Kendler.

== See also ==
- List of animal rights advocates

== Sources ==
- Duke and Duchess of Sussex show backing for anti-Trump wall charity, The Telegraph
- Asylum seekers forced to wait in Mexico face daily threat of violence, PBS NewsHour
- Meghan Markle and Prince Harry are Following Just 17 Instagram Accounts for a Special Reason, People
- Trump's 'shameful' migrant stance condemns thousands to violent limbo in Mexico, The Guardian
- US is sending migrants back to Mexico. Thousands have missed a court date., CNN
- Asylum seekers report theft, exploitation in Mexicali's migrant shelters, The San Diego Union-Tribune
- Asylum seekers forced to 'remain in' Mexicali face long journey to court hearings, The San Diego Union-Tribune
- Heat and violence pose twin threats for asylum-seekers waiting at border NBC News
- Del Otro Lado De La Frontera KYMA Yuma
- After separation at the border months ago, some migrant families tearfully reunite, Los Angeles Times
- When Animals Suffer, So Do We, Washington Post
- Mexico – United States: A time bomb is forming on the border, Deutsche Welle
- Activist art rises across the desert, Desert Magazine
- Clinic Brings Dog Days to Nicaragua, Tico Times
- Send A Signal, Adopt A Mutt, Philadelphia Inquirer
- Stop Animal Testing, Baltimore Sun
- Michael Vick Proves Only Semi-Tough. Boston Herald
- Class Notes – Autumn 2011. Harvard Kennedy School Magazine
- Strong Men Protect Creatures That Are Vulnerable Buffalo News
- The Casualties Of Green Scare Counterpunch
- "Many Youngsters Learn Hunter Safety". Oakland Tribune. 22 September 2006. Archived from the original on 5 March 2009 – via FindArticles.
- A White Man's Survival Guide for Post Patriarchal America GirlieGirl Army
- The Obamas and the Million-Mutt March Counterpunch
- Animal Rights and Obama – Can He Build An Ark?, Counterpunch
- Ain't That Ruff Enough? Los Angeles Times
- Chimpanzees Deserve Our Compassion Austin American-Statesman
- Puerto Rico Aims to Trap Roaming Monkeys USA Today
- If There Is A Chimp Heaven Counterpunch
- Man finishes Joshua Tree-to-Vegas Hike for Mojave Awareness Desert Sun
- Man's extreme desert hike raising awareness for the Mojave Desert Sun
- The Rights of Animals Greenhaven Press
- "New Yorkers remain on call to rescue animals from Louisiana oil spill disaster". New York Daily News. 29 May 2010. Archived from the original on 23 June 2010.
- Oil Spill Aid Veg News magazine
- Art Queen Exhibit Resistance As Art Opens Tomorrow KCDZ 107.7
- Mendocino's Missing Cannabis Czar Goes For A Walk In The Desert KZYX – Mendocino County's Public and Community Radio
- Hundreds of Mendocino County cultivators in backlog limbo The Press Democrat
- Volunteer Says Personal Risks Worth Helping Immigrants KMIR – NBC Palm Springs
- Central American families to reunite with their children after being separated KYMA – Yuma
- Primera familia de migrantes en ingresar a los ee uu para ser reunida con sus hijos KYMA – Telemundo
- Black Luck Vintage brings good vibes and deals Hi Desert Star
- Border Kindness, activistas ayudan a inmigrantes en la frontera entre Mexicali y Caléxico Excelsior, Edicion Impresa, La Prensa
- Influx of migrant children being dropped off at Mexicali shelters KYMA – Yuma
- Migrants Wait In Mexicali NPR Weekend Edition Saturday – WBUR
- Albergue migrante en Mexicali recibe apoyo de organizacion estadounidense KYMA – Telemundo
