= Novack =

Novack is a surname. Notable people with the surname include:

- Ben Novack (1907–1985), American hotelier
- Bernice and Ben Novack Jr., American murder victims
- George Novack (1905–1992), American Marxist theoretician, editor, and activist
- Ken Novack, American lawyer
- Sandra Novack (born 1972), American writer of a novel and short stories
- Saul Novack (1918–1998), American professor and dean
- Shelly Novack (1944–1978), American college football player
