= Virginia Institute for Psychiatric and Behavioral Genetics =

US research center

The Virginia Institute for Psychiatric and Behavioral Genetics (abbreviated VIPBG) is a human genetics research center, located at Virginia Commonwealth University (VCU), that aims to study the role played by genetic factors in the etiology of psychiatric conditions and substance abuse.

== History ==
It was co-founded in 1996 by VCU psychiatry professors Kenneth Kendler and Lindon Eaves.

Kendler serves as the Institute's director and the director of its Psychiatric Genetics Research Program (abbreviated PGRP), while Eaves is the director of the Institute's Genetic Epidemiology Research Group (abbreviated GERG).

The PGRP and GERG are subsidiaries of the Department of Psychiatry and the Department of Human and Molecular Genetics, respectively, at the VCU School of Medicine. The Institute's associate director is Michael Neale.

== Recognition ==
In 2017, the Virginia General Assembly passed a bill commending Kendler and the VIPBG, describing the latter as "...an exciting, highly collaborative research environment with a strong record of funding, research, and training, including more than 140 predoctoral and postdoctoral students over the past decade".

== See also ==
- Misbehaving Science
