= Janet Taylor Spence =

American psychologist

Janet A. T. Spence
- Born: Janet Allison Taylor; August 29, 1923; Toledo, Ohio
- Died: March 16, 2015 (aged 91)
- Spouse: Kenneth Spence (m. 1960)
- Awards: APA Award for Lifetime Contributions to Psychology (2001)
- Scientific career
- Fields: Psychology
- Thesis: The Relationship of Anxiety to the Conditioned Eyelid Response (1949)
- Doctoral advisor: Kenneth Spence

Janet Allison Taylor Spence (August 29, 1923 – March 16, 2015) was an American psychologist who worked in the field of the psychology of anxiety and in gender studies.

== Early life ==
Spence was born on August 29, 1923, in Toledo, Ohio. She was the older of two daughters. Her sister was born in 1927. Her father, John Chrichton, and her mother, Helen Taylor, were both active members of their community. Janet Taylor Spence's parents met in New York where John was working as a reporter and Helen was studying for a master's degree in economics at Columbia University. John joined the school board after running for governor, and Helen worked with the League of Women Voters.

== Education ==
Spence received her undergraduate degree in Psychology at Oberlin College in 1945. The fall after finishing her bachelor's degree, she began a graduate program at Yale University, which she left for the New York Rotating Internship Program. It is here that she changed and better developed her interests from clinical practice to human behavior. She later transferred to the University of Iowa. Yale proved to be an important part of her life as it was where she met her future husband and co-creator of the Hull-Spence Hypothesis of discrimination learning, Kenneth Spence. While at the University of Iowa, she worked as his graduate student doing anxiety research. While attending Yale University as a clinical student, Spence worked under Clark L. Hull, the predominant learning theorist of his era.

An extension of the Hull-Spence Hypothesis, her dissertation studied the possibility of anxiety being a dispositional trait. "Quite simply, I investigated whether chronically anxious individuals would classically condition more rapidly that less anxious individuals," she explained. One of her accomplishments was creating an instrument to measure her hypothesis. This instrument, called the Taylor Manifest Anxiety Scale, "consisted of 50 statements that were indicative of manifest anxiety when answered a certain way," and is one of her most acknowledged pieces, especially because it was the first of its kind. She graduated in 1949 with a Ph.D. in Psychology.

== Post-education work and life ==
After graduation, Spence accepted a position as a psychology instructor at Northwestern University. In 1951, her first article, "Anxiety and strength of UCS as determiners of the amount of eyelid conditioning," was published with Kenneth Spence as the co-author. In the same year, her first independently authored article, "The relationship of anxiety to the conditioned eyelid response," was published. She later received associate professor standing and stayed at this job until 1960. She first experienced gender discrimination in the work force when she began teaching at Northwestern University. She was given the opportunity to be the first female faculty member because, as Janet Taylor Spence said, "the chair of the university thought 'having a woman on the faculty was a novel and interesting idea,'" against the belief of some of the other faculty members. She also wrote a statistics textbook.

Janet Taylor Spence and Kenneth Spence were married on December 27, 1959, and moved to Iowa shortly after. As she was female and unable to get a job at the Department of Psychology of the University of Iowa, she was hired by the Veterans Hospital in Iowa City as a research psychologist. While working at the VA Hospital, she was able to expand her interests to the study of schizophrenia. In 1964, she and her husband moved to Austin, Texas for his job at the University of Texas. Just as in Iowa, because she was female, she was unable to get a job at the university. She accepted a job at an institution for the mentally handicapped called the Austin State School. While there, she began a number of studies with normal and mentally handicapped children. She was later offered a position at the University of Texas by the Department of Educational Psychology. She went on to replace the chair of the Department of Psychology.

Her husband died on January 12, 1967, but that did not slow down her progress. In 1970, Spence was elected to the Board of Scientific Affairs of the American Psychological Association (APA). Two years later, she became the president of the Southwestern Psychological Association. In 1974, she began editing Contemporary Psychology, where she had started as an associate editor to Gardner Lindzey five years prior. During the 1970s, she was on the Board of Directors for the APA and served on the Communications Committee with oversight for development of a National Information System for Psychology. She later became sixth female president of the APA in 1985.

In 1984, Spence founded and became the first elected president of the American Psychological Society (now the Association for Psychological Science). She was awarded the 1993 National Academy of Sciences Award for Excellence in Scientific Reviewing. She has been awarded three honorary doctorates from Oberlin College, Ohio State University and the University of Toledo. She was editor of the Annual Review of Psychology from 1995 to 1999. She also received the American Psychological Foundation's 2004 Gold Medal Award for Life Achievement in the Science of Psychology (American Psychologist, 2004). She has been a visiting research professor at Harvard twice. She has claimed that "as children and teenagers, my sister and I were fully exposed to all these activities...perhaps it was due to the exposure to the human suffering so common during the Depression and my parents' concern with it that as a young adolescent I decided I wanted to become a psychologist".

In 2009, the Janet Taylor Spence Award for Transformative Early Career Contributions was established by the APS Board of Directors to recognize transformative contributions to psychological science by rising stars in the field. The award is a fitting tribute to Spence, who developed new approaches to research and pioneering tools including the Taylor Manifest Anxiety Scale and the Attitudes Toward Women Scale, as well as crossing disciplinary boundaries with work on topics ranging from schizophrenia to developmental psychology to gender bias.

== Works ==
- Spence, J. T. (1988). Janet Taylor Spence. In A. N. O'Connell, & N. F. Russo (Eds.), Models of achievement: Reflections of eminent women in psychology (Vol. 2). (pp. 191–203). Hillsdale, NJ: Lawrence Erlbaum Associates.
- Spence, J. T. (1999). Thirty years of gender research: a personal chronicle. In W. B. Swann, Jr., J. H. Langolis, & L. A. Gilbert (Eds.), Sexism and stereotypes in modern society: The gender science of Janet Taylor Spence. (pp. 35–42). Washington, DC: American Psychological Association.Further Reading Spence, J. T., & Helmreich, R. L. (1978). Masculinity and femininity: Their psychological dimensions, correlates and antecedents. Austin: University of Texas Press.
- Spence, J. T., & Helmreich, R. (1972b). Who likes competent women? Competence, sex-role congruence of interest, and subjects' attitudes toward women as determinants of interpersonal attraction. Journal of Applied Social Psychology, 2, 197-213.
- Spence, J. T., Helmreich, R. L., & Stapp, J. (1973). The Personal Attributes Questionnaire: A Measure of sex-role stereotypes and masculinity-femininity. JSAS Catalog of Selected Documents in Psychology, 4, 43-44 (Ms. 617).
