= Jean Macfarlane =

American psychologist

Jean Walker Macfarlane (1894–1989) was an American psychologist. She was born in Selma, California. In 1922 she earned a doctoral degree in psychology at the University of California, Berkeley; she was the second person ever to do so, the first being Olga Bridgman in 1915. In 1927 Macfarlane founded the University of California, Berkeley's Institute of Human Development, originally called the Institute of Child Welfare.

In 1928 Macfarlane began a lifelong study of 250 individuals born that year and the next year that still continues, known as the Guidance Study, which provides information on normal personalities; previously psychological theories were mostly based on information about abnormal personalities. She was a professor at the University of California, Berkeley from 1929 until 1961.

In 1963 Macfarlane received the American Psychological Association Award for Distinguished contributions to the Science and Profession of Clinical Psychology. In 1972 she won The G. Stanley Hall Award for Distinguished Contribution to Developmental Psychology, along with Margaret Harlow and Harry Harlow. It is the American Psychological Association's highest honor in developmental psychology.

Macfarlane was president of the California State Psychological Association and of the Western Psychological Association, as well as a member of the board of directors of the American Psychological Association and president of its Division of Clinical Psychology.

During her undergraduate career, Macfarlane became a close friend of Theodora Kroeber, and her passion for psychology influenced Kroeber's decision to major in that discipline.
