= Michael Neale =

British behavior geneticist

- Born: Michael Churton Neale; 10 March 1958 (age 68); Amersham, England
- Citizenship: British
- Education: University of London
- Known for: Work on statistical modeling in behavior genetics
- Spouse: Yes
- Children: Six
- Awards: Fulker Award from the Behavior Genetics Association (2000); Virginia Commonwealth University Distinguished Scholarship Award (2017)
- Scientific career
- Fields: Psychiatry
- Workplaces: Virginia Commonwealth University
- Thesis: Biometrical genetic analysis of human individual differences (1985)

Michael C. Neale (born 10 March 1958) is a British behavior geneticist and professor at the Virginia Institute for Psychiatric and Behavioral Genetics at Virginia Commonwealth University. He is known for his research in the field of psychiatric genetics, which aims to determine the roles of genetic and environmental factors in psychiatric disorders and substance abuse. He is estimated to have mentored over 2,000 students in his field. He was president of the Behavior Genetics Association from 2009 to 2010.
