= Misbehaving Science =

2014 book by Aaron Panofsky

Misbehaving Science: Controversy and the Development of Behavior Genetics
- First edition
- Author: Aaron Panofsky
- Language: English
- Subject: Behavior genetics
- Genre: Nonfiction
- Publisher: University of Chicago Press
- Publication date: July 2014
- Pages: 320
- Awards: 2015 President’s Book Award from the Social Science History Association
- ISBN: 022605845X

Misbehaving Science: Controversy and the Development of Behavior Genetics is a 2014 book about the history of behavior genetics. It was written by University of California, Los Angeles sociologist Aaron Panofsky, and was published by the University of Chicago Press. It won the 2015 President's Book Award from the Social Science History Association.

== Summary ==
In Misbehaving Science, Panofsky argues that eugenics was reinvented in the mid-20th century as behavior genetics, and that this was done in the hope of curing many social problems such as crime and homelessness. He refers to behavior genetics as "misbehaving science" because, according to him, the standards of scientific inquiry in this field are vague enough to allow political and social ideologies to affect scientific conclusions. As he put it in the book: "If science is like a machine for resolving controversies, in misbehaving science that machine is broken." Panofsky also contends that behavior geneticists have reacted to disappointing research results in molecular genetics by simply lowering their expectations.

== Reviews ==
Reviews of Misbehaving Science were published in the British Journal for the History of Science, New Genetics and Society, Medical Anthropology Quarterly, the Journal of the History of Biology, Science, Technology & Society, and Developmental Psychobiology.

New Scientist's Kate Douglas wrote that in Misbehaving Science, Panofsky tells the story of the development of behavior genetics "with wonderful insight". Tal Arbel of Tel Aviv University wrote that the book "offers an original, sharply intelligent and timely analysis of the historical conditions, social mechanisms and cultural forces" that led to the development of behavior genetics. Another favorable review appeared in New Genetics and Society, where Northwestern University sociologist Mariana Craciun described the book as "detailed and compelling". In her review of the book, Nicole C. Nelson of the University of Wisconsin–Madison wrote that "The conclusions Panofsky reaches are specific to the field of behavior genetics, but his approach offers insights that are potentially applicable to many other fields. His exemplary handling of different levels of analysis would make this text especially useful for a graduate-level methods course." In a review published in the Journal of the History of Biology, Hallam Stevens also praised the book, writing that Panofsky's "...empirically rich and provocative account of the history of behavior genetics gives us a compelling example of how a discipline can propel itself by courting controversy, drumming up attention, and rehashing old arguments."
