= Social Science History =

- Discipline: Social history, economic history, political history
- Language: English
- Edited by: Anne McCants

Publication details
- History: 1976–present
- Publisher: Duke University Press (until 2015); Cambridge University Press (since 2015) (United States)
- Frequency: Quarterly
- Impact factor: 0.954 (2021)

Standard abbreviations
- ISO 4: Soc. Sci. Hist.

Indexing
- ISSN: 0145-5532 (print); 1527-8034 (web)
- LCCN: 77640161
- JSTOR: 01455532
- OCLC no.: 42413348

Links
- Journal homepage; Online access; Online archive

Social Science History is a quarterly peer-reviewed academic journal. It is the official journal of the Social Science History Association. Its articles bring an analytic, theoretical, and often quantitative approach to historical evidence. Its editors-in-chief are Anne McCants (Massachusetts Institute of Technology) and Kris Inwood of Guelph University.

== History ==
The first issue came out in the fall of 1976. The journal's founders intended to "improve the quality of historical explanation" with "theories and methods from the social science disciplines" and to make generalizations across historical cases. The journal was first published by the University Center for International Studies at the University of Pittsburgh then starting in the 1980s by Duke University Press. Starting in 2015 the publisher is Cambridge University Press.

== Lawsuit with publisher ==
The Social Science History Association invited bids from publishers and told the Duke University Press in June 2012 of its intent to end the agreement for the press to publish Social Science History. The association planned to seek another publisher. Duke asserted it owned the title of the journal, though not the copyright for its contents. In March 2013 the association sued the press for copyright infringement. When the case was resolved the association was able to switch publishers.

== Abstracting and indexing ==
The journal is abstracted and indexed in:

- Academic Search Elite
- Academic Search Premier
- America: History and Life
- Arts and Humanities Citation Index
- Current Contents/Arts and Humanities
- Historical Abstracts
- International Bibliography of Periodical Literature (IBZ)
- International Political Science Abstracts
- Scopus, Social Sciences Citation Index
- SocINDEX
- SocINFO
- Sociological Abstracts

According to the Journal Citation Reports, the journal has a 2021 impact factor of 0.954.
