= Tracy Kendler =

American psychologist

- Born: Sylvia Seedman; August 4, 1918; Brooklyn, New York
- Died: July 28, 2001 (aged 82)
- Education: Brooklyn College; University of Iowa
- Occupation: Psychologist

Tracy Kendler, née Sylvia Seedman (August 4, 1918 – July 28, 2001) was an American research psychologist known for her research in discrimination learning.

== Early life and education ==
Kendler was born Sylvia Seedman in Brooklyn, New York, and changed her name to Tracy at a young age. She was encouraged to find a husband instead of attending university, but matriculated at Brooklyn College, where she began to work with Abraham Maslow. She and her future husband, Howard H. Kendler, moved to the University of Iowa for their graduate studies, where she studied for a master's degree with Kenneth Spence and did research in neobehaviorism for her Ph.D., which she earned in 1943. Kendler was not offered any paying employment at the university during her studies; she worked concurrently at a state mental hospital as a clinical psychologist, for the Army as a statistician, and as a volunteer psychologist.

== Career and research ==
After her graduate studies, Kendler moved to Washington, D.C., and began her career in the Army Air Force Selection Program. While raising a family, she worked with the American Jewish Congress and the NAACP to gather evidence for the Brown v. Board of Education case, which outlawed "separate but equal" educational segregation in the United States.

Her major research began with a study of discrimination learning in young children to compare their behavior to adult humans and rats. From 1946 to 1948, she was an instructor at the University of Colorado Boulder. In 1955, Kendler became an assistant professor in psychology at Barnard College of Columbia University. Her work received widespread attention and funding from the National Science Foundation, and she was summarily promoted to associate professor in 1959, and she earned tenure in 1960. However, while she was there, she was not allowed to teach graduate courses and discriminated against for her gender.

Kendler's husband was offered a professorship at the University of California, Santa Barbara in 1963, but she was not offered a position due to anti-nepotism rules. After long negotiations, the university granted her an exception – the first in its history – and she was given a professorship in 1966. Her work there included significant mentorship, extensive publication, and research on the neurophysiology of cognitive development. She retired and became a professor emerita in 1989, was diagnosed with pulmonary fibrosis in 1997, and died of the disease in 2001.

== Honors and awards ==
- Guggenheim Fellowship, 1974
- Governing Board, Psychonomic Society (first woman)
- Member, Society of Experimental Psychologists
- President, Western Psychological Association
