= Murders of Bernice and Ben Novack Jr. =

2009 murders in Florida and NY

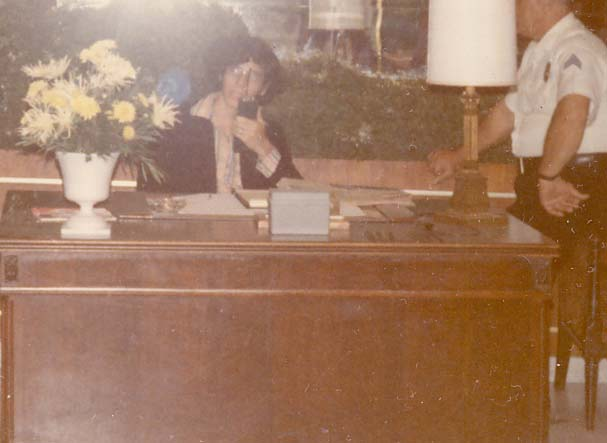
Ben Novack Jr. working with security at a desk in the lobby of the Fontainebleau in 1972

In 2009, Bernice Novack and her son, Fontainebleau Miami Beach hotel heir Ben Novack Jr., were murdered three months apart. Narcy Novack (née Narcisa Véliz Pacheco; born 1956), Ben's estranged wife was convicted of orchestrating the murders, and after a highly publicized trial was sentenced to life in prison without the possibility of parole.

== Crimes ==
On April 5, 2009, Ben's 87-year-old mother, Bernice (December 2, 1921 – April 4, 2009), was found dead in her Fort Lauderdale, Florida garage. Her husband, Ben Novack Sr., who built the hotel and owned it until 1977, had died in 1985. Her death was initially ruled to be the result of an accidental fall while trying to get out of her car in her garage, but after her son's murder three months later, a subsequent police investigation revealed that her death was a homicide.

On the morning of July 12, 2009, her son, who was 53, was found bludgeoned and suffocated to death in the penthouse suite at the Hilton Hotel in Rye Brook, New York. He was bound with duct tape and his eyes were gouged out. At the time of his death, he was having an affair with porn actress Rebecca E. Bliss (1976-2023). He was also the heir to a multimillion-dollar estate.

== Trial ==
Narcy Novack, from Fort Lauderdale, was arrested for the murders of her husband and mother-in-law in July 2010, three days shy of a year after her husband's death. Her brother, Cristóbal Véliz, was also accused of enlisting Alejandro Gutiérrez-García, Joel González, and Denis Ramírez to participate in both murders.

Narcy Novack and Cristóbal Véliz were tried together in a federal courtroom in White Plains, New York in 2012. The duo's defense was to blame Narcy's only daughter from a previous marriage, May Abad, for having orchestrated the killings, stating that she was motivated to collect on Ben Novack Jr.'s estate, including a large collection of Batman memorabilia. Prosecutors alleged that Narcy was afraid that her husband would leave her for his mistress, and that a prenuptial agreement would only leave her $65,000 instead of the bulk of her late husband's estate. They claimed she was motivated by "hatred, greed, and vengeance."

== Verdict ==
At the conclusion of the trial, Narcy and Veliz were each convicted of murder, conspiracy to commit murder, domestic violence, stalking, money laundering, and witness tampering. Narcy waived her right to appear in court when the guilty verdict was read. She also did not appear in court when she was sentenced to life in prison without parole. Novack is currently incarcerated at the Federal Correctional Institution Tallahassee in Tallahassee, Florida. Véliz was also sentenced to life in prison without parole and he is currently incarcerated at the United States Penitentiary, Big Sandy in Inez, Kentucky. Gutiérrez-García, González, and Ramírez all pleaded guilty to lesser charges.

In accordance with the slayer rule, Narcy Novack is ineligible to inherit her husband's estate. Ben Novack Jr.'s estate, valued at $4.2 million, is expected to go to Novack's daughter, May Abad, and Abad's two sons.

== In the media ==
The subject of the Novack murders has been televised on several programs including Deadly Rich, My Dirty Little Secret (ID), 48 Hours, Dateline NBC, Snapped, True Crime with Aphrodite Jones and Dying to Belong.

The story was also the basis for the 2015 made-for-television Lifetime movie Beautiful & Twisted, directed by Christopher Zalla and starring Rob Lowe as Ben Novack Jr., Paz Vega as Narcy, and Candice Bergen as Bernice Novack.
