= Edward C. Tolman =

American psychologist (1886–1959)

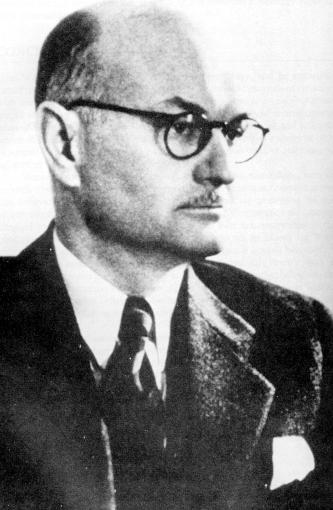
- Born: Edward Chace Tolman; April 14, 1886; West Newton, Massachusetts, US
- Died: November 19, 1959 (aged 73); Berkeley, California, US
- Education: Massachusetts Institute of Technology; Harvard University
- Known for: Behavioral psychology, cognitive map, latent learning, purposive behaviorism
- Scientific career
- Fields: Psychology
- Workplaces: University of California, Berkeley; Northwestern University
- Thesis: Studies in Memory (1915)
- Doctoral advisor: Edwin Bissell Holt
- Doctoral students: Murray Jarvik

Edward Chace Tolman (April 14, 1886 – November 19, 1959) was an American psychologist and a professor of psychology at the University of California, Berkeley. Through Tolman's theories and works, he founded what is now a branch of psychology known as purposive behaviorism. Tolman also promoted the concept known as latent learning coined by Blodgett (1929). A Review of General Psychology survey, published in 2002, ranked Tolman as the 45th most cited psychologist of the 20th century.

Tolman was one of the leading figures in protecting academic freedom during the McCarthy era in early 1950s. In recognition of Tolman's contributions to both the development of psychology and academic freedom, the Education and Psychology building on Berkeley campus, the "Tolman Hall", was named after him.

== Early life ==
Born in West Newton, Massachusetts, brother of Caltech physicist Richard Chace Tolman, Edward C. Tolman studied at the Massachusetts Institute of Technology, receiving B.S. in electrochemistry in 1911. Tolman's father was a president of a manufacturing company and his mother was adamant of her Quaker background. Tolman attended MIT because of family pressures, but after reading William James' Principles of Psychology he decided to abandon physics, chemistry, and mathematics in order to study philosophy and psychology. James' influence on Tolman could be seen in Tolman's courageous attitude and his willingness to cope with issues that cause controversy and are against the popular views of the time. Tolman always said he was strongly influenced by the Gestalt psychologists, especially Kurt Lewin and Kurt Koffka.

In 1912, Tolman went to Giessen in Germany to study for his PhD examination. While there he was introduced to and later returned to study Gestalt psychology. Later, Tolman transferred to Harvard University for graduate studies and worked in the laboratory of Hugo Munsterburg. He received his PhD from Harvard University in 1915.

== Career ==
Tolman is best known for his studies of learning in rats using mazes, and he published many experimental articles, of which his paper with Ritchie and Kalish in 1946 was probably the most influential. His major theoretical contributions came in his 1932 book, Purposive Behavior in Animals and Men, and in a series of papers in the Psychological Review, "The determinants of behavior at a choice point" (1938), "Cognitive maps in rats and men" (1948), and "Principles of performance" (1955).

=== Purposive behaviorism ===
Some of Tolman's early researches were early developments of what is now called behavioral genetics. Tolman would selectively breed rats for the ability to learn the mazes he constructed. Despite the fact that his major research focus involved instinct and purpose, he was open to the idea of researching innate abilities in the rats. Tolman's study was the first experiment to examine the genetic basis of maze learning by breeding distinct lineages of rats selected for their maze performance. Tolman started and continued this research project until 1932, where, after coming back from Europe on a sabbatical leave, his interest started to decrease. Tolman's theoretical model was described in his paper "The Determiners of Behavior at a Choice Point" (1938). The three different variables that influence behavior are: independent, intervening, and dependent variables. The experimenter can manipulate the independent variables; these independent variables (e.g., stimuli provided) in turn influence the intervening variables (e.g., motor skill, appetite). Independent variables are also factors of the subject that the experimenter specifically chooses for. The dependent variables (e.g., speed, number of errors) allows the psychologist to measure the strength of the intervening variables.

Although Tolman was firmly behaviorist in his methodology, he was not a radical behaviorist like B. F. Skinner. In his studies of learning in rats, Tolman sought to demonstrate that animals could learn facts about the world that they could subsequently use in a flexible manner, rather than simply learning automatic responses that were triggered off by environmental stimuli. In the language of the time, Tolman was an "S-S" (stimulus-stimulus), non-reinforcement theorist: he drew on Gestalt psychology to argue that animals could learn the connections between stimuli and did not need any explicit biologically significant event to make learning occur. This is known as latent learning. The rival theory, the much more mechanistic "S-R" (stimulus-response) reinforcement-driven view, was taken up by Clark L. Hull.

A key paper by Tolman, Ritchie, and Kalish in 1946 demonstrated that rats learned the layout of a maze, which they explored freely without reinforcement. After some trials, a food item was placed to a certain point of the maze, and the rats learned to navigate to that point very quickly. However, Hull and his followers were able to produce alternative explanations of Tolman's findings, and the debate between S-S and S-R learning theories became increasingly complicated. Skinner's iconoclastic paper of 1950, entitled "Are theories of learning necessary?", persuaded many psychologists interested in animal learning that it was more productive to focus on the behavior itself rather than using it to make hypotheses about mental states. The influence of Tolman's ideas faded temporarily in the later 1950s and 1960s. However, his achievements had been considerable. His 1938 and 1955 papers, produced to answer Hull's charge that he left the rat "buried in thought" in the maze, unable to respond, anticipated and prepared the ground for much later work in cognitive psychology, as psychologists began to discover and apply decision theory – a stream of work that was recognized by the award of a Nobel Prize to Daniel Kahneman in 2002. In his 1948 paper "Cognitive Maps in Rats and Men", Tolman introduced the concept of a cognitive map, which has found extensive application in almost every field of psychology, frequently among scientists who are unaware that they are using the early ideas that were formulated to explain the behavior of rats in mazes. Tolman assessed both response learning and place learning. Response learning is when the rat knows that the response of going a certain way in the maze will always lead to food; place learning is when the rats learn to associate the food in a specific spot each time. In his trials he observed that all of the rats in the place-learning maze learned to run the correct path within eight trials and that none of the response-learning rats learned that quickly, and some did not even learn it at all after seventy-two trials.

Furthermore, psychologists began to renew the study of animal cognition in the last quarter of the 20th century. This renewed interested in animal research was prompted by experiments in cognitive psychology.

=== Other psychological work ===
Aside from the contributions Tolman made to learning theory such as purposive behaviorism and latent learning, he also wrote an article on his view of ways of learning and wrote some works involving psychology, sociology, and anthropology. Tolman was very concerned that psychology should be applied to try to solve human problems, and in addition to his technical publications, he wrote a book called Drives Toward War. Moreover, in one of his papers, "A theoretical Analysis of the Relations between Psychology and Sociology", Tolman takes independent, dependent, and intervening variables under the context of psychology and sociology. Then he puts them together and show the interrelations between the two subjects in terms of variables and research. In another publication, "Physiology, Psychology, and Sociology", Tolman takes the three subjects and explains how all three depend or interrelate with each other and must be looked at as a whole. Tolman creates a hypothetical situation and shows the conditions and interrelations between the three subjects in the situation.

Tolman developed a two-level theory of instinct in response to the debate, at the time, of the relevance of instinct to psychology. Instinct was broken down into two parts: determining or driving adjustments and subordinate acts. Adjustments are motivations or purposes behind subordinate acts, while the subordinate acts fulfill that purpose. Adjustments are the response to a stimulus and can be arranged in a hierarchy with the lowest adjustment producing subordinate acts. Subordinate acts are randomized independent actions, excluding reflexes, that are part of larger groups of activity. While considered infinitely numerous, the amount found in a grouping is limited with identifiable boundaries. The cycle begins with a stimulus that produces a determining adjustment or a hierarchy of adjustments. The lowest adjustment then cues subordinate acts that persist until the purpose of the adjustment is fulfilled.

Humans are unique in that we can think out our actions ahead of time. Tolman called this thoughts-of-acts or thinking-of-acts. This prevents us from acting completely random until something finally works. Thinking-of-acts triggers an inhibitory process that prevents the determining adjustment from cuing subordinate acts. Following the thinking, a prepotent stimulus turns those thoughts into acts. There are two ways a stimulus would be considered prepotent: (a) the original adjustment is favorable to the act produced by the foresee stimulus, or (b) the stimulus creates an alternative adjustment more favorable than the original.

An example of this theory in action could be being trapped in a burning building. Without thinking, the lowest determining adjustment would be to escape, producing various acts where you may run around randomly trying to stumble upon an escape route. Or, you could stop and think, inhibiting that first process. You remember that the door in the corner leads to a hallway, to a stairwell, to a set of doors to the street. This would be an example of thinking-of-acts. The street would be the prepotent stimulus because it produces a favorable act to the original stimulus. Alternately, you could think that it might be dangerous to use the stairwell as smoke tends to pool in them and instead run to a window to call for help. This would be another version of a prepotent stimulus because it produces an alternative adjustment that is more favorable than the original. This might be because you learned that it may be safer to stay near a window and call for help than to go further into the burning building, creating a self-preservation adjustment.

In 1948 Tolman wrote an article regarding the life of Kurt Lewin after Lewin's death in 1947. It contained some of Lewin's background, his contributions, and honest criticisms of his research. Overall Tolman wrote about him in a very positive light. Tolman regarded him along with Sigmund Freud as psychologists who would be well recognized in the future.

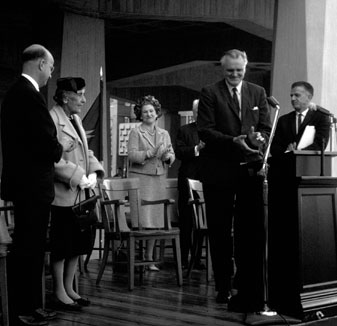
Tolman Hall Dedication Ceremony, 1963, left to right Clark Kerr, Kathleen Tolman, Edythe Brown (wife of department chair), Chancellor Edward Strong, Ernest R. Hilgard (guest speaker)

=== Northwestern and Berkeley ===
Edward Tolman started his academic career in Northwestern University, where he was an instructor from 1915 to 1918. Most of Tolman career, however, was spent at the University of California, Berkeley (from 1918 to 1954), where he was a professor of psychology.

He was one of the senior professors whom the University of California sought to dismiss in the McCarthy era of the early 1950s, because he refused to sign a loyalty oath — not because of any lack of felt loyalty to the United States but because it infringed on academic freedom. Tolman was a leader of the resistance to the oath, and when the Regents of the University of California sought to fire him, he sued. Tolman made an address to the Special Convocation at McGill University on June 11, 1954. In his address he advocated and made argument for the need of academic freedom, as well as criticized scapegoating. The resulting court case, Tolman v. Underhill, led in 1955 to the California Supreme Court overturning the oath and forcing the reinstatement of all those who had refused to sign it.

In 1963, at the insistence of the then President of the University of California, Clark Kerr, the Berkeley campus' newly constructed Education and Psychology building was named "Tolman Hall" in honor of the late professor. Tolman's portrait hung in the entrance hall of the building. Tolman Hall was demolished in 2019 due to seismic unsafety.

== Awards and honors ==
Tolman received many awards and honors. He was president of the American Psychological Association (APA) in 1937 and chairman of Lewin's Society for the Psychological Study of Social issues in 1940; he was a member of the Society of Experimental Psychologists, the United States National Academy of Sciences, and the American Philosophical Society. APA gave him an award in 1957 for distinguished contributions. He was elected a Fellow of the American Academy of Arts and Sciences in 1949.

== Personal life ==
Tolman was married to Kathleen Drew Tolman. They had three children, Deborah, Mary, and Edward James. Noted singer-songwriter, music producer Russ Tolman, is Tolman's grandson.

As mentioned previously, Tolman's father wished for his son to eventually take over the manufacturing company. Tolman was more interested in pursuing psychology than pursuing his father's career. Fortunately his family was very supportive of this decision.

== See also ==
- The Logic of Modern Physics
