= Taylor Manifest Anxiety Scale =

- Purpose: test of anxiety

The Taylor Manifest Anxiety Scale, often shortened to TMAS, is a test of anxiety as a personality trait, and was created by Janet Taylor in 1953 to identify subjects who would be useful in the study of anxiety disorders. The TMAS originally consisted of 50 true or false questions a person answers by reflecting on themselves, in order to determine their anxiety level. Janet Taylor spent her career in the field of psychology studying anxiety and gender development. Her scale has often been used to separate normal participants from those who would be considered to have pathological anxiety levels. The TMAS has been shown to have high test-retest reliability. The test is for adults but in 1956 a children's form was developed. The test was very popular for many years after its development but is now used infrequently.

== Development and validation ==
The TMAS has been proven reliable using test-retest reliability. O’Connor, Lorr, and Stafford found there were five general factors in the scale: chronic anxiety or worry, increased physiological reactivity, sleep disturbances associated with inner strain, sense of personal inadequacy, and motor tension. This study showed that persons administered the test could be display different anxiety levels across these areas. O’Connor, Lorr, and Stafford's realization allows patients and their doctors to better understand which dimension of anxiety needs to be addressed.

== Childhood and adolescence ==
The Children's Manifest Anxiety Scale, sometimes shortened to the CMAS, was created in 1956. This scale was closely modeled after the Taylor Manifest Anxiety Scale. It was developed so that the TMAS could be applied to a broader range of people, specifically children. Kitano tested the validity of the CMAS by comparing students who were placed in special education classes versus those placed in regular classrooms. Kitano proposed the idea that children who were in special education classes were more likely to have higher anxiety than those in regular classrooms. Using the CMAS, Kitano found boys tested in the special education classes had higher anxiety scores than their regular classroom counterparts. Hafner tested the reliability of the CMAS with the knowledge that the TMAS had a feminine bias. Hafner found that the CMAS did not have a female bias. He only found two questions that females always scored higher on than their male counterparts. As the test stands now, the suggestion is to compare the female and male participants separately. Castaneda found significant differences across different grade levels, indicating that as students develop they are affected differentially by various stressors.

== Gender differences ==
Although the CMAS proved to not have a feminine bias, Quarter and Laxer found that females tend to score higher on the TMAS than their male counterparts. An example of these questions endorsed more frequently by females is "I cry easily". Similarly, Goodstein and Goldberger found that 17 of the 38 questions were more likely to be endorsed by females than males. Gall found that when she tested the femininity versus masculinity qualities of men and women, then compared them to the TMAS score, the people that were more feminine, either male or female, were more likely to have a positive correlation with their anxiety level score. Based on this, Gall agreed with previous research that stated the TMAS is more strongly female based. Hafner, however, found that the CMAS does not reflect the gender difference as the girls that took the children's test only scored higher than the boys consistently on two of the questions.

== Cultural differences ==
Since the Taylor Manifest Anxiety Scale was introduced in 1953, comprehensive research has been done regarding the validity of the scale. across different cultures. In 1967, a study of cross-cultural differences in the scale was done between 9 year-old Japanese, French, and American students. The data concluded that Japanese and French students tested significantly lower on anxiety scores compared to the American students. Thus, there are strong cross-cultural differences related to the scores on the TMAS. Additional studies of the validity of the TMAS include a study between South African Natives and South African Europeans in 1979. Both groups included individuals with varying levels of education. This study found that the TMAS is sensitive to certain cross-cultural differences, but precautions should be taken when interpreting scores from the scale in non-Western cultures, regardless of the individual's education level.

== The Adult Manifest Anxiety Scale ==
In 2003, the Adult Manifest Anxiety Scale was introduced. It was made for three different age groups. The AMAS takes into account age-related situations that affect an individual's anxiety. The divisions include one scale for adults (AMA-A), one scale for college students (AMAS-C), and the other for the elderly population (AMAS-E). Each scale is geared towards examining situations specific to that age group. For example, the AMAS-C has items pertaining specifically to college students, such as questions about anxiety of the future. The AMAS-A is geared more toward mid-life issues, and the AMAS-E has specific anxieties the older population deals with, such as fear of aging and dying. The AMAS-A contains 36 items. It has 14 questions relating to worry/oversensitivity, nine questions about physiological anxiety, seven questions about social concerns/stress, and six questions about lies. An example of an age appropriate item for this scale is "I am worried about my job performance". The AMAS-C contains 49 items about the same topics, but incorporates 15 items related specifically to test anxiety. Questions relating to the items on this scale include "I worry too much about tests and exams". This scale is similar in structure to the CMAS discussed above. The AMAS-E contains 44 items related to worry/oversensitivity, physiological anxiety, lying, and the fear of aging. Twenty-three of the questions on the AMAS-E are related to worry/oversensitivity, but The Fear of Aging category of this scale includes items such as "I worry about becoming senile". Similar to the TMAS, the AMAS can be given in a group or individual setting, and the person responds either yes or no to each item listed according to if it pertains to themselves or not. The more items that are answered yes, suggest a higher level of anxiety. The scale has been said to be easy to complete and practical, because it takes only about 10 minutes to complete and just a few minutes to score.

=== Applications and limitations ===
The AMAS has a broad range of applications, but also a number of limitations. The AMAS can be used in clinical settings, career counseling centers on campuses, hospices, nursing homes, and to monitor the progress and effectiveness of psychotherapy and drug treatment. Effective psychotherapy is indicated by a decrease in AMAS. Almost all college students will experience some type of stress in their academic career. Examples of their stress range from text anxiety to worry of the future after graduation. The AMAS-C items can provide psychologists with a statistical reference point to judge the student's level of anxiety compared to other college students. A limitation of the AMAS-C is that it does not lend insight into the factors that are influencing the students anxiety, such as lack of studying and social factors. A more formal and extensive level of testing is necessary to resolve this limitation.

== Utility ==
The utility of the TMAS is that it is a way to relate anxiety directly to performance in a certain area. The scale is able to measure anxiety levels and use the scores to determine performance on certain tasks. In some studies, researchers found that high anxiety (high drive) participants would make a greater number of mistakes, therefore taking longer for the participants to reach the learned criterion, whereas participants with low anxiety (low drive) would reach the learned criterion quicker. The TMAS was able to measure that anxiety, so the researchers could make inclusions or exclusions of the participants for their specific studies. This would allow them to achieve the results they want. The TMAS was also a way to relate intelligence to anxiety. Studies have shown there is a possible correlation between anxiety and academic achievement, but they do not recommend it be the sole predictor of achievement. It should be paired with other tests in order to make an accurate prediction.

== Decline ==
The TMAS scale was frequently used in the past; however, its use has declined over the years due to problems with the validity of this self-report measure. Participants use their own judgement when answering questions, which causes internal and construct validity issues, which makes the interpretation of results difficult. Another possible reason this scale has declined in its use over the years is that researchers seemed to only get results of anxiety from participants under threat conditions and not under non-threat conditions, which again questioned the scale's validity.

== Awards ==
The Association for Psychological Science established an award in honor of Janet Taylor Spence for her contributions to psychology. Receiving this award means that the psychologist made honorable, new, creative, and cutting edge contributions to research and impact in the early years of their career, as Janet Taylor did during her career. The award is named the Janet Taylor Spence Award for Transformative Early Career Contributions.
