= Ben Novack =

American hotelier

- Born: Benjamin Novick; February 24, 1907; New York, United States
- Died: April 5, 1985 (aged 78); Miami, Florida, United States
- Occupation: Hotelier
- Spouse(s): Bella Novack (divorced); Bernice Mildred Stempel
- Children: Ronald Marc Novack; Ben Novack Jr.
- Parent(s): Sadie and Hyman Novick

Ben Novack (1907–1985) was an American hotelier who developed the Fontainebleau Miami Beach Hotel.

== Biography ==
Novack was born to a Jewish family, the son of Sadie and Hyman Novick. He had three older siblings: Miriam (born 1903), Joseph (born 1904), and Lillian (born 1905). His father was an immigrant from Russia who worked as a clothing cutter before opening his own clothing store; after the store failed, the family moved to the Catskill Mountains where he operated a hotel in the Borscht Belt. After his father's death, he operated the hotel with his brother but disagreements led him to move to New York City where he Americanized his name to Novack and ran a haberdashery; the store also failed after he had a falling out with his partner.

In 1940, Novack and his wife moved to Miami Beach with $1,800 they had from liquidating his clothing stores assets. At the time, Miami Beach was thriving despite the Great Depression thanks to it having become the winter playground of the rich. He raised additional funds and purchased the 111-room Monroe Towers Hotel which turned into a lucrative investment once World War II started and the U.S. government used Miami as a training ground for 100,000 soldiers that required basic living space. With his earnings, he bought out his partners and went on to purchase four more hotels including the Cornell and the Atlantis. In 1949, he partnered with Harry Mufson and opened the Sans Souci Hotel designed by Morris Lapidus.

In 1952, Novack and Mufson purchased the Harvey Firestone mansion for $2.3 million; the partnership soon collapsed after Novack deceived Mufson and set about to have himself as the sole owner on the deed. Novack raised additional funds from a diverse range of investors including Ben Jaffe and mobsters Sam Giancana and Joseph Fischetti; he again used Morris Lapidus as the architect. In 1954, the 1,250-room Fontainebleau Miami Beach Hotel opened. Steve Wynn (who would marry Novack's great-niece) commented that the Fontainebleau created the concept of the hotel as a show. His estranged partner, Mufson, would go on to build the Eden Roc Miami Beach Hotel immediately to the north of the Fontainebleau also using Lapidus as architect. In 1977, the Fontainebleau filed for Federal bankruptcy protection. In 1978, Stephen Muss bought the Fontainebleau for $27 million. In 2005, Muss sold the Fontainebleau to Donald Soffer's, Turnberry Associates for $165 million.

== Personal life ==
Novack married twice. His first wife was Bella Novack; they adopted a son, Ronald Marc Novack, before divorcing in 1951. In 1952, he married Bernice Mildred Stempel, a model born to a Jewish father and Roman Catholic mother of Irish descent. In 1956, Bernice had a son, Ben Novack Jr. Novack died of heart and lung failure on April 5, 1985. His great-niece, Andrea Hissom, is married to Steve Wynn. Ben and Joseph Novack were brothers, Joseph was Andrea's grandfather, making Ben Sr her granduncle.

In 2009, his wife Bernice and his son, Ben Novack Jr. were murdered three months apart. Narcy Novack (née Narcisa Véliz Pacheco; born 1947), Ben Jr.'s estranged wife, was convicted of orchestrating the murders and, after a highly publicized trial, was sentenced to life in prison without the possibility of parole.
