= Jenny Kendler =

American environmental artist

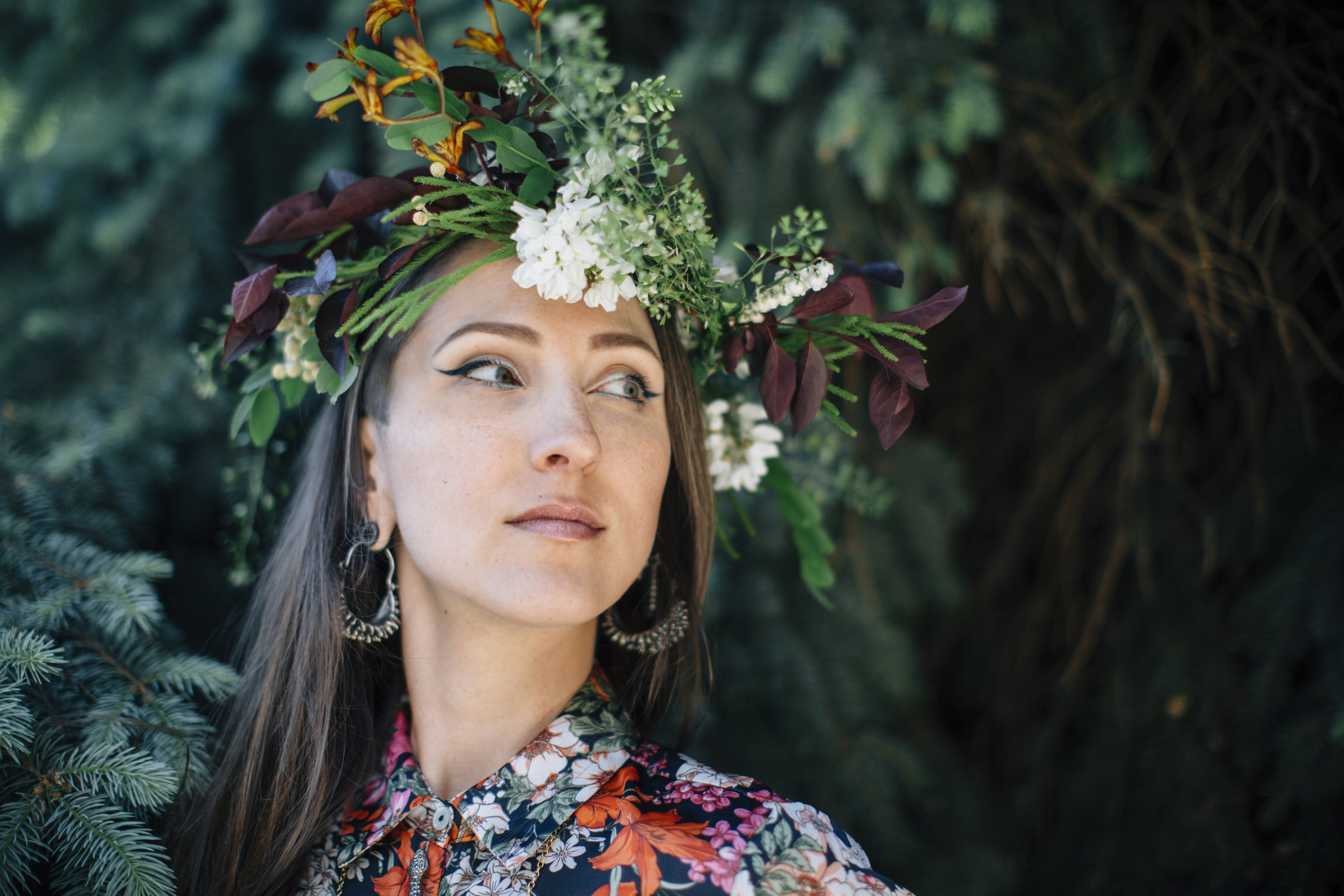
- Born: 1980 (age 45–46); New York City, U.S.
- Education: BFA, Maryland Institute College of Art (2002) MFA, School of the Art Institute of Chicago (2006)
- Occupations: Interdisciplinary Artist and Environmental Activist
- Years active: 2002–present
- Organization: Artists Commit
- Website: Official website

Jenny Kendler (born 1980) is an American interdisciplinary environmental artist, activist, naturalist, and wild forager who lives and works in Chicago. For the past 15 years her work has attempted to "re-story" the relationship between humanity and the natural world through projects on climate change, the biodiversity crisis, and de-centering the human in order to re-enchant our relationship to the natural world. She often collaborates with scientists and, in her work, bridges the gap between art, activism and ecology. Since 2014, Kendler has been the first Artist-in-Residence with the Natural Resources Defense Council (NRDC). Some notable projects include Music For Elephants, Tell it to the Birds', Sculpture---> Garden, One Hour of Birds and Milkweed Dispersal Balloons. In 2018, Kendler was part of a cross-disciplinary team that was awarded a major grant from the Andrew W. Mellon Foundation's Humanities Without Walls initiative to present her public art and community-engagement project Garden for a Changing Climate. Kendler is a co-founder of the artist website platform OtherPeoplesPixels, has served as a board member for several grass roots art organizations in Chicago, and was named one of Chicago's Top 50 Artists by Newcity in their biennial list in 2018 and 2020. She is also a founding member of Artists Commit, a successful artist-led initiative to raise climate-consciousness in the artworld.

== Education ==
Kendler's formal art studies began at the Maryland Institute College of Art where she graduated with a Bachelor of Fine Arts (summa cum laude) in 2002. Kendler continued her art education at the School of the Art Institute of Chicago, receiving a Master of Fine Arts in 2006. Upon completing her graduate studies, she remained in Chicago to build her studio practice.

== Career ==
=== Exhibitions ===
Kendler's work often takes the form of large-scale, often interactive, outdoor works or community co-created projects in 'unconventional' locations such as a Costa Rican tropical forest, an Arizona desert, a series of Chicago community gardens or in the fern room at the Lincoln Park Conservatory. She also presents exhibitions, projects and workshops at cultural venues including the Albright-Knox Art Gallery, the Pulitzer Arts Foundation, the Museum of Contemporary Art, Chicago, the Indianapolis Museum of Contemporary Art, the DePaul Art Museum, the Kochi-Muziris Biennale, the Chicago Biennial at the Elmhurst Art Museum, the Terrain Biennial Exit Art, the Arts Club of Chicago and at Storm King Art Center for their 2018 exhibition Indicators: Artists on Climate Change.

=== Residencies ===
Kendler has completed numerous artist residencies nationally including ACRE Residency in Steuben, Wisconsin in 2010, BOLT Residency at Chicago Artists' Coalition (CAC) in 2011–2012. Internationally she has completed residencies through the Pacific Foundation in Nosara, Costa Rica in 2016 and the Banff Centre for Arts and Creativity in Banff, Canada in 2018.

=== Museum exhibitions ===
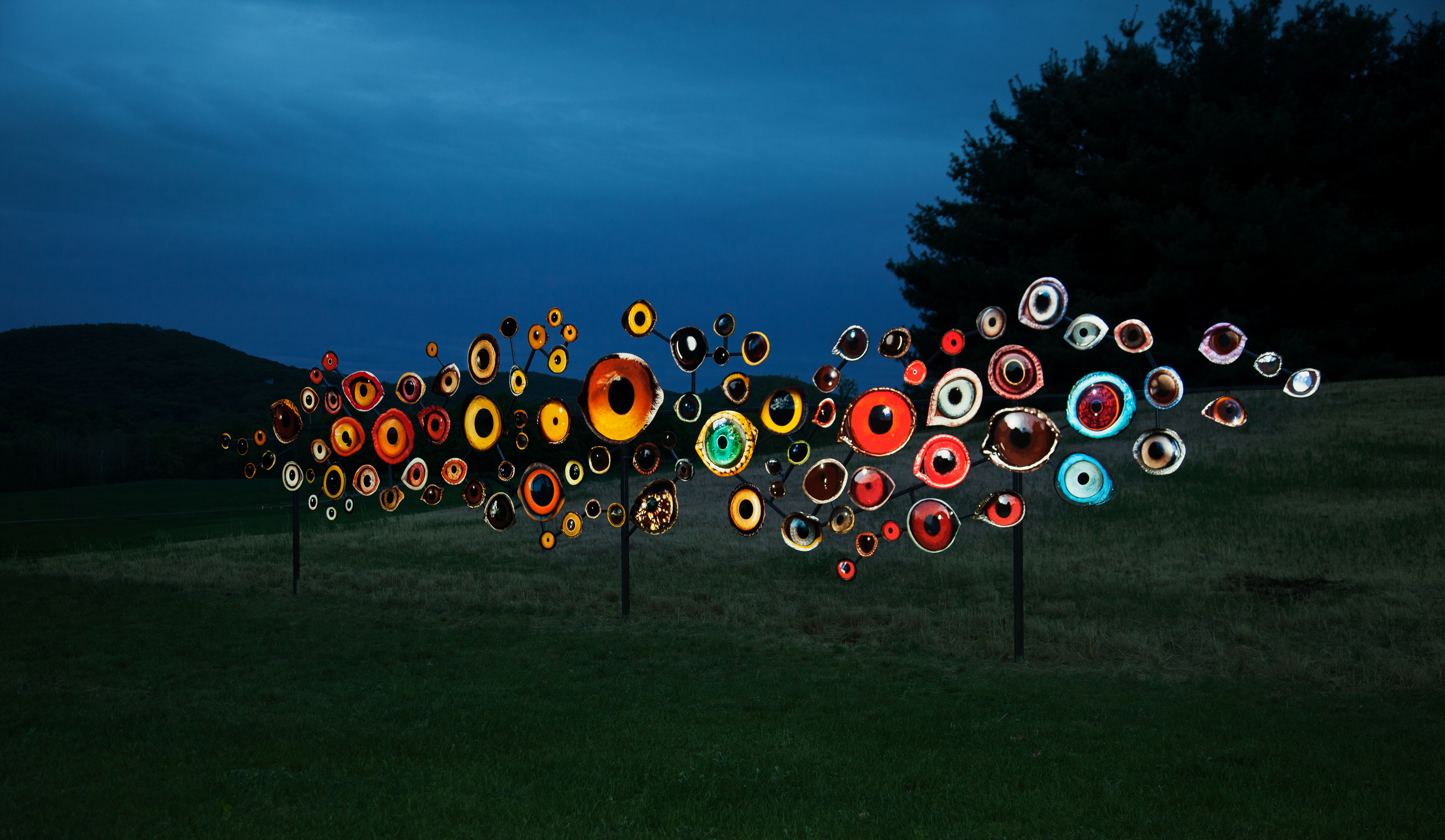
Jenny Kendler, Birds Watching, 2018 was originally created for Indicators: Artists on Climate Change at Storm King Art Center

Kendler opened her first solo museum exhibition, Jenny Kendler: The Long Goodbye, in January 2021 at the MSU Broad Museum. This exhibition includes works such as the Amber Archive and Forget Me Not that center on the notion of value and how we assign it, proposing that we move from capitalism's extractive modalities, towards valuing biodiversity itself. The curatorial statement included the following: "In creating the different “heirlooms and archives” on display, Kendler upends our expectations and invites us to reflect on our own values, and how they impact the health of the planet."

Kendler's work was included in the Museum of Contemporary Art Chicago's exhibition Water After All in 2019.

In 2023, Kendler participated in the climate-focused museum exhibition, Dear Earth: Art & Hope in a Time of Crisis at London's Hayward Gallery alongside artists such as Hito Steyerl, Otobong Nkanga and Cornelia Parker.

== Awards ==
- Named #36 in the biennial Art 50: Chicago’s Artists’ Artists / Newcity / 2020
- Named #47 in the biennial Art 50: Chicago's Artists’ Artists / Newcity / 2018
- NRDC Wildlife Opportunity Fund Grant / for Birds Watching at Storm King Art Center / 2018
- Andrew Mellon Foundation, Humanities Without Walls Grant / $140k for Garden for a Changing Climate in collaboration with Gallery 400 / 2017–2018
- Goethe Institute Chicago Grant / for Deep Time Chicago collective projects / 2016–2018
- Pacific Foundation Grant / for GREEN ZONES / 2015–2018
- Theo Westenberger Estate Foundation Arts & Environment Grant / 2015
- SxSW Eco 'Place by Design' Finalist for Field of Vision: A Garden for Others / Austin, TX / 2015
- Rauschenberg Foundation Grant / for Milkweed Dispersal Balloons / 2014
- Chicago Tribune ‘Best Photos of the Year’ / 2014
- Newcity Magazine's ‘Chicago’s Best Dressed Artist’ / 2013
- Gold Addy’ Award / for art for Center for Biological Diversity's Endangered Species / 2011
- Union League Civic and Arts Foundation Finalist Award / 2006

== Public and significant collections ==
Documentation from Jenny Kendler's 2021 solo exhibition, The Long Goodbye, at the Eli and Edythe Broad Art Museum

- Dom Museum Wien, Otto Mauer Contemporary (Vienna, Austria)
- The Nevada Museum of Art's Center for Art + Environment (Reno, NV, USA)
- Storm King Arts Center (New Windsor, New York, USA)
- The Eden Project (Cornwall, UK)
- DePaul Art Museum (Chicago, IL, USA)
- Victoria & Albert Museum, National Arts Library of London (London, UK)
- Brown University (Providence, RI, USA)
- Chicago Park District (Chicago, IL, USA)
- Yale University, Robert B. Haas Family Arts Library (New Haven, CT, USA)
- Tufts University (Medford, MA, USA)
- Albright-Knox Art Gallery (Buffalo, NY, USA)
- Swarthmore College (Swarthmore, PA, USA)
- Bernheim Arboretum & Research Forest (St. Louis, MO, USA)
- University of Illinois (IL, USA)
- The Joyce Foundation (Chicago, IL, USA)
