= Discrimination learning =

Ability to respond differently to different stimuli

Discrimination learning is defined in psychology as the ability to respond differently to different stimuli. This type of learning is used in studies regarding operant and classical conditioning. Operant conditioning involves the modification of a behavior by means of reinforcement or punishment. In this way, a discriminative stimulus will act as an indicator to when a behavior will persist and when it will not. Classical conditioning involves learning through association when two stimuli are paired together repeatedly. This conditioning demonstrates discrimination through specific micro-instances of reinforcement and non-reinforcement. This phenomenon is considered to be more advanced than learning styles such as generalization and yet simultaneously acts as a basic unit to learning as a whole. The complex and fundamental nature of discrimination learning allows for psychologists and researchers to perform more in-depth research that supports psychological advancements. Research on the basic principles underlying this learning style has their roots in neuropsychology sub-processes.

== Historical information ==
Karl Lashley, a psychologist who studied under John B. Watson, focused mainly on studying learning and discrimination. He published "Brain mechanisms and intelligence" in 1929. Lashey's research on two-alternative forced choice gave a foundation of study to psychologists like Kenneth Spence. Kenneth Spence expanded on the knowledge we had on two-choice discrimination learning. He made two major publications on the subject, The Nature of Discrimination Learning in Animals in 1936 and Continuous Versus Non-continuous Interpretations of Discrimination Learning in 1940. Spence's research discussed the theory that applying excitation and inhibition to a stimulus and having the likelihood of responding to that stimulus be the result of the net excitation strength (excitation minus inhibition).

Ivan Pavlov is very influential when it comes to studying discrimination learning. His studies involving salivating dogs demonstrated an ability in the dogs to differentiate a stimulus that would elicit a reward and a stimulus that would not. This can be contrasted with the Little Albert studies where Albert's lack of discrimination between animals exhibited the psychological and learning phenomenon of generalization learning, which is discrimination learning's polar opposite.

A book written on discrimination learning studied the behaviors and discriminatory habits of animals.

== Examples ==
Discrimination learning can be studied in both humans and other animals. Animals can use discrimination learning to help them survive, be trained for assisting humans in tasks, and much more. A dog might be trained to use discrimination learning to detect differences in complex odor compounds so that they are able to sniff out different drugs to assist police. Predator can also use discrimination learning to distinguish between two camouflaged prey. Discrimination learning teaches us more about what other animals are capable of conceptual thought. Humans can use discrimination learning to detect danger, learn about differences, and more. One example of discrimination learning in humans would be a baby who reacts differently to their mother's voice than to a stranger's voice.

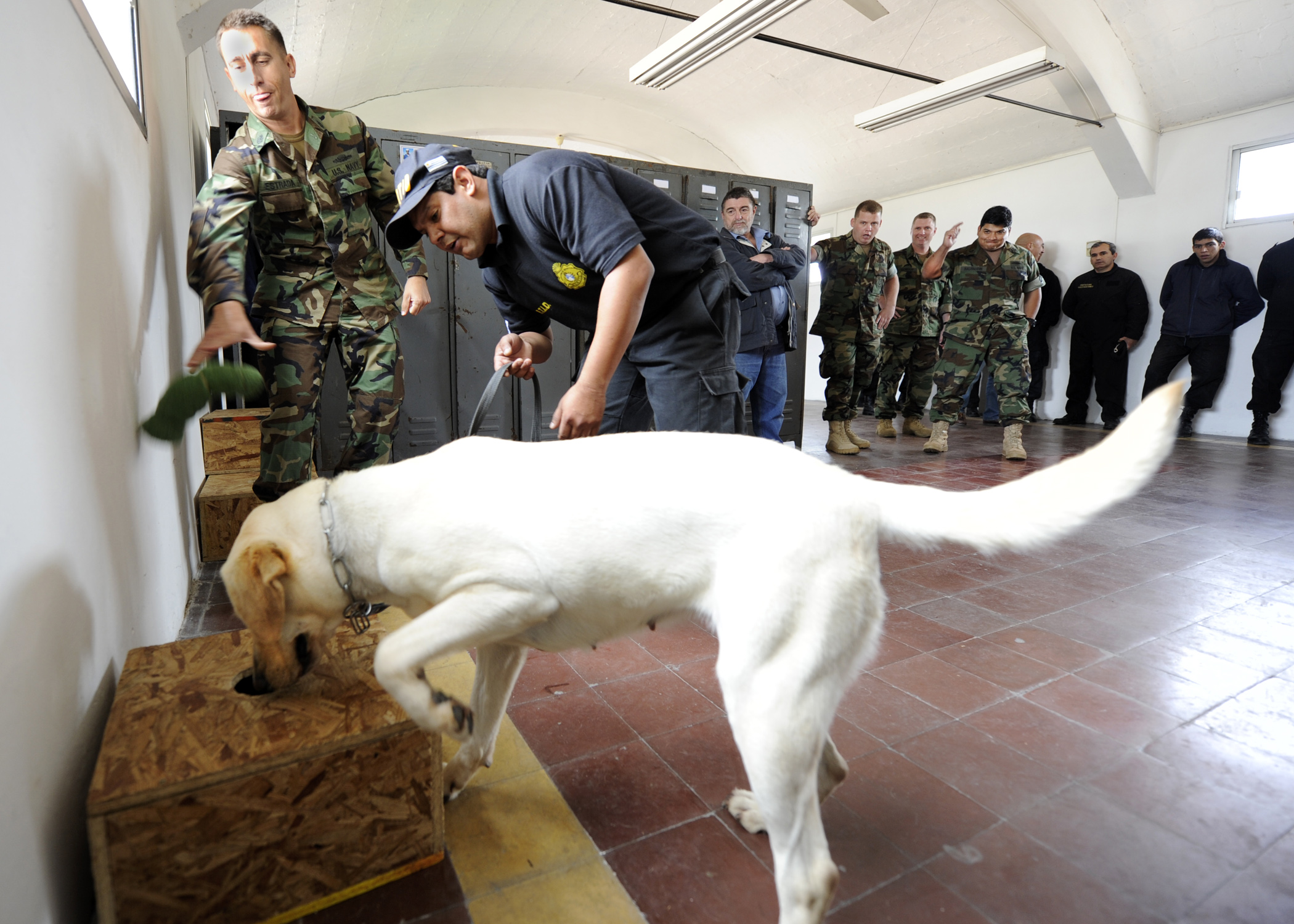
A dog being Trained for Drug Detection in US Navy.

Discovering different abilities of humans or other animals who are unable to communicate. Discrimination learning can be used to see what differences an animal will respond to. For example, since we are unable to have general two-way communication with dogs, we could show a dog two different stimuli that are the same in every way other than one, such as color. We could then use discrimination learning to see which colors a dog can discriminate between.

== Famous studies ==
Some famous studies using discrimination learning include:

- Natural concepts in pigeons by Hernstein RJ, Loveland DH, Cable C. A study in 1976 found that discrimination learning will occur when the stimuli is realistic but unfamiliar in the study using pigeons and fish.
- Watanabe study in 1995 found that pigeons are able to detect physical similarities during a study that was reinforcing monet paintings and not picasso paintings.

== Limitations ==
Discrimination learning has limitations. One limitation is the relative-validity effect. This effect states that organisms learn to give more attention to the stimuli that are of more importance to them. Another limitation is the blocking effect. This effect will occur if there is a discriminative stimulus, such as a cat hearing the sound of a bell ringing, that is presented by itself and then it is followed by a reinforcement, such as food for the cat. We would repeat this until the cat starts to salivate when the bell rings. If we then added a stimulus of a flash of light after the bell rings, and then followed it by a reinforcement (the cat food), it may result in little to no response to a second stimulus.

== Applications ==
Discrimination learning is used almost every subfield of psychology as it is a basic form of learning that is at the core of human intelligence. Examples of this include but are not limited to, cognitive psychology, personality psychology, developmental psychology, etc.

It was a classic topic in the psychology of learning from the 1920s to the 1970s, and was particularly investigated within:

- comparative psychology, where a key issue was whether continuous or discontinuous learning processes were concerned in the acquisition of discriminations
- human cognitive psychology
- the experimental analysis of behaviour, where a key issue was whether discriminations could be trained without the necessity for the subject to make errors
- developmental psychology, where a key issue was the changes that occur in the process of discrimination as a function of age
- cross-cultural psychology, where a key issue was the role that the cultural appropriateness of the stimuli to be discriminated played in the rate of acquisition of effective discrimination
- mathematical psychology, where attempts were made to formalise the distinctions being drawn in other branches of psychology.

Discrimination learning can almost become an unconscious process for many people. It becomes integrated into daily routines. Examples of discrimination learning in everyday life can include grocery shopping, determining how to decipher between the types of bread or fruit, being able to tell similar stimuli apart, differentiating between different parts while listening to music, or perhaps deciphering the different notes and chords being played.

While interest in the learning of discriminations has continued in many fields, from about 1980 onwards the phrase "discrimination learning" was used less often as the main description either of individual studies or of a field of investigation. Instead, investigations of the learning of discriminations have tended to be described in other terms such as pattern recognition or concept discrimination. This change partly reflects the increasing diversity of studies of discrimination, and partly the general expansion of the topic of cognition within psychology, so that learning is not now the central organizing topic that it was in the mid-20th century.
