= Social Science History Association =

Learned society devoted to interdisciplinary social scientific history

- Abbreviation: SSHA
- Formation: 1974
- Fields: history, sociology, political science, economics, anthropology
- President (2025-6): Ho-fung Hung
- Executive Director: Jeremy Land
- Website: ssha.org

The Social Science History Association brings together scholars from disciplines interested in interpreting history with social scientific approaches. The Social Science History Association's core purpose is: "To bring together members of various disciplines (including economics, sociology, demography, anthropology, and history) who work with historical materials."

The association publishes the journal Social Science History, a quarterly peer-reviewed academic publication. Its articles address historical evidence analytically, theoretically, and frequently quantitatively. The journal's founders intended to "improve the quality of historical explanation" with "theories and methods from the social science disciplines", and to make generalizations across historical cases. The first issue came out in the fall of 1976. The journal's articles that are most-accessed and cited through JSTOR are about social and political movements and associated narratives.

== History ==
The association was formed in 1974 as an interdisciplinary group with a journal Social Science History and an annual convention. The goal was to incorporate historical studies' perspectives from all the social sciences, especially political science, sociology and economics. The pioneers shared a commitment to quantification. However, by the 1980s critics complained that quantification undervalued the role of contingency and warned against naive positivism. Meanwhile, quantification became well-established inside economics in the field of cliometrics, as well as in political science. In history, quantification remained central to demographic studies, but slipped behind in political and social history.

The association is incorporated as a U.S. not-for-profit organization.

== Conference, prizes, and grants ==
The SSHA's annual conference is held in November of each year. The conference has grown to have about 200 sessions with over 600 presenters. Submissions are organized into about 18 topical "networks," most of which are interdisciplinary rather than organized in the standard categories of academic departments. Most sessions are organized in a decentralized way by a committee for each network, not by a unified program committee.

The SSHA awards prizes to the authors of notable publications. It awards travel grants for some doctoral students to attend the conference.

== See also ==
- Historiography, Quantification and new approaches to history
