= Kenneth Spence =

American psychologist (1907–1967)

Kenneth Wartinbee Spence
- Born: May 6, 1907; Chicago, Illinois, United States
- Died: January 12, 1967 (aged 59)
- Education: McGill University; Yale University
- Known for: Contiuous Account of Discrimination Learning; Hull-Spence Learning Theory
- Spouse: Janet Taylor Spence (m. 1960)
- Children: Bill
- Awards: 1929 Prince of Wales Gold Medal in Mental Sciences, McGill University 1930 Governor General's Medal for Research, McGill University; 1953 Howard Crosby Warren Medal, Society of Experimental Psychology; 1955 Yale University Silliman Lectures 1956 First Distinguished Scientific Contribution Award, American Psychological Association
- Scientific career
- Fields: Psychology
- Workplaces: University of Virginia; University of Iowa; University of Texas
- Doctoral advisor: Robert M. Yerkes

Kenneth Wartinbee Spence (May 6, 1907 – January 12, 1967) was a prominent American psychologist known for both his theoretical and experimental contributions to learning theory and motivation. As one of the leading theorists of his time, Spence was the most cited psychologist in the 14 most influential psychology journals in the last six years of his life (1962 – 1967). A Review of General Psychology survey, published in 2002, ranked Spence as the 62nd most cited psychologist of the 20th century.

== Personal history ==
Spence was born in Chicago on May 6, 1907. In 1911, Spence's father, an electrical engineer, moved the family to Montreal, Quebec, Canada when transferred by his employer, Western Electric. Spence spent his youth and adolescence there, attending West Hill High School in Notre Dame de Grace. While in high school, Spence was involved in basketball, tennis and track.

Spence sustained a back injury during a track competition while attending McGill University. As part of his physical therapy, Spence moved to live with his grandmother in LaCrosse, Wisconsin. There, Spence attended LaCrosse Teacher's College and majored in Physical Education, and met his future wife Isabel Temte. He and Isabel had two children, Shirley Ann Spence Pumroy and William James Spence. Spence and Isabel later divorced, and Spence was remarried to Janet A. Taylor, his graduate student, in 1960.

Spence eventually returned to McGill University and changed his major to psychology. He received his B.A. in 1929, and M.A. in 1930. After McGill, Spence attended Yale University as a research assistant to Robert M. Yerkes. Yerkes sponsored his dissertation, a study on the visual acuity of chimpanzees. Spence received his PhD from Yale in 1933.

While at Yale, Spence collaborated with Walter Shipley to test Clark L. Hull's blind alley maze learning in rats, a contribution which led to further publications while pursuing his PhD. Spence applied to a postdoctoral fellowship to study mathematics after the completion of his graduate training, but his application was rejected by a biologist on the grounds that psychology would never reach a level of precision to require sophisticated mathematical knowledge.

== Professional contributions ==
=== Discrimination learning ===
After his PhD, Spence accepted a position as National Research Council at Yale Laboratories of Primate Biology in Orange Park, Florida from 1933 to 1937. There, Spence examined discrimination learning in chimpanzees. From this and further research, Spence developed the continuous learning account of two-choice discrimination learning in rats. As reported by Lashley (1929), rats in a two-choice discrimination task demonstrated an extended period of chance performance, followed by a sudden leap to a high percentage of accurate responding. Lashley explained this phenomenon by suggesting that the rat's essential learning emerged from testing and confirming the correct hypothesis "during the rapidly changing portion of the function, with the practice preceding and the errors following being irrelevant to the final solution." In contrast, Spence proposed that essential learning was produced through increases in the excitatory tendencies of task-relevant characteristics of the display, and decreases in inhibitory tendencies of the non-relevant characteristics of the display – a continuous learning account not directly detected by the choice measure.

=== Motivation ===
Spence moved to the University of Iowa in 1938, and was appointed to the head of the psychology department in 1942. There, Spence established an eyelid-conditioning lab to study the influence of motivation on classical conditioning, and contributed to Clark Hull's seminal Principles of Behavior book. Like Hull, Spence believed learning was the result of the interaction between drive and incentive motivation. Unlike Hull, Spence's formulation summed drive (D) and incentive motivation (K) instead of multiplying them. This allowed Spence "to show that increasing motivational level will facilitate performance on tasks in which the correct, to-be-learned response is stronger than those of other response-tendencies elicited by a stimulus, but will deter performance on tasks in which the habit-strength of the correct response is initially weaker than those of competing response-tendencies. He showed also that the mathematical form of the curves obtained when probability of the conditioned response is plotted against successive presentations of the paired stimulus changes systematically with motivational level." Spence believed that differences in motivation were attributable to internal emotional responses created by an intraorganic brain mechanism.

Spence's contributions to Hull's Principles of Behavior are commemorated in the book's foreword, where Hull stated: "To Kenneth L. Spence I owe a debt of gratitude which cannot adequately be indicated in this place; from the time when the ideas here put forward were in the process of incubation in my graduate seminar and later when the present work was being planned, on through its many revisions, Dr. Spence has contributed generously and effectively with suggestions and criticisms, large numbers of which have been utilized without indication of their origin." The variable for incentive motivation (K) was said to have been chosen in honor of Kenneth Spence.

=== Teaching ===
Spence directed a total of 75 PhD theses, producing faculty members in every major psychology department in the United States. Students of Spence at Iowa referred to their degrees as PhDs in "theoretical-experimental psychology" due to Spence's emphasis on methodological rigor.

== Influential publications ==
=== Discrimination learning ===
- The Nature of Discrimination Learning in Animals, 1936.
- The Differential Response in Animals to Stimuli Varying Within a Single Dimension, 1937.
- Continuous Versus Non-continuous Interpretations of Discrimination Learning, 1940.

=== Theoretical ===
- The Nature of Theory Construction in Contemporary Psychology, 1944.
- The Postulates and Methods of Behaviorism, 1948.
- Theoretical Interpretations of Learning, 1951.
- Mathematical Formulations of Learning Phenomena, 1952.
- Behavior Theory and Conditioning, 1956.

=== Eyelid conditioning ===
- Anxiety and Strength of the UCS as Determiners of the Amount of Eyelid Conditioning, 1951.
- Cognitive and Drive Factors in the Extinction of the Conditioned Eyeblink in Human Subjects, 1966.
