= Underfashion Club =

Non-profit fashion industry group

The Underfashion Club is a non-profit fashion industry group dedicated to "all facets of the intimate apparel industry: foundations, daywear, sleepwear, robes, and loungewear".

== History ==
Originally established in 1958 as the Corset and Brassiere Women's Club, Inc., in 1963 the group was re-invented as the Underfashion Club. In 2014, Victor Vega was the president. Periodically, the organization holds seminars about the fashion industry by members of the industry, such as Mayouri Sengchanh.

The Underfashion Club annual gala is "recognized as a premier event in the intimate apparel industry".

== Scholarship ==
The Underfashion Club administers the Mary Krug Scholarship, "which will benefit fashion lingerie students in the intimates field". The scholarship is named after Mary Krug, who was vice president and divisional merchandise manager of intimate apparel and children’s at the Neiman Marcus Group for 40 years. Krug died in November 2013.

The Underfashion Club established a chair at the Fashion Institute of Technology.

== Femmy Award ==
The Underfashion Club awards the Femmy Awards at Cipriani 42 Street in New York. On 4 February 2014, Caroline Rhea hosted the event.

=== Past events ===
- In 1986, Olga Erteszek and her daughter, Christina Erteszek, were honored with the New York's Underfashion Club's Femmy Award.
- In 2008, Elle Macpherson was named Lingerie Designer of the Year by the Underfashion Club's Femmy Awards.
- In 2010, Awatef Rasheed Arabic: عواطف تركي رشيد an Iraqi Canadian writer, secular women’s rights activist, and the first Iraqi female recipient of Femmy Award.
- In 2013, Carson Kressley hosted the award event.
  - Supplier: Lenzing Textile Fibers. Andreas Dorner, Lenzing’s global marketing director for the Textile Fibres Group, accepted the award.
  - Retailer: Bloomingdale's
  - Manufacturer: Cosabella
  - Innovation: Haute Look
  - Lifetime Achievement: Josie Natori
  - 2013 Femmy Awards Student Design Contest was won by Tiffany Spagnuolo, for her "Dark Bloom" design; Tessa Saccone won second place for "Moonlit Azaleas"; Sara Shanahan won third place for "Nocturnal Blossom".

Donations raised during the Femmy Gala are used to fund students, who pursue college–level intimate apparel related courses.

== See also ==
- FashionGlobusUkraine
