= Fashion Star season 1 =

Fashion Star
- Season 1

Release
- Original network: NBC
- Original release: March 13 – May 15, 2012

Season chronology
- Next → Season 2

The first season of Fashion Star, appeared on NBC beginning on March 13, 2012 with 14 designers competing to become a "Fashion Star". The season was presented by Elle Macpherson. Celebrity mentors were Jessica Simpson, Nicole Richie, and John Varvatos. The buyers were Caprice Willard for Macy's, Terron Schaefer for Saks Fifth Avenue, and Nicole M. Christie for H&M.

== Designers ==
Designer	Age	Place of residence	Finish position
Kara Laricks	38	New York City, New York	Winner
Ronnie Escalante	32	San Francisco, California	Runner-Up
Nzimiro Oputa	28	New York City, New York	Runner-Up
Orly Shani	26	New York City, New York	4th
Luciana Scarabello	30	Miami, Florida	5th
Nikki Poulos	43	Delray Beach, Florida	6th
Ross Bennett	27	Austin, Texas	7th
Sarah Parrott	31	Marietta, Georgia	8th
Barbara Bates	55	Chicago, Illinois	9th
Edmond Newton	32	Atlanta, Georgia	10th
Lisa Vian Hunter	47	Mercer Island, Washington	11th
Lizzie Parker	41	Seattle, Washington	12th
Oscar Fierro	37	Lewisville, Texas	13th
Nicholas Bowes	38	Los Angeles, California	14th

== Season progress ==
Elimination Chart
Designer	1	2	3	4	5	6	7	8	9	Finale	Money Earned
Kara	BTM 2	SOLD^{2}	SOLD	SOLD	SAFE	SOLD	SOLD	SOLD	ADV^{1}^{3}^{4}	WINNER	$6,630,000
Ronnie	SAFE	SAFE	SAFE	SAVED	SOLD^{1}	SOLD	SOLD	SOLD^{3}	ADV	RUNNER-UP	$420,000
Nzimiro	SOLD^{3}	SOLD^{1}	SOLD	SAFE	SAFE	SOLD	SAVED	SOLD	BTM 4	RUNNER-UP	$320,000
Luciana	SAFE	SAFE	BTM 2	SOLD^{2}	SOLD	SOLD^{1}	SOLD^{3}^{4}	SOLD	OUT		$380,000
Orly	SOLD^{2}	SAFE	SOLD	SAFE	BTM 2	BTM 3	SOLD^{3}	BTM 3	OUT		$430,000
Nikkie	SOLD^{1}	SAFE	SOLD	SOLD^{3}	SOLD	SAVED	BTM 3	BTM 3	OUT^{3}^{4}		$300,000
Ross	SAFE	SAVED	SOLD^{1}	SAFE	SOLD	SOLD^{3}	BTM 3	OUT			$220,000
Sarah	SOLD^{3}	SOLD	SOLD	SOLD	SOLD	BTM 3	OUT				$300,000
Barbara	SAFE	SAFE	SAFE	SOLD^{1}	SAVED	OUT					$50,000
Edmond	SOLD^{1}	SAFE	SAVED	BTM 2	OUT						$60,000
Lisa Vian	SAFE	SOLD^{1}	SAFE	OUT							$50,000
Lizzie	SOLD^{1}	BTM 2	OUT								$60,000
Oscar	SAVED	OUT									$0
Nicholas	OUT										$0

^1 Contestant sold to Macy's for the first time.
^2 Contestant sold to Saks for the first time.
^3 Contestant sold to H&M for the first time.
^4 Contestant has sold to all three buyers.

Results
Blue background and ADV means that the designer made a sale and advanced to the final.
Dark blue background and WINNER means that the designer advanced to the final and won the competition.
Green background and SOLD means that the designer made a sale and was safe for the week.
Lime green background and RUNNER-UP means that the designer advanced to the final, but did not win the competition.
Gold background and SAVED means that the designer was one of the bottom three/four designers for the week, but was saved by the mentors.
Olive background and BTM 4 means that the designer did not make a sale, but still advanced to the final.
Orange background and BTM 2/3 means that the designer was one of the bottom two/three designers for the week, but was not eliminated.
Red background and OUT means that the designer did not make a sale and was eliminated from the competition.
Dark red background and OUT means that the designer made a sale, but was still eliminated from the competition.

== Episodes ==
=== Episode 1: Pilot ===
Original Airdate: March 13, 2012

In their first challenge, the designers will be asked to design and create their signature items. After an exhilarating trip down the runway, the retailers will make on-the-spot decisions as they vie for the right to purchase and exclusively carry the work of the up-and-coming designers each week.

Buyers	Contestants													
Buyers	Lisa	Ronnie	Kara	Oscar	Ross	Orly	Nikki	Edmond	Luciana	Nzimiro	Lizzie	Sarah	Barbara	Nicholas
Macy's	No offer	No offer	No offer	No offer	No offer	$50,000	$50,000	$60,000	No offer	No offer	$60,000	No offer	No offer	No offer
Saks Fifth Avenue	No offer	No offer	No offer	No offer	No offer	$80,000	No offer	No offer	No offer	No offer	$50,000	No offer	No offer	No offer
H&M	No offer	No offer	No offer	No offer	No offer	No offer	No offer	No offer	No offer	$50,000	No offer	$80,000	No offer	No offer

- Top sale: $80,000 (Orly for Saks Fifth Avenue & Sarah for H&M)
- Out: Nicholas Bowes

=== Episode 2: Who's Your Customer ===
Original Airdate: March 20, 2012

The clothiers hear the demands and needs of their customers. They are given a retail space and then must decide whether to showcase their customers' favorite pieces or go with their own choice of designs.

Buyers	Contestants												
Buyers	Lisa	Ronnie	Kara	Oscar	Ross	Orly	Nikki	Edmond	Luciana	Nzimiro	Lizzie	Sarah	Barbara
Macy's	$50,000	No offer	No offer	No offer	No offer	No offer	No offer	No offer	No offer	$70,000	No offer	No offer	No offer
Saks Fifth Avenue	No offer	No offer	$110,000	No offer	No offer	No offer	No offer	No offer	No offer	$50,000	No offer	No offer	No offer
H&M	No offer	No offer	$100,000	No offer	No offer	No offer	No offer	No offer	No offer	$70,000	No offer	$50,000	No offer

- Top Sale: $110,000 (Kara for Saks Fifth Avenue)
- Out: Oscar Fierro

=== Episode 3: Here Comes Summer ===
Original Airdate: March 27, 2012

The remaining 12 designers look into the future to create a summer trend for their brand. First the designers meet with trend reporters from Macy's, H&M and Saks Fifth Avenue to learn the fashion summer forecast. For the challenge, the designers must create a look that incorporates the summer trends. Some will win big, while others will miss the mark and leave the mentors wondering who they are as a designer. The winning creations will be available online immediately and in stores the following day.

Buyers	Contestants											
Buyers	Lisa	Ronnie	Kara	Ross	Orly	Nikki	Edmond	Luciana	Nzimiro	Lizzie	Sarah	Barbara
Macy's	No offer	No offer	No offer	$120,000	$110,000	$50,000	No offer	No offer	No offer	No offer	No offer	No offer
Saks Fifth Avenue	No offer	No offer	$50,000	No offer	$120,000	No offer	No offer	No offer	No offer	No offer	No offer	No offer
H&M	No offer	No offer	No offer	$100,000	No offer	No offer	No offer	No offer	$50,000	No offer	$50,000	No offer

- Top Sale: $120,000 (Orly for Saks Fifth Avenue & Ross for Macy's)
- Out: Lizzie Parker

=== Episode 4: High-End Appeal/Mass Market Appeal ===
Original Airdate: April 3, 2012

The designers present two variations on a look: high-end couture and mass market.

Buyers	Contestants										
Buyers	Lisa	Ronnie	Kara	Ross	Orly	Nikki	Edmond	Luciana	Nzimiro	Sarah	Barbara
Macy's	No offer	No offer	$60,000	No offer	No offer	No offer	No offer	$50,000	No offer	No offer	$50,000
Saks Fifth Avenue	No offer	No offer	$70,000	No offer	No offer	$60,000	No offer	$60,000	No offer	No offer	No offer
H&M	No offer	No offer	No offer	No offer	No offer	$70,000	No offer	No offer	No offer	$60,000	No offer

- Top Sale: $70,000 (Kara for Saks Fifth Avenue & Nikki for H&M)
- Out: Lisa Vian Hunter

=== Episode 5: Living Department Store Window ===
Original Airdate: April 10, 2012

The designers are faced with the challenge of using live models in a blank window space to feature their collections. The window will come to life on the "Fashion Star" stage. The designers who do not get bids from the retailers will find themselves on the brink of elimination.

Buyers	Contestants									
Buyers	Ronnie	Kara	Ross	Orly	Nikki	Edmond	Luciana	Nzimiro	Sarah	Barbara
Macy's	$110,000	No offer	$50,000	No offer	No offer	No offer	No offer	No offer	No offer	No offer
Saks Fifth Avenue	No offer	No offer	No offer	No offer	$70,000	No offer	$100,000	No offer	No offer	No offer
H&M	$90,000	No offer	No offer	No offer	$80,000	No offer	No offer	No offer	$60,000	No offer

- Top Sale: $110,000 (Ronnie for Macy's)
- Out: Edmond Newton

=== Episode 6: Out of the Box ===
Original Airdate: April 17, 2012

The remaining designers are challenged to expand their brands by creating clothes outside of their comfort zones. A women's designer struggles with how to properly construct a men's garment. Meanwhile, one of the designers adds a sexy edge to his collection. In a twist, the mentors and buyers will not know whose designs they are watching as they bid on their favorite pieces.

Buyers	Contestants								
Buyers	Ronnie	Kara	Ross	Orly	Nikki	Luciana	Nzimiro	Sarah	Barbara
Macy's	$50,000	No offer	No offer	No offer	No offer	$100,000	No offer	No offer	No offer
Saks Fifth Avenue	No offer	$100,000	No offer	No offer	No offer	$80,000	No offer	No offer	No offer
H&M	No offer	No offer	$50,000	No offer	No offer	No offer	$50,000	No offer	No offer

- Top Sale: $100,000 (Kara for Saks Fifth Avenue & Luciana for Macy's)
- Out: Barbara Bates

=== Episode 7: Mentor's Choice ===
Original Airdate: April 24, 2012

The remaining designers are paired off with celebrity mentors Jessica Simpson, Nicole Richie and John Varvatos. This episode the mentors must decide what each designer will create.

Buyers	Contestants							
Buyers	Ronnie	Kara	Ross	Orly	Nikki	Luciana	Nzimiro	Sarah
Macy's	$50,000	No offer	No offer	No offer	No offer	No offer	No offer	No offer
Saks Fifth Avenue	No offer	$100,000	No offer	$70,000	No offer	$60,000	No offer	No offer
H&M	No offer	No offer	No offer	$70,000	No offer	$70,000	No offer	No offer

- Top Sale: $100,000 (Kara for Saks Fifth Avenue)
- Out: Sarah Parrott

=== Episode 8: What's Your Campaign? ===
Original Airdate: May 1, 2012

The designers are tasked with creating a brand campaign for their collections. Celebrity mentors Jessica Simpson, Nicole Richie and John Varvatos work directly with the designers to provide insight into what makes a successful imaging campaign.

Buyers	Contestants						
Buyers	Ronnie	Kara	Ross	Orly	Nikki	Luciana	Nzimiro
Macy's	No offer	No offer	No offer	No offer	No offer	No offer	$100,000
Saks Fifth Avenue	No offer	$80,000	No offer	No offer	No offer	$50,000	No offer
H&M	$50,000	$70,000	No offer	No offer	No offer	No offer	No offer

- Top Sale: $100,000 (Nzimiro for Macy's)
- Out: Ross Bennett

=== Episode 9: Buyer's Choice ===
Original Airdate: May 8, 2012

In one of the biggest challenges of the competition, the buyer from Macy's, H&M and Saks Fifth Avenue ask the designers to create a piece for their store that they believe is missing from each of the designers' collections. In a twist, it is discovered that receiving a purchase from the retailers does not necessarily ensure the designers' safety from elimination. In the end, three designers who fail to impress the retailers will be sent home.

Buyers	Contestants											
Buyers	Ronnie		Kara		Orly		Nikki		Luciana		Nzimiro	
Buyers	1st sale	2nd sale	1st sale	2nd sale	1st sale	2nd sale	1st sale	2nd sale	1st sale	2nd sale	1st sale	2nd sale
Macy's	$50,000	No offer	$60,000	$60,000	No offer	No offer	No offer	$50,000	No offer	No offer	No offer	No offer
Saks Fifth Avenue	No offer	$100,000	No offer	$50,000	$60,000	No offer	No offer	$50,000	No offer	No offer	No offer	No offer
H&M	No offer	$110,000	$60,000	No offer	No offer	$100,000	No offer	No offer	No offer	No offer	No offer	No offer

- Top Sale: $110,000 (Ronnie for H&M)
- Out: Nikki Poulos, Orly Shani, Luciana Scarabello

=== Episode 10: Finale ===
Original Airdate: May 15, 2012

The remaining three contestants are tasked with creating separate showcases consisting of three garments for each of the retailers. The designer that can meet the needs of Macy's, H&M and Saks Fifth Avenue will be named America's first "Fashion Star" and receive a capsule collection in each of the stores.

- Winner: Kara Laricks
- Runners-up: Ronnie Escalante & Nzimiro Oputa

== Ratings ==
#	Episode	Air date	18–49 (rating/share)	Viewers (million)
1	"Pilot"	March 13, 2012	1.6/4	4.58
2	"Who's Your Customer"	March 20, 2012	1.8/5	4.76
3	"Here Comes Summer"	March 27, 2012	1.5/4	4.00
4	"High End Appeal/Mass Market Appeal"	April 3, 2012	1.5/4	4.11
5	"Living Department Store Window"	April 10, 2012	1.8/5	4.66
6	"Out of the Box"	April 17, 2012	1.5/4	4.46
7	"Mentor's Choice"	April 24, 2012	1.5/4	4.59
8	"What's Your Campaign?"	May 1, 2012	1.5/4	4.23
9	"Buyer's Choice"	May 8, 2012	1.3/4	4.30
10	"Finale"	May 15, 2012	1.6/4	4.81
