= Fashion Star season 2 =

Fashion Star
- Season 2

Release
- Original network: NBC
- Original release: March 8 – May 10, 2013

Season chronology
- ← Previous; Season 1

Fashion Star Season 2 is the second and final season of the television show Fashion Star, appearing on NBC. The season began airing on March 8, 2013, with 13 designers competing to become "Fashion Star". The season is presented by Louise Roe who replaced Elle Macpherson. Celebrity mentors were Jessica Simpson, Nicole Richie, and John Varvatos. The buyers are Caprice Willard for Macy's, Terron Schaefer for Saks Fifth Avenue, and Erika DeSalvatore for Express.

Unlike the first season, this season the mentors focused on four designers each.

== Designers ==
Designer	Age	Place of Residence	Finish Position
Hunter Bell	32	Florence, South Carolina	1st
Cassandra Hobbins	31	Edmonton, Canada	2nd
Daniel Silverstein	24	Brooklyn, New York	3rd
Garrett Gerson; JesseRay Vasquez	32; 28	Malibu, California	4th
Silvia Argüello	38	Milan, Italy	5th
Johana Hernandez	26	Compton, California	6th
Amber Perley	30	Austin, Texas	7th
Brandon Scott		Los Angeles, California	8th
Priscilla Barroso	31	Austin, Texas	9th
David Appel		Los Angeles, California	10th
Tori Nichel		New York City, New York	11th
Bret Young	37	Los Angeles, California	12th

=== Season progress ===
Elimination Chart
Designer	1	2	3	4	5	6	7	8	9	Finale	Money Earned
Hunter Bell	SOLD^{2}	SOLD^{3}	SOLD	SOLD^{1}^{4}	SOLD	SOLD	SOLD	BTM2	SOLD	WINNER	$4,160,000
Cassandra Hobbins	SAFE	SOLD^{2}	SOLD^{3}	SOLD	SOLD^{1}^{4}	SOLD	BTM 2	SOLD	SOLD	RUNNER UP	$695,000
Daniel Silverstein	SOLD^{2}	SOLD^{1}	SAFE	SAFE	SOLD	BTM 3	SOLD^{3}^{4}	SOLD	SOLD	2ND RUNNER UP	$925,000
Garrett Gerson; JesseRay Vasquez	BTM 2	SOLD^{1}	SOLD^{2}	SOLD	SOLD	BTM 3	SOLD^{3}^{4}	SOLD	OUT		$695,000
Silvia Argüello	SOLD^{2}	SOLD	SOLD^{1}	SOLD	SOLD^{3}^{4}	SOLD	SOLD	OUT			$855,000
Johana Hernandez	SOLD^{1}	SOLD^{3}	BTM 3	SOLD	SOLD^{2}^{4}	SOLD	OUT				$670,000
Amber Perley	SOLD^{3}	SOLD	SOLD^{2}	BTM 2	BTM 2	OUT					$440,000
Brandon Scott	SOLD^{1}	SAFE	SOLD	SOLD^{3}	OUT						$300,000
Priscilla Barroso	SOLD^{1}	SAFE	BTM 3	OUT							$80,000
David Appel	SAFE	BTM 2	OUT								$0
Tori Nichel	SAFE	OUT									$0
Bret Young	OUT										$0

^1 Contestant sold to Macy's for the first time.
^2 Contestant sold to Saks for the first time.
^3 Contestant sold to Express for the first time.
^4 Contestant has sold to all three buyers.

Legend
Lavender background means that the designer is part of team Nicole
Brown background means that the designer is part of team Jessica
Gray background means that the designer is part of team John
Results
Blue background and ADV means that the designer made a sale and advanced to the final.
Dark blue background and WINNER means that the designer advanced to the final and won the competition.
Green background and SOLD means that the designer made a sale and was safe for the week.
Plum background and 2ND RUNNER-UP means that the designer advanced to the final, but did not win the competition.
Lime green background and RUNNER-UP means that the designer advanced to the final, but did not win the competition.
Gold background and SAVED means that the designer was one of the bottom three/four designers for the week, but was saved by the mentors.
Orange background and BTM 2/3 means that the designer was one of the bottom two/three designers for the week, but was not eliminated.
Coral background and OUT means that the designer did not make a sale and was eliminated from the competition.
Fuchsia background and BTM2 means that the designer made a sale, but was still put up for the bottom two.
Red background and OUT means that the designer made a sale, but was eliminated.

== Episodes ==
=== Episode 1: Showstoppers ===
Original Airdate: March 8, 2013

In their first challenge, the designers will be asked to design and create a must-have, one-of-a-kind show-stopping garment!

Buyers	Contestants											
Buyers	Team Nicole				Team John				Team Jessica			
Buyers	Priscilla	Johana	Daniel	Bret	Silvia	Amber	Cassandra	Brandon	Tori	Hunter	Garrett; JesseRay	David
Macy's	$80,000	$55,000	No offer	No offer	No offer	$70,000	No offer	$120,000	No offer	$50,000	No offer	No offer
Saks Fifth Avenue	No offer	No offer	$150,000	No offer	$75,000	$75,000	No offer	No offer	No offer	$200,000	No offer	No offer
Express	No offer	$50,000	No offer	No offer	No offer	$175,000	No offer	No offer	No offer	$200,000	No offer	No offer

- Top sale: $200,000 (Hunter for Saks Fifth Avenue)
- Out: Bret Young

=== Episode 2: Sex Sells ===
Original Airdate: March 15, 2013

If there's one known in fashion, it's that sex sells, so this week, the designers are being challenged to create their sexiest piece.

Buyers	Contestants										
Buyers	Team Nicole			Team John				Team Jessica			
Buyers	Priscilla	Johana	Daniel	Silvia	Amber	Cassandra	Brandon	Tori	Hunter	Garrett; JesseRay	David
Macy's	No offer	$110,000	$95,000	No offer	No offer	No offer	No offer	No offer	No offer	$140,000	No offer
Saks Fifth Avenue	No offer	No offer	No offer	$50,000	No offer	$55,000	No offer	No offer	$50,000	$50,000	No offer
Express	No offer	$125,000	$60,000	No offer	$60,000	No offer	No offer	No offer	$75,000	$125,000	No offer

- Top sale: $140,000 (Garrett & JesseRay for Macy's)
- Out: Tori Nichel

=== Episode 3: Something for Everyone ===
Original Airdate: March 22, 2013

This week's challenge: the mentors are helping their teams create pieces that fit every body type.

Buyers	Contestants									
Buyers	Team Nicole			Team John				Team Jessica		
Buyers	Priscilla	Johana	Daniel	Silvia	Amber	Cassandra	Brandon	Hunter	Garrett; JesseRay	David
Macy's	No offer	No offer	No offer	$80,000	No offer	$100,000	$80,000	No offer	$50,000	No offer
Saks Fifth Avenue	No offer	No offer	No offer	No offer	$55,000	No offer	No offer	No offer	$55,000	No offer
Express	No offer	No offer	No offer	No offer	$50,000	$110,000	$75,000	$60,000	No offer	No offer

- Top sale: $110,000 (Cassandra for Express)
- Out: David Appel

=== Episode 4: It's Getting Hot in Here ===
Original Airdate: March 29, 2013

The designers must work in teams to create unique summer looks for the Macy's, Saks and Express buyers. Team John chose Tropical Paradise, Team Jessica chose Pool Party, and Team Nicole chose Summer in the City as their design themes.

Buyers	Contestants								
Buyers	Team Nicole			Team John				Team Jessica	
Buyers	Priscilla	Johana	Daniel	Silvia	Amber	Cassandra	Brandon	Hunter	Garrett; JesseRay
Macy's	No offer	$80,000	No offer	$50,000	No offer	No offer	No offer	$110,000	$60,000
Saks Fifth Avenue	No offer	$55,000	No offer	$75,000	No offer	$55,000	No offer	$100,000	$55,000
Express	No offer	$100,000	No offer	No offer	No offer	$75,000	$50,000	No offer	No offer

- Top sale: $110,000 (Hunter for Macy's)
- Out: Priscilla Barroso

=== Episode 5: It Takes Two ===
Original Airdate: April 5, 2013

The remaining designers must work in pairs for the upcoming challenge to create one cohesive look from two separate garments despite style and personality clashes; the pair with the highest bid from the buyers are granted immunity from elimination.

Buyers	Contestants							
Buyers	Team Nicole		Team John				Team Jessica	
Buyers	Johana	Daniel	Silvia	Amber	Cassandra	Brandon	Hunter	Garrett; JesseRay
Macy's	$120,000	$50,000	No offer	No offer	$70,000	$50,000	No offer	$50,000
Saks Fifth Avenue	$175,000	$180,000	$70,000	$150,000	No offer	No offer	No offer	No offer
Express	No offer	No offer	$100,000	$50,000	No offer	No offer	$55,000	No offer
Combined	$355,000		$250,000		$120,000		$105,000	

- Top sale: $180,000 (Daniel for Saks)
- Top team: $355,000 (Daniel and Johana for Saks)
- Out: Brandon Scott

=== Episode 6: Buyer's Choice ===
Original Airdate: April 12, 2013

The buyers step in to work one-on-one with the remaining designers to help guide them in the process of preparing new pieces; after consultations with the buyers, some designers are left reeling and worried about what they're looking for.

Buyers	Contestants						
Buyers	Team Nicole		Team John			Team Jessica	
Buyers	Johana	Daniel	Silvia	Amber	Cassandra	Hunter	Garrett; JesseRay
Macy's	$165,000	No offer	No offer	No offer	$175,000	$200,000	No offer
Saks Fifth Avenue	No offer	No offer	$200,000	No offer	No offer	No offer	No offer
Express	$160,000	No offer	$55,000	No offer	$150,000	$175,000	No offer

- Top sale: $200,000 (Hunter for Macy's and Silvia for Saks)
- Out: Amber

=== Episode 7: Night Out on the Town ===
Original Airdate: April 19, 2013

The remaining designers must work together in pairs to direct their own photo shoot for a Fiat advertisement that showcases their latest piece; the participants must interpret what a 'big night on town' means and create a garment accordingly. Both people on the winning team will each receive a Fiat car.

Buyers	Contestants					
Buyers	Team Nicole		Team John		Team Jessica	
Buyers	Johana	Daniel	Silvia	Cassandra	Hunter	Garrett; JesseRay
Macy's	$50,000	No offer	No offer	No offer	$60,000	$60,000
Saks Fifth Avenue	No offer	$155,000	$70,000	No offer	No offer	No offer
Express	No offer	$175,000	$175,000	No offer	No offer	$65,000

- Top sale: $175,000 (Daniel for Express and Silvia for Express)
- Out: Johana
- Winner of Photo Challenge: Johana & Daniel

=== Episode 8: His and Hers ===
Original Airdate: April 26, 2013

The remaining designers are tasked with creating two unisex outfits that would work well on both male and female buyers that boast current fashion trends; after several end up in tears during a rough week, the sixth participant is sent home.

Buyers	Contestants									
Buyers	Team Nicole		Team John				Team Jessica			
Buyers	Daniel (His)	Daniel (Hers)	Silvia (His)	Silvia (Hers)	Cassandra (His)	Cassandra (Hers)	Hunter (His)	Hunter (Hers)	Garrett; JesseRay (His)	Garrett; JesseRay (Hers)
Macy's	No offer	No offer	No offer	No offer	No offer	$50,000	No offer	No offer	No offer	$200,000
Saks Fifth Avenue	No offer	No offer	No offer	$100,000	No offer	No offer	No offer	No offer	No offer	$200,000
Express	$75,000	$125,000	No offer	No offer	$60,000	No offer	No offer	No offer	No offer	$160,000

- Top sale: $200,000 (Garrett & JesseRay for Macy's)
- Out: Silvia

=== Episode 9: Trending Now-and-Then ===
Original Airdate: May 3, 2013

The final four designers are challenged with updating an old fashion trend reminiscent of years ago for the current spring/summer season, after which they get the chance to specifically choose a decade and create two new pieces for modern times.

Buyers	Contestants							
Buyers	Team Nicole		Team John		Team Jessica			
Buyers	Daniel	Daniel	Cassandra	Cassandra	Hunter	Hunter	Garrett; JesseRay	Garrett; JesseRay
Macy's	No offer	No offer	$50,000	No offer	$60,000	No offer	No offer	$70,000
Saks Fifth Avenue	$50,000	$75,000	No offer	No offer	$200,000	$200,000	$55,000	No offer
Express	No offer	No offer	No offer	$50,000	$50,000	$200,000	No offer	No offer

- Top sale: $200,000 (Hunter for Saks and Hunter for Express)
- Out: Garrett & JesseRay

=== Episode 10: Finale ===
Original Airdate: May 10, 2013 The remaining three contestants are tasked with creating separate showcases consisting of three garments for each of the retailers. The designer that can meet the needs of Macy's, Express and Saks Fifth Avenue will be named America's new "Fashion Star" and receive a capsule collection in each of the stores.

- Winner: Hunter Bell
- Runners-up: Cassandra Hobbins and Daniel Silverstein

== Ratings ==
#	Episode	Air Date	18-49 (Rating/Share)	Viewers (million)
1	"Showstoppers"	March 8, 2013	0.8/3	3.03
2	"Sex Sells"	March 15, 2013	0.8/3	2.96
3	"Something for Everyone"	March 22, 2013	0.7/2	2.89
4	"It's Getting Hot in Here"	March 29, 2013	0.7/3	2.84
5	"It Takes Two"	April 5, 2013	0.6/2	2.61
6	"Buyer's Choice"	April 12, 2013	0.8/3	2.95
7	"Night Out on The Town"	April 19, 2013	2.6/3	10.47
8	"His and Hers"	April 26, 2013	0.7/2	2.92
9	"Trending Now-and-Then"	May 3, 2013	0.7/3	2.76
10	"Finale"	May 10, 2013	0.5/2	2.42
