= Iraqi Canadians =

Total population
- 84,130 (by birth), 59,300 (by ancestry, 2021 Census)

Regions with significant populations
- Toronto, Vancouver, Ottawa, Calgary, Montreal

Languages
- Mesopotamian Arabic, Canadian English, and Canadian French also Kurdish (Sorani, Feyli and Kurmanji dialects), Turkish (Iraqi Turkmen/Turkoman dialects), and Neo-Aramaic (Assyrian and Mandaic)

Religion
- Majority Islam (Shia and Sunni) and Christianity (Syriac Christianity and Catholic) minority Irreligion, Judaism and other

Related ethnic groups
- Arabs, Arab Canadians, Iraqis, Iraqi diaspora

Iraqi Canadians are Canadians of full or partial Iraqi descent, as well as people from the state of Iraq who are ethno-linguistic and religious minorities. According to the 2011 Census there were 49,680 Canadians of Iraqi ancestry, an increase compared to the 2006 Census.

== History ==
Emigration from Iraq to Canada has increased dramatically due to political and economic situations in Iraq. The Iraq-Iran War resulted in many immigrants. With the destroyed Iraqi economy and the oppression of the 13-year economic sanctions against Iraq that followed the Gulf War of 1990–91, there was all the more reason to emigrate. From 1945 until 1975, fewer than 200 Iraqis arrived in Canada. Emigration substantially increased in 1979, the year Saddam Hussein became president of Iraq. Between 1975 and 1992, 6,472 Iraqis arrived in Canada, establishing about 3.5 percent of all Arab immigrants in Canada. About 65 percent of Iraqis settled in the province of Quebec, particularly in Montreal, and in the province of British Columbia, particularly in Vancouver on shores of the Pacific Ocean. Many Iraqis also live in the province of Ontario, particularly in the Canadian capital city of Ottawa, Windsor and Toronto, the most populated city in Canada.

The 1991 Canadian census recorded 4,790 Iraqis; 3,525 of wholly Iraqi ancestry, and 1,265 of partial Iraqi ancestry. Iraqi immigrants through the period of 1981-1992 settled principally in a few cities in Canada: British Columbia (362), Alberta (268), Quebec (203), Ontario (176), and Manitoba (152).

== Demography ==
=== Religion ===
Iraqi Canadian demography by religion
Religious group	2021 (Note: Religious breakdown proportions based on "Iraqi", "Assyrian", and "Chaldean" ethnic or cultural origin response on the 2021 census.)		2001 (Note: Religious breakdown proportions based on "Iraqi" ethnic or cultural origin response on the 2001 census.)	
Religious group	Pop.	%	Pop.	%
Christianity	54,990	60.36%	10,070	52.33%
Islam	27,590	30.29%	7,750	40.27%
Irreligion	5,455	5.99%	600	3.12%
Judaism	2,110	2.32%	710	3.69%
Buddhism	40	0.04%	—N/a	—N/a
Hinduism	20	0.02%	—N/a	—N/a
Other	865	0.95%	115	0.6%
Total Iraqi Canadian population	91,100	100%	19,245	100%

Iraqi Canadian demography by Christian sects
Religious group	2021		2001	
Religious group	Pop.	%	Pop.	%
Catholic	28,705	52.2%	7,175	71.25%
Orthodox	6,280	11.42%	1,025	10.18%
Protestant	980	1.78%	415	4.12%
Other Christian	19,025	34.6%	1,455	14.45%
Total iraqi Canadian christian population	54,990	100%	10,070	100%

== Geographical distribution ==
Provinces and territories	(2011)
Ontario	35,220
British Columbia	3,145
Alberta	4,465
Manitoba	615
Saskatchewan	810
Quebec	411

== Employment ==
The main causes for the immigration of Iraqis were due to the Gulf War and the situation in Iraq which drove them out of their homeland.

In Canada, Iraqi immigrants seem to face three unexplainable problems, the first being unable to find jobs where they can apply their professional expertise. The second is discrimination, with a possibility that some employers associate them with the regime that they fled. The third is their lack of Canadian experience. Despite a high level of education and professional experience, 54 percent of 892 immigrants were unemployed. Of the 407 with jobs, 40 percent had professional positions; 24 percent, lower white-collar; 30 percent, blue-collar; 3 percent, service; and 3 percent, not stated.

== Community life ==
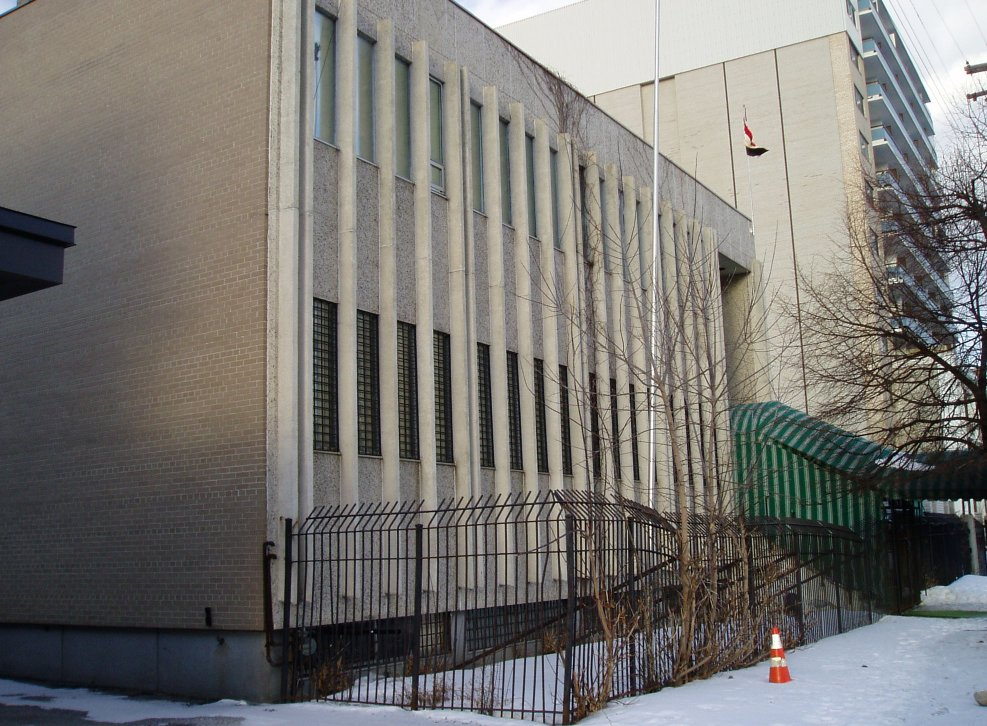
Iraqi Embassy in Ottawa

The patterns of formal association among Iraqis are new and voluntary, as revealed most notably in the Iraqi Community Center based in Cote Des Neiges, Montreal. The center helps Iraqis adapt to Canada and develop ties with general society, and disseminates information about the ethnocultural heritage of Iraqi Canadians. Gender equity is the norm; the president of the Iraqi Canadian Society is a woman.

== Culture ==
Despite differences in dialect, many Iraqi Canadians see themselves as Arabs, Mandaeans, Assyrians or Chaldeans. Almost all Iraqi Arab immigrants wish to maintain the Arabic language in both oral and written forms. Because young children and Canadian-born ones cannot easily learn reading and writing skills, more emphasis is put on teaching oral skills. Many Canadian-born can understand spoken Arabic without being able to speak it.

Gender equity, which has expanded in Iraq itself, is encouraged in Canada. Marriage for both males and females remains principally endogamous.

There are a sizable number of Iraqi Christians in Canada. Christian denominations include Assyrian Church of the East, Chaldean Catholic Church, and Syriac Orthodox Church. The remaining 40 percent are Muslims, the majority being Shiite. There are also small numbers of Mandaeans and Jews, numbering in the hundreds or thousands.

== Notable Iraqi Canadians ==
- Nhoopeh al-Areebi, professional wrestler (half Iraqi)
- Fajer Al-Kaisi, Iraqi-born Canadian actor and comedian from Montreal
- Joe Balass, filmmaker
- Farouk Kaspaules, Iraqi-born Canadian artist
- Naïm Kattan, author, novelist and critic
- Anisa Mehdi, Emmy Award-winning film director, journalist and director of Inside Mecca
- Duraid Munajim, filmmaker and freelance cinematographer
- Leilah Nadir, writer
- Narcy, rapper
- Farah Nosh, photojournalist
- Muayyed Nureddin, geologist
- Awatef Rasheed, women's rights activist, Femmy Award winner in Canada
- Anita Sarkeesian, feminist media critic and public speaker. Her parents are Armenians from Iraq who emigrated to Canada in the 1970s
- Isho Shiba, Iraqi-Assyrian born in Iraq, and a five-time Canadian national boxing champion
- Isa Hasan al-Yasiri, poet
- Bahaa Abdul Hadi, founder of Qi Card

== See also ==
- Canada–Iraq relations
- Arab Canadians
- Assyrians in Canada
- Iraqi Americans
- Kurdish Canadians
- Middle Eastern Canadians
- West Asian Canadians
