= Mimi Macpherson =

Australian environmentalist and entrepreneur

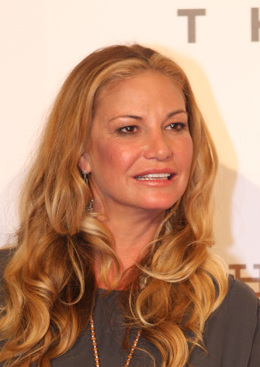
- Macpherson, in 2011
- Born: Miriam Frances Gow; 18 May 1967 (age 59)
- Occupation: Founder of Mimi Macpherson Whale Watch Expeditions
- Years active: 1988–present
- Relatives: Elle Macpherson (sister)
- Website: mimimacpherson.com.au

Mimi Macpherson (born Miriam Frances Gow, 18 May 1967) is an Australian environmentalist, entrepreneur and celebrity.

She joined a whale-watching boat crew at age 21 and eventually began her own whale-watching business, winning multiple awards before going into property development and promotions. She has also acted as a corporate and NGO spokeswoman, and a media personality.

== Early life ==
Macpherson is the daughter of Frances and Peter Gow, and the younger sister of Elle Macpherson. Her parents divorced when she was young, and both girls adopted the surname of their stepfather, Neill Macpherson. She also has a brother, Brendon, and another sister, Elizabeth.

The family lived around Lindfield and Killara, where Mimi attended high school. Mimi joined the crew of her father's whale watching boat at age 21 before going into business for herself.

== Career ==
Macpherson owned her own whale-watching company, Mimi Macpherson Whale Watch Expeditions, in Hervey Bay, Queensland. Her boat, Discovery One, was the largest whale-watch boat in an area considered the "whale watch capital of Australia." She also sold bottled water and served as a motivational speaker. She won the 1996 Queensland Tourism Award, as well as two Fraser Coast tourism awards. In 2001 she sold her two-boat business to become the director of three property companies and a promotions firm. She was named the National Businesswoman of the Year by the Women's Network of Australia in 1997 and was featured on the cover of Cosmopolitan magazine as "one of the 30 most successful Australian businesswomen under the age of 30". In 2006 Macpherson went back to the whale-watching business, working as host in a luxury catamaran for Whale Watching Gold Coast. In December 2008 Macpherson declared herself bankrupt, due to several accumulated debts and loans where she gave her personal guarantee.

Macpherson appeared in a 1999 advertising campaign for Foster's Lager. In 2008, she became the "face" of Evolve Makeup, a cosmetics company, and was previously the face of US-based talent agency ProScout, for whom she led an Australian talent search. She also appeared on the cover of the first Australian edition of FHM magazine.

In February 2009 Macpherson became a radio presenter on a Sunshine Coast, Queensland radio station called Zinc96. She has also reported on "environmental issues" for the Discovery Channel. She served as a DJ during Mercedes-Benz Fashion Week Australia 2012.

== Environmentalism ==
Macpherson has previously been the spokesperson for environmental organizations Coastcare, Planet Ark, Clean Up Australia and Sydney Water. She has raised more than $100,000 for the Pacific Whale Foundation. She currently works with the World Wildlife Fund and the Born Wild program.

In 2000, Macpherson served as a lobbyist for animal welfare group Humane Society International at a meeting of the International Whaling Commission. She supported a campaign to disrupt whaling by Japanese ships. She also wrote the foreword for Jack Pollard's guide to whale watching in Australia.

As of 2011, Macpherson was studying naturopathy with the intention of creating a line of environmentally friendly skincare products.

== Personal life ==
Macpherson and her parents appeared on the ABC Television series Australian Story in 1998. In 2007, she was a celebrity contestant on the reality singing competition It Takes Two; she was paired with David Hobson and came third.

On 19 March 2007, Macpherson was convicted of driving under the influence with a blood alcohol level nearly three times over the legal driving limit, her third conviction since 1995.
