= Leilah Nadir =

Canadian novelist and writer

Leilah Nadir is a Canadian novelist and writer.

== Biography ==
She was born to an Iraqi father and an English mother, and she was raised in Britain and Canada. Nadir holds a master's degree in English Literature from the University of Edinburgh, and also a Joint Honours bachelor's degree in English and History from McGill University.

Nadir has previously worked in both London and Vancouver in the publishing industry. Since the US-led invasion of Iraq, she has written numerous articles and broadcast political commentaries for CBC, The Globe and Mail, The Georgia Straight, and she has also published a feature article in Brick magazine. In September 2007, she published The Orange Trees of Baghdad: In Search of My Lost Family (Key Porter Books), which details her Iraqi father's story and her Iraqi family's experiences since the 2003 invasion of Iraq. The book includes family photographs as well as contemporary photos by acclaimed Iraqi Canadian photojournalist Farah Nosh; it was widely praised on publication, notably by Naomi Klein and Noam Chomsky. In July 2008, she won the George Ryga award for Social Awareness in Literature. The Orange Trees of Baghdad was published in Canada, Italy, Australia and New Zealand, France, Turkey, the UK Commonwealth and the USA. The book was published in Baghdad, Iraq in Arabic in 2022 by Qarrat Publishers. Nadir currently lives in Vancouver, British Columbia with her husband, son and daughter.

== Bibliography ==
- The Orange Trees of Baghdad: In Search of My Lost Family
