= Hunter Bell (designer) =

American fashion designer

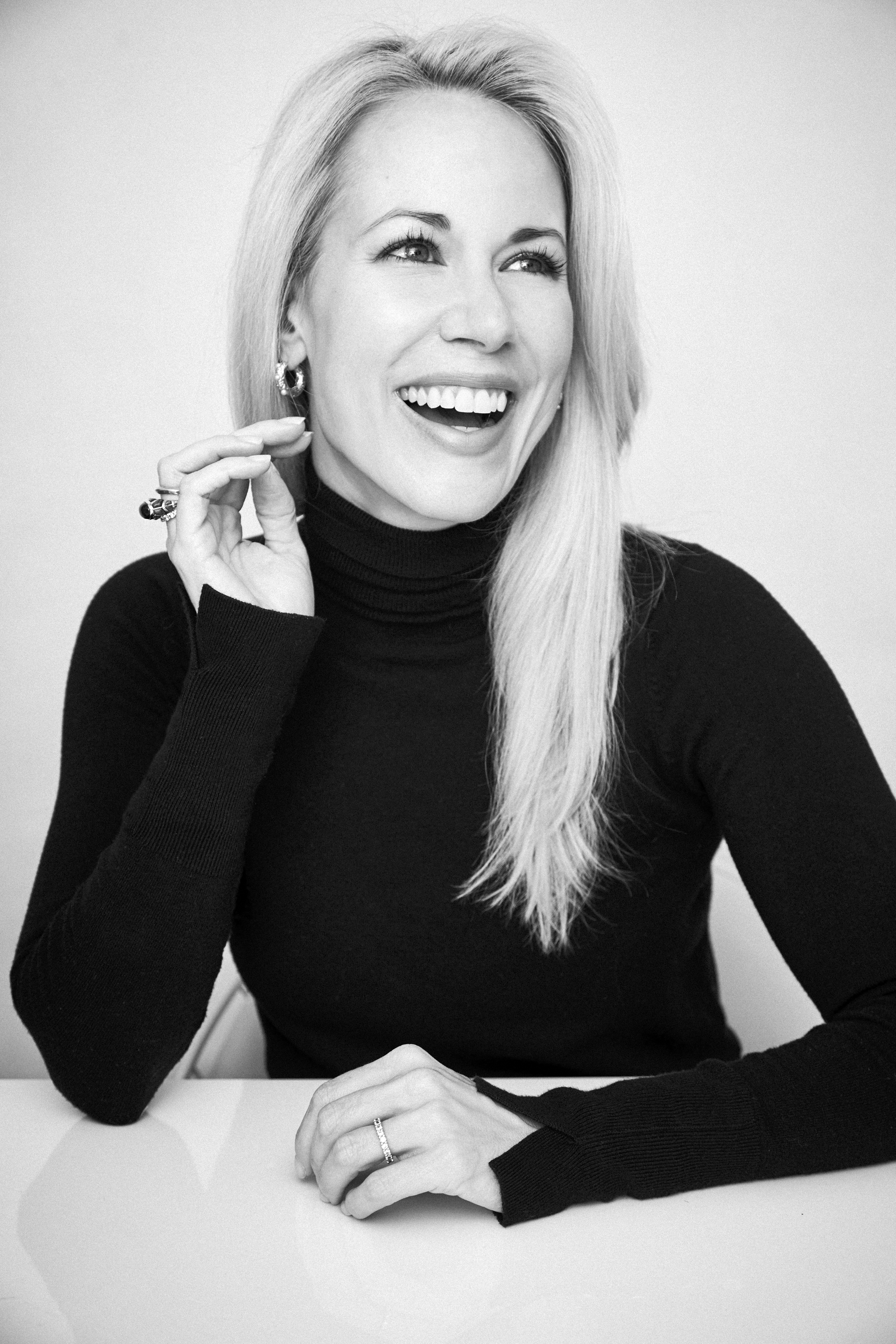
- Hunter Bell in 2023
- Born: 1981 (age 44–45); Florence, South Carolina, U.S.
- Education: University of Alabama; Parsons New School
- Occupation: Fashion designer
- Years active: 2006–present
- Website: hunterbellnyc.com

Hunter Bell is an American fashion designer based in New York City and the owner of Hunter Bell NYC. She was the season two winner of Fashion Star. Bell attended the University of Alabama and graduated in 2003 with a degree in fashion design and studio art.

== Fashion Star ==
During Fashion Star, she had been bought by one of the buyers each week except one, where she and another front runner, Silvia Argüello, were in the bottom two, where Silvia was ultimately eliminated. In the final, Bell went against Cassandra Hobbins, who was deemed the underdog of the season. After each of the contestants presented three capsule collections to buyers from Express, Macy's, and Saks Fifth Avenue, Bell was crowned the winner. Jessica Simpson responded to the win by saying that Bell "deserves it! Everyone wants to wear your stuff, and now they can!"
