= Terron Schaefer =

Brazilian businessman

- Born: Brazil
- Occupation: Former Executive Vice President/Chief Creative Officer at Saks Fifth Avenue

Terron Schaefer was the former acting Executive Vice President and Chief Creative Officer for Saks Fifth Avenue. Before becoming a part of the Saks team, he was the Senior Vice President of marketing for Warner Bros. Worldwide. Schaefer is no longer a buyer representing Saks Fifth Avenue on NBC's Fashion Star, seasons 1 and 2.
He died on October 26, 2024.
