= Fashion Star =

Television series

- Genre: Talent show
- Created by: Rick Ringbakk, E.J. Johnston and Jim Deutch
- Directed by: Alan Carter
- Presented by: Louise Roe (2013); Elle Macpherson (2012)
- Judges: Jessica Simpson; Nicole Richie; John Varvatos
- Country of origin: United States
- Original language: English
- No. of seasons: 2
- No. of episodes: 26

Production
- Executive producers: Ben Silverman; Jane Lipsitz; Dan Cutforth; Casey Kriley; Rick Ringbakk; E.J Johnston; James Deutch; Elle Macpherson
- Running time: 43 minutes, 65-minute premiere
- Production companies: Electus; 5x5 Media; Magical Elves; EJD Productions; Global Fashion Association

Original release
- Network: NBC
- Release: March 13, 2012 – May 10, 2013

Fashion Star is an American reality television series on NBC, created and executive produced by E.J. Johnston, James Deutch and Rick Ringbakk which focuses on fashion design and is hosted by Louise Roe. It was hosted by Elle Macpherson in the first season. The contestants compete with each other to create the best clothes and are restricted in time, materials and theme. Their designs are judged, and one or more designers are eliminated each week.

On May 11, 2012, NBC renewed Fashion Star for a second season. Season 2 premiered Friday, March 7, 2013. On July 27, 2013, NBC canceled Fashion Star after two seasons.

== Format ==
Fashion Star features unknown designers competing for a chance to have their creations bought. Each week, the contestants work with mentors Jessica Simpson, Nicole Richie, and John Varvatos in designing their creations, shopping for materials and overseeing production. They then compete in a fashion show during which they display their work to the three buyers: Caprice Willard of Macy's, Terron E. Schaefer of Saks Fifth Avenue and Nicole M. Christie of H&M in season 1, and Erika DeSalvatore for Express in season 2. Any designer whose clothes are not purchased that week is up for elimination from the show. The mentors, who also serve as judges, save one unsold contestant each week. Then the three buyers choose which of the remaining unsold designers is sent home. At the end of the season, the three remaining contestants must create separate showcases of three garments for each retailer. Whoever meets the needs of the three retailers will be named "Fashion Star" and will receive a capsule collection worth $6 million within each store.

In season 2, there were several changes from the original format. Compared to the first season where the mentors coached all the designers, the mentors Jessica Simpson, Nicole Richie, and John Varvatos focused on 4 designers each. Another change was Elle Macpherson leaving her hosting duties, though still serving as one of the show's executive producers. She was replaced by Louise Roe. Also, H&M was replaced by Express as one of the buyers, represented by Erika DeSalvatore. The prize was also reduced from $6,000,000 to $3,000,000. The mentors would choose two designers to face elimination with the buyers voting to eliminate one designer.

== Seasons ==
| Season | Premiere date | Finale date | No. of designers | Winner | Runners-up | | Buyers |
|---|---|---|---|---|---|---|---|
| 1 | March 13, 2012 | May 15, 2012 | 14 | Kara Laricks | Ronnie Escalante | Nzimiro Oputa | Macy's; Saks Fifth Avenue; H&M |
| 2 | March 8, 2013 | May 10, 2013 | 12 | Hunter Bell | Cassandra Hobbins | Daniel Silverstein | Macy's; Saks Fifth Avenue; Express |

=== Season 1 ===
Fashion Star premiered its first season on March 13, 2012, and concluded on May 15, 2012. Fashion Star won Best Branded Format at the FRAPA Format Awards at MIPCOM. It was also nominated for a precedent-setting three awards at the annual convention including Best Competition Reality Format, Best Brand-Driven Format and Best Multi-Platform Format. It also took home Best Social Commerce or Marketing Program at the 2012 Social TV Awards.

The winner of the first season of Fashion Star was Kara Laricks, with Ronnie Escalante and Nzimiro Oputa finishing as runners-up. Larricks took home $6 million contracts with Macy's, Saks Fifth Avenue, and H&M. The cast members were Nicholas Bowes, Oscar Fierro, Lizzie Parker, Lisa Vian Hunter, Edmond Newton, Barbara Bates, Sarah Parrott, Ross Bennett, Nikki Poulos, Luciana Scarabello, Orly Shani, Nzimiro Oputa, Ronnie Escalante, and Kara Laricks.

=== Season 2 ===
Fashion Star premiered its second and final season on March 8, 2013, and concluded on May 10, 2013.

The winner of the second and final season of Fashion Star was Hunter Bell, with Cassandra Hobbins and Daniel Silverstein finishing as runners-up. Bell took home a $3 million contract with Macy's, Saks Fifth Avenue, and Express. The cast members were Bret Young, Tori Nichel, David Appel, Priscilla Barroso, Brandon Scott, Amber Perley, Johana Hernandez, Silvia Argüello, Garret Gerson and JesseRay Vasquez, Daniel Silverstein, Cassandra Hobbins, and Hunter Bell.

== International versions ==
Network Ten in Australia bought the rights to air the series in Australia and has also discussed creating an Australian version of the series.

ProSieben in Germany has aired a German version called Fashion Hero in autumn 2013 with Claudia Schiffer as the host. Fashion Hero did not reach the audience successfully, it was shortened and finally abandoned.

Dubai One and Awaan have aired an Arabic version called Fashion Star in February 2016 as the host. Fashion Star did not reach the audience successfully, it was shortened and finally abandoned.
