= Farah Nosh =

Iraqi Canadian photojournalist

- Born: Canada
- Occupation: Photojournalist

Farah Nosh (Arabic: فرح نوش) is an Iraqi Canadian photojournalist. Her work about Iraq and its conflicts has been exhibited in galleries in the U.S. and UK. She has appeared on the CNN Inside The Middle East segment "Someone You Should Know", which explores different persons and their effects on the region.

== Life ==
Nosh was born and grew up in Canada. She attended the University of British Columbia in 1998 to study geography for her BA, and then in 2002 she undertook a diploma in photojournalism at the Western Academy of Photography in Victoria.

Nosh was working as a freelance photographer in Iraq, and when the U.S.–Iraq war began in 2003, she left the compound where western journalists were based and lived isolated in a small house in western Baghdad with her family. Therefore, she spent the war without much sense of what was going on outside of the area. Subsequently, she has covered both the Iraqi civilian and American military forces sides.

== Work ==
Nosh intends her work to show war's impact on the human condition. She moved in 2002 to work as a freelance photographer in Iraq at the time Saddam Hussein was still in power, along with a few other western journalists, in which she appeared in Life, The New York Times, The Guardian, The Independent, The Times, Marie Claire, The Globe and Mail, The National Post, and The Toronto Star. Since the Iraq war started in 2003, she has been paying frequent visits to Iraq working with the U.S. military and Iraqi citizens. In 2005, Nosh undertook a large-format photography project in Canada and Alaska, documenting the remaining fluent speakers of the Haida language. In 2011, that project culminated with an exhibition and book launch that took place at the Haida Gwaii Museum.

In 2006, because of the steep decline of security in Iraq, there was a lack of support for her projects within Baghdad. She then created a body of work, covertly traveling around Baghdad to record the lives of Iraqis affected by the war. This work won her the Overseas Press Club Award for Feature Photography. She also reported on the Iraqi refugee crisis in Damascus. As well as working in Iraq, she has also photographed in Afghanistan, Israel, Palestine, Pakistan, Syria, Lebanon, and Egypt.

Her picture of an Iraqi boy made the cover of Time magazine.

== Exhibitions ==
- Witness: Casualties of War, 2008, Stephen Cohen Gallery, Los Angeles, CA
- War and Medicine, 2008/9, Wellcome Collection, London
- Blow Out, 2009, The Empty Quarter Fine Art Photography Gallery, DIFC, Dubai
- That Which Makes Us Haida – The Haida Language, 2011, Haida Gwaii Museum, Haida Heritage Centre, Haida Gwaii
- Stanley Park After the Storm of 2006, 2011/12, Teck Gallery, SFU, Vancouver
- That Which Makes Us Haida – The Haida Language, 2012, Bill Reid Gallery, Vancouver

== Awards ==
- 2005: "PDN's 30 2005: Our Choice of Emerging Photographers to Watch", Photo District News
- 2006: National Geographic Magazine Development Grant
- 2007: Nominated for ICP Infinity Award for Photojournalism
- 2007: Photo District News Nikon Storyteller Award
- 2007: National Press Photographers Association – 1st Place Single Portrait, Time magazine
- 2007: National Press Photographers Association – 1st Place Serial Portrait, The New York Times
- 2007: Pictures of the Year International – 1st Place Magazine Portrait, Time magazine
- 2007: Pictures of the Year International – 2nd Place Magazine Photographer of the Year
- 2007: Overseas Press Club of America – 1st Place Feature Photography, Time magazine

== See also ==
- Iraqi art
- List of Iraqi artists
