= Kara Laricks =

American fashion designer (born 1973)

- Born: 1973 (age 52–53)
- Occupation: Fashion designer
- Years active: 2012–present
- Website: http://www.karalaricks.com/

Kara Laricks is an American fashion designer. Laricks was the season one winner of Fashion Star.

== Personal life ==
Kara Laricks was a fourth grade elementary school teacher for ten years before she quit to become a fashion designer. She loved design as a child and chose to become a teacher because it was a "safe career." Laricks lives and works in New York, New York. Laricks attended the Academy of Art University and graduated in 2008. Laricks is a lesbian who hid her orientation whilst a schoolteacher but remained out personally. She came out publicly on national television during the first season of Fashion Star. She stated she was nervous about coming out on television.

== Professional life ==
=== Design aesthetic ===
Laricks' design aesthetic is very contemporary with men's fashion influences. Laricks cites designer Yohji Yamamoto as her "design idol." She finds influence in Yamamoto's "minimalistic color palette and the avant garde cut of his designs." Her other favorite designers are Yves Saint Laurent and Jil Sander. She also cites actor Tilda Swinton as a style hero. Laricks has described her design aesthetic as "modern-day Annie Hall meets a Japanese street style."

==== Fashion Star ====
As a designer, Laricks has been described as having a "unique perspective," by H&M fashion buyer Nicole Christie. Her first round of designs during the first episode of Fashion Star featured her signature men's tie, which was made from the collars of men's dress shirts. Laricks designed only ties and was almost eliminated from the show. Saks Fifth Avenue fashion buyer Terron Schaefer questioned whether she was a "one trick pony," which was challenged after the second episode and Larick designed a drape-tie dress which resulted in a bidding war between the programs buyers.

In the final episode of Fashion Star, Laricks introduced a pair of drop crotch pants, similar to harem pants, which Rolling Stone described as "a bit too contemporary." Designer John Varvatos called them "too crotchety." After presenting three capsule collections to buyers from H&M, Macy's and Saks Fifth Avenue, Jessica Simpson responded that Laricks challenged "every woman to step outside the box." This outsider design style lends Laricks to being considered a specialty designer. Laricks won the first season of the reality-contest program. Rolling Stone credited the show with embracing an "unconventionial" designer and applauded the buyers, especially Macy's, for thinking outside the box and awarding Laricks. Laricks was awarded a grand prize of $6 million of purchases by Macy's, H&M and Saks Fifth Avenue.

Boston Globe fashion critic Rachel Raczka calls Laricks' geometric prints "awkward," while contrasting Laricks' day-to-night workwear as "luxurious."
