= Elle Macpherson =

Australian model and actress (born 1964)

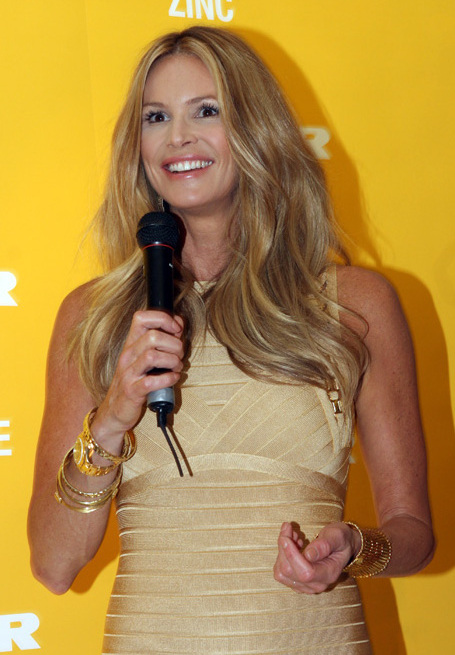
- Macpherson in Sydney in 2011
- Born: Eleanor Nancy Gow; 29 March 1964 (age 62); Killara, New South Wales, Australia
- Spouse(s): Gilles Bensimon (m. 1986; div. 1989) Jeffrey Soffer (m. 2013; sep. 2017)
- Partner(s): Arpad Busson (1996–2005); Andrew Wakefield (2017–2019)
- Children: 2
- Relatives: Mimi Macpherson (sister)
- Modelling information
- Height: 182 cm (5 ft 11 1/2 in)
- Hair colour: Light brown
- Eye colour: Brown
- Agency: d'management group (Milan); Kruger Cowne (London, Los Angeles, Nice, Hong Kong)

Eleanor Nancy Macpherson (/məkˈfɜːrsən/ mək-FUR-sən; née Gow; born 29 March 1964) is an Australian model, businesswoman, television host, and actress.

She is known for her record five cover appearances for the Sports Illustrated Swimsuit Issue beginning in the 1980s, leading to her nickname "The Body", coined by Time in 1989. She is the founder, primary model, and creative director for a series of business ventures, including Elle Macpherson Intimates, a lingerie line, and The Body, a line of skin care products. She was the host and executive producer of Britain & Ireland's Next Top Model from 2010 to 2013. She is an executive producer of NBC's Fashion Star and was the host for the first season.

As an actress, Macpherson appeared in supporting roles in Sirens (1994), The Mirror Has Two Faces (1996) and as Julie Madison in Batman and Robin (1997) as well as lead roles in The Edge (1997) and South Kensington (2001). She had a recurring role on Friends and hosted an episode of Saturday Night Live.

== Early life ==
Macpherson was born Eleanor Nancy Gow in Killara, New South Wales, on 29 March 1964, the daughter of entrepreneur and sound engineer Peter Gow, a former president of the Cronulla-Sutherland Sharks, a Sydney rugby league team, and Frances Gow, a nurse. She is of Scottish descent. Macpherson's parents divorced when she was 10 years old, and she moved with her mother and two siblings. Her mother later remarried, and a clerical mistake in registering at her new school meant that her surname was changed from Gow to Macpherson, her stepfather's surname.

Macpherson grew up in East Lindfield, a suburb in Sydney's North Shore, and attended Killara High School, completing her Higher School Certificate in 1981. Her sister is businesswoman and environmentalist Mimi Macpherson, born Miriam Frances Gow.

== Career ==
=== Rise to fame as model ===
Macpherson enrolled to study law at the University of Sydney. Before beginning her university studies, she travelled to the United States to spend a year doing modelling work to earn money to pay for her law books. She travelled to New York City, where she initially signed up with Click Model Management. Her modelling career began in 1982 with a television commercial for Tab, a remake of an American one that featured Lisa Parker, which established her as a "girl next door" figure in Australia.

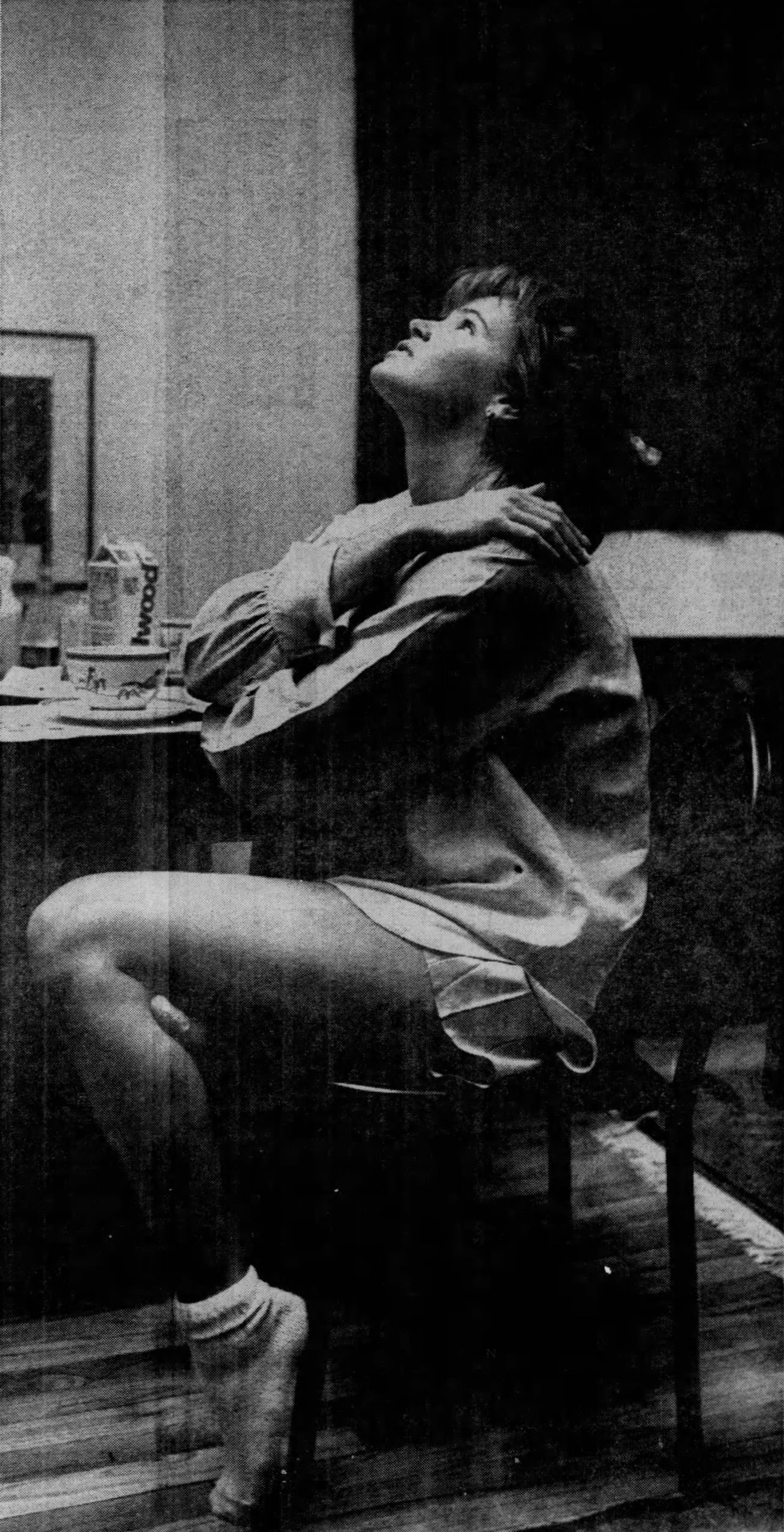
Macpherson in 1987

During the 1980s, Macpherson's profile quickly rose, and she appeared on the cover and in the pages of major magazines including Elle, Harper's Bazaar, Marie Claire, Vogue, Cosmopolitan, Tatler, GQ, Allure, Mademoiselle, Glamour, Time, L'Officiel, Flare, Maxim, and New York. She cemented her high-profile image through frequent appearances in Elle; she was featured on numerous covers and appeared in every issue for six straight years. During that time, at the age of 21, she married Gilles Bensimon, the creative director of Elle. In 1985, Macpherson became the longtime face of luxury French skincare company Biotherm.

Eventually she garnered more exposure through Sports Illustrated magazine's annual Swimsuit Issue. She appeared on the cover a record five times: 1986, 1987, 1988, 1994, and 2006.

She has walked the runways for Louis Vuitton, Ralph Lauren, Azzedine Alaïa, Donna Karan, Christian Dior, Thierry Mugler, Nicole Miller, Michael Kors, Perry Ellis, Kenzo, Todd Oldham, Calvin Klein, John Galliano, and Valentino.

After appearing nude in the 1994 film Sirens, Macpherson learned that the media had begun searching for nude photos of her, including contacting her ex-boyfriends. To address this, Macpherson appeared in a nude pictorial in the May 1994 issue of Playboy magazine, shot by Herb Ritts, to produce nude photos "on her own terms". In 1999, the twin island nation of Antigua and Barbuda honoured Macpherson by using her face on a series of postage stamps, the first model to appear on legal tender. Macpherson appeared among other Australian icons during the 2000 Summer Olympics closing ceremony, her elaborate float resembling a camera lens and featuring a runway. Along with Naomi Campbell, she co-hosted the Miss Universe 2001 pageant. Her popularity had reached such a level that the Australian government offered her a position on its tourist commission as an unofficial ambassador.

During her career, Macpherson has worked with fashion photographers including Francesco Scavullo, Mario Testino, Mert and Marcus, Ellen von Unwerth, and Steven Meisel. Portraits of Macpherson, shot by Bob Carlos Clarke, were among those donated to the National Portrait Gallery by his family following his death. Macpherson received the Style Icon award at the 2006 Elle Style Awards presented by fashion magazine Elle. In March 2008, she signed a three-year deal with Revlon Cosmetics, which named her a global brand ambassador. She has since been featured in print and advertising campaigns for the company. She returned to the runway in 2010 to close the fall Louis Vuitton show for Marc Jacobs in Paris.

=== Business career ===
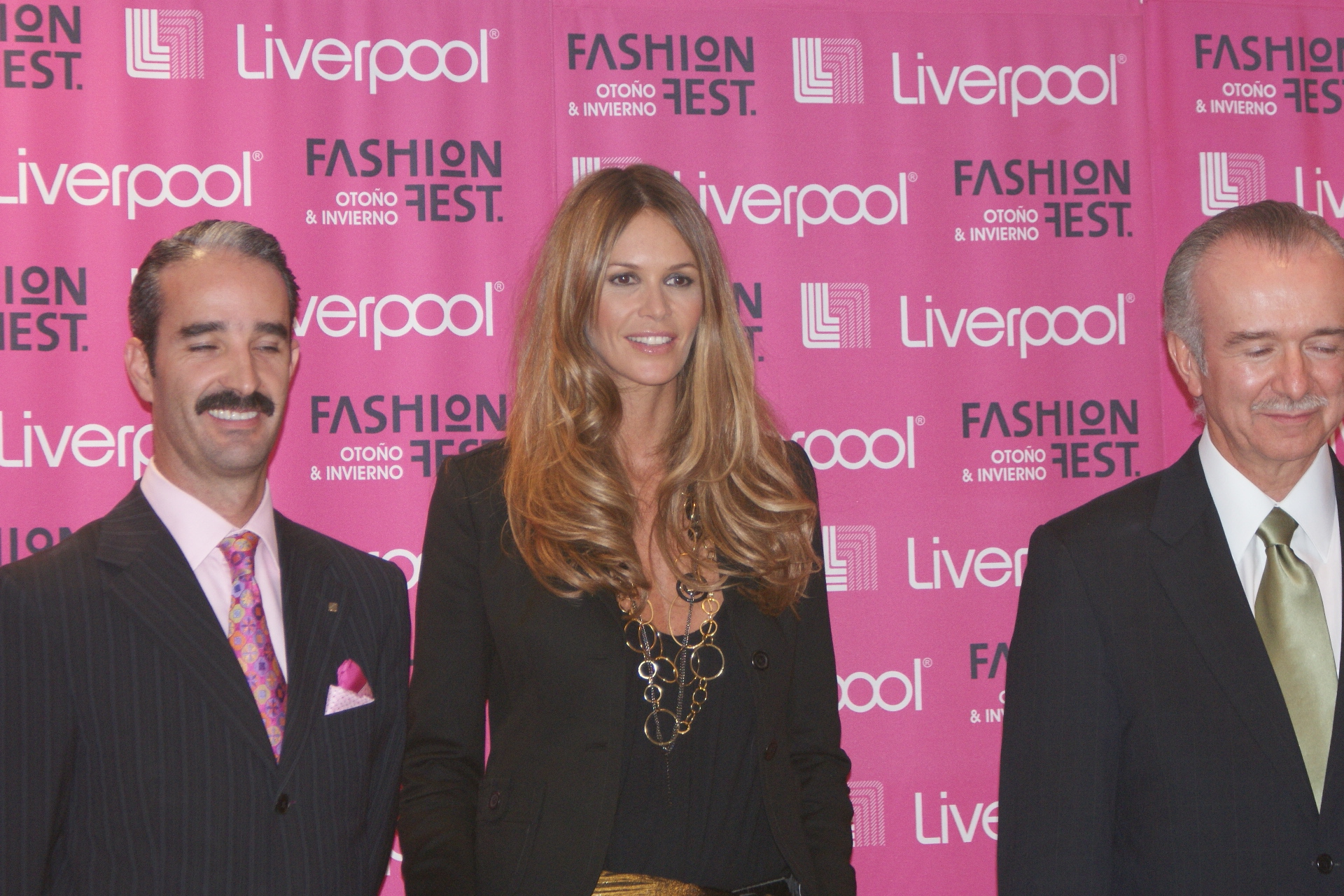
Macpherson in September 2008 at Fashion Fest

In the 1980s, together with Linda Evangelista, Christy Turlington, Tatjana Patitz, Naomi Campbell, Pavlína Pořízková, and Cindy Crawford, Macpherson became part of the new generation of supermodels. Time magazine bestowed the nickname Elle "The Body" Macpherson upon her in 1989 after she graced their cover. She went on to use the name in a number of business ventures. In 1996, Frank DeCaro of The New York Times cited Macpherson, along with Linda Evangelista, Christy Turlington, Cindy Crawford, Naomi Campbell, Helena Christensen, and Claudia Schiffer as "The Magnificent Seven". DeCaro reflected, "Known by their first names to legions of fans, they are the legends of the modern catwalk, the girl next door pretty underneath all the paint."

In 1994, she left her agency, Ford Models, to form her own company, Elle Macpherson Inc., which would serve as the financial organisational base for her later endeavours. She soon went on to produce her own series of calendars, each of which was accompanied by a "making of" television program in 1992, 1993, and 1994. She used this as a springboard to create the "Your Personal Best – The Body" series of workout videos.

She later diversified her portfolio of businesses and, in 1990, launched her lingerie collection 'Elle Macpherson Intimates' in partnership with Bendon Limited Apparel. Intimates became the single best-selling lingerie line in both Great Britain and Australia.

The partnership was among the first instances of a crossover between a model and a fashion label. In 1989, when she was first approached by Bendon to promote their lingerie in Australia, Macpherson saw an opportunity to reverse their strategy and suggested a licensing arrangement, with products bearing her name and designs created in partnership with Bendon's team. Though commonplace now, the idea was unorthodox at the time.

Macpherson took a significant role in the development and management of the company, serving as chief marketing officer and later creative director. In January 2010, Macpherson expanded the line, launching Obsidian as a sub-brand. While nursing her second child, she spearheaded the development of a signature maternity bra line. Intimates has retained a high brand recognition into the 2000s, appearing as a featured brand on America's Next Top Model; last year, the brand celebrated 10 years of being stocked at Selfridges.

Macpherson has also created her own line of beauty products: "Elle Macpherson—The Body". The line was carried at Boots, and Australian suncare brand Invisible Zinc. She spent a year on the board of directors at Hot Tuna Clothing, advising on product development, brand positioning, and sales strategy.

In 2007, the BBC TV series The Money Programme aired a documentary that followed Macpherson through her day-to-day business as she continued to develop her international lingerie business. In 2009, Macpherson delivered the keynote address at the annual meeting of the International Trademark Association.

In 2014, Macpherson co-founded WelleCo and released its flagship product, an alkalising wellness supplement, The Super Elixir. The product, sold at retailers including Selfridges in London and the premium online retailer Net-A-Porter, has celebrity fans including Kate Moss.

==== Awards ====
Macpherson has received a number of awards recognising her business acumen and the success of Elle Macpherson Intimates. In 2005, she was named Glamour Magazine's Entrepreneur of the Year; in 2007, she received an Everywoman Ambassador Award recognising her success as a businesswoman; in 2008, the Underfashion Club's Femmy Awards crowned her Lingerie Designer of the Year and in 2009, she received a World Career Award from the Women's World Awards.

=== Acting career ===
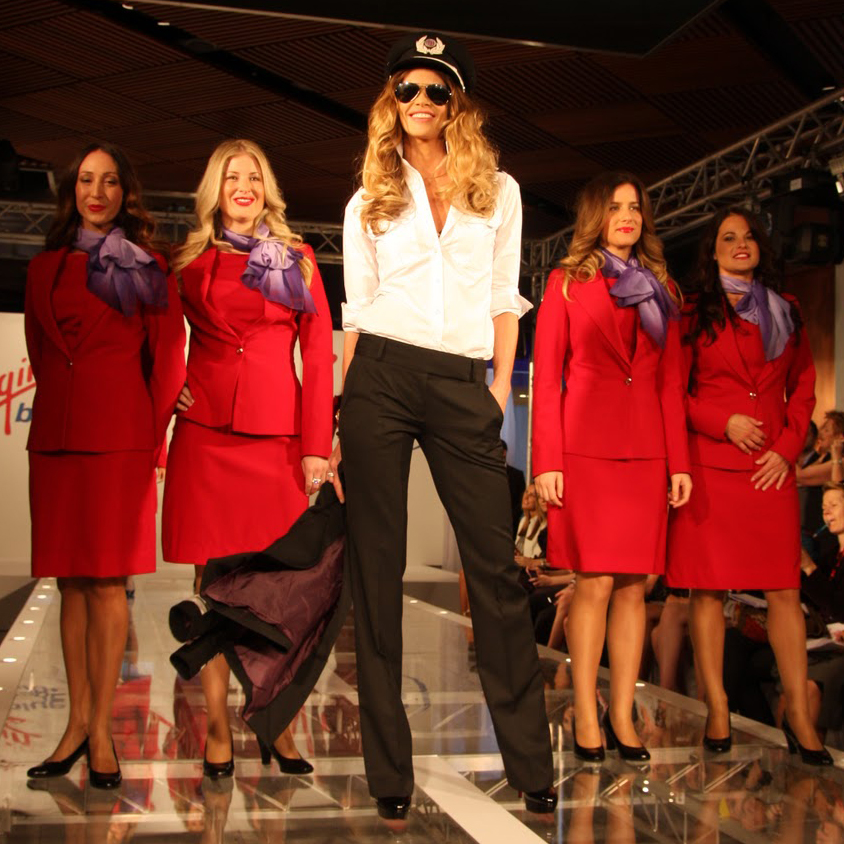
Macpherson (centre) modelling for Virgin Australia in October 2011

Macpherson had her breakout role playing an artist's model in the 1994 film Sirens, which starred Hugh Grant, Sam Neill, and Tara FitzGerald. She also acted in a number of other film roles, appearing in films such as Woody Allen's Alice, Batman & Robin alongside George Clooney, The Edge with Anthony Hopkins, and The Mirror Has Two Faces with Barbra Streisand. In 1996 Macpherson hosted an episode of Saturday Night Live.

In 1999, Macpherson appeared in five episodes of the American TV series Friends as Joey Tribbiani's roommate and eventual girlfriend, Janine Lecroix. Macpherson went on to act in the movie Jane Eyre with William Hurt, and she has also appeared alongside Ben Stiller and Sarah Jessica Parker in If Lucy Fell. her most controversial acting role was in the Showtime cable network miniseries A Girl Thing, as a woman experimenting with bisexuality. In 2001, she appeared in the Italian movie South Kensington. She played agent Claudia Foster in The Beautiful Life, appearing with Mischa Barton, Sara Paxton and Corbin Bleu. The show centred on aspiring models working for a modelling agency and trying to make it big in New York City and in the fashion world. In April 2011, she starred with Gary Lineker in an advertisement for Walkers Crinkles.

=== Hosting career ===
==== Britain and Ireland's Next Top Model ====
In July 2010, Macpherson became the new host of Britain and Ireland's Next Top Model, taking over from Lisa Snowdon. She also serves as executive producer on the show. The revamped show's panellists now include OBE-winning fashion designer Julien Macdonald, designer Whitney Port and male model Tyson Beckford.

==== Fashion Star ====
Macpherson hosts and executive produces NBC's reality competition series, Fashion Star. The series gives 14 unknown designers, mentored by celebrities such as Jessica Simpson, Nicole Richie, and John Varvatos, the chance to launch their collections in three of America's largest clothing retailers, including Macy's, H&M, and Saks Fifth Avenue. Its first season was sold to 75 countries.

=== Extortion attempt ===
According to a police statement reproduced online, between 11 and 22 July 1997 William Ryan Holt and Michael Mischler broke into Macpherson's Los Angeles home while she was away on business in Chicago. They stole an estimated $100,000 worth of jewellery, $6,000 in cash, and several photographs. The two were arrested on 4 August 1997. Mischler, 29, pleaded guilty to one count of attempted extortion and one count of burglary. He received a six-year and eight-month prison sentence. Holt, 26, a former US Air Force enlisted man and a military-justice convict out on parole, pleaded guilty to one count of extortion and was sentenced to a year in prison.

== Personal life ==
Macpherson dated Billy Joel during the early 1980s. Joel has said that the songs "This Night" and "And So It Goes" were written about his relationship with Macpherson. Macpherson is also believed to be at least part of the inspiration for Joel's track "Uptown Girl".

Macpherson met French fashion photographer Gilles Bensimon in 1984 on a photo session for Elle magazine. They wed in May 1986 and divorced three years later.

Macpherson began a relationship with financier Arpad Busson in 1996. They have two sons. The family lived together in London until their separation in July 2005.

Macpherson subsequently began dating Miami, Florida-based hotel heir and billionaire Jeffrey Soffer, son of Donald Soffer, in early 2009. They broke up in March 2012 but reconciled following his injury in a helicopter accident in November 2012. They became engaged in March 2013 and married in July 2013 at the Laucala Resort in Fiji.

In 2017, Macpherson and Soffer announced that they were getting a divorce. That same year, Macpherson underwent treatment for breast cancer, specifically HER2-positive estrogen receptor-positive ductal carcinoma in situ. Her doctors recommended a mastectomy, chemotherapy, hormone therapy, and breast reconstruction surgery, but she decided to have a lumpectomy instead of a mastectomy, followed by holistic medicine instead of chemotherapy.

From 2017 to 2019, Macpherson dated the British fraudster, anti-vaccine activist and disgraced former physician Andrew Wakefield.

=== Philanthropy ===
Macpherson is a European ambassador for Product Red, an initiative set up by Bono and Bobby Shriver to raise money and awareness for the Global Fund to Fight AIDS, Tuberculosis and Malaria and to help eradicate AIDS for women and children in Africa. She is also an ambassador for UNICEF.

In Australia, she is an ambassador for the Smile Foundation, which helps the families of children with rare diseases and organises government research grants. She has also modelled for charitable causes, including fundraising for 2007 British flood victims and child welfare group Absolute Return for Kids.

In 2012, Macpherson led Sky's campaign for International Women's Day.

Macpherson is a patron for the National Association for the Children of Alcoholics (Nacoa UK).

== Filmography ==
=== Film ===
Year	Title	Role	Notes
1990	Alice	Model	
1994	Sirens	Sheela	
1996	If Lucy Fell	Jane Lindquist	
1996	Jane Eyre	Blanche Ingram	
1996	The Mirror Has Two Faces	Candice	
1997	Batman & Robin	Julie Madison	
1997	The Edge	Mickey Morse	
1998	With Friends Like These...	Samantha Mastandrea	
2001	A Girl Thing	Lauren Travis	TV film
2001	South Kensington	Camilla	

=== Television ===
Year	Title	Role	Notes
1996	Saturday Night Live	Herself	"Elle Macpherson/Sting" (season 21: episode 14) "John Goodman/Everclear" (season 21: episode 15)
1999–2000	Friends	Janine LaCroix	"The One Where Phoebe Runs" (season 6: episode 7) "The One with Ross' Teeth" (season 6: episode 8) "The One Where Ross Got High" (season 6: episode 9) "The One with the Routine" (season 6: episode 10) "The One with the Apothecary Table" (season 6: episode 11)
2008	America's Next Top Model	Herself	"Top Model Makeovers" (cycle 10: episode 3)
2009	The Beautiful Life: TBL	Claudia Foster	Main role; series cancelled after 2 episodes
2010–2013	Britain's Next Top Model	Herself	Host; reality TV series
2012–2013	Fashion Star	Herself	Host; reality TV series
2016	Australia's Next Top Model	Herself	Guest Mentor
2026	Mask Singer: Adivina quién canta	Herself/Microphone	Contestant

== See also ==
- Fashion Cafe
