= FashionGlobusUkraine =

National Project of the design art "FashionGlobusUkraine"
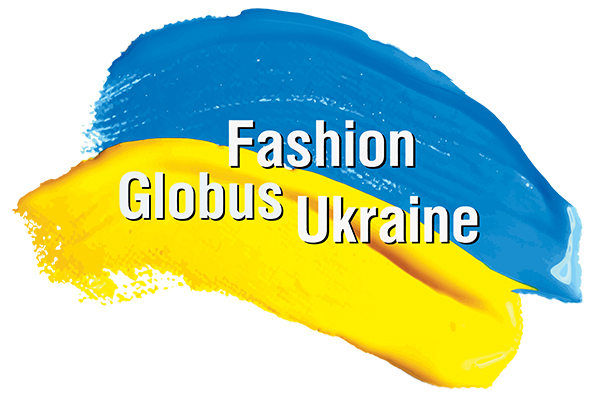
- Founded: October 1, 2014
- Founder: Golda Vynohrads'ka
- Location: Kyiv, Ukraine, TEC "Globus" 3rd line of Independence Square, 1
- Website: www.fashionglobusukraine.com

FashionGlobusUkraine is a socio-cultural organization that unites about 80 designers from all regions of Ukraine with the goal of developing the Ukraine's small art and design industry.

== History ==
Golda Vynohrads'ka, designer and vice president of the Confederation of Designers and Stylists of Ukraine, founded Fashion Globus Ukraine which opened on October 1, 2014.

== Scope of the project ==
Designers from across Ukraine display their works in the center of Kyiv on Independence Square, symbolizing the country's unity. Fashion Globus Ukraine also aims to support national culture through the study of the map of mental features of clothing.

They also hope to boost tourism development in the capital and inspire foreigners to appreciate Ukrainian culture. Their shows include designers from many Ukrainian regions in order to accurately represent all of Ukraine to tourists. Their efforts are inspired by past international cultural exchange projects.

Fashion Globus Ukraine designers hope to demonstrate that Ukraine can produce fashion at an equivalent level to the global fashion industry through the implementation of small industry in Ukraine in cooperation with the Ministry of Education and Science of Ukraine.

== Achievements ==
A collection from 12 regions of Ukraine was shown in February 2015 on New York Fashion Week, which demonstrated the unity of Ukraine's regions, its talent, and peacefulness to the world.

The first diplomatic event with the Embassy of Indonesia in Ukraine was on May 15, 2015 to promote cultural exchanges between the countries.
