= Awatef Rasheed =

Awatef Rasheed (Arabic: عواطف تركي رشيد; born 1956 in Basra, Iraq) is an Iraqi Canadian writer, secular women's rights activist, and the first Iraqi female recipient of Femmy Award. She is a recipient of the Iraqi Women's Initiative Award from the Iraqi Women's Network in 2010. Awatef Rasheed is currently a Regional Adviser for the Urgent Action Fund for Women's Rights in USA. She served as a board member for the Canadian Research Institute for Advancement of Women (CRIAW) from 2009- 2012 and previously served on the steering committee for Feminists for Just and Equitable Public Policy (FemJEPP). She has also been a member of the Canadian Federation of University Women, and a representative for the Iraqi Al-Amal Association.

Awatef Rasheed conducted political and socio-economic research on various global issues throughout her work as a Research Manager for the International Center for Strategic Analysis in Dubai, United Arab Emirates.

Awatef writes and publishes in both Arabic and English. Her blog is in Arabic: Women of Iraq. It is addressed to the Arabic audience and aimed at discussing gender issues and women's lives and rights directly with Iraqis, males and females. She believes that superiority is granted to males over females in Iraq, and other Middle Eastern countries, for virtue of their gender by political, social, religious, and economic powers.

Throughout her entire adult life, Awatef has struggled against the repressive norms of a male-dominated, "Middle Eastern" society under "Saddam Hussein"'s dictatorship and the repercussions of her decision to remove herself from that horrible situation. Since fleeing her country of origin, Iraq and moving to Canada, Awatef has coupled her life experiences with academic study and professional activism to push for greater women's rights in Iraq and around the world. Awatef attended: Acadia University, Mount St. Vincent University and she completed a Master of Arts degree in Women's Studies, Saint Mary's University in 2008. Her thesis for the requirements of the Master's degree is: Iraqi Women: Mechanisms of Overshadowing, Subordination and Inferiorization

Awatef is also affiliated with the International Campaign Against Sharia Court in Canada and with another international organization, based in UK, Women Living Under Muslim Laws

From 2007 to 2010, Awatef Rasheed was a Diplomatic Relations Liaison for the Canadian Council of the Blind - National Office in Ottawa. She accomplished three major projects aiming at serving the blind and people with disabilities all over the world. The first project with embassies was Dining with Ambassadors to Fight Blindness, the second project was "Blind-folded Curling for Embassies" and the third is a fundraising cookbook, in which 105 embassies took part, "Kitchens of the World" In 2007, Awatef Rasheed was a Research Associate and Associate Writer for the Research Resource Division for Refugees RRDR at Carleton University and was a part of a team in conducting a research on Building Capacity for Welcoming Communities: Resources for Immigrant-Serving Organizations to Understand and Fight Racism. She worked for other organizations such as: Peacebuild Canada/ Peacebuilding Gender Working Group, Nobel Women's Initiative, Kings County Learning Association, Human Resources and Skills Development Canada(HRSDC) and taught as a substitute teacher in some High Schools in Annapolis Valley in NS after obtaining the Nova Scotia Teachers 'Certificate. Back in Iraq, Awatef Rasheed obtained a Bachelor of Education, English Department, University of Basra in 1979 and taught English as a Second Language at community college level such as: The Fine Arts Institute in Basra City, Higher Institute for Teachers 'Training in Baghdad, Higher Institute for Teachers 'Training in Kirkuk, and Higher Institute for Teachers 'Training in Arbil. She taught English as a Second Language in Kayseri Province in Turkey. Awatef Rasheed was also a Media journalist, news anchor, for the Basra TV Directorate, Iraqi Ministry of Information (1972 -1986).

== Publications ==
- Sexual Violence at Wars and Post-conflict Situations, Chapter, in progress, 2010 (English)
- Dr. Nawal Al –Saádawi: A Feminist from the Arab World, Article, Asdaá Newspaper, Montreal, 2008; issue # 6 (Arabic)
- Honour Killing of Immigrant Girls in Canada, Article, Asdaá Newspaper, Montreal, 2008; issue # 8 (Arabic)
- Raping Women as a Political Destructive Tool, Asdaá Newspaper, Montreal, 2008; issue # 15 (Arabic)
- Silenced Iraqi Women: Real Experiences of Women in Iraq, Book, in progress (English)

== Arabic media ==
- Amman Jordan, August 10, 2010 "Domestic Violence Against Women: A Brief on its Types and Recommendations".
- Iraqi Women's League, July 10, 2010 "Political - Religious Sanctions Against Iraqi Women".
- The Iraqi Democratic Union in USA; January 4, 2011 "Iraqi Government: Masculinity and Trickiness".
- Voice of Iraq, November 8, 2011 "Oh Mary, Lady of Salvation, Save Us". Archived from the original on 2011-09-28.
- Iraqi Women's League, February 28, 2011 "No to Negotiations Under Threats of Iraqi Government: We'll Never forget the Blood of Iraqi Martyrs of Peaceful Demonstrations".
- Iraqi People ( Al- Nass), February 22, 2011 "Oh, Iraq.. Time to Stand Up for Yourself".

== Lectures ==
- Panel discussant at the 2009 International Women's Day "Women's Leadership" / Correctional Services of Canada, March 2009 (Ottawa)
- Invited lecturer at Carleton University: Gender, Migration and Development, June 2007
- National research participation (solicited by universities and women's organizations in Calgary, Halifax, and Winnipeg). Immigrant Women, Family Violence, and Pathways Out of Homelessness, Halifax, NS, 2006
- Harvard Law School (2005) Personal Law in Iraq; Boston/USA (lecture)
- John F. Kennedy School of Government (2005) Gender in Iraq, Boston/ USA (lecture)
- Lectures and panels against war at: Acadia University, Saint Mary's University, Dalhousie University, St. Francis Xavier University, St. Thomas University, and St. Stephen's University (NB), (2003–2006)
- The Pearson Peacekeeping Centre/ NS (2001)
