= Farouk Kaspaules =

Canadian artist

Farouk Kaspaules is an Iraqi-born Canadian artist of Assyrian origin, noted for his engravings and silk-screen photography.

== Life and career ==
Born in Baghdad, Kaspaules left Iraq in the mid-1970s for political reasons. After a brief stay in the United States, he chose Canada as his country of exile and settled in Ottawa. He received his art education at the University of Ottawa, graduating in 1989 with Bachelor degrees in Fine Arts and Art History.

He has contributed to the arts community in Canada through his active involvement in artist-run centres and community organizations.

He mixes traditional Arabic iconography with modern symbols to produce works that reflect themes of exile, cultural displacement and related social issues.

== Work ==
Kaspaules works in oils and mixed media. He also executes engravings and silk-screen photography.

During his first European exhibition in London, England, in 1993, he established links with other exiled artists from the Middle East, specifically from Iraq. These encounters led to a turning point in his artistic production, which became more politically explicit.

In 2001, Kaspaules's installation …and at night we leave our dreams on window sill, memory of a place (2000) was included in the major exhibition The Lands within Me: Expressions by Canadian Artists of Arab Origin, which opened at the Canadian Museum of History soon after the September 11 attacks.

In 2016, Kaspaule exhibited works in There’s Room: Ottawa Artists Respond to the Refugee Crisis, held at Gallery 101.

Kaspaules has participated in some 20 solo and collective exhibitions in Canada, England, Hungary, France, Chile and Brazil.

== Solo exhibitions ==
- 1993- A Personal Memory, Kufa Gallery, London, England
- 1995 - Non Sequitur
- 2000 - The Lands Within Me – Memory of a Place
- 2003 - State of Things
- 2003 - The 9th International Cairo Biennale, Cairo, Egypt
- 2004 - Crossing Borders
- 2005 - Traces
- 2006 - Iconoclast
- 2007 - Be/Longing Ottawa Art Gallery, Ottawa, Canada
- 2008 - Inhabitants, Centre d'exposition L'Imagier, Aylmer, Quebec

== See also ==
- Iraqi art
- Islamic art
