= Edward J. Lewis =

American businessman and philanthropist (1937–2006)

- Born: Edward J. Lebowitz; May 30, 1937; Ellwood City, Pennsylvania, US
- Died: November 30, 2006 (aged 69); Pittsburgh, Pennsylvania, US
- Education: B.A. University of Pennsylvania; J.D. University of Pennsylvania Law School
- Occupations: Businessman, investor, philanthropist, lawyer
- Known for: Founder of Oxford Development Company
- Spouse: Anne Lewis
- Children: 4

Edward J. "Eddie" Lewis (May 30, 1937 – November 30, 2006) was an American businessman, investor, and philanthropist.

== Early life and education ==
Lewis was born in Ellwood City, Pennsylvania, the son of Eugene Lebowitz, a Hungarian Jewish immigrant who lost family members to the Holocaust. After graduating from the Wharton School at the University of Pennsylvania and the University of Pennsylvania Law School on a full scholarship, he embarked upon a brief law career in Philadelphia before moving back to his native Pittsburgh. On the advice of his father, Lewis changed his name from Lebowitz to Lewis to avoid antisemitism.

== Career ==
In the mid-1960s, Lewis joined the Don Mark Realty, a partnership founded by his father; his brother-in-law, Mark Mason; Harold “Harry” Soffer; and Soffer's son; Donald Soffer. Lewis quickly assumed leadership of the family firm, which would later be renamed Oxford Development Company. In 1965, at age 28, Lewis and his partners embarked on an ambitious project to develop South Hills Village, Pittsburgh’s first indoor mall and one of the first two-story enclosed shopping malls in the United States.

In 1967, with funding from the John Hancock Life Insurance Company, Oxford Development partnered with the Arlen Realty and Development Corporation to form the DonArl Partnership and bought 785 acres of mostly swampland in South Florida for $6 million. Originally named Turnberry, they renamed the site Aventura from the Spanish word for "adventure" after Lewis reportedly remarked "What an adventure this is going to be." Lewis and his partners set about to build an upper class development centered around the Aventura Country Club with a golf course designed by architect Robert Trent Jones. The project required that they drain the swamps (to the ire of environmental activists) and re-zone the property from residential single family to high-rise development (to the ire of controlled-growth advocates). With the support of then governor, Claude Kirk, the development went ahead. In 1969, Metro-Dade County approved the 23,900 condo unit master plan which included the construction of a fire station, a library, and a causeway to Sunny Isles Beach. They completed the first stage in 1970 and by 1977 had completed the golf course and added another 4,000 units. The venture was very profitable as they purchased land at $5,000 and acre and sold plots for as high as $2 million an acre in 1981.

In 1977, the partnership with Arlen Realty was dissolved over disputes about the quality of construction and the partners divided the properties. In 1983, Arlen Realty defaulted on a $39 million mortgage and went into Chapter 11 bankruptcy and Lewis and his partners purchased the remaining 68 acres of undeveloped land and built the Aventura Mall, among other high-profile projects in South Florida. Soon after, Lewis sold his interest to Donald Soffer who formed Turnberry Associates while Lewis kept the Oxford Development Company name. Lewis' firm quickly flourished into the multi-faceted real estate development corporation that is Oxford Development Company.

Among his business accomplishments, Eddie Lewis is credited for developing the first two-story enclosed shopping mall in the United States, South Hills Village in suburban Pittsburgh, and virtually conceptualizing the modern American regional shopping mall thereafter. Additionally, Lewis was instrumental in developing much of what has become Aventura, FL, a city which he named, in South Florida, with developments including Aventura Mall, Turnberry Isle Resort and Club, and numerous high-end residential projects. Lewis' achievements in commercial real estate span numerous states and range from spiraling urban skyscrapers to suburban retail centers. Monroeville Mall in the Pittsburgh metropolitan area and the One Oxford Centre skyscraper in downtown Pittsburgh were also projects led by Lewis and his Oxford Development. Both Lewis and Edward J. DeBartolo, Sr. were partners in the One Oxford Centre skyscraper project and made an offer to purchase the Pittsburgh Pirates major league baseball team in 1981.

Lewis was the chairman of the board of his family-owned company, which continues to be a prominent player in commercial and residential real estate.

== Personal life and death ==
Lewis died on November 30, 2006, from complications related to lung cancer. The family-owned company has been passed on to his wife, Anne, his four children, his sister Myrna and his brother-in-law Mark Mason. Longtime executive Steven J. Guy currently leads the company's day-to-day operations. Services were held at Rodef Shalom Congregation in Shadyside, Pittsburgh. Lewis was a generous donor to countless philanthropic causes, supporting the United Jewish Federation, the Children’s Museum of Pittsburgh, Carnegie Mellon University, the University of Pennsylvania, and the ALS Association.

Lewis belonged to the older generation of Pittsburgh real estate developers – such as Joseph Soffer, Jack Buncher, Stanley Gumberg, and Leonard Rudolph – who conducted business with a handshake. Despite keeping a low profile with the press, Lewis' famed yacht Monkey Business became an internationally known household name after a visit by Presidential-hopeful Gary Hart sunk his political campaign.
