= JHF =

JHF may refer to:

- Jordan Handball Federation
- Jewish Healthcare Foundation, American public charity
- John Hancock Financial, American insurance provider
- Jason Horne-Francis, Australian footballer
