= East Hills Shopping Center =

East Hills Shopping Center may refer to:

- East Hills Shopping Center (Missouri), formerly East Hills Mall, a shopping mall in St. Joseph, Missouri
- East Hills Shopping Center (Pennsylvania), a defunct shopping mall in Pittsburgh, Pennsylvania
