= South Hills Village =

Shopping mall near Pittsburgh, Pennsylvania, U.S.

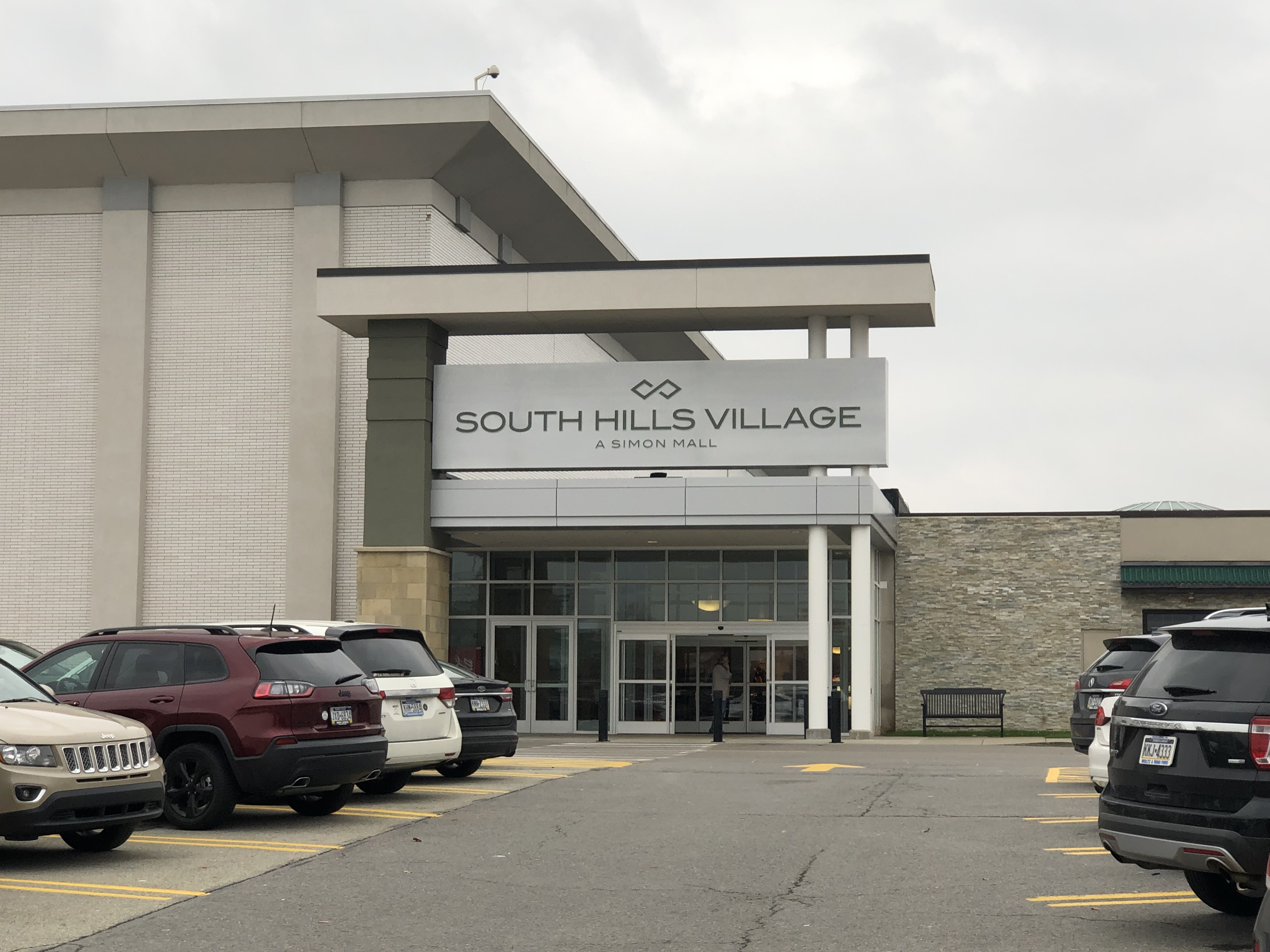
- Location: Bethel Park, Pennsylvania, U.S.
- Coordinates: 40°20′36.43″N 80°3′17.11″W
- Address: Washington Road (U.S. 19) and Fort Couch Road
- Opened: July 28, 1965; 61 years ago
- Developer: Oxford Development Company
- Manager: Simon Property Group
- Owner: Simon Property Group
- Num. of stores: 140
- Num. of anchor tenants: 4
- Floor area: 1,128,403 sq ft (104,832.1 m^{2})
- Floors: 2 (1 in Target, 3 in Macy's, 3 in office portion)
- Public transit: South Hills Village: Blue Line – South Hills Village Red Line – South Hills Village Port Authority bus: 36; Freedom Transit bus: Metro Commuter Saturday
- Website: www.simon.com/mall/south-hills-village

South Hills Village is a two-level shopping mall that is located in the Pittsburgh suburbs of Bethel Park and Upper St. Clair Township, Pennsylvania, United States. The mall's anchor stores are Macy's, Von Maur, Target, Dick's Sporting Goods, and Barnes & Noble.

== History ==
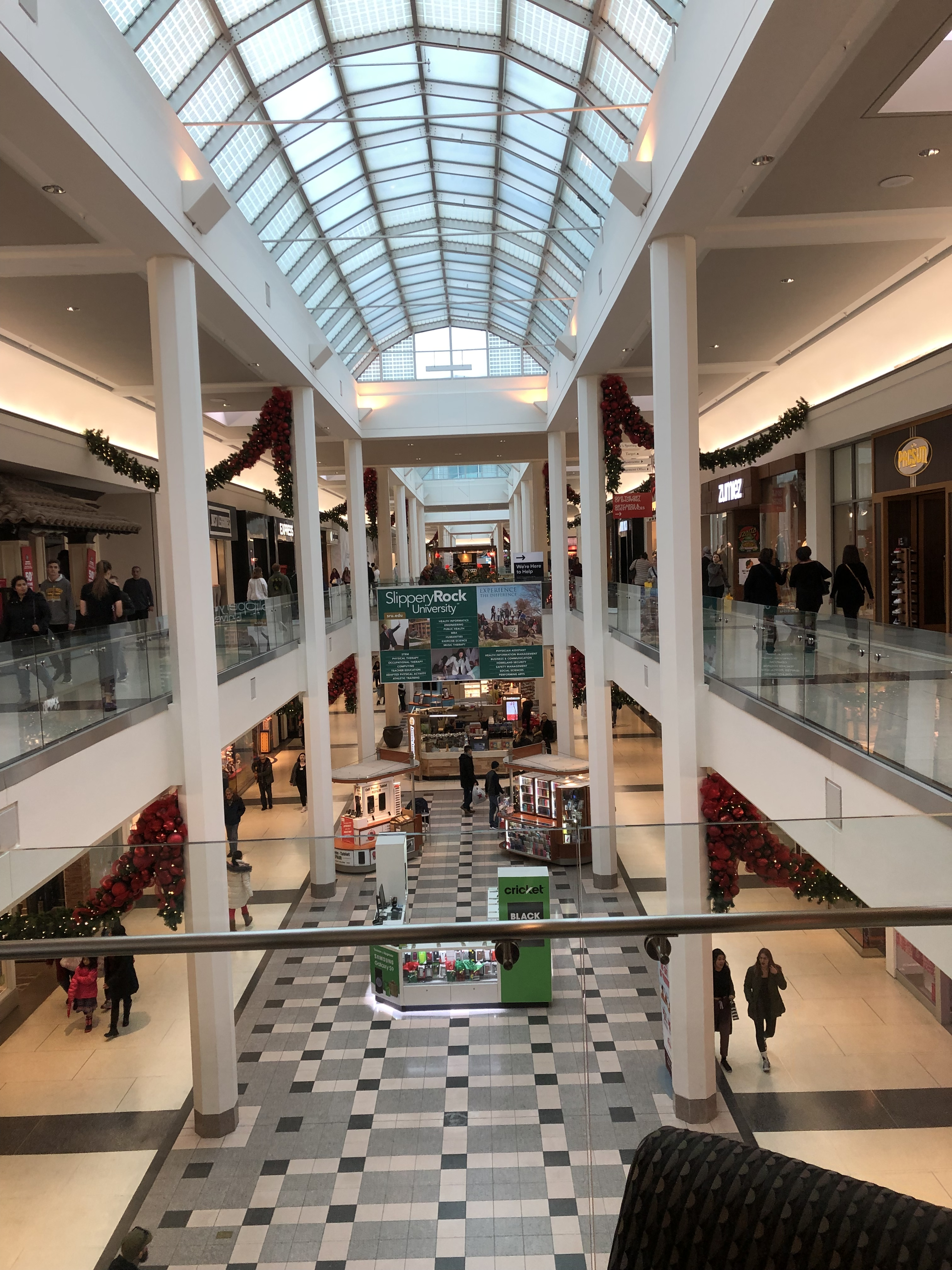
Corridor near Macy's

This mall was originally developed during the mid-1960s by the Oxford Development Co. It was the first shopping complex in Greater Pittsburgh to be built as a fully enclosed structure and was the largest in Greater Pittsburgh until the Monroeville Mall, also built by the Oxford Development Company, opened in 1969.

The two-level complex is currently owned by Simon Property Group, which acquired it in 1997. It is anchored by Macy's (formerly Horne's and Lazarus), Dick's Sporting Goods, Target, and Von Maur (formerly Sears). Dick's Sporting Goods and Target were formerly Gimbels, Kaufmann's and Boscov's.

The mall features more than 134 specialty stores. The mall also houses a food court and several professional offices.

Located across the street from Macy's is the South Hills Village light rail station. This terminal opened for revenue service in July 1985.

The vacant three-story Boscov's store (formerly Kaufmann's and Gimbels) was converted for use by Target and Dick's Sporting Goods. This allowed Target to enter Pittsburgh's South Hills market where limited land for new development had precluded a new store. It also allowed Dick's Sporting Goods to open a much larger store to replace the small location that was formerly situated on the mall's periphery. Target operates on an expanded first level of the space with Dick's Sporting Goods taking the second and third floors, though the third floor is only accessible from within the Dick's Sporting Goods store. Dick's Sporting Goods had its grand opening October 17, 2012 and Target opened March 6, 2013.

In 2014, plans were announced to redesign/modernize the mall. This included a new food court, more stores, and general additions to the building, including the installation of escalators to replace the existing stairwells on each side of the mall. The remodel was finished in 2016.

On May 31, 2018, it was announced that Sears would close its anchor store. It closed in September 2018.

On August 16, 2018, a major fire sprinkler system pipe burst problem occurred, causing a portion of the ceiling to collapse. Ten stores in the area of where the burst pipe was had to be closed temporarily, which included the Apple Store, Victoria's Secret, and Oil & Vinegar. Simon Property Group shortly announced that the broken sprinkler pipe would be replaced, and the area around where the burst pipe was would be temporarily closed for repairs.

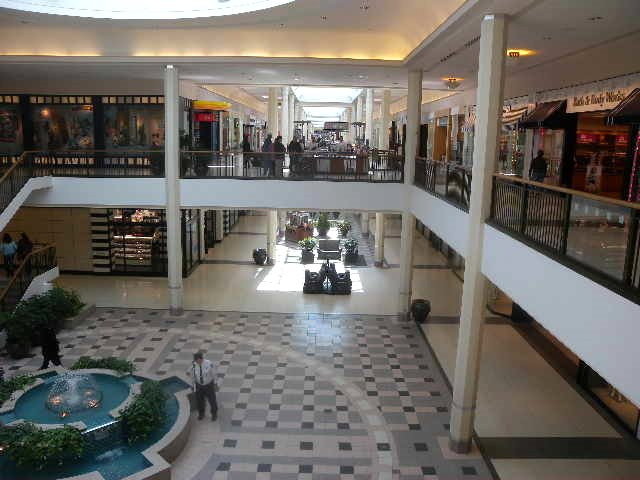
North courtyard (pre-remodel)

The former Sears anchor building began demolition beginning fall 2022 and rebuilt through the first half of 2024, to meet the demands of a 118,000 square foot Von Maur store, the chain's first Pennsylvania location. The store opened on November 9, 2024.
