= Joseph Soffer =

American real estate developer (1913–2006)

- Born: 1913; Duquesne, Pennsylvania, U.S.
- Died: June 13, 2006 (aged 94); Pittsburgh, Pennsylvania, U.S.
- Occupations: Businessman, investor, philanthropist
- Known for: Founder of the Soffer Organization
- Spouse: Violet Gusky
- Children: R. Damian Soffer; James Lee Soffer
- Parent(s): Lena Haber Soffer; Jacob Soffer
- Family: Donald Soffer (nephew)

Joseph Soffer (1913 – June 13, 2006) was an American businessman, investor, and philanthropist.

== Early life and education ==
Soffer was one of four children born to a Jewish family in 1913 in Duquesne, Pennsylvania, the son of Lena (née Haber) and Jacob Soffer. His parents were immigrants from Eastern Europe. His father owned a grocery store where he worked as a teenager. He had three siblings: Sylvia Chotiner, Harry Soffer, and Ruth Pressman. Soffer began his business career upon graduating from Duquesne High School after which he started to invest in real estate by purchasing single-family homes and small apartment buildings. During World War II, he served in the United States Army Air Corps Transportation Command where he was stationed at Love Field in Texas.

== Business career ==
After the war, he formed Soffer Realty in McKeesport, Pennsylvania with his brother Harry (the father of Donald Soffer). They built the Norwin Shopping Center in Irwin, Pennsylvania and operated the Baldoc Hills Golf Club also in Irwin. In 1960, he partnered with Benjamin Thorpe and built the 7-building Penn Center East in Wilkins Township, Pennsylvania - one of the first suburban office parks around Pittsburgh - which was unique at that time as it contained not only office space (700,000 square feet) but also retail (300,000 square feet) and residential (448 units). The project was completed in 1964, the same year he established the Soffer Organization. In 1985, he completed a similar project named Penn Center West in Robinson Township, Pennsylvania. He remained as chairman of the Soffer Organization until his death, which at the time owned 2 million square feet of office, retail and residential property in the Pittsburgh area.

== Philanthropy and awards ==
While stationed in Texas, he joined the Masonic Order (rising to the 32nd Degree) and the Shriners. In 2004, Soffer received a lifetime achievement award from the National Association of Industrial and Office Properties. He also supported a number Jewish charities as well as the Children's Hospital of Pittsburgh and the Pittsburgh Symphony. He and his wife established the Violet and Joseph Soffer Foundation and Family Special Olympics at the Jewish Community Center of Greater Pittsburgh.

== Personal life ==
Soffer was married to Violet Gusky, a native of Braddock, Pennsylvania whom he met while on leave from the Army. The couple lived in Squirrel Hill until his death on June 13, 2006 at UPMC Presbyterian in Oakland. Services were held at the Tree of Life Congregation and he was buried at the Temple B'nai Israel Cemetery in Versailles, Pennsylvania. They had two sons R. Damian Soffer and James Lee Soffer. His son R. Damiam is the current CEO and president of the Soffer Organization.

Soffer belonged to the older generation of Pittsburgh real estate developers - such as Edward J. Lewis, Jack Buncher, Stanley Gumberg, and Leonard Rudolph - who conducted business with a handshake. Soffer believed that the key to his success was taking advantage of opportunities: “Just remember one thing: You can't catch the same streetcar twice."
