= PPG Place =

Building complex in downtown Pittsburgh, Pennsylvania

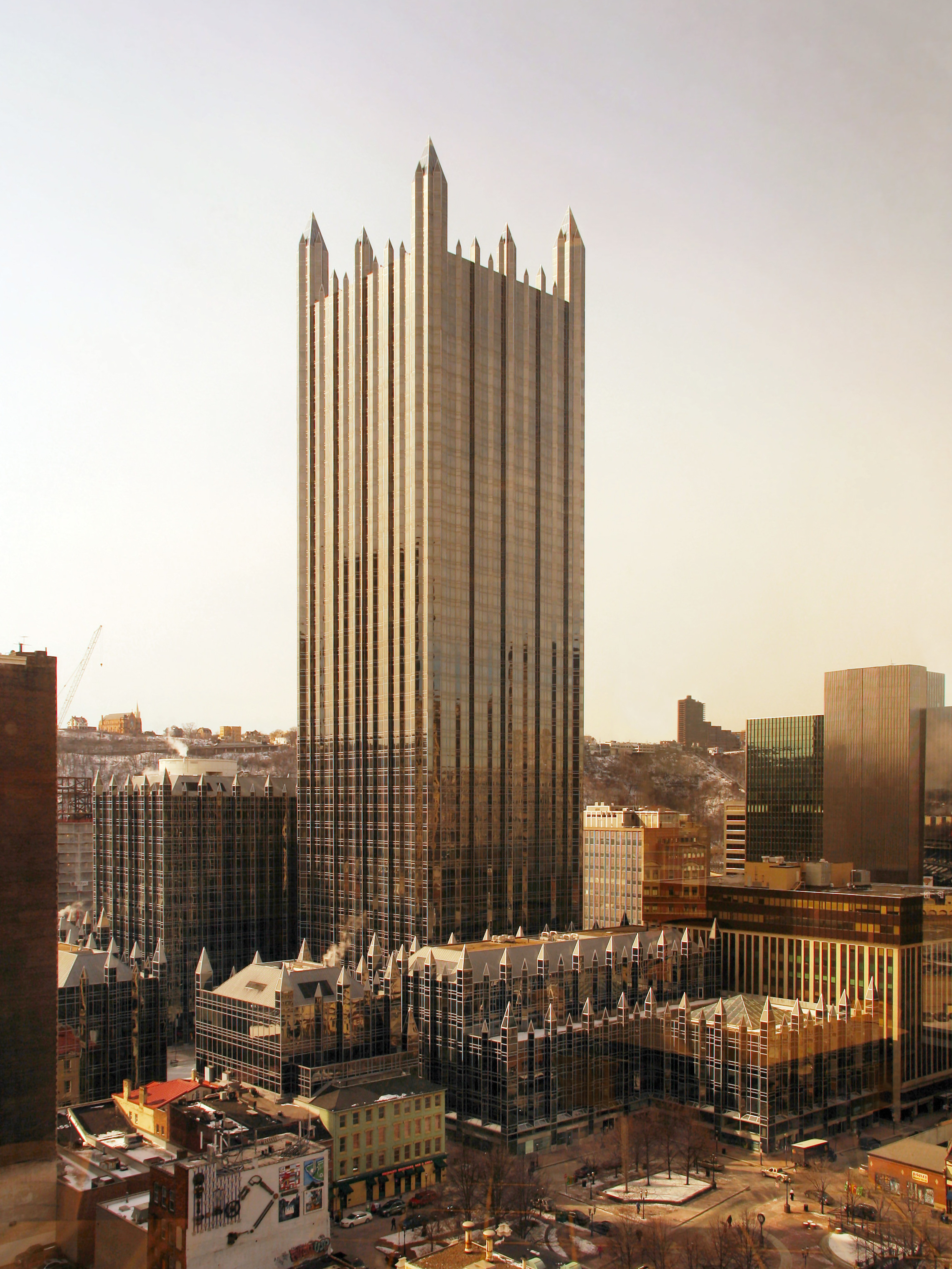
- Interactive map of the PPG Place area

General information
- Type: Commercial offices
- Architectural style: Postmodern
- Location: 1 PPG Place; Pittsburgh, Pennsylvania
- Coordinates: 40.4398°N 80.0032°W
- Construction started: January 28, 1981
- Completed: April 11, 1984
- Cost: US$200 million ($667.2 million today)
- Owner: Highwood Properties
- Operator: Highwood Properties

Height
- Antenna spire: 193.55 m (635.0 ft)
- Roof: 166 m (545 ft)

Technical details
- Floor count: 40
- Floor area: 1,499,983 sq ft (139,353.0 m^{2})
- Lifts/elevators: 23

Design and construction
- Architects: Philip Johnson; John Burgee
- Developer: Johnson/Burgee Architects
- Structural engineer: Leslie E. Robertson & Associates, R.L.L.P.
- Main contractor: Mellon Stuart Construction and Blount Brothers Construction, Joint Venture

Other information
- Parking: 700

Website
- www.ppgplace.com

PPG Place is a complex in downtown Pittsburgh, Pennsylvania, consisting of six buildings within three city blocks and five and a half acres. PPG Place was designed by architects Philip Johnson and John Burgee.

Named for its anchor tenant, PPG Industries, which initiated the project for its headquarters, the buildings are all of matching glass design consisting of 19,750 pieces of glass. The complex centers on One PPG Place, a 40-story office building. Groundbreaking ceremonies occurred on January 28, 1981. The complex buildings opened between 1983 and 1984, and a dedication ceremony took place on April 11, 1984. Total cost of construction was $200 million ($667.2 million today). The buildings were sold by The Hillman Company to Highwoods Properties in 2011.

== Construction ==
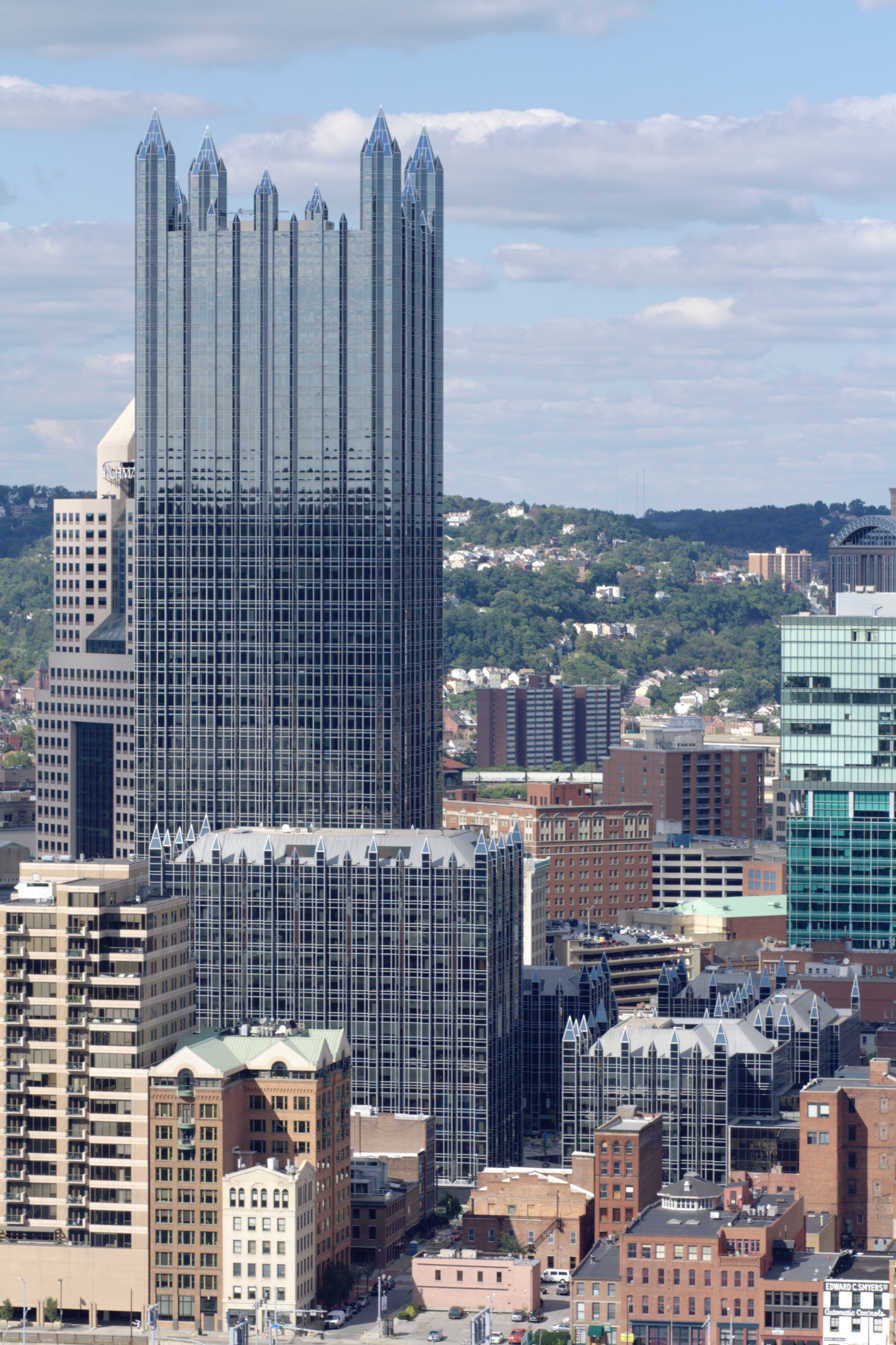
The complex as seen from Mount Washington.

The project was started by PPG Industries (formerly Pittsburgh Plate Glass Company) to serve as the company's headquarters, after being based in Downtown Pittsburgh since 1895. The company contracted the project to architect Philip Johnson and his partner John Burgee. Designed in the neogothic style but with modern innovations, the complex had many inspirations, including London's Victoria Tower, and H. H. Richardson's Allegheny County Courthouse and Charles Klauder's Cathedral of Learning in Pittsburgh. Before the building was constructed, an 8-foot-tall, 600 pound model was made, with glass cut at the Ford City PPG works.

During demolition and preparation of the site, a team of University of Pittsburgh anthropologists collected over 10,000 artifacts dating to the 18th century in what was the Kings Garden and Kings Orchard about 1,000 feet from the gate to Fort Pitt, as well as many medical instruments denoting facilities in the area. The team also discovered several stone-lined wells and cisterns dating to around 1800 that were subsequently filled with refuse and artifacts in the early 1800s as the early settlement expanded and the wells went dry. The site was the home of the four-story Guskey's Department Store for much of the 20th century.

The buildings are recognized by their 231 glass spires, with the largest one 82 feet (25 m) tall. Also notable are the surfaces of reflective insulating glass, that served to advertise the project's founder. The buildings contain over one million square feet of PPG's Solarban 550 Twindow - 19,750 pieces. The primary building, One PPG Place, is a 40-story tower, with PPG Industries occupying half of the space. The complex also contains a 14-story building, and four 6-story structures. PPG Industries also uses space in one of the other buildings. The lobby of One PPG is a 50-foot (15 m)-high entrance that features red glass. The building has 21 elevators, each with walls constructed of clear glass panels enclosing fractured glass. In total, the complex cost $200 million.

The design of the building not only made it distinct, but created high energy-efficiency. Heat in the summer is reflected away from the building by the glass, while in winter infrared heat is reflected and contained within the building. The surface walls feature a barrier construction that effectively separates the interior walls from the exterior. The building also collects heat from computer equipment and recycles it throughout the structure.

Construction of the building highlighted Pittsburgh's "Renaissance II period", which saw the Pittsburgh economy weather steel mill closures, while Pittsburgh Plate Glass remained a Fortune 500 company.

Office space opened in August 1983, the retail shops opened in November 1984, and the complex was dedicated on April 11, 1984.

== Buildings and public spaces ==
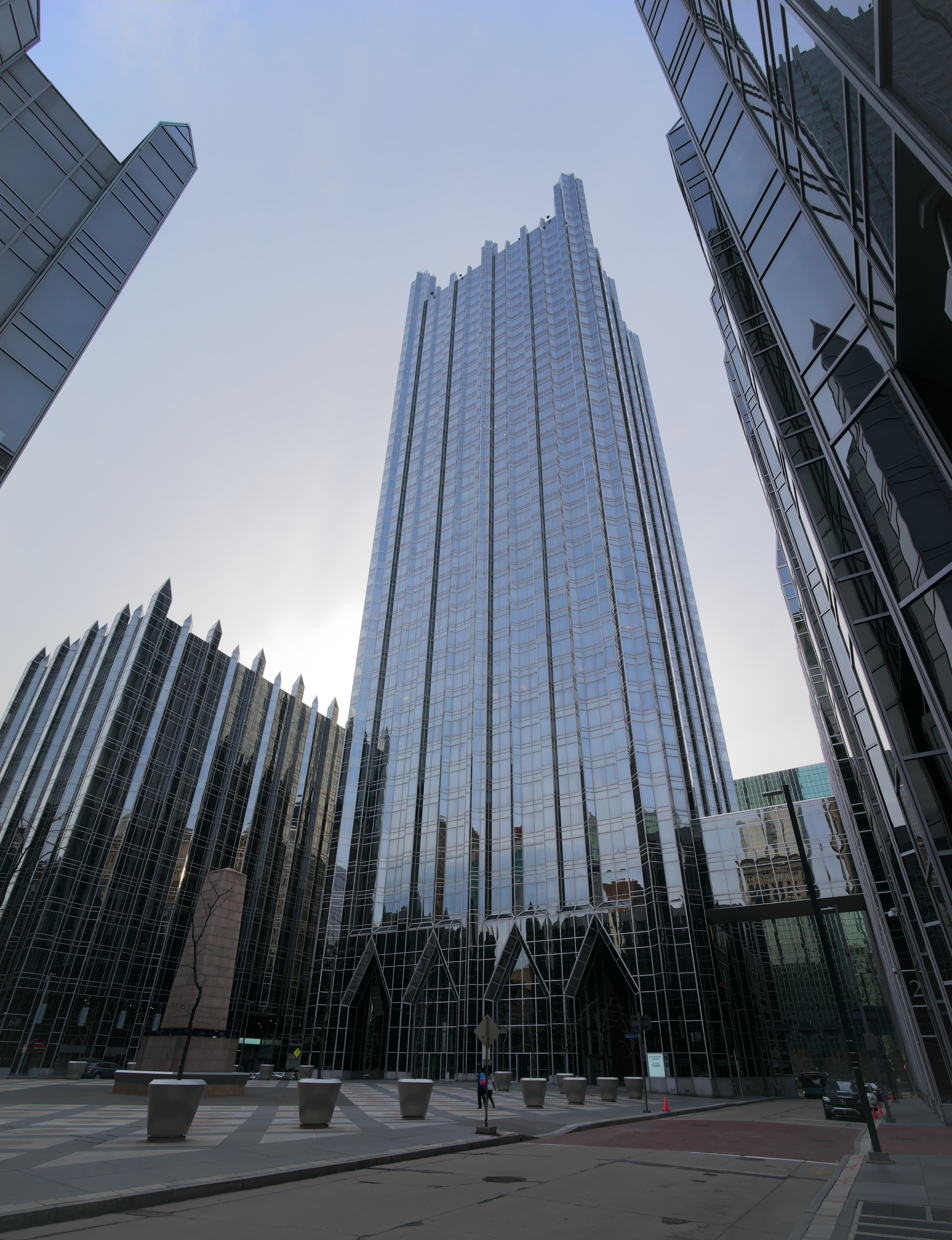
PPG Place buildings surrounding the public plaza

PPG Place sits on six city blocks (5 1/2 acres, 22,000 m^{2}) bound by Forbes Avenue and the Boulevard of the Allies on its north and south sides, and Stanwix Street and Wood Street to its east and west. The complex consists of six buildings, which surround an open-air plaza:

- One PPG Place, a 40-floor building with a height of 635 feet (194 m), and a total capacity of approximately 1.5 million square feet (140,000 m^{2}). This is the tallest building in the complex, serving as the complex's centerpiece, and as of 2020 is the third tallest building in Pittsburgh.
- Two PPG Place, a 6-floor building.
- Three PPG Place, a 6-floor building.
- Four PPG Place, a 6-floor building.
- Five PPG Place, a 6-floor building.
- Six PPG Place, a 14-floor building with a height of 223 feet (68 m).

One PPG Place includes the Wintergarden, an 8,000 square feet (740 m^{2}) event space with vaulted glass ceilings. While the Wintergarden is part of One PPG Place, it does not sit within the 40-story tower portion of the building. Instead, it is attached to the side of the tower, facing Stanwix Street.

PPG Place is directly adjacent to Market Square, creating a large and popular public space in downtown Pittsburgh.

=== PPG Place Plaza ===
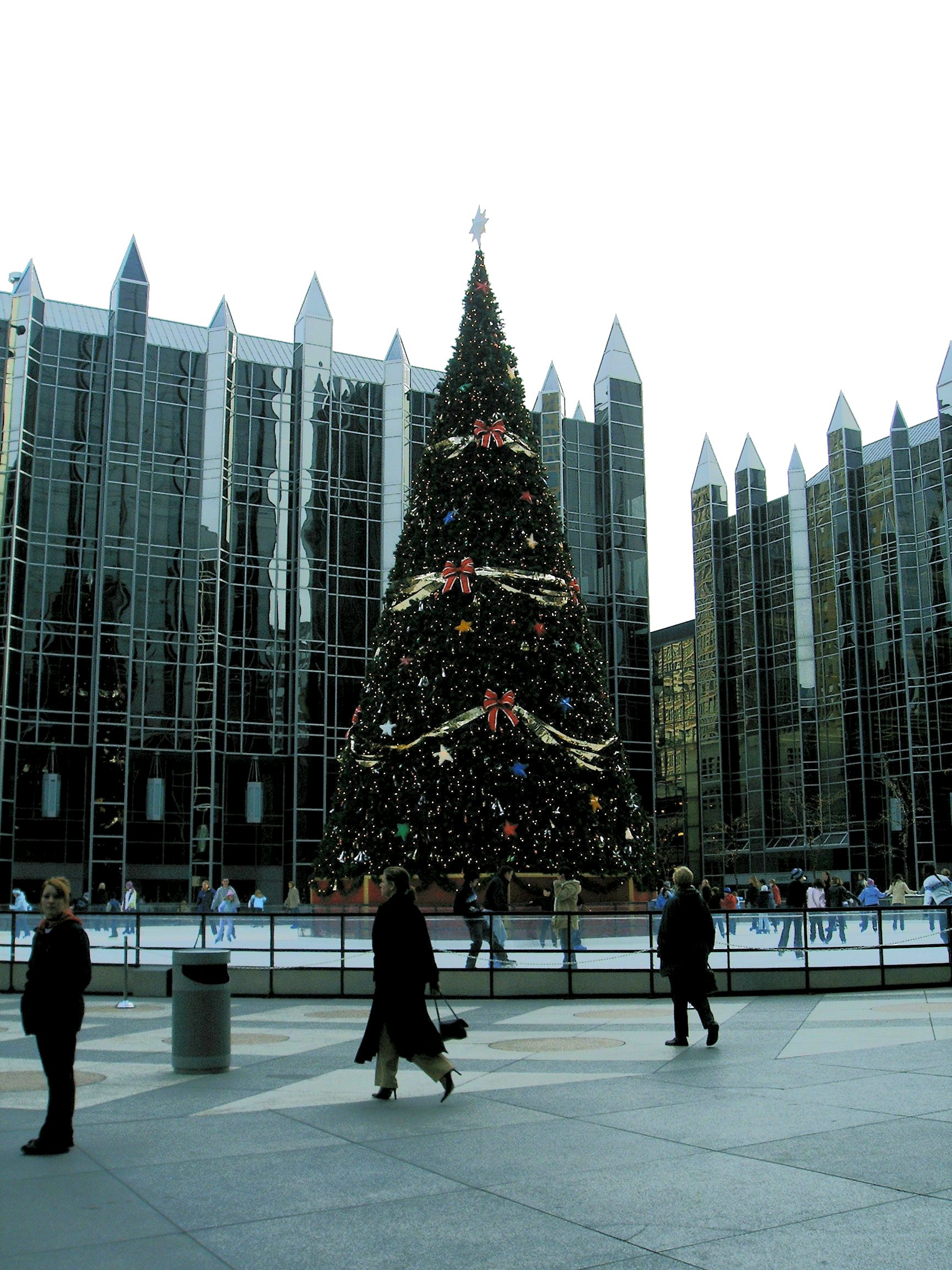
The Rink at PPG Place

The one-acre (4,000 m^{2}) PPG Place Plaza sits between Third Avenue and Fourth Avenue. The plaza features a fountain with 140 water jets and uses 280 underground lights. Opened in 2003, it was designed by WET and SWA Group landscape architecture and urban design. At the center of the fountain is a pink granite obelisk.

During the winter months, the plaza is converted into an ice skating rink. The rink opened on December 10, 2001, and has become a popular seasonal attraction in downtown. A 60-foot (18 m) Christmas tree is in the center of the rink. At 13,456 square feet (1,250.1 m^{2}), the surface is over 6,000 square feet (560 m^{2}) larger than the famous rink in New York's Rockefeller Center.

== Reception ==
Upon completion of the project, architectural critics and the media called PPG Place "the crown jewel in Pittsburgh's skyline," "the towering success of downtown Pittsburgh," and "one of the most ambitious, sensitive and public spirited urban developments since Rockefeller Center." In 2006, readers of the Pittsburgh City Paper voted PPG Place as the best building in Pittsburgh.

In 2005, when the vacancy rate of downtown offices was around 20%, PPG Place was between 87 and 89% full. The management company was able to attract out-of-town corporations to relocate operations to Pittsburgh. News America Marketing, a subsidiary of News Corporation, occupies 5,800 square feet (540 m^{2}). Local Kennametal Inc. rented office space, and LandAmerica Financial Group relocated several area office locations to the 12th floor of One PPG Place. Carnegie Mellon University operates alumni relations from the complex.

== See also ==
- List of tallest buildings in Pittsburgh

| Preceded by Fifth Avenue Place | Pittsburgh Skyscrapers by Height; 635 feet (194 m); 40 floors | Succeeded by BNY Mellon Center |
| Preceded by Oxford Centre | Pittsburgh Skyscrapers by Year of Completion; 1984 | Succeeded by EQT Plaza |
