= North Hills Village =

- Location: Ross Township, Allegheny County, Pennsylvania, United States
- Coordinates: 40.52505°N 80.00656°W
- Opened: 1957 (original mall only) 1996 (current strip mall)
- Closed: 1996 (original mall only)
- Owner: J.J. Gumberg Co.
- Num. of anchor tenants: 5
- Floor area: 616,460 square feet (60,000 m^{2})
- Floors: 1
- Public transit: Port Authority bus: 2

North Hills Village is a retail complex on McKnight Road in Ross Township, Allegheny County, Pennsylvania, United States, owned by J.J. Gumberg Co. since 1986. It was opened as a strip mall in 1957, with Gimbels as its center piece anchor tenant. It was enclosed in 1976 before reverting to a strip mall in 1996.

In 1984, Gimbels department store, which had been in the complex for 27 years and was the largest store there, announced it would move into Ross Park Mall, then under construction, when its lease expired in 1986. Merchants expressed confidence that the mall would survive the loss although it might become a discount mall. It was confirmed in July 1987 that it would become a "value-orientated center" with four anchor stores: Burlington Coat Factory, Hills Department Stores, T.J. Maxx and Marshalls.

In 1996, renovation began on the south end of the mall to return it to a strip mall with large speciality stores that had entrances that opened directly onto the parking lot while the northern end of the mall was to remain enclosed; the mall would then have a total of 490,000 square feet (46,000 m^{2}) of retail space. Further work took place to return the mall to a strip mall in 2005 with the mall's center court becoming part of a larger Burlington Coat Factory store. The size of the mall was then 616,460 square feet (57,271 m^{2}) of gross leasable area with the anchor stores being Burlington Coat Factory, Kohl's, Shop 'n Save, Best Buy and Staples. Other stores in the mall included Taco Bell, Applebee's, Duro Cleaners and Millennium Oriental Buffet and 10 smaller stores. A new 125,000-square-foot (11,600 m^{2}) Target store was built in 2006 on the site vacated by Burlington Coat Factory.
