= Jack Buncher =

American businessman, investor and philanthropist

- Born: 1911; Pittsburgh, Pennsylvania
- Died: December 4, 2001 (age 90); Palm Beach, Florida
- Occupations: Businessman, investor, philanthropist
- Known for: Founder of the Buncher Company
- Spouses: Renee Buncher; Elaine Buncher; Joan Buncher
- Children: with Renee: --Bernita Buncher Balter with Elaine: --Stephen Buncher

Jack Buncher (October 3, 1911 – December 4, 2001) was an American businessman, investor, and philanthropist.

== Biography ==
Buncher was born to a Russian Jewish immigrant family. In 1917, Harry, his father opened a scrap yard, the Liberty Scrap Co. at 3131 Liberty Avenue. Although he studied medicine and law at Duquesne University, he returned to the family business in 1931 due to the advent of the Great Depression. In 1935, at the age of 24, he took over his father's scrap yard business then stretching four blocks in the Strip District. During World War II, the business grew due to the demands of the war effort. After the war, he founded the Buncher Company and expanded his operations by opening another scrap yard on the North Side with a focus on scrap steel as well establishing operations in Philadelphia and Mobile, Alabama where he scrapped Liberty ships and other military equipment. Using the windfall proceeds from his previous business venture, Buncher began to acquire old railroads and rail lines as means to the hold the properties and rail lines for a period of time so as to scrap the rails and the ties to resell them later for a profit. This also led him to delve into general real estate investments when he began to purchase property throughout the city and region including the West End, the South Side, the North Side, and Westmoreland County and Beaver County, becoming one of the city's largest real estate investors and property owners. In the 1950s, he developed the region's first industrial park in Leetsdale, Pennsylvania. In 1960s, he sold his scrap yard on the North Side to the Pittsburgh Urban Redevelopment Authority for the construction of Three Rivers Stadium. In the 1980s, he a sold the right of way to establish the West Busway. In the 1990s, he sold the land for Washington's Landing. Upon his death, Buncher left behind one of the largest real estate portfolios seen in Pittsburgh.

== Philanthropy ==
In 1974, Buncher created The Buncher/Rubinoff Foundation, later named The Buncher Family Foundation, then finally The Jack Buncher Foundation . Upon his death, he donated 100% of The Buncher Company stock to charity with 55% going to the Jack Buncher Foundation and 9% each to the Carnegie Library of Pittsburgh, Carnegie Mellon University, the Jewish Federation of Greater Pittsburgh, the Pittsburgh Foundation, and the New York-based American Jewish Joint Distribution Committee. The stock was worth $197 million at the time. The Buncher Company will pay dividends to its shareholders. The bylaws of the Buncher Foundation provide for eventual disbursement of all Buncher Foundation assets. In 1989, he partnered with the Jewish Federation and Joint Distribution Committee, to establish The Buncher Leadership Program for troubled and isolated Jewish communities; alumni of the program are called "Buncherians."

== Personal life ==
Buncher was married three times. He had one child with his first wife, Renee: Bernita Lee Buncher and one child with second wife, Elaine: Stephen Buncher of Florida. His third wife was Joan. He died in Palm Beach, Florida at the age of 90. Services were held at the Rodef Shalom Synagogue in Shadyside.

Buncher belonged to the older generation of Pittsburgh real estate developers - such as Edward J. Lewis, Joseph Soffer, Stanley Gumberg, and Leonard Rudolph - who conducted business with a handshake. Buncher was known for being a tough negotiator and rarely sold the property he purchased: "Once you sell it, you don't have it anymore."
