= Stanley Gumberg =

American businessman, investor, philanthropist and sailor

- Born: Stanley R. Gumberg; May 30, 1927; Pittsburgh, Pennsylvania, U.S.
- Died: February 16, 2009 (aged 81); Pittsburgh, Pennsylvania, U.S.
- Education: Duquesne University (BA)
- Occupations: Businessman, investor, philanthropist, sailor
- Known for: Chairman of J.J. Gumberg Co.
- Spouse: Marcia Morgan
- Children: 3

Stanley R. Gumberg (May 30, 1927 – February 16, 2009) was an American businessman, investor, philanthropist, and sailor. He was chairman of J.J. Gumberg Co.

== Biography ==
Gumberg was born to a Jewish family in Pittsburgh on May 30, 1927, the son of Lillian (née Zimmer) and Joseph J. Gumberg. His father operated a real estate brokerage, J.J. Gumberg Company, which he founded in 1923. His wife owned and operated bookstores in the Pittsburgh neighborhoods of Squirrel Hill (where Gumberg was raised) and Shadyside. After graduating from Taylor Allderdice High School, he joined the United States Navy where he served as a medical assistant. Using the G.I. Bill, he graduated with a B.A. from Duquesne University in 1950 and then went to work for his father's firm. In 1964, after building the Quaker Village shopping center in Leetsdale, the focus of the company shifted to development. Thereafter, he presided over the development of some of the region's first shopping malls and expanded out of the state via a relationship with Walmart. At the time of his death, Gumberg controlled over 15 million square feet of retail properties in six states including the malls at Pittsburgh's Waterworks, Clearview Mall in Butler, and North Hills Village.

Buncher belonged to the older generation of Pittsburgh real estate developers––such as Edward J. Lewis, Joseph Soffer, Jack Buncher, and Leonard Rudolph––who conducted business with a handshake.

== Philanthropy ==
Gumberg was active in donating to educational and Jewish causes. Gumberg served on the board of Duquesne University—where the Gumberg Library is named in his honor—for over twenty years. He served as chairman of the board of Montefiore Hospital and presided over its sale in 1990 to form the Jewish Healthcare Foundation. He also served on the boards of Carnegie Mellon University (where he utilized his construction aptitude to oversee over $100 million in new projects); Seton Hill University; Westminster University, and the Urban League.

== Horse racing ==
For over 40 years, Gumberg owned and operated the thoroughbred racing stable, Skara Glen Stables in Greensburg, Pennsylvania. Famous progeny include Cinnomon Sugar, Weekend Madness, Red Roses Story, Jazil and Rags to Riches, along with the hunter, Corsani, and show jumper, Chinita.

== Personal life ==
He married Marcia Morgan soon after graduating high school; they had three sons: Ira, Lawrence, and Andrew. Gumberg and his wife were avid collectors of art and his wife chaired the board of the Carnegie Museum of Art. The couple were members of Rodef Shalom Congregation in Shadyside, Pittsburgh. He died of lung cancer on February 16, 2009, at his home in Pittsburgh. His son Ira J. Gumberg, purchased the family interest in J.J. Gumberg Co. from his two brothers and serves as its chairman and CEO; he is married to Anita Courcoulas. Gumberg's son, Lawrence, is president of Pittsburgh-based LG Realty Advisors Inc; he is married to Ina Gumberg. Gumberg's son, Andrew, is president and CEO of Fort Lauderdale-based Gumberg Asset Management Corp; he is divorced from Lorraine Abruzzo and since remarried to Christine "Christy" Ann McMullian.
