= One Oxford Centre =

Building in Pittsburgh

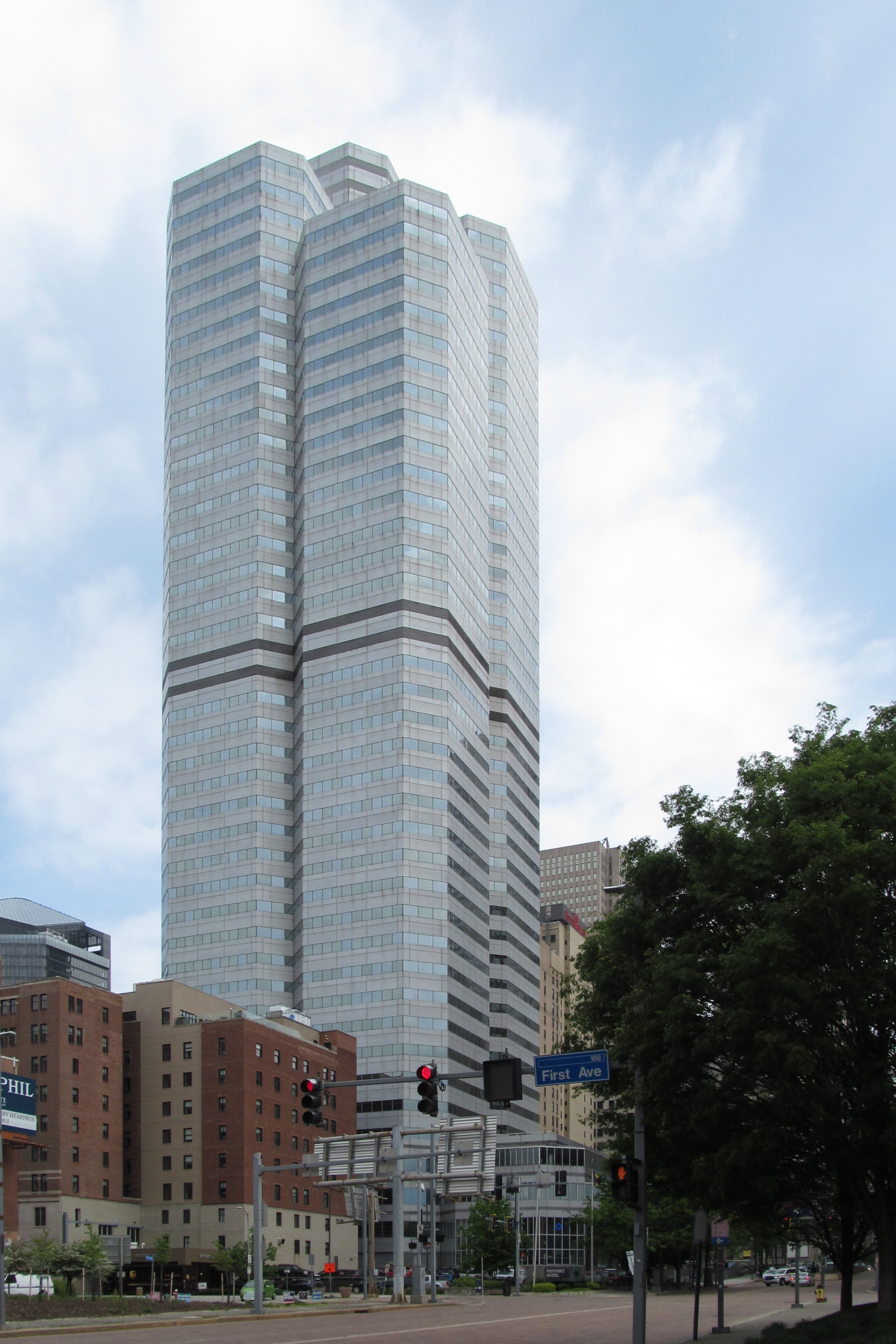
- One Oxford Centre in Pittsburgh
- Interactive map of the One Oxford Centre area

General information
- Type: Office
- Coordinates: 40°26′17″N 79°59′56″W
- Construction started: May 31, 1980
- Completed: April 1983
- Cost: $140 million

Height
- Roof: 615 ft (187 m)

Technical details
- Floor count: 45
- Floor area: 932,219 sq ft (86,606.0 m^{2})
- Lifts/elevators: 21

Design and construction
- Developer: Oxford Development Company
- Main contractor: DeBartolo Company

Other information
- Parking: 800

One Oxford Centre is a 45-story skyscraper in downtown Pittsburgh, Pennsylvania. The complex is named for Oxford Development Company, the developer and previous owner. Among the commercial tenants of One Oxford Centre are Buchanan Ingersoll & Rooney, HFF Inc., the Federal Reserve Bank of Cleveland Pittsburgh Branch, the Federal Home Loan Bank of Pittsburgh, and Morgan, Lewis & Bockius.

== History ==
The proposed tower was announced and submitted for county approval in October 1978 as the "Grant Land project". In April 1983, DeBartolo Company, which constructed the tower, announced plans for "Two Oxford Centre" to the immediate northeast of the main tower and across the street from Pittsburgh City Hall and the Frick Building. Two Oxford Centre was to be noticeably taller than One Oxford, however the plans and development were dependent on securing a majority tenant which never materialized.

Since developing the Property in 1983, Oxford Development had been the sole owner and operator. In January 2016 San Francisco-based Shorenstein Properties acquired One Oxford Centre under its Shorenstein Realty Investors Eleven LP, a $1.2 billion fund. CBRE Group was appointed as the leasing agent to fill up the remaining vacant space in the building. Shorenstein implemented an intensive capital improvement program that included repairing deferred maintenance throughout the property as well as aesthetic upgrades to the lobby and common areas.

== Design ==
Completed in 1983, One Oxford Centre has 46 floors in its main tower and rises 615 feet (187 m) above Downtown Pittsburgh. Although its address is simply One Oxford Centre, the building is located on the 300 block of Grant Street. The tower has nearly 1,500,000 square feet (140,000 m^{2}) of office and high-end retail space. Since the tower's opening, it has been home to a full-service health/business club, The Rivers Club. The complex also contains a multi-level parking garage and some street-level retail and office space one block west of Grant Street.

At night, forty-three 1,500-watt spotlights illuminate the centre with a total of 54,500 watts that create a glowing effect that is said to be greater than any other highrise in the United States. One Oxford Centre was developed by Oxford Development Company and designed by architecture firm Hellmuth, Obata, & Kassabaum.

The most significant external change to One Oxford Centre since its construction was the addition of the PricewaterhouseCoopers logo on all sides of the building in April 2023. One PPG Place now remains the tallest skyscraper in the city to lack branding on its façade.

== In popular culture ==
A composite image of the main tower of PPG Place and Oxford Centre is used as the Fiddler's Green luxury high-rise in the movie Land of the Dead. Another interesting fact is that a street (Cherry Way) passes through the tower on its lower levels.

The building is featured in Episode 1656 of the television program Mister Rogers' Neighborhood on "Up and Down." Mr. Rogers and the "Speed Delivery"-man Mr. McFeely ride the building's escalators and elevators up and down.

The tower is used for exterior shots of the Newman tower on the CBS daytime soap opera, The Young and the Restless.

== See also ==
- List of tallest buildings in Pittsburgh

| Preceded by Gulf Tower | Pittsburgh Skyscrapers by Height; 615 feet (187 m); 46 floors | Succeeded by Fifth Avenue Place |
| Preceded by Mellon Center | Pittsburgh Skyscrapers by Year of Completion; 1983 | Succeeded by PPG Place |
