= Jewish Healthcare Foundation =

Not-for-profit public charity based in Pittsburgh, Pennsylvania

The Jewish Healthcare Foundation (JHF) is a not-for-profit public charity based in Pittsburgh, Pennsylvania, that supports healthcare services, education, and research to encourage medical advancement and protect vulnerable populations.

== Mission ==
The mission of the Jewish Healthcare Foundation is to support and foster the provision of healthcare services, healthcare education, and when reasonable and appropriate, medical and scientific research, and to respond to the medical, custodial and other health-related needs of elderly, underprivileged, indigent and under-served persons in both the Jewish and general community throughout Western Pennsylvania.

Its president is Karen Wolk Feinstein, PhD, who established the Foundation as an important player in the Pittsburgh foundation world and in Pennsylvania and national health affairs. Though it continues to work diligently on all its original priorities, the Foundation has sharpened its focus on changes in the healthcare system that improve patient safety and healthcare quality, lower costs of care, and address healthcare workforce issues.

== Foundation ==
The Jewish Healthcare Foundation (JHF) was established in 1990 with proceeds from the sale of Montefiore Hospital, a healthcare institution financed and founded by Pittsburgh's Jewish community and the chaired by real estate developer Stanley Gumberg. The hospital opened in 1908 to meet the healthcare needs of a Jewish population that was both expanding and underserved at the time.

It became a respected teaching institution, pioneering advancements in medicine and public health benefiting the total community, and providing medical care in a compassionate environment and with an understanding of Jewish people and their needs. Renamed Montefiore University Hospital, the institution is today part of the University of Pittsburgh Medical Center.
