= Monroeville Mall =

Shopping mall in Monroeville, Pennsylvania, United States

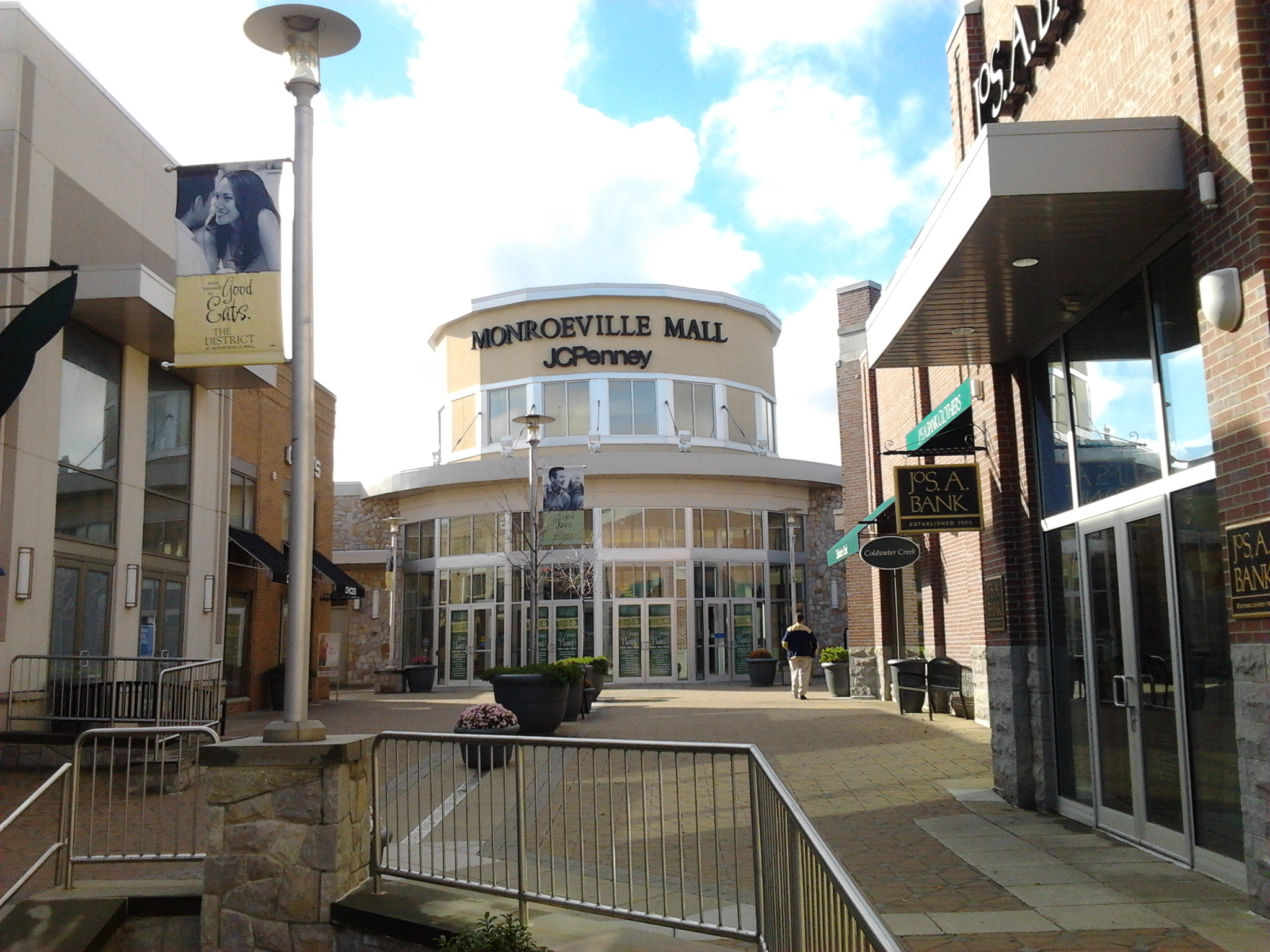
- An entrance to Monroeville Mall
- Location: 200 Mall Circle Drive; Monroeville, Pennsylvania
- Coordinates: 40°25′47.12″N 79°47′42.60″W
- Opened: May 13, 1969
- Developer: Oxford Development Company
- Owner: Walmart
- Num. of stores: 180
- Num. of anchor tenants: 9
- Floor area: 1,418,700 square feet (131,800 m^{2})
- Floors: 2 (3 in Macy's and 3rd floor staff floor in JCPenney)
- Parking: 6,800 spaces
- Public transit: Port Authority bus: 67, 68, P67, P68
- Website: monroevillemall.com

Monroeville Mall is a shopping mall that is located in the municipality of Monroeville, Pennsylvania, east of Pittsburgh, Pennsylvania, United States. It is situated on heavily traveled U.S. Route 22 Business (US 22 Bus.) near the junction of Interstate 376 (I-376) and the Monroeville interchange of the Pennsylvania Turnpike. The mall features JCPenney, Dick's Sporting Goods, and Macy's, in addition to a Cinemark Theatres. In January 2025, the mall was sold to Walmart, which intends to re-develop the property and demolish the mall.

Completed in 1969 by Oxford Development Company, the mall was extensively renovated and expanded between 2003 and 2004, and features the traditional retailers Barnes & Noble, Dick's Sporting Goods, JCPenney, and Macy's in addition to a Cinemark Theatres. At its opening, the owners claimed it was "the U.S.’s largest enclosed shopping center" with amenities like an ice-skating rink and a $125,000 clock tower that hosted puppet shows. It contains 1,418,700 square feet (131,800 m^{2}) of retail space on 170 acres (0.7 km^{2}), making it the largest shopping complex in Western Pennsylvania in terms of square footage. From 2004 to 2025, it was owned by Chattanooga, Tennessee based CBL & Associates Properties. It was one of two CBL-owned malls in the Pittsburgh area, the other being Westmoreland Mall in Greensburg.

Several major shopping centers, including the Miracle Mile Shopping Center, national retailers and restaurants can be found along the U.S. Route 22 commercial corridor, adjacent to the Monroeville Mall, creating the biggest such concentration of retailers and other commercial businesses in the eastern environs of the Pittsburgh Metropolitan Area. This mall is located on Mall Circle Drive, across from Monroeville Convention Center, venue of the Pittsburgh Comicon, a comic book convention, from 2009 to 2014.

== History and notable features ==
Before the 1950s postwar migration movement, Monroeville was predominantly a rural farming area. The opening of the Pennsylvania Turnpike in the early 1950s, followed by completion of Interstate 376 (Parkway East) in the early 1960s, spurred the growth of Monroeville and its eastern suburbs. In November 1954, the Miracle Mile Shopping Center opened for business with numerous shops and eateries. As shopping malls increased in popularity in the 1960s, residents of Monroeville and the eastern suburbs shopped at the now-defunct Eastland Mall in nearby North Versailles, or at Greengate Mall (now demolished and rebuilt as Greengate Centre) in Greensburg, Westmoreland County.

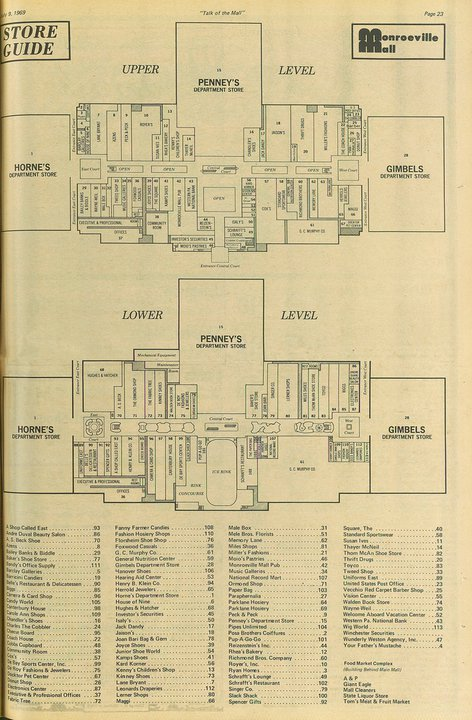
Original Layout of the Monroeville Mall in June 1969

=== Proposal ===
During the mid-1960s, Don-Mark Realty (later Oxford Development Company) proposed building the largest shopping mall in the United States, and acquired a 280-acre (1.1 km^{2}) tract of land known as Harper's Mine. Despite local residents questioning the suitability of the site, Don-Mark was confident that it was perfect. By 1966, grading equipment was used on the site in preparation for the mall's construction. More than 5,000,000 cubic yards (3,800,000 m^{3}) of dirt was moved to level the 110-acre (0.45 km^{2}) portion of the 280-acre (1.1 km^{2}) site, with excavation costs totaling $2.5 million at the time. Construction on the $30 million mall then began in 1967 and lasted for two years. Parking lots were then paved and spaced to accommodate 6,500 vehicles.

=== Opening ===
On Tuesday, May 13, 1969, the 1,130,000-square-foot (105,000 m^{2}) Monroeville Mall opened its doors with Gimbels and Joseph Horne Co. at opposite ends and JCPenney in the middle. The five and dime G. C. Murphy store provided a lower-price alternative for shoppers on the lower level. The mall contained 125 stores on two levels and featured the Ice Palace, a skating rink. Another unique feature was the location of a local Italian restaurant directly adjacent to the rink, with large picture windows in its dining rooms that gave patrons direct views of skaters on the rink. The mall's opening would contribute to the eventual decline and closure of the East Hills Shopping Center in nearby Penn Hills, a smaller outdoor mall also anchored by Horne's. It would also affect business at the nearby Miracle Mile Shopping Center, which was greatly impacted following the relocation of its JCPenney store to the Monroeville Mall, although business would gradually level out over time.

=== Mall amenities ===
The mall was decorated with fountains and plant life that flourished under enormous skylights. The Gimbels court of the mall featured a large yellow clock tower that housed 12 animated puppets, each one representing an ethnic group in the Pittsburgh area. One puppet performed every hour, and all performed together at 1pm and 6pm. The court at the Horne's end of the mall had a large, circular fountain, surrounded by a seating area. The store selection in the mall ranged from high fashion to hardware. There was a bank, several places to eat, pharmacies, pubs and even a ministry center, as developers had intended on making the mall into an indoor "town center" for the Monroeville community.

=== Surrounding developments and in-mall projects ===
With Monroeville Mall fully operational, the areas surrounding the mall began to develop as well. Outparcels such as a movie theater, a Marriott hotel, a freestanding Montgomery Ward store, and a number of retailers, auto service centers and restaurants were subsequently built during the 1970s. The mall annex would also be developed directly behind the mall and feature an A&P supermarket, among other businesses. The A&P closed in 1992, and was replaced by a Burlington Coat Factory in 1993, Dick's Sporting Goods in 1995, OfficeMax in 1998, and LensCrafters eye shop in the fall of 1987. The Greater Pittsburgh Merchandise Mart, the predecessor to the much larger Pittsburgh ExpoMart of Monroeville, was developed as a facility for the display of goods by representatives of various manufacturers. It would be replaced by the larger facility in 1981 and redeveloped for the now defunct Borders bookstore which opened in January 1993. In February 1984, much to the dismay of local residents, the Ice Palace was replaced by a food court. In later years, most of the mall's decorative ponds and bridges would be replaced by numerous carts and kiosks. In the early 1990s, the distinctive clock tower was dismantled in lieu of a stage, which has since been removed, while the fountain at the opposite end was removed in the early 2000s for a children's play area, themed to Mister Rogers' Neighborhood. In 2009, the ExpoMart was converted into office space and a smaller convention center opened along Mall Boulevard in a renovated former Wickes Furniture store.

=== Renovation and expansion ===
The largest renovation and expansion project ever at Monroeville Mall was completed in 2003–2004, when CBL & Associates Properties purchased it. The main entrance area fronting the mall was redeveloped into an 80,000-square-foot (7,400 m^{2}) lifestyle center called The District. Inside the mall, extensive upgrades to the mall's entrances, restrooms and common areas were completed, with new escalators, lighting fixtures, railings, flooring and seating among the new amenities. The food court was also extensively renovated, complete with new tables and seating. Likewise, the fountain near the elevator was removed to maximize seating area for the food court and the glass elevator itself refurbished. In 2012–2013, even more changes were afoot as a new wing, anchored by a 12-screen Cinemark Theatres and additional in-line shops had been constructed.

On February 7, 2015, a juvenile later identified as 17-year-old Tarod Thornhill entered the men's department on the lower level of Macy's department store about 7:30 p.m. and shot his intended target and two bystanders, leaving two with critical injuries. Victims were sent to nearby Forbes Hospital. Among the witnesses were NFL Wide Receiver Terrelle Pryor, who tweeted about the incident afterward. As a result of this incident, the mall has instituted a youth escort policy which requires all youths 18 and under to be escorted by a parent or guardian 21+ on Fridays and Saturdays from 6 p.m. to close. Mall management, Monroeville police, and Allegheny County have pledged to work together to secure the future of the mall and the community by implementing further security measures, which "will include — but not be limited to — increased installation of security cameras and video surveillance." Despite the negative attention the mall has received, municipal leaders continue to state that "Monroeville Mall is a very safe, family-oriented" mall.

On March 5, 2015, CBL & Associates Properties officials announced their continued commitment to Monroeville Mall with a multimillion-dollar renovation project slated to begin later that month. Renovations included a minimal overhaul of the mall's interior, including a new color scheme of muted tones of blue, gray and brown. The existing lighting was removed, and new contemporary sconces were used to brighten the common areas. Sleek stainless steel railings were upgraded to line the walkways. In addition seating areas were added designed for relaxing and chatting. The restrooms were upgraded with granite and cherry wood finishes. New furniture and finishes in the Food Court reflected the overall contemporary new design. The mall's exterior was also enhanced with new benches and receptacles.

=== Sale to Walmart and redevelopment ===
On January 31, 2025, CBL & Associates Properties announced that it had sold the mall for $34 million, with no buyer named. Following the announcement, Dallas-based Cypress Equities announced that they would be developing the property for the anonymous buyer. On February 6, it was revealed that the new owner of the mall was Walmart. Walmart spokesperson Mark Rickel stated at that time that it was too early to reveal any future plans for the property. Later, mall tenants reported being told the mall would be demolished for mixed-use development. A Pennsylvania Redevelopment Assistance Capital Program proposal for $7.5M was submitted during the 2025 funding round for a project named 'Monroeville Mall Gateway'. The project description stated the existing mall structures will be demolished.

In June 2026, fans of George A. Romero's Dawn of the Dead, which was filmed at the mall, attended Living Dead Weekend hosted at the mall. According to the organizer of the weekend, "an estimated 3,000 “Dawn of the Dead” aficionados with more than 60 cast and crew members" attended. The organizer plans to have a final event in October before the mall is shuttered.

== In popular culture ==
The Monroeville Mall has been used as a location in films and other media forms.

=== In film ===
- The Monroeville Mall was the filming location for the 1978 zombie movie Dawn of the Dead, directed by George A. Romero. The mall now has a Living Dead Museum which “is a celebration of Zombies in Pop-Culture” [sic].
- The ice skating rink at the Monroeville Mall appears in the 1983 film Flashdance as the rink on which Jeanne auditions.
- Some scenes from the 2008 film Zack and Miri Make a Porno, directed by Kevin Smith, were filmed in the mall.
- In the 1984 children's fantasy film The Boy Who Loved Trolls, 12-year-old Paul is seen wandering through the halls of the mall as shots of many long-gone storefronts such as the Candy Tree are shown.

=== In television shows ===
- In Episode 1483 of Mister Rogers' Neighborhood, Chef Brockett participated in a cake decorating contest that was filmed in the location of the old fountain court at the Monroeville Mall.
- In Season 2, Episode 5 of the Netflix series Mindhunter, one of the entrances at the Monroeville Mall was used as an entrance of the San Francisco International Airport.
- During the 2021 WWE Pay per view WrestleMania Backlash during the zombie lumberjack match, Monroeville native Corey Graves, said that, "he had flashbacks to the Monroeville Mall," a direct reference to the mall being the filming location of Dawn of the Dead.

=== In literature ===
- Stephen King's 1983 novel Christine takes place in the fictional suburb of Libertyville, Pennsylvania, which is adjacent to Monroeville. The Monroeville Mall is mentioned repeatedly.
- Holly Gibney confronts the antagonist of Stephen King’s 2020 novella "If It Bleeds" in the Monroeville Mall food court.

=== In music ===
- The song "Early Sunsets over Monroeville" by My Chemical Romance, from their debut album I Brought You My Bullets, You Brought Me Your Love, invokes the Monroeville Mall; vocalist Gerard Way describes it as "a sweet song about Dawn of the Dead."

== Anchor stores ==
The Monroeville Mall's original anchor tenants at its opening in May 1969 were the Pittsburgh-based Joseph Horne Company, Gimbels, and JCPenney (then Penney's). A freestanding Montgomery Ward store would also arrive in the 1970s; however, it would close by the mid-1980s as part of a restructuring plan at the time.

In 1970, the entire Gimbels chain was purchased by the tobacco conglomerate BATUS. In 1986, after years of declining sales, BATUS announced that Gimbels was on the block. Unable to find a buyer for the entire chain, BATUS closed down the entire Gimbels Pittsburgh division, selling or closing all locations. Some of the more attractive mall locations, such as the Monroeville Mall, were taken over by the St. Louis-based May Department Stores Company for its Pittsburgh-based Kaufmann's division. This effectively caused the shuttering of the entire Gimbels Pittsburgh division. The Monroeville Mall location was closed, completely renovated and expanded into the building's unused third floor, before reopening as Kaufmann's. In 2006, when the May Department Stores Company was purchased by Cincinnati-based Federated Department Stores, this store was acquired by Boscov's, as Macy's was already located in the former Horne's location at the opposite end of the mall. In October 2008, Boscov's closed their Monroeville store as part of a bankruptcy plan.

The Joseph Horne Company, owned by the New York City-based Associated Dry Goods Corporation, operated in Monroeville Mall until 1994. It would be renovated and expanded, utilizing the store's unused third floor, over the course of its operation through the years. In October 1986, the May Department Stores Company merged with Associated Dry Goods. May promptly sold the Horne's chain to a group of local investors. In 1995, Federated Department Stores acquired Horne's and renamed all former locations under its own Lazarus regional nameplate. In 2005, Federated eventually merged all its divisions (including the former Joseph Horne/Lazarus locations) into Macy's as part of a nationwide rebranding program. In 2016, Macy's Backstage opened on the store's lower level.

JCPenney was the last original anchor at the Monroeville Mall. From 1969 to 2012, it operated its original store in the center of the mall; however, by late 2012 it opened an updated format on the two upper levels of the former Boscov's building, and the original store was razed to make way for the 12-screen Cinemark Theatres and in-line shops, which opened in the fall of 2013. H&M has also committed to a new location at Monroeville Mall; it opened in the summer of 2013 near the theater. Dick's Sporting Goods relocated from outside the mall into a new store format below JCPenney in the summer of 2014.
