= East Hills Shopping Center (Pennsylvania) =

- Location: Pittsburgh, Pennsylvania, United States
- Coordinates: 40.46000°N 79.86770°W
- Address: Robinson Blvd. at Frankstown Road
- Opened: 1960; 66 years ago
- Closed: 1980 (shopping center; some tenants remained in operation afterward)
- Developer: Mellon-Stuart
- Num. of stores: 60
- Num. of anchor tenants: 3
- Floor area: 600,000 square feet (56,000 m^{2})
- Floors: 1

East Hills Shopping Center was an outdoor shopping mall in Pittsburgh, Pennsylvania. Opened in 1960, the center lost most of its major stores in the late 1970s and underwent several failed attempts at renovation.

== History ==
East Hills opened in 1960 under the development of Mellon-Stuart, a local engineering firm. It was built as an outdoor mall with Joseph Horne Company (Horne's) as the main department store. Other major tenants included G. C. Murphy, Kresge, and a Thorofare supermarket. A year after the mall's opening, Horne's added a second store at the mall which specialized in discounted clothing.

The mall was largely vacated in the late 1970s, having lost most of its business to Monroeville Mall, a larger mall that also featured a Horne's. In 1979, Horne's closed its East Hills store, as did G. C. Murphy, Kresge, and Thorofare. The president of East Hills' merchants' association said in 1980 that East Hills' design was "outmoded" and not suitable for colder weather, since unlike Monroeville, East Hills' concourses were not enclosed. In 1981, a local developer purchased the property with plans to convert it to a factory outlet mall. Golden Dawn Supermarket opened in the former Thorofare in 1980, which closed five years later and became Giant Eagle.

In 1987, the complex was renamed Eastgate Commerce Center, and was rezoned to allow for light industrial use. Besides a Zayre discount store on an outparcel, the center remained largely vacant. Both Zayre and Giant Eagle closed in 1989. Eastgate Associates bought the property in 1991. The company planned to renovate the mall, which had only seven tenants at that point, for light industrial use. This redevelopment was unsuccessful. By 1998, only 15 percent of the space had been reused.

In 1999, Petra Ministries bought the former Zayre store behind the mall and converted it to a church. They continued to own the mall property through January 2013, at which point it was put up for sale. Between 1999 and 2007, Petra had attempted to get Walmart to build a store on the site. The mall was demolished in 2001. Lowe's and Kmart were also proposed as replacements for the mall, but as of 2013, the site remained vacant. U-Pull-And-Pay auto salvage opened on the site in 2017.
