= Oxford Development =

Real estate firm based in Pittsburgh, Pennsylvania

Oxford Development Company
- Company type: Private
- Industry: Real estate
- Founded: 1963
- Founder: Edward J. Lewis
- Headquarters: Pittsburgh, Pennsylvania, United States
- Key people: Steven J. Guy, President, CEO
- Website: oxforddevelopment.com

Oxford Development Company is an American real estate firm based in Pittsburgh, Pennsylvania, providing real estate development, property management, brokerage services, investment advisory services, and business operations. In 2021, it was listed as the largest commercial property manager in the Pittsburgh metropolitan area with 13,177,043 sq ft (1,224,187.4 m^{2}) of leasable space. Likewise, it is one of the largest real estate firms in Pennsylvania.

== Projects ==
In the 1980s, Oxford developed One Oxford Centre, a 45-story tower on Grant Street in downtown Pittsburgh.

In 2014, the company announced its plans of developing another legacy project, which would be a 20-story tower located in Smithfield Street in downtown Pittsburgh. Oxford abandoned plans for the tower in 2017 after failing to find an anchor tenant.

At the same time, Oxford developed 200 acres in Pittsburgh's Strip District to create their 3 Crossings project. The first phase of the project is currently leased up in what is becoming known as "Robotics Row" or "The Silicon Strip", featuring tenants such as autonomous driving company Argo AI, Burns White, Bosch, Target, Apple, and Smith and Nephew. Additionally, Pittsburgh-based health and nutrition related products company GNC has announced the relocation of their headquarters to 3 Crossings. In October 2019, Oxford moved their headquarters to the 3 Crossings project as well, taking space in Riverfront West.

As of 2018, Oxford began managing multifamily residential properties, by self-managing three of their own properties: The Yards at 3 Crossings, Coda on Centre, and The Racquet Club Apartments, as well as management of a new residential building by Steel Street Capital, Helm on the Allegheny.

== Subsidiaries ==
Subsidiaries of the company include:

- Oxford Real Estate Advisers (OREA)
- Oxford Realty Services
