= Southern Highlands Golf Club =

Private club in the Las Vegas Valley

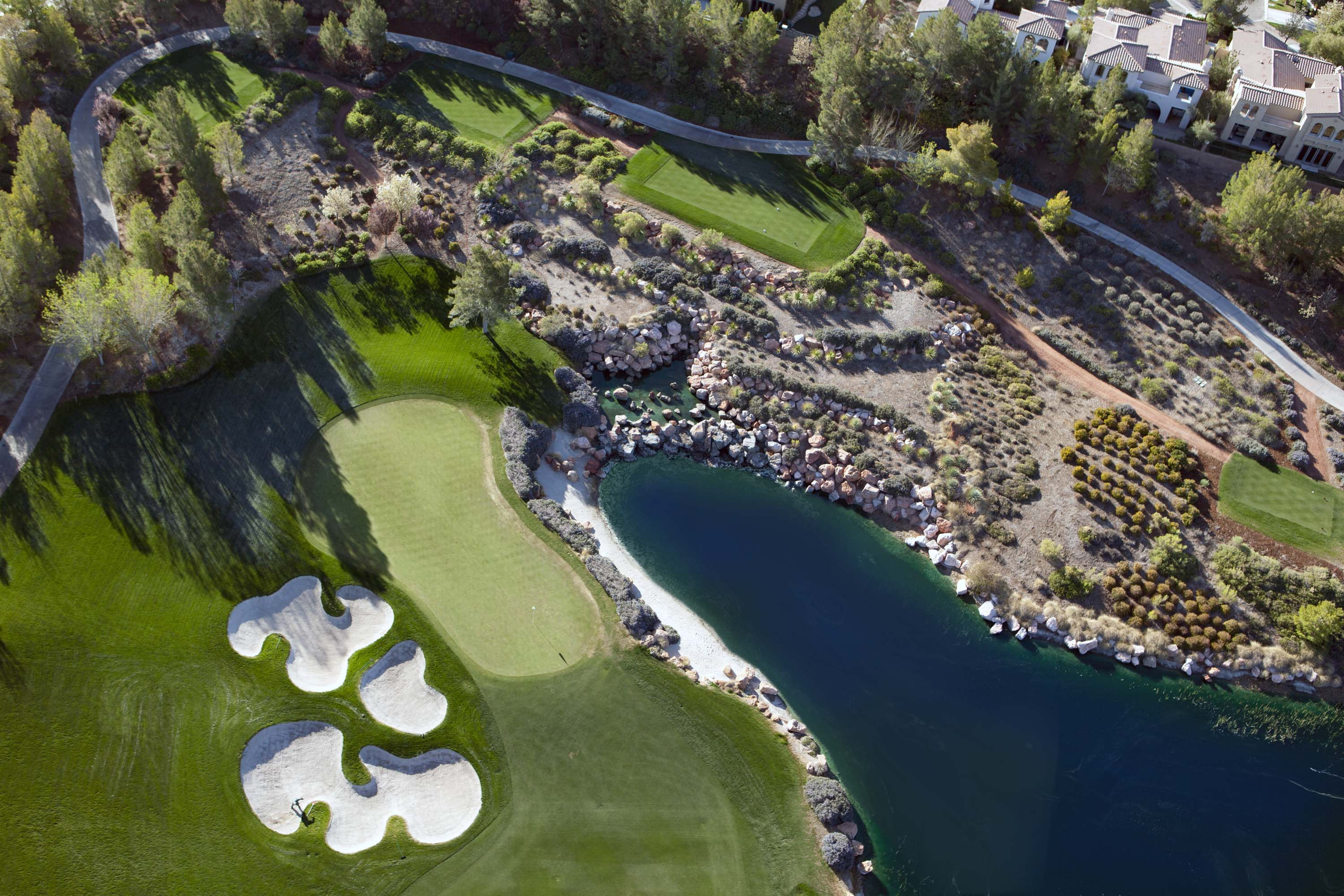

- Location within Nevada
- 35°58′20.41″N 115°11′35.34″W

Club information
- Location: Enterprise, Nevada in the Las Vegas Valley
- Established: 2000
- Type: Private
- Total holes: 18
- Designed by: Robert Trent Jones Sr./ Robert Trent Jones Jr.

Southern Highlands Golf Club is a private club with a championship 18-hole golf course and a highly affluent neighborhood located in the Southern Highlands community of the Las Vegas Valley. The golf course was co-designed by Robert Trent Jones and his son Robert Trent Jones, Jr.

It was the elder Jones' final work and one of four courses they designed together. It is among the most exclusive residential country clubs in the state of Nevada. Membership to the club is by invitation-only, with a restricted roster of 360 total members.

== Neighborhood ==
The Southern Highlands Golf Club is situated in the southwest foothills of Greater Las Vegas and is one of the highest points of the Las Vegas area. All of the homes are guard-gated, and many are strategically placed behind lush landscaping to avoid being seen from street level. The Golf Club consists of a single 24-hour guard-gated community with private roads that are accessible only through the three entry gates, and is notable for its extensive greenery with over 17,000 trees.

As one of the wealthiest neighborhoods in the United States, Southern Highlands Golf Club is home to multiple gaming executives, real estate developers, professional athletes, musicians, actors and actresses, corporate executives, philanthropists, and politicians. The neighborhood has one of the highest average home prices in the country, at $4,993,950. A smaller neighborhood within the Golf Club, The Estates at Southern Highlands, is known for its large mansions and private drives that frequently exceed eight figures.

== Events ==
- The country club hosts the annual Governor's Black Tie Invitational, which takes place at the country club and Spa Southern Highlands, a private resort spa within the community, over a single weekend and raises over $2 million each year for local charities through member donations. To date, the Invitational has raised more than $32 million.

== Awards ==
- The course was named "One of the Top Residential Golf Courses in the United States" by Golf Digest magazine, and has hosted two PGA Tour events.
- Named the Nevada Chapter Course of the Year by the National Golf Course Owners Association (NGCOA).
- The course was ranked #41 on Golfweek's Best Residential Courses 2014.
- Included in Travel + Leisure Golf's annual best places to live, and was also included in the list of "America's Top 100 Golf Communities".
- Ranked 27th in the Top 50 Private Golf Courses by GolfWorld Reader's Choice Awards.
- Ranked 34th in Golf Digest Index for best modern-day golf courses in the nation.
- Ranked among the top 15 best golf communities in the nation by Golfweek.
- Ranked the #1 clubhouse in the nation by Golf Digest Index in 2015.
