= Southern Highlands =

Southern Highlands may refer to:

- Southern Highlands (New South Wales), Australia, a small geographical and wine region located between Sydney and Canberra
- Southern Highlands Province, Papua New Guinea
- Southern Highlands, Nevada, a community in the Las Vegas Valley, Nevada, United States
- Southern Highlands, Appalachian Mountains, southeast United States
- Southern Highlands, Tanzania, Africa, a region of rich biodiversity in south-western Tanzania
- The Southern Highlands of Mars, part of Mars' planetary-scale hemispheric dichotomy
