= Tuscany Suites and Casino =

Casino hotel in Nevada, United States

Coordinates: 36.1133°N 115.1600°W

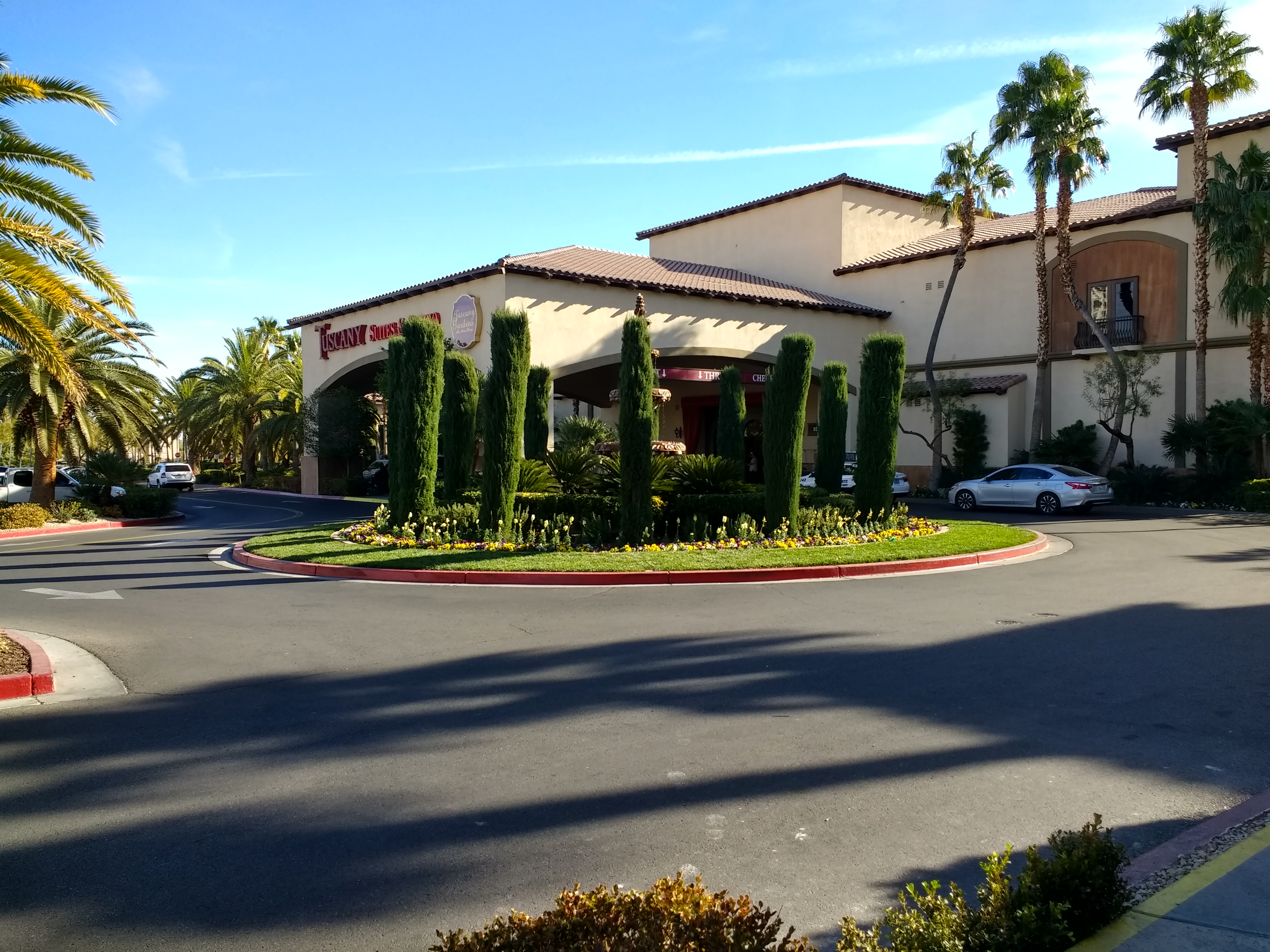
- Interactive map of Tuscany Suites and Casino
- Location: Paradise, Nevada; 255 East Flamingo Road
- Opened: December 2001 (hotel); January 17, 2003 (casino)
- Theme: Tuscany
- No. of rooms: 716
- Gaming space: 24,665 sq ft (2,291.5 m^{2})
- Permanent shows: Rich Little Live! The Rat Pack is Back
- Signature attractions: Copa Room; Piazza Lounge
- Casino type: Land-based
- Owner: Brett Heers
- Renovated in: 2015–2017, 2023
- Website: tuscanylv.com

Tuscany Suites and Casino is located east of the Las Vegas Strip in Paradise, Nevada. The project was conceived by Las Vegas developer Charles Heers, and is owned by his son Brett Heers. The all-suite hotel opened in December 2001, with 716 rooms. The casino, which includes 24,665 sq ft (2,291.5 m^{2}) of gaming space, opened on January 17, 2003.

== History ==
The Tuscany was conceived by Las Vegas developer Charles Heers, whose family also owned the Vacation Village hotel and casino. The Tuscany is located on Flamingo Road, east of the Las Vegas Strip. In 1988, Heers purchased 17.5 acres (7.1 ha) of the land from the Howard Hughes estate, and later purchased an additional 10 acres (4.0 ha).

The casino had a soft opening on January 17, 2003. An official grand opening was planned within two months, after the completion of convention space.

The Tuscany cost $100 million to build, and was owned by Heers and business partner Gaylord Yost, an Arizona contractor. They hoped to attract both tourists and local residents, including resort employees from the Las Vegas Strip. The casino was expected to boost the hotel's occupancy.

Brett Heers, the son of Charles, took over operations in 2009, as his father's health was in decline. Charles Heers held 95-percent ownership, while his son held the remainder. Charles died 12 years later, at the age of 94, leaving his son as the owner of the Tuscany.

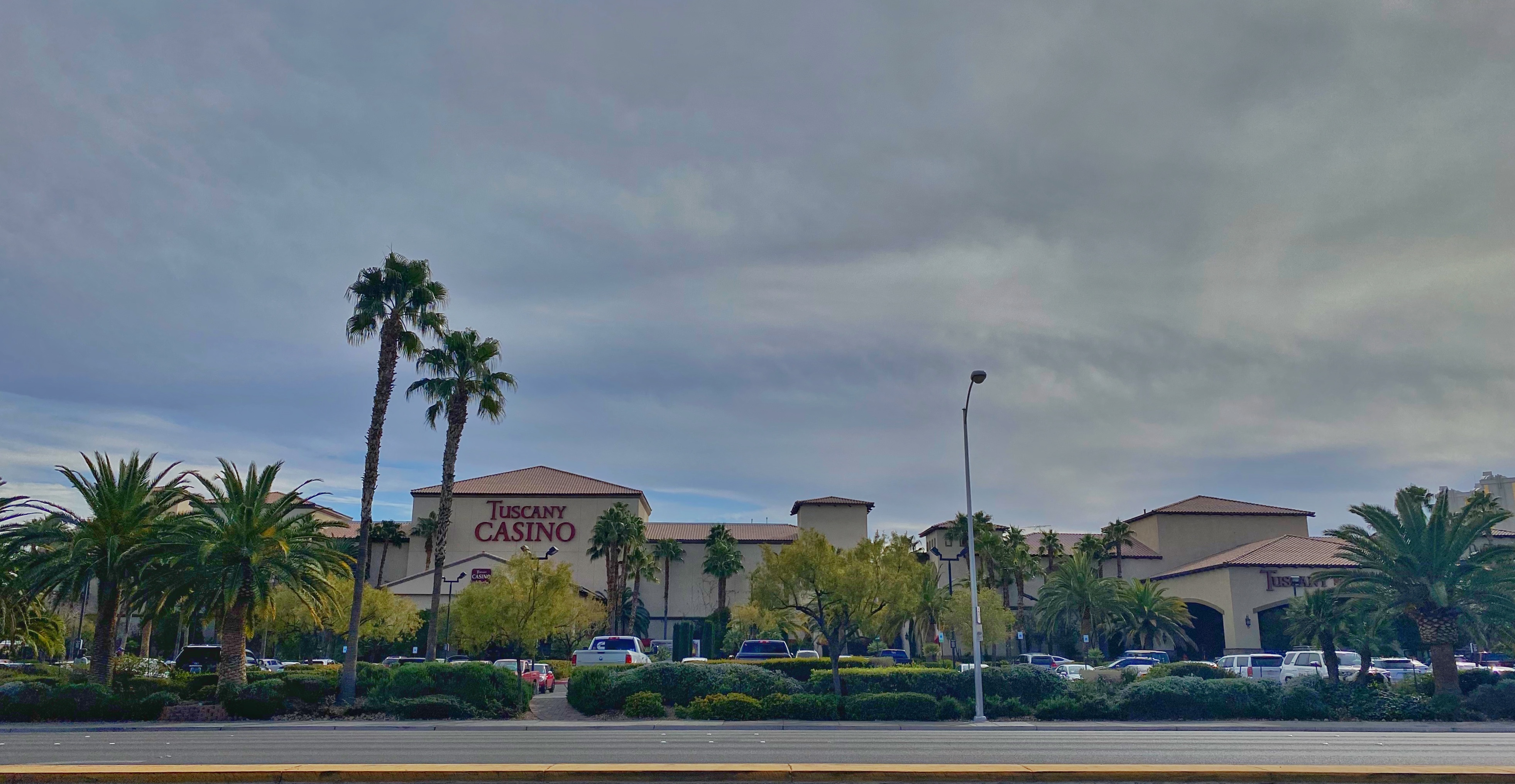
Tuscany Suites, as seen from Flamingo Road in 2020

A renovation of the hotel rooms took place from 2015 to 2017, costing $5 million. In 2020, the Tuscany entered a deal with Circa Sports, which began operating the casino's sportsbook the following year.

The Tuscany is located near the track for the Las Vegas Grand Prix, an annual racing event that began in 2023. The Tuscany signed a five-year deal to serve as the host hotel for catering and media officials affiliated with the race. In conjunction with this, the property launched a renovation that included new paint, carpeting, and elevators.

== Features ==
The Tuscany has 716 suites, and a casino with 24,665 sq ft (2,291.5 m^{2}) of gaming space.

The Tuscany is popular among locals and convention-goers, in part for its restaurants. Palazzo Ristorante opened in 2002, followed a year later by Marilyn's, named after Heers' wife. A food court was also added in 2003, along with convention space on the casino building's second floor. Pub 365, which serves food and 365 types of beer, was added in 2016. The property also featured an Italian steakhouse known as Tuscany Gardens, which was renovated and renamed as Bistecca in 2024.

The Tuscany is also popular for its live entertainment. The Piazza Lounge opened in 2003, featuring free performances nightly. The property also includes the Copa Room, which is home to paid entertainment. Originally called the T Spot Lounge, it was renamed in honor of the Copa Room, a Strip venue where the Rat Pack had performed. A tribute show, The Rat Pack Is Back, opened at the Tuscany's Copa Room in 2015, coinciding with the venue's name change, and has continued since then. Jew Man Group, featuring a trio of comedians, was also performed at the Tuscany.

In September 2025, impressionist Rich Little began a residency at the Copa Room.
