= Tivoli Village =

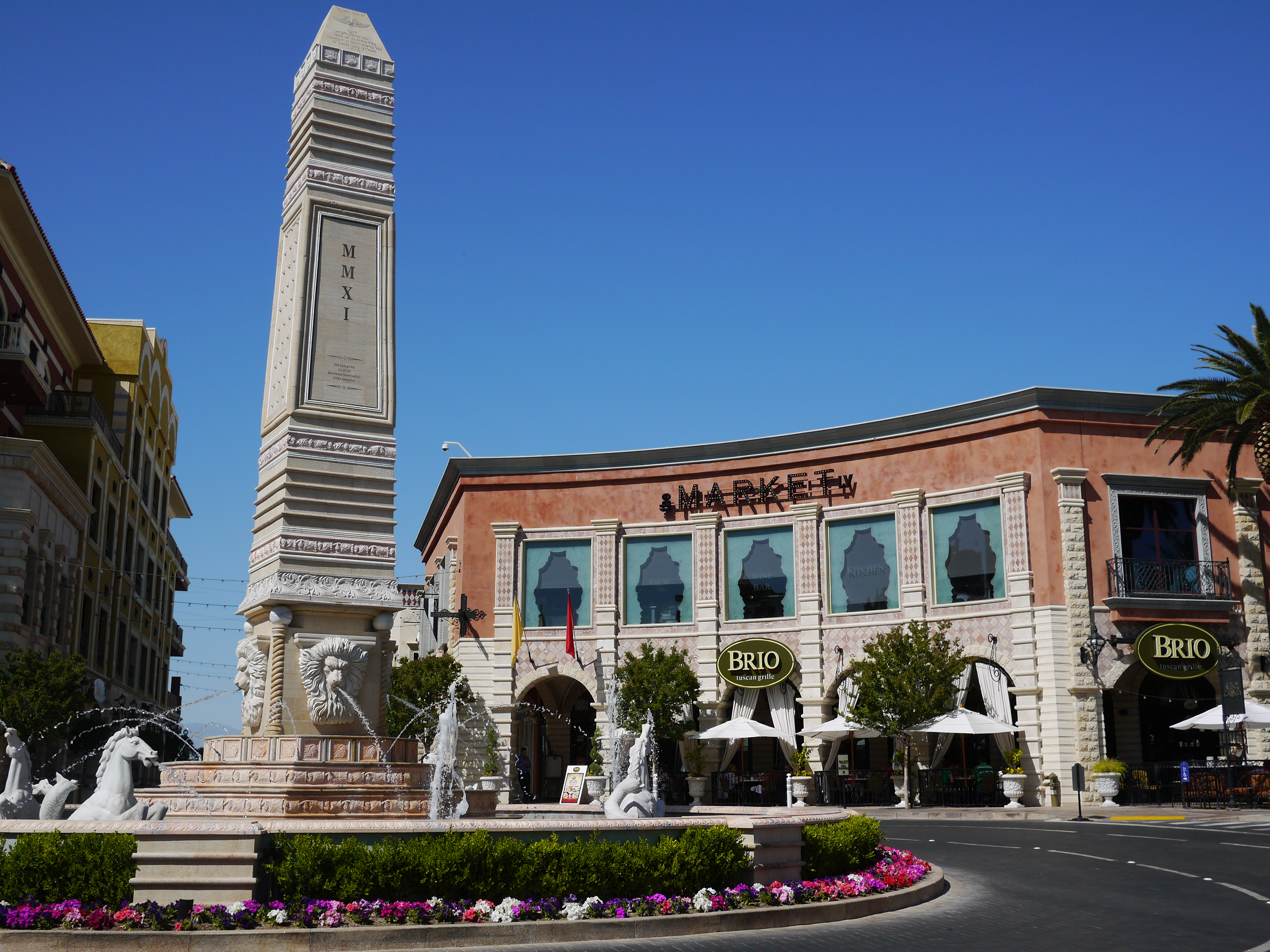
- Tivoli Village in 2013

Project
- Opening date: April 28, 2011
- Developer: Executive Home Builders; IDB Development Corporation
- Owner: 3D Investments
- Website: www.tivolivillagelv.com

Location
- Interactive map of Tivoli Village
- Coordinates: 36.167461°N 115.286226°W
- Location: Las Vegas, Nevada
- Address: 410 South Rampart Boulevard

Tivoli Village is a mixed-use development center consisting of retail and office space, located on 28.43 acres (11.51 ha) at 410 South Rampart Boulevard in Las Vegas, Nevada, next to the Summerlin community. It is owned by 3D Investments.

The project was announced in May 2005, as The Village at Queensridge. Work began on the project in 2006, but its opening was delayed numerous times because of poor economic conditions, which prompted the decision to develop the property in phases. The first phase opened on April 28, 2011.

Work on a second phase had begun by May 2010, with an opening initially planned for 2012, although this was delayed several times. It eventually opened on October 28, 2016. Additional phases have been considered since 2010, with possible amenities including condominiums and a small hotel.

== History ==
The project was initially announced on May 24, 2005, as The Village at Queensridge, a $500 million mixed-use project to be developed by Peccole Nevada Corporation and the Las Vegas-based Executive Home Builders (EHB). The project would be developed near the Las Vegas community of Summerlin on 30 acres (12 ha) of land, at the northeast corner of Rampart Boulevard and Alta Drive, near the Suncoast Hotel and Casino, the Angel Park golf course, and the developers' One Queensridge Place high-rise condominium project.

The project would feature 700,000 sq ft (65,000 m^{2}) of boutique retail stores, movie theaters, restaurants, and executive office space. Restaurant space would take up 125,000 sq ft (11,600 m^{2}) of the project. The property would also include two five-story condominium towers and a 10-story tower with a total of 340 units, priced from the $600,000 range to over $1 million. The condominium towers were expected to begin construction within 90 days, with a projected opening in 2007. Frank Pankratz, president of Executive Home Builders, wanted the project to portray the elegance and quality of the company's other projects throughout the Las Vegas Valley: "We're big into stonework and granite. You can see the fit and finishes here are the same as what we'll be incorporating into our tower, One Queensridge Place."

The project would be accessible from Rampart Boulevard and from Alta Drive, and would include an underground 1,400,000 sq ft (130,000 m^{2}) parking garage with 3,500 parking spaces, to be built in what was once a wash, which created difficult topography for the project that required the excavation of 1.1 million cubic yards of dirt to accommodate the garage. A 12-foot-by-25-foot culvert was to be added underground to divert floodwater from the property. The garage would contain a series of elevators and escalators to help patrons easily navigate the property. In November 2005, IDB Development Corporation joined the project as an investment partner. Because of rising construction costs and design changes of the condominium towers, the project's cost increased to an estimated $750 million in 2006, when grading and infrastructure work began. The culvert cost $5 million, and was nearly complete in September 2006, as the property was being prepared for the next phase of work.

Construction was underway as of August 2007. The project was to include 18 buildings, some as high as 10 stories. As of April 2008, the underground parking garage was under construction, and a foundation had been completed for one of the 18 buildings. The garage required a 35-foot mass excavation, at a cost of $5 million. More than a year was spent constructing the garage. Australian company Village Roadshow planned to build the movie theater, which would feature eight screens at a total of 36,000 sq ft (3,300 m^{2}). Approximately 170 construction workers were on the property daily; the number was expected to increase to over 1,000 workers during the project's busiest construction period. The project, at that time, was expected to cost $850 million, and was scheduled to open in spring 2009.

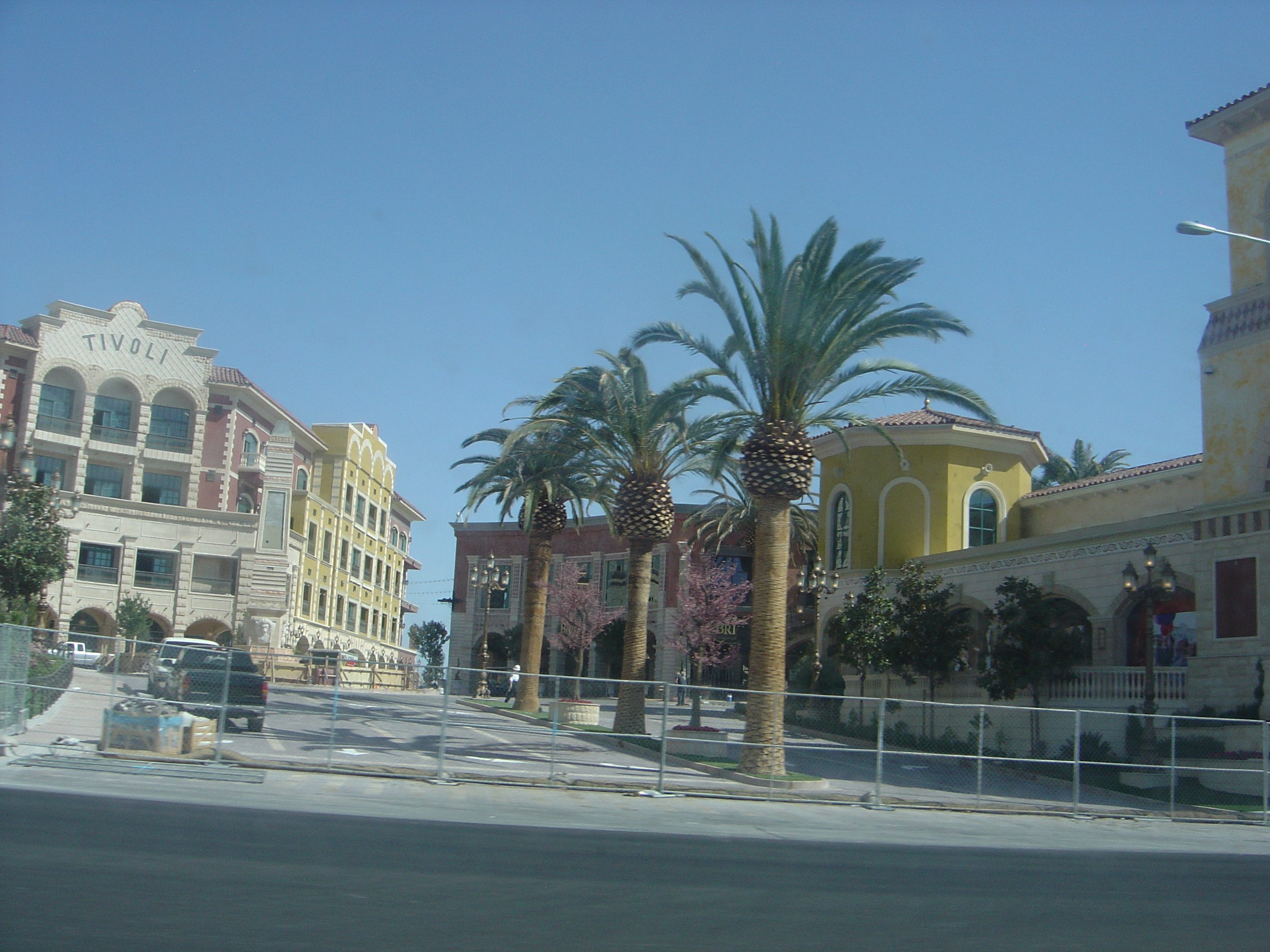
Tivoli Village during construction, April 2011

By May 2008, the project had been renamed as Tivoli Village at Queensridge, and the opening was subsequently pushed back to fall 2009. Approximately 70 percent of the project's space had been leased or was in the process of being leased to tenants. In September 2008, the developers announced that construction would continue despite a declining economy, with the project on track for a 2009 opening. However, in December 2008, Tivoli Village's developers and tenants reached a consensus that the project's opening be delayed to spring 2010, due to poor economic conditions, although construction was to continue at a slower pace. During the 2008 recession, the developers chose to construct Tivoli Village in phases. with an opening expected in fall 2010.

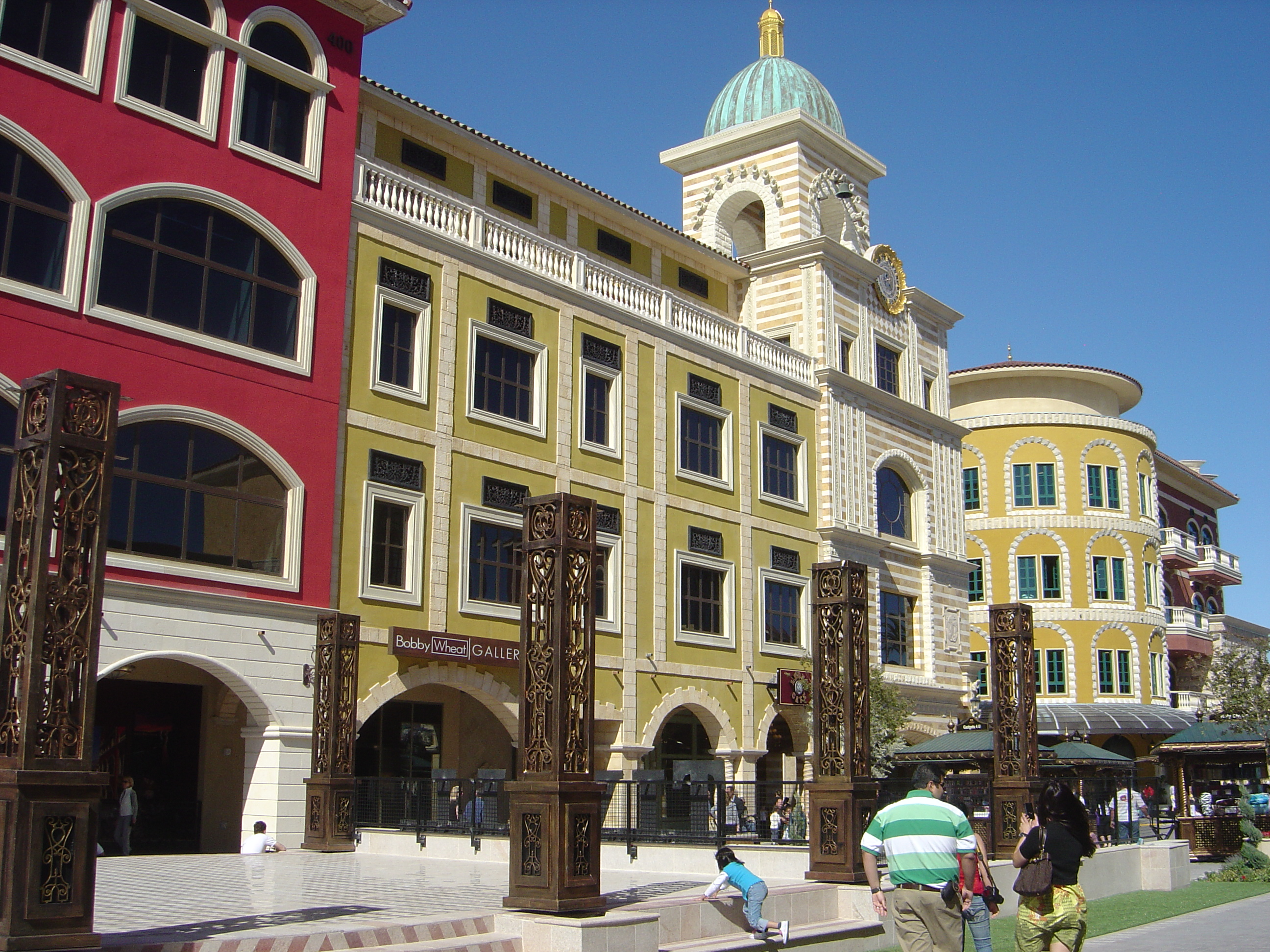
Buildings at Tivoli Village

Full-scale construction resumed in November 2009, with a planned opening about 13 months later. The first phase of Tivoli Village was initially set to include 200,000 sq ft (19,000 m^{2}) of office space and 500,000 sq ft (46,000 m^{2}) for retail, entertainment, and restaurants; this number was reduced to 140,000 sq ft (13,000 m^{2}) and 230,000 sq ft (21,000 m^{2}) respectively, for a total of 370,000 sq ft (34,000 m^{2}).

In May 2010, Tivoli Village planned to open its first phase in March 2011, with 40 to 50 retailers and approximately eight restaurants, including a pizzeria by actor Joe Pesci. It was also announced that the project's 340 condominium units had been placed on indefinite hold. Later in 2010, a local law firm signed on as the project's first office tenant, followed by Merrill Lynch. In March 2011, the project's soft opening was delayed to April 28, 2011, while a grand opening was planned for September. Only a limited number of retailers and restaurants were expected during the soft opening; while the building exteriors were nearly finished, the interiors were not.

Tivoli Village opened on April 28, 2011, with 15 retailers and three restaurants, only about half of the first phase's retailers. Tivoli Village was expected to ultimately include 30 or 40 retail stores, after the completion of its first phase in the winter. Leases had been finalized for 72 percent of the property's retail space and 55 percent of its office space. Tivoli Village was built at a cost of $700 million, and was the first new, large-scale retail project to open in Las Vegas since Town Square in 2007. With Tivoli Village, the developers wanted to create a "city within a city." The project was designed by JMA Architecture Studios and Development Design Group. Tivoli Village was designed to resemble a 1400s European village, and was named after Italy's Tivoli Fountains. The project contained 225,000 sq ft (20,900 m^{2}) of retail space and 145,000 sq ft (13,500 m^{2}) of office space. The project's condo units were still in consideration at that time.

=== Second phase ===
In May 2010, it was announced that work had begun on the project's second phase, which would bring the project's total square-footage to 700,000 upon its completion in late 2012, although this was later delayed by a year. The second phase initially was to include 300,000 sq ft (28,000 m^{2}) of entertainment and retail space, as well as a movie theater.

Construction ultimately began in October 2013, with a projected opening in spring 2015. The second phase would include an underground garage and would add 270,000 sq ft (25,000 m^{2}), with 200,000 sq ft (19,000 m^{2}) consisting of retailers and restaurants and the remainder consisting of office space. By November 2014, the second phase's cost had increased by approximately $200 million, to more than $500 million, with an expected opening in winter 2015 or spring 2016.

By January 2015, Executive Home Builders was no longer a part of the project's future development. IDB had also relinquished half of Tivoli's financing because of major investment losses. Phase two continued construction, although its opening was delayed again. In August 2016, a construction worker died from a fall after a scaffolding collapsed. Construction was halted to allow for a safety investigation to take place.

After years of sporadic construction due to unexpected economic circumstances, the second phase opened on October 28, 2016, with approximately 350,000 sq ft (33,000 m^{2}). The second phase included a new entrance on Rampart Boulevard and an additional 1,000 parking spaces in the underground garage. The second phase's anchor store was Restoration Hardware, which opened RH Las Vegas-The Gallery at Tivoli Village, located in a 60,000 sq ft (5,600 m^{2}), four-level building. It was the largest gallery built by Restoration Hardware up to that point.

=== Planned expansions and sale ===
In December 2010, plans were announced for a third and fourth phase. The third phase would add approximately 300,000 sq ft (28,000 m^{2}) of retail and office space. The fourth phase would consist of 342 condominium units located in three buildings. Neither phase has begun construction.

In subsequent years, the plans for a third phase were altered to include condominiums and a boutique hotel. With a third phase, Tivoli Village was expected to extend to its northern border with Angel Park Golf Course. As of October 2016, the third phase was expected to occur in subsequent years, on property north of the Restoration Hardware store.

In early 2022, Tivoli Village was sold for $216 million to 3D Investments, a California-based real estate firm. The company plans to eventually develop the property's northern edge.

== Apartments ==
Elysian at Tivoli is an apartment complex across from Tivoli Village. Originally, the site was intended for an indoor shopping mall that was also being planned by EHB and IBD. In October 2010, the companies paid $11.75 million for the 23-acre site, located directly south of Tivoli Village, separated by Alta Drive. The developers announced plans in April 2011 for Las Vegas Renaissance, to be built on the land. The project would include a 750,000 sq ft (70,000 m^{2}) indoor shopping mall as well as 100 condominium-type units. The mall would include 50 stores and would connect to Tivoli Village through a pedestrian bridge that would extend over Alta Drive. The project was expected to open in 2015. Las Vegas Renaissance would blend with the Italian aesthetic of Tivoli Village, and would be inspired by the Galleria Vittorio Emanuele II mall in Italy. By November 2014, construction had yet to begin on the project due to legal issues with the former land owners. Following EHB's exit from the Tivoli Village project, the plans for Las Vegas Renaissance were also cancelled.

In 2017, plans were approved by a separate company, The Calida Group, to build apartments on the property previously intended for Las Vegas Renaissance. The start of construction was delayed due to the slow process of receiving project permits. Groundbreaking on the apartments, Elysian at Tivoli, began around June 2019. The 359-unit complex occupies 15.6 acres. The project opened in May 2021.

3D Investments sold eight acres of property – adjacent to Tivoli Village – to Calida in 2022. The company intends to use the land for a second apartment complex, with construction beginning in 2023.

== Gallery ==
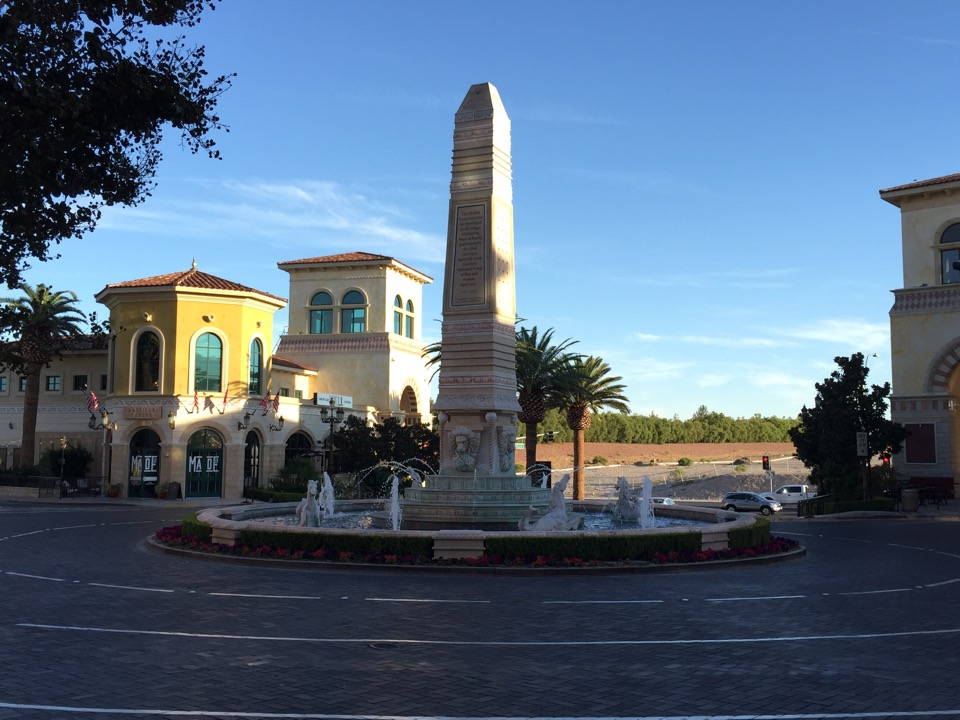
Roundabout in 2014

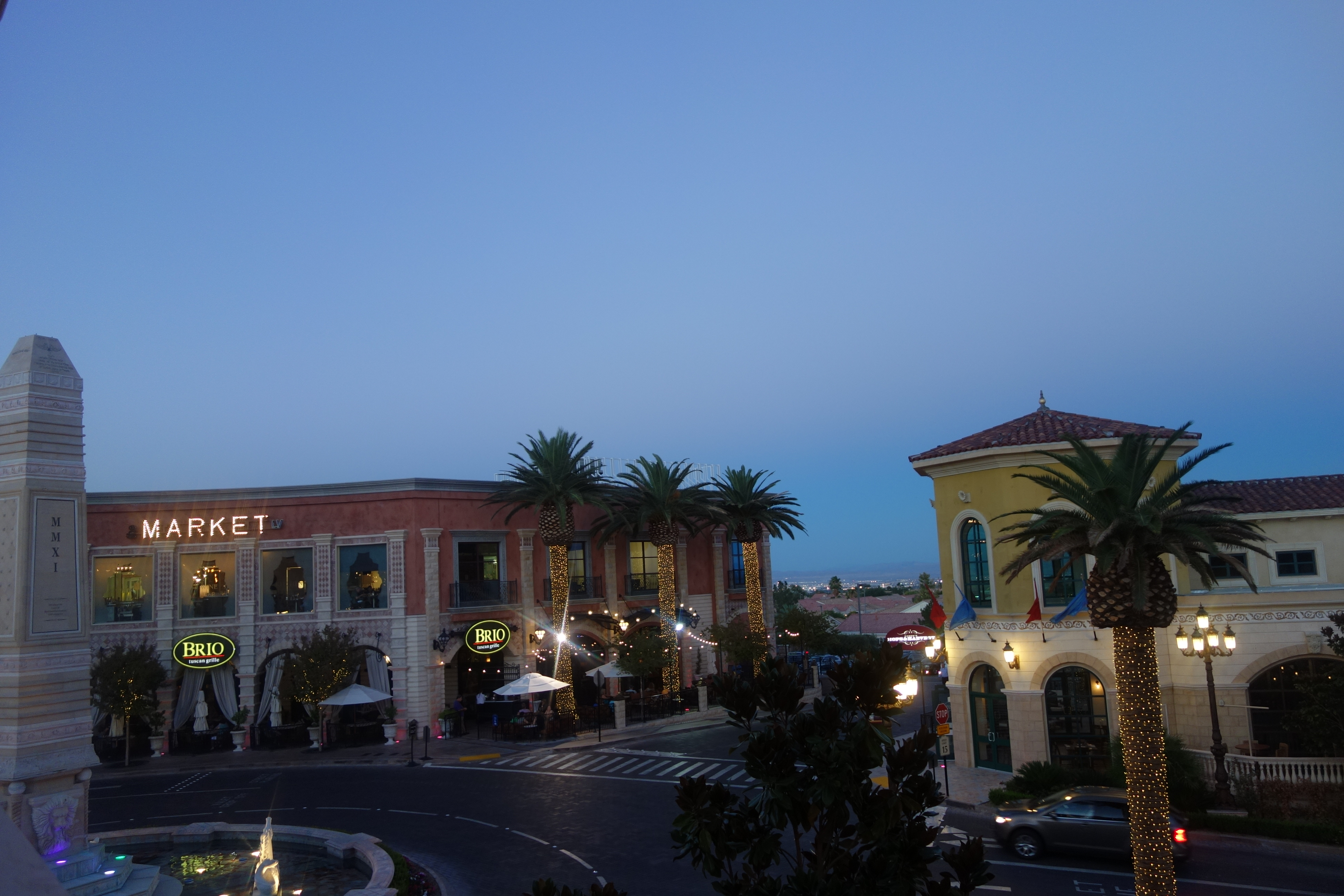
Roundabout at dusk

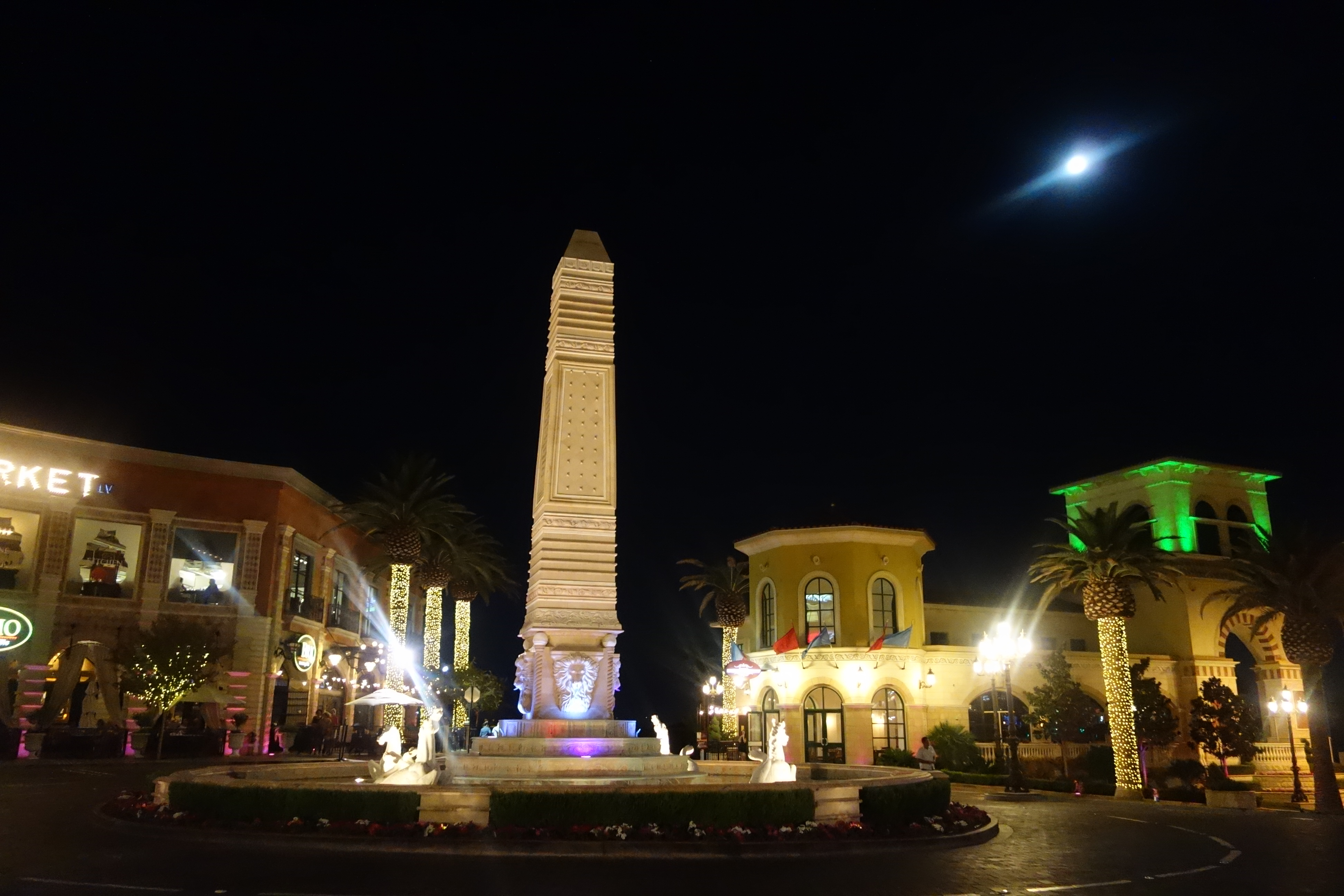
Roundabout at night

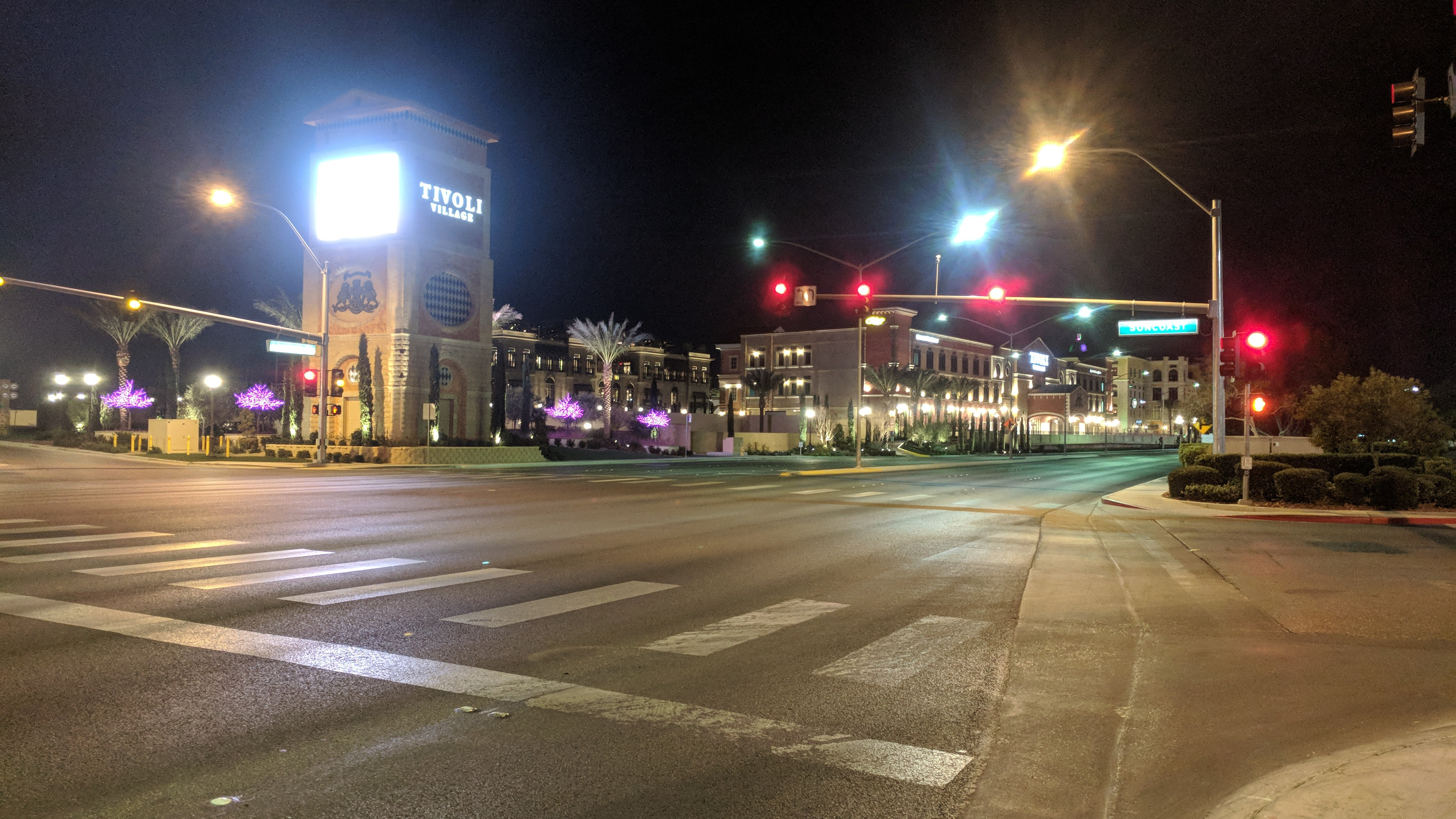
The northern end of Tivoli Village in 2018
