= List of deaths by motorcycle crash =

This is a list of people with Wikipedia articles who died in, or as a result of motorcycle crashes.

== Road crashes ==
The following people with biographies in Wikipedia died of road crashes involving motorcycles:

Name	Date	Age	Nationality	Notability	Make-model	Displacement (cc)	Location	Details	Source
T. E. Lawrence	May 18, 1935	46	British	Soldier, writer	Brough Superior SS100		Wareham, Dorset, England		
Tom Cooper	June 25, 1940	35	British	Footballer			Aldeburgh, England	Collided with lorry while on duty during WWII	
Bluey Wilkinson	July 27, 1940	28	Australian	Speedway rider			Bondi, New South Wales	Collided with lorry	
Ahmed Hassanein	February 19, 1946	56	Egyptian	Courtier and explorer			Qasr al-Nil Bridge, Cairo, Egypt	Collided with lorry	
Arthur Fox Jr.	June 15, 1953	29	Australian	Australian rules footballer			Ouyen, Victoria, Australia		
Ray Gibb	September 10, 1953	24	Australian	Australian rules footballer			Melbourne, Australia	Collided with milk cart	
Mario Gestri	December 4, 1953	29	Italian	Cyclist			Montecatini Terme	Had only purchased the bike a few days prior.	
Harry Bamford	October 31, 1958	38	British	Footballer			Clifton, Bristol, England	Collided with delivery van	
Richard Fariña	April 30, 1966	29	American	Musician			Near Carmel, California	Passenger	
Ron Rector	July 14, 1968	24	American	American football player	1967 Harley-Davidson		Columbus, Ohio	Crashed June 29, 29 on I-71	
Duane Allman	October 29, 1971	24	American	Musician	Harley-Davidson Sportster		Macon, Georgia, US		
Berry Oakley	November 11, 1972	24	American	Musician	1967 Triumph		Macon, Georgia	Three blocks from where fellow Allman Brothers Band member Duane Allman had his fatal motorcycle crash	
Don Rich	July 17, 1974	32		Musician (Buck Owens and the Buckaroos)					
Bob Gassoff	May 27, 1977	24	Canadian	Ice hockey player			Near Gray Summit, Missouri		
Stanley de Silva	April 12, 1980	23	Sri Lankan	Cricketer			Balapitiya, Sri Lanka		
John Gardner	September 14, 1982	49	American	Novelist	Harley-Davidson		Susquehanna County, Pennsylvania		
Gary Gabelich	January 26, 1984	43	American	Land speed record holder			San Pedro, Los Angeles		
Coluche, born Michel Colucci	June 19, 1986	41	French	Comedian					
Barry Mannakee	May 14, 1987	39	British	Royal Protection Squad bodyguard and alleged lover of Diana, Princess of Wales	Suzuki	400	Woodford, London	Death claimed by Diana to have been arranged by security services	
Pete de Freitas	June 14, 1989	27	British	Musician	Ducati	900	Longdon, Staffordshire, England	Collided with another vehicle	
Jay Ilagan	February 4, 1992	37	Filipino	Actor			Quezon City, Philippines	Hit by drunk driver	
Jason McRoy	August 24, 1995	23	British	Downhill mountain bike rider	Harley Davidson		A628, Derbyshire	(Note: collision with a lorry)	
Ric Segreto	September 6, 1998	63	Filipino	Musician, teacher			Makati, Philippines		
Pete Conrad	July 8, 1999	69	American	Third person to walk on the Moon	1996 Harley-Davidson		Ojai, California	(Note: Veered off road and crashed)	
Niccolò Galli	February 10, 2001	17	Italian	Footballer					
Andy Kirby	July 18, 2002	40		NASCAR Busch Series driver	1985 Harley-Davidson		White House, Tennessee		
Bahattin Sofuoğlu	October 25, 2002		Turkish	Motorcycle racer					
Tim Choate	September 24, 2004	49	American	Actor			Los Angeles, California		
Simon Milward	March 4, 2005	40		Humanitarian motorcyclist			Mali		
Norberto Napolitano "Pappo"	February 24, 2005	54	Argentine	Rock musician					
David Macpherson	August 31, 2006	82	Scottish	Nobleman				Collided with dustcart (garbage truck) seven weeks prior	
Sajjadul Hasan	March 16, 2007	28	Bangladeshi	Cricketer					
Manjural Islam Rana	March 16, 2007	22	Bangladeshi	Cricketer					
Diego Corrales	May 7, 2007	29	American	Boxer	2007 Suzuki GSXR 1000		Las Vegas, Nevada		
Lenar Gilmullin	June 22, 2007	22	Russian	Footballer					
Norifumi Abe	October 7, 2007	32	Japan	Motorcycle racer	Yamaha XP 500 TMAX maxi-scooter	500	Kawasaki, Kanagawa, Japan	(Note: Collision with a lorry, which made an illegal u-turn in front of him, when he was riding his motorcycle)	
Sophan Sophiaan	May 17, 2008	64	Indonesian	Actor, politician			Sragen Regency, Java, Indonesia	Ran into large pothole	
Luc Bourdon	May 29, 2008	21	Canadian	NHL prospect, 1st-round pick of the Vancouver Canucks	2009 Suzuki GSX-R1000	1000	Lamèque, New Brunswick, Canada		
Jonathan Goddard	June 15, 2008	27	American	Football player			Clay County, Florida		
Andrea Pininfarina	August 7, 2008	51	Italian	Engineer and manager, CEO of Pininfarina	Vespa GT60 scooter	250	Cambiano, Turin	(Note: A car driven by a 78-year-old man maneuvered from a side street around a parked lorry and pulled directly in front of Pininfarina)	Conditions at the time of the crash were very foggy.
Anatoly Khrapaty	August 11, 2008	45	Kazakh	Powerlifter, Olympic coach			Arshaly, Akmola, Kazakhstan		
Lee Eon	August 21, 2008	27	South Korean	Actor			Seoul, South Korea	Collided with overpass guardrail	
Jake Drake-Brockman	September 1, 2009	53	British	Musician	BSA motorcycle		Isle of Man	Collided with converted ambulance	
Atsushi Kuroi	February 1, 2010	40	Japanese	Drifting driver					
Calvin Blignault	August 21, 2010	30	South African	Mechanical engineer			Port Elizabeth, South Africa	Hit and run	
Steve Lee	October 5, 2010	47	Swiss	Musician			Mesquite, Nevada	Struck by motorcycle that was hit by a semi truck	
Douglas Blubaugh	May 16, 2011	76	American	Olympic wrestler			Tonkawa, Oklahoma	Struck by pickup truck	
Cosimo Caliandro	June 10, 2011	29	Italian	Runner			Francaville Fontana, Italy		
Sebastijan Pečjak	July 6, 2012	35	Slovene	Darts player			Ljubljana, Slovenia		
Thanasis Tribonias	July 24, 2012	28	Greek	Footballer, police officer			Athens, Greece	Lost control of motorcycle on duty	
Ranking Trevor	August 7, 2012	52	Jamaican	Deejay			Kingston, Jamaica	Collision	
Mitch Lucker	October 31, 2012	28	American	Former frontman of the band Suicide Silence	2013 Harley-Davidson		Huntington Beach, California		
Bo Lozoff	November 29, 2012	65	American	Humanitarian, writer	2003 Suzuki		Puna, Hawaii	Struck by motor vehicle	
Frank Pastore	December 17, 2012	55	American	Baseball player, radio host	Honda VTX series	1800	Duarte, California	Struck by car on November 19	
Cornelis Koster	March 21, 2013	69	Dutch	Academic			Netherlands		
Jefri Al Buchori	April 26, 2013	40	Indonesian	Islamic preacher, actor	Kawasaki ER-6n	650	South Jakarta, Indonesia	Collided with tree	
Mary Thom	April 26, 2013	68	American	Feminist, writer	1996 Honda Magna	750	Yonkers, New York	Struck by a vehicle after veering into traffic	
Darryl Read	June 23, 2013	61	British	Musician			Pattaya, Thailand		
Bill Beckwith	December 2, 2013	38	American	Carpenter, host of Curb Appeal			San Francisco, California	Collided with vehicle	
Andriy Husin	September 17, 2014	41	Ukrainian	Footballer, coach			Kyiv, Ukraine		
Andrea de Cesaris	October 5, 2014	55	Italian	Racing driver			Rome, Italy	Collided with freeway guardrail	
Nagare Hagiwara	April 22, 2015	62	Japanese	Actor			Suginami, Japan		
Joan Garriga	August 27, 2015	52	Spanish	Motorcycle racer			Barcelona, Spain		
Bruno Agostinelli	March 9, 2016	28	Canadian	Tennis player			Toronto, Ontario	Collided with another vehicle	
Antoine Demoitié	March 27, 2016	25	Belgian	Cyclist			Sainte-Marie-Cappel	Struck by motorbike after fall during race	
Trần Phước Thọ	April 17, 2016	23	Vietnamese	Footballer			Tân An, Long An, Vietnam		
Jory Prum	April 22, 2016	41	American	Audio engineer					
Oh Se-jong	June 27, 2016	33	South Korean	Olympic speed skater			Seoul, South Korea	Collided with vehicle	
Ed Ross	July 30, 2016	50	American	Photographer			Near Yosemite National Park		
Peter Pettalia	September 12, 2016	61	American	Politician			Montmorency County, Michigan		
Germaine Mason	April 20, 2017	34	Jamaican	Track and field athlete			Kingston, Jamaica		
Jayson Hinder	April 30, 2017	51	Australian	Politician			California, US		
Cris Bolado	September 17, 2017	47	Filipino	Basketball player			Phnom Penh, Cambodia		
Ismail Juma	November 3, 2017	26	Tanzanian	Runner			Arusha, Tanzania	Head-on collision with truck	
Leopoldo Cantancio	April 20, 2018	54	Filipino	Boxer			Bago, Negros Occidental, Philippines	Collided with post	
Brian Drebber	August 23, 2018	68	American	Sportscaster			Canton, Georgia, US	Collided with a deer	
Thalles	June 22, 2019	24	Brazilian	Footballer			São Gonçalo, Rio de Janeiro, Brazil		
Cedric Benson	August 17, 2019	36	American	Football player			Austin, Texas	Collided with minivan	
Braian Toledo	February 26, 2020	26	Argentine	Javelin thrower					
Stefano Bianco	March 11, 2020	34	Italian	Motorcycle racer	Honda CBR600RR	600	Turin, Italy	Collided with truck	
Adam Comrie	August 8, 2020	30	Canadian-American	Ice hockey player			Leesburg, Virginia		
Howard Mudd	August 12, 2020	78	American	Football player, coach			Seattle, Washington	Crashed on July 29	
Krisztián Veréb	October 24, 2020	43	Hungarian	Olympic canoe sprinter			Santo Domingo, Dominican Republic		
Éric Babin	January 11, 2021	61	New Caledonian	Politician			Voh, New Caledonia		
Odirlei Pessoni	March 27, 2021	38	Brazilian	Olympic bobsledder			Ibiraci, Brazil		
Diogo Oliveira	June 9, 2021	38	Brazilian	Footballer			Maringá, Brazil	Collided with post	
Sanchari Vijay	June 15, 2021	37	Indian	Actor	Yamaha FZ1	1000	Bengaluru, Karnataka, India	Collided with post on June 12	
Doug Bennett	July 16, 2021	75	American	Politician			Muskegon, Michigan	Crashed with a pickup truck	
David Patten	September 2, 2021	47	American	Football player			Columbia, South Carolina	Collided with sedan	
Paul Smart	October 27, 2021	78	British	Motorcycle racer			Kent/East Sussex, England		
Davy Tweed	October 28, 2021	61	Northern Irish	Politician			County Antrim, Northern Ireland		
Éric Guimbeau	March 5, 2024	63	Mauritian	Politician & CEO	Harley Davidson		Union Ducray, Mauritius	Emergency braking causing loss of control, ten impact by SUV	
Deniz Servan Narin	August 10, 2025	28	Turkish	Social media personality and Motorcycle stunt rider	BMW S1000RR		Kocaeli, Turkey	Collided with lorry while on highway	
Lane Rogers	December 15, 2025	31	American	Pornographic actor			Oxnard, California, US	Collided with a box truck	
Ceyda Yakova	August 17, 2026	22	Turkish	Motorcycle Content Creator and Social Media Personality	Yamaha YZF-R6		Şile, Istanbul, Turkey	Crashed into a roadside traffic sign	

== Stunt crashes ==
Name	Death	Age	Nationality	Notability	Make-model	Displacement (cc)	Location	Details	Source
"Indian Larry" Desmedt	August 30, 2004	55	American	Motorcycle builder and stuntman			Concord, North Carolina		
Butch Laswell	March 10, 1996	37	American	Motorcycle stunt rider	Honda CR500		Mesquite, Nevada		
Joi Harris	August 14, 2017	40	American	Motorcycle road racer and stuntwoman			Vancouver, British Columbia	Killed while filming a motorcycle stunt	http://www.thedrive.com/a-list/13482/stunt-woman-killed-in-motorcycle-accident-during-deadpool-2-filming
Dar Robinson	November 21, 1986	39	American	Stunt performer and actor			Page, Arizona		
Corey Scott	February 8, 1997	28	American	Motorcycle stunt rider			Miami, Florida		

== Testing crashes ==
- 1896 Sylvester H. Roper Cambridge, Massachusetts. Crash preceded by or followed by heart failure.
- 2007 Noriyasu Numata (JPN) Okayama International Circuit
- 2013 Kevin Ash, journalist, killed in South Africa while testing new BMW R1200GS

== See also ==
- Motorcycle safety
- List of motorcycle deaths in U.S. by year
- List of Billown Course fatal crashes
- List of Daytona International Speedway fatalities
- Category:Lists of motorsport fatalities
