= Corey Scott =

American motorcycle stunt performer (1968–1997)

- Scott attempting the fatal motorcycle jump
- Born: Corey L. Scott; December 28, 1968; Decatur, Indiana, U.S.
- Died: February 8, 1997 (aged 28); Orange Bowl, Miami, Florida, U.S.
- Cause of death: Motorcycle accident
- Resting place: Decatur, Indiana, U.S.
- Occupation: Motorcycle stunt rider
- Known for: Motorcycle stunts

Corey L. Scott (December 28, 1968 – February 8, 1997) was an American stunt performer and professional motorcycle stunt rider. Scott died during a live stunt in front of a crowd of around 30,000 spectators at the Orange Bowl stadium in Miami, Florida, while attempting to perform a dangerous step-up jump on a motorcycle. The fatal accident was captured on camera.

== Career ==
Scott was born in Decatur, Indiana and became interested in motorcycle stunt riding at age 15. His father died on January 8, 1987, when Scott was 18. That same year in 1987, Scott graduated from high school and moved to Florida. He then began performing with the Joie Chitwood Chevy Thunder Show, which he continued to work with for several years. He performed in over 2,000 shows with the Chitwood organization. He specialized in wheelies, the motorcycle-car precision driving exhibition and the motorcycle-pick up jump, where he jumped over a moving truck with a ramp attached to the back of it.

Scott later left Chitwood and formed his own independent company called Scott's Super Stunts. In 1995, Scott won a ramp-to-ramp jump competition in Charlotte, North Carolina. The competition aired on ESPN. He later took a break from stunts after suffering a head injury shortly after the competition. In 1996, he went back to stunt performing.

== Death ==
On the night of Saturday, February 8, 1997, Scott was performing at the Orange Bowl stadium in Miami, Florida at a U.S. Hot Rod Monster Jam. A crowd of around 30,000 spectators watched Scott attempt a dangerous step-up jump. Scott drove up a steep ramp on his motorcycle and was supposed to land into a net that was hoisted high into the air. Scott jumped over 70 feet (21 m) high on his motorcycle. He was meant to grab the net upon hitting it, but he missed, bounced out, and fell to the ground below. He landed on his head, broke his neck, and suffered other serious head and chest injuries. Scott was rushed to Jackson Memorial Hospital, where he was pronounced dead.

The fatality was witnessed by thousands and was caught on camera by people filming in the crowd. Scott had performed the stunt four times before with no problem. He was 28 years old at the time of his death. Many of the spectators in the crowd were young children who were deeply traumatized by witnessing the graphic death of Scott live. Parents reacted angrily and were hostile toward the organizers of the event.

== See also ==
- Butch Laswell
- List of deaths by motorcycle crash
