= Town Square (Las Vegas) =

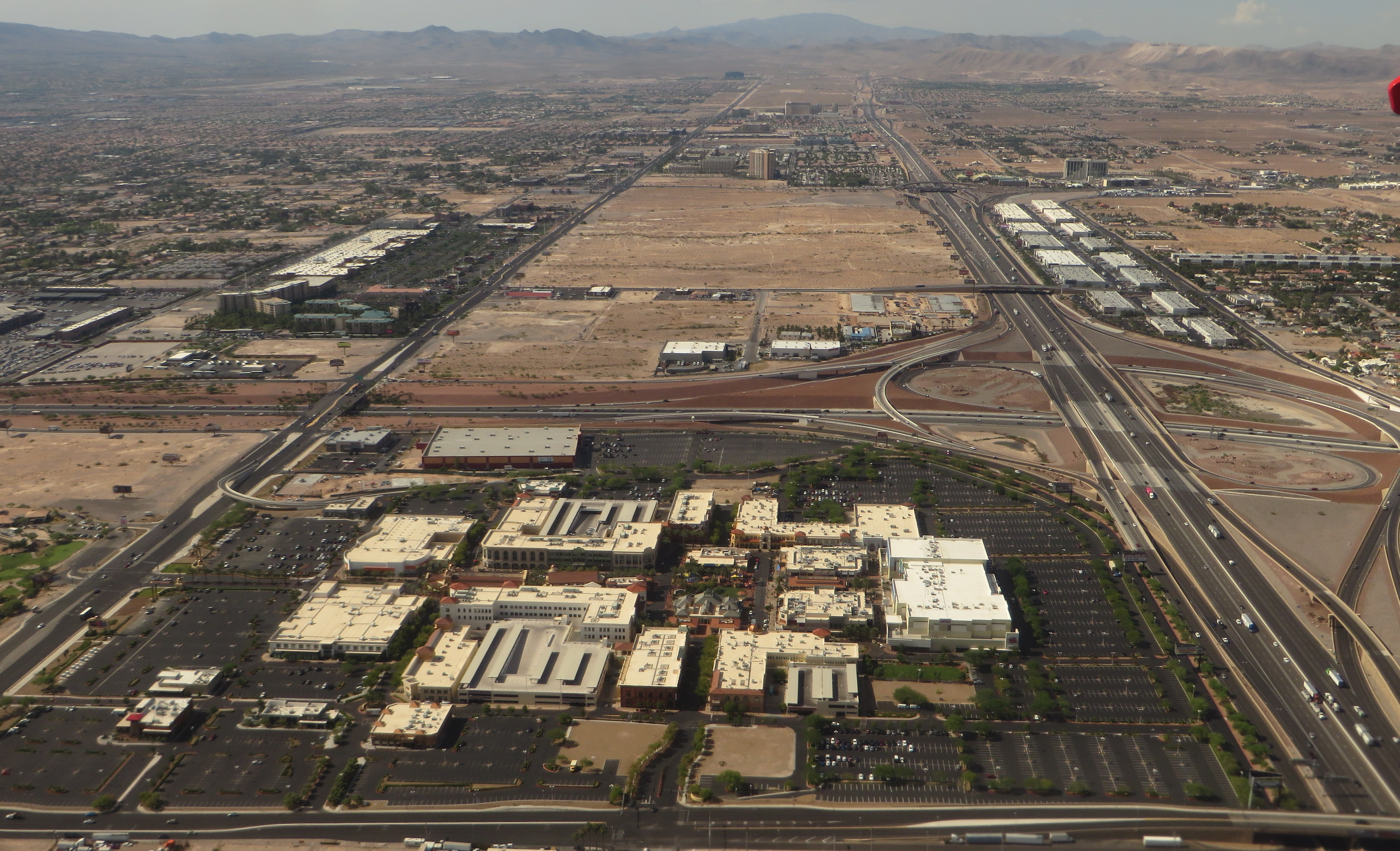
- Looking south over Town Square, 2018
- Location: Enterprise, Nevada
- Coordinates: 36°4′6″N 115°10′35″W
- Address: 6605 Las Vegas Boulevard South; Las Vegas, Nevada 89119
- Opened: November 14, 2007
- Developer: Turnberry Associates; Centra Properties
- Manager: Fairbourne Properties
- Owner: Teachers Insurance and Annuity Association of America; Fairbourne Properties
- Architect: Development Design Group; Alan J. Mayer Architect
- Num. of stores: 125+
- Num. of anchor tenants: 6
- Floor area: 1,200,000 sq ft (110,000 m^{2})
- Floors: 2-3
- Parking: 5,800
- Website: mytownsquarelasvegas.com

Town Square is an open-air shopping, dining, office, and entertainment center in Enterprise, Nevada, United States. It occupies approximately 100 acres (40 ha), located one mile south of the Las Vegas Strip. It was developed by Centra Properties and Turnberry Associates. Construction began in 2005, with Marnell Corrao Associates as general contractor. Town Square opened on November 14, 2007. It has 1.5 million square feet (140,000 m^{2}), including 350,000 sq ft (33,000 m^{2}) of office space. In 2017, Town Square was sold to Teachers Insurance and Annuity Association of America and Fairbourne Properties, with the latter also handling management.

== History ==
Town Square occupies approximately 100 acres (40 ha), and is located one mile south of the Las Vegas Strip. Centra Properties initially bought 57 acres from The Howard Hughes Corporation, with plans to build an industrial park. This project was scrapped when Centra partnered with Turnberry Associates to buy an adjacent 27 acres. The purchase was finalized in January 2004, and included the Vacation Village hotel-casino, which closed in 2002. Vacation Village occupied what is now the southeast corner of Town Square. Additional acreage was also acquired from Clark County. The property's location was considered desirable; its proximity to the Strip would make it an ideal tourist spot, and the site is also adjacent to Interstate 15 and the Las Vegas Beltway, providing easy access for local residents.

The companies announced Town Square, an outdoor mixed-use project, in May 2004. The project was designed by Development Design Group, which previously designed Easton Town Center in Ohio and CocoWalk in Florida. Alan J. Mayer Architect, a Boston-based firm, also worked on the project, referring to older cities such as Barcelona, Boston, New York, Paris and San Francisco for inspiration. Town Square blends historic and modern architecture; its buildings are made of brick, glass, stone, stucco, and terracotta. Designers spent considerable time to ensure that each building has subtle differences to one another. The project has a total of 22 buildings, and Development Design Group created 70 different storefront facades. The project also includes $15 million worth of landscaping, including palm-lined streets, and a $3 million children's park measuring 9,000 sq ft (840 m^{2}).

Construction of Town Square began in 2005, with Marnell Corrao Associates as general contractor. Town Square was built along the west side of Las Vegas Boulevard; a $5 million flyover ramp was built for northbound motorists, providing them easy access to Town Square without disrupting southbound traffic.

Valued at $750 million, Town Square was opened on November 14, 2007, amid the Great Recession. It opened with 38 tenants, while others debuted in 2008. The recession inadvertently aided Town Square by delaying several competing projects: Downtown Summerlin, Great Mall of Las Vegas, and Tivoli Village. Although it was built primarily for local residents, Town Square also quickly became popular with tourists.

In 2010, the project's lenders initiated foreclosure proceedings. The Soffer family, which founded Turnberry, subsequently sued Lehman Brothers, alleging that it refused to provide financing as agreed. Lenders foreclosed on Town Square in March 2011 and took over the property, leasing it to Forest City Enterprises for management purposes. Turnberry retained ownership of some unfinished office space at Town Square. Teachers Insurance and Annuity Association of America (TIAA) and Chicago-based Fairbourne Properties purchased Town Square in January 2017, taking an 85- and 15-percent ownership stake respectively. Fairbourne also took over management. Dornin Investment Group bought out Turnberry's remaining office space in 2018.

== Tenants ==
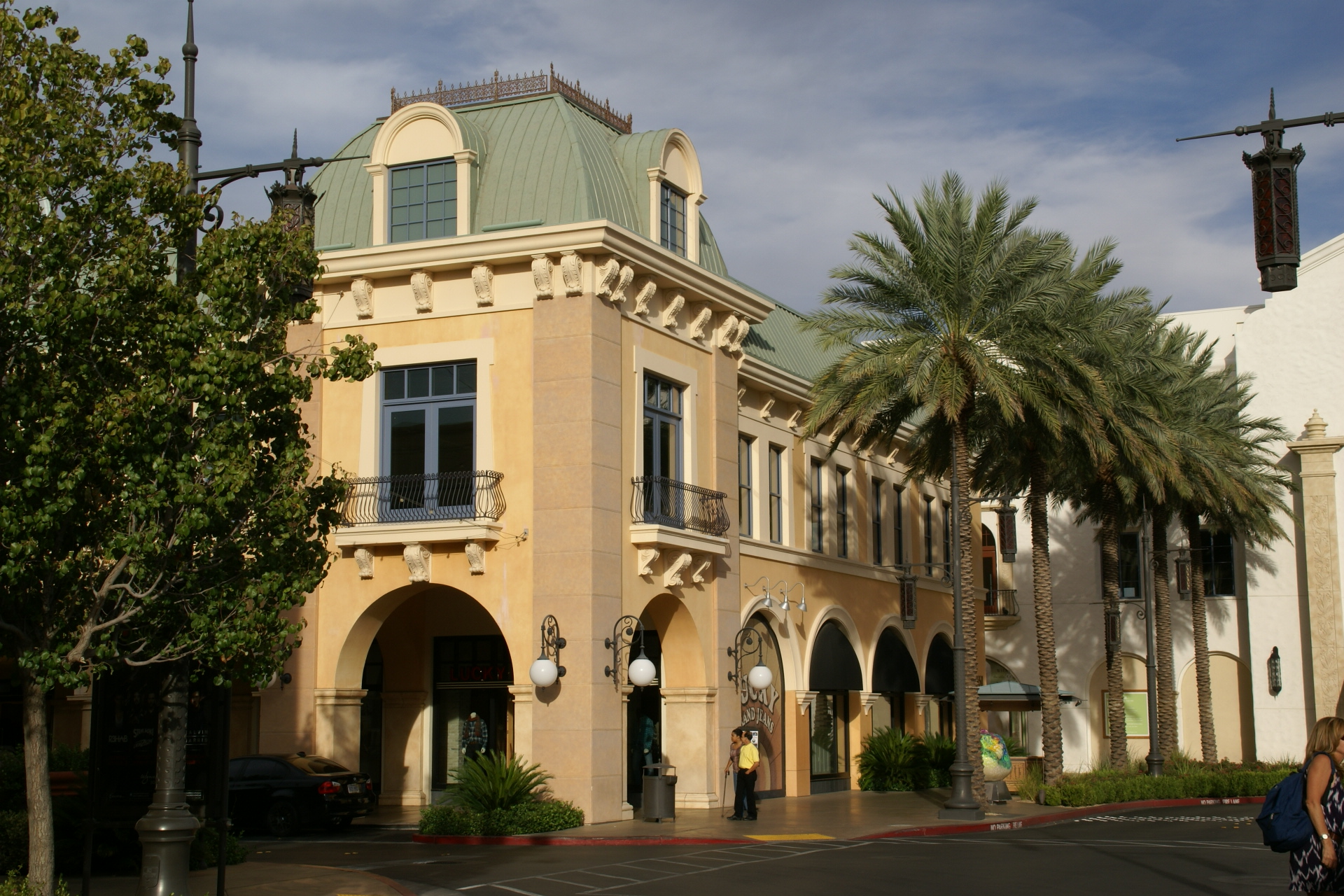
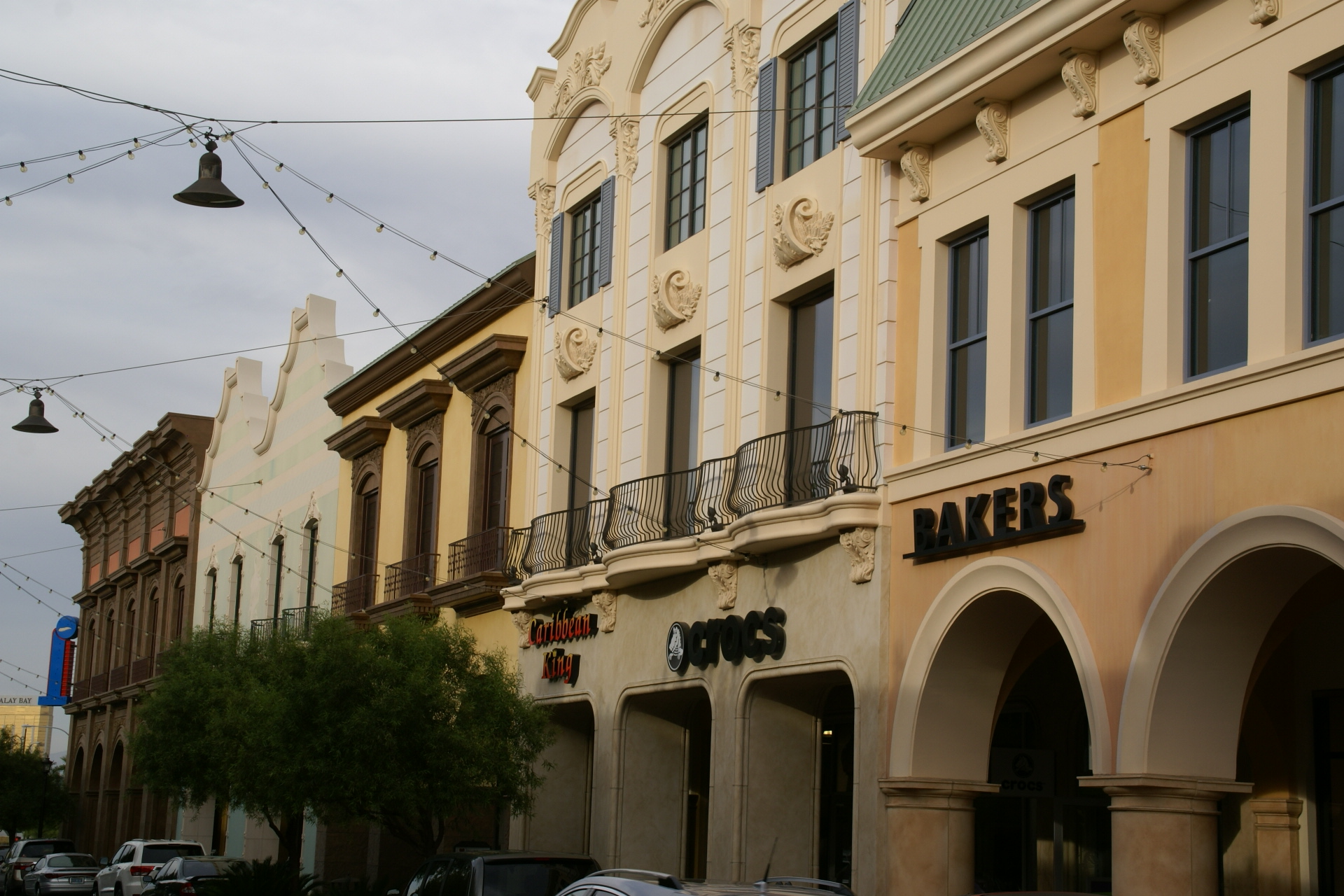
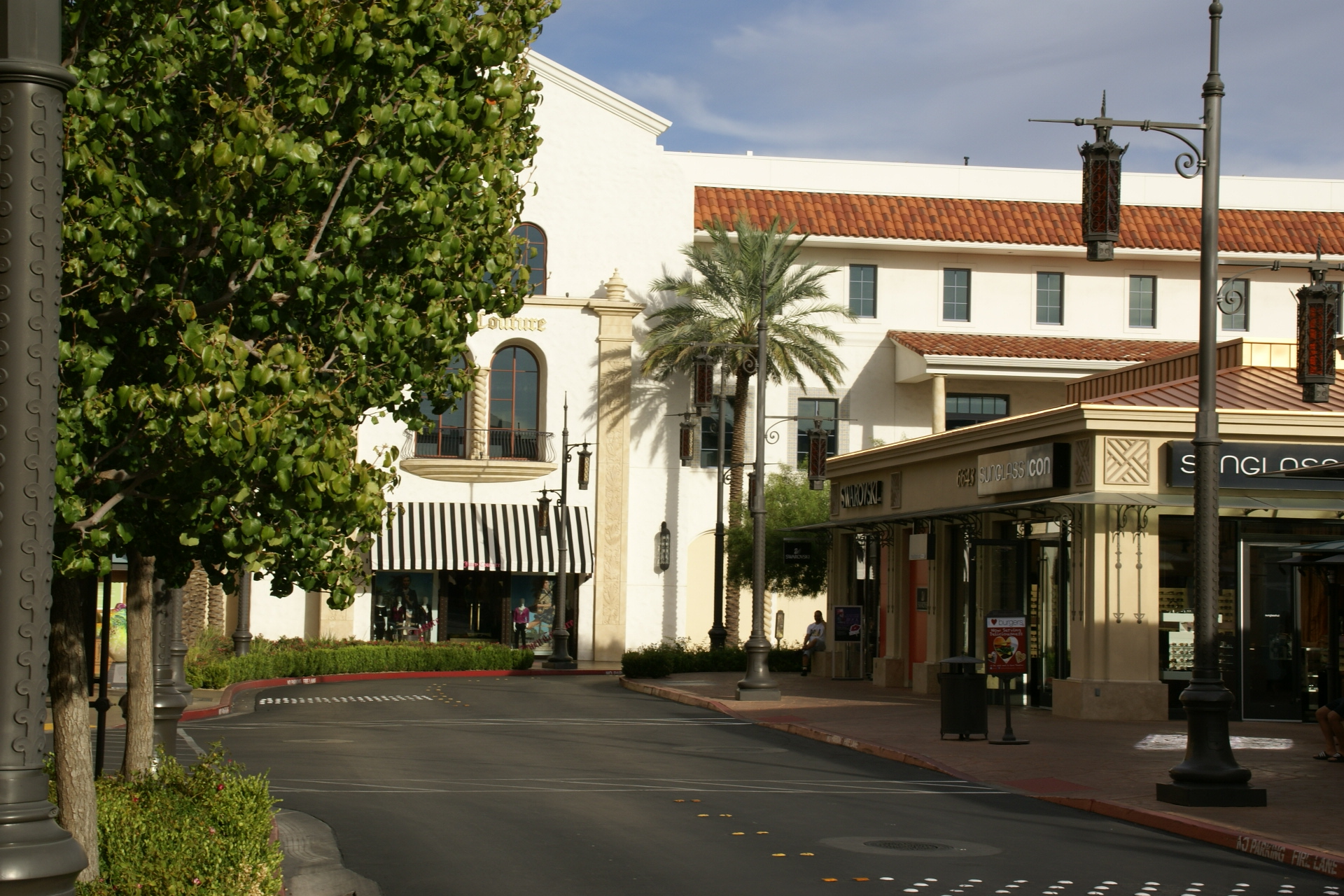
Various storefronts at Town Square

A nearby Fry's Electronics store, located south of Town Square, was purchased by Turnberry and Centra to become part of the mixed-use project ahead of its opening. The store originally opened in 2003, and closed in 2021 as the company ended operations. Town Square contains 1.5 million square feet (140,000 m^{2}), excluding the former Fry's building.

Among Town Square's original anchor tenants was an 18-screen Rave Motion Pictures movie theater, which has since become an AMC Theatres. Other anchors have included Borders, H&M, and Whole Foods Market. Borders ended operations in 2011, and its Town Square location was taken over by The Container Store a year later, marking the latter's debut in Nevada.

Other notable retailers have included Abercrombie & Fitch, Apple Store, Aveda, Charming Charlie, Crabtree & Evelyn, Eddie Bauer, Juicy Couture, Lucky Brand Jeans, Old Navy, Tommy Bahama, and Saks Fifth Avenue Off 5th. A 21,000 sq ft (2,000 m^{2}) TJ Maxx store opened in 2019, replacing Staples. Also included is a Raider Image team store for the Las Vegas Raiders football team. While the team's Allegiant Stadium was under construction, the Raiders had a 7,500-square-foot stadium preview center at Town Square, featuring interactive exhibits, team memorabilia, and simulations of views from individual seats and a large-scale stadium model.

Town Square opened with several restaurants, including Yard House. Fleming's Prime Steakhouse & Wine Bar opened a location at Town Square in 2014, as did GameWorks. The latter closed in 2021, when the company ended operations. Flecha, a Mexican restaurant by actor Mark Wahlberg, opened in 2024.

Shear Madness, an interactive play, ran briefly at Town Square during 2009. It closed as a result of the Great Recession. Pete's Dueling Piano Bar, based in Texas, operated a Town Square location from 2009 to 2012.

Town Square opened with 350,000 sq ft (33,000 m^{2}) of office space, located above the retail space. Notable office tenants have included Amazon.com, SolarCity, WeWork, DraftKings, the Las Vegas Chamber of Commerce, and the Mountain West Conference, which moved its headquarters from Colorado Springs, Colorado to Town Square in July 2026.

PopStroke, a chain of mini-golf attractions by Tiger Woods, opened at Town Square in 2024, marking its first Nevada location and 13th overall.

Upon opening, future plans for Town Square included a 270-room hotel. TIAA and Fairbourne have also considered the addition of a hotel, which would be constructed on the property's northwestern area. However, it remains unbuilt as of 2022.
