= Beyond Desire =

- VHS cover
- Directed by: Dominique Othenin-Girard
- Written by: Dale Trevillion
- Produced by: Frank Cinelli
- Starring: William Forsythe; Kari Wuhrer
- Cinematography: Sven Kirsten
- Edited by: Dan Duncan
- Music by: Mark Holden
- Production company: Beyond Pictures
- Distributed by: LIVE Entertainment (U.S.); Beyond Pictures (Worldwide)
- Release dates: July 13, 1995 (Germany); April 23, 1996 (United States)
- Running time: 87 minutes
- Country: United States
- Language: English

Beyond Desire is a 1995 American action thriller film produced by Frank Cinelli, directed by Dominique Othenin-Girard, written by Dale Trevillion, and starring William Forsythe and Kari Wuhrer. It was released first in Germany on July 13, 1995, followed by the United States on April 23, 1996 by Live Entertainment. It was released in the United Kingdom as The Last American Elvis.

== Plot ==
Ray "Elvis" Patterson, an ex-con, joins forces with a sexy, high-priced call girl named Rita to help clear his name from a murder charge 14 years earlier while a brutal gangster is after him for the location of some stolen money. Ray served 14 years at Nevada State Prison, after being wrongfully convicted of the murder of his girlfriend.

Now released, Ray sets out to find the true murderer and bring him to justice. Ray and Rita head into Las Vegas together, where Ray believes he will find the answers as to who the killer is. But all is not as it seems as Frank, Rita's boss, turns out to be the man Ray seeks.

Non-stop action and adventure ensue as bullets fly and Ray and Frank go head to head for justice, Rita's heart, and the money that turned up missing from the crime scene 14 years ago.

== Cast ==
- William Forsythe as Ray Patterson
- Kari Wuhrer as Rita
- Leo Rossi as Frank Zulla
- Sharon Farrell as Shirley

== Production ==
Production took place in Las Vegas. Minor filming locations included the La Concha Motel, the Vacation Village hotel and casino, and the Riviera hotel and casino. Scenes were also filmed at Hoover Dam's power plant.

== Reception ==
"Only the easily-pleased will enjoy this silly saga about a prisoner of love who rights a wrong and salvages a call girl's bed-hopping existence.", commented TV Guide.

Entertainment Weekly found that "The novelty lessens once the character acknowledges his resemblance to Elvis, but it’s still a chance to see how the King’s movie career might have gone in the worst possible world."

The Roanoke Times stated, "Mystery fans won't have much trouble predicting most of the plot turns, and the action scenes aren't all they could be, either. But the leads are everything you could ask for. Forsythe, who's also executive producer, brings his usual intensity, and Wuhrer, always in danger of falling out of her skimpy costumes, is convincingly sexy."

The Canadian website MediaFilm assessed the film as follows: "Story with proven recipes. Average directing. Quite colourful acting by W. Forsythe."
