= Butch Laswell =

American motorcycle stunt performer (1958–1996)

- Laswell attempting the fatal motorcycle jump
- Born: Sherman Dwayne Laswell; October 12, 1958; Las Vegas, Nevada, U.S.
- Died: March 10, 1996 (aged 37); Mesquite, Nevada, U.S.
- Cause of death: Motorcycle accident
- Resting place: Las Vegas, Nevada, U.S.
- Occupation: Motorcycle stunt rider
- Known for: Motorcycle stunts

Sherman Dwayne "Butch" Laswell (October 12, 1958 – March 10, 1996) was an American stunt performer and professional motorcycle stunt rider. Laswell died after sustaining injuries during a live stunt in front of a crowd of spectators, while attempting to carry out a dangerous motorcycle jump in Mesquite, Nevada. The accident was captured on camera.

== Career ==
Laswell was a native of Las Vegas, Nevada, but grew up in Overton, Nevada. From a young age he became a fan of Evel Knievel, which is what first led him to pursue motorcycle stunt riding. At age 12 he began building ramps and jumping over his parents' car on his bicycle. Laswell got his first motorcycle at age 15 and pursued desert motorcycle racing. By age 17 he was one of Nevada's top desert bike racers and achieved a professional status two years later. Laswell's true passion, however, was in motorcycle jumping. He began doing small performances and jumped over school buses and big rigs.

One of Laswell's earliest achievements was when he beat the World's Long Distance Jump Record of 176 feet (54 m), which he achieved in 1981 when he jumped 180 feet (55 m) on a 440 Maico. He then pursued his motorcycle career full-time and took motorcycle stunts and ramp-to-ramp jumping to the next level. In the 1980s Laswell filmed a TV commercial for the US Coast Guard and appeared in the reality television show, That's Incredible!, in which he filmed a world record wheelie demo. He then spent several years working for the Globe of death circus, where he performed a variety of motorcycle stunts never before attempted. In January 1992, at the Vacation Village hotel, Laswell established the world's highest motorcycle ramp-to-ramp aerial jump. He set the record at 41 feet (12 m).

== Death ==
On Sunday, March 10, 1996, outside the Oasis hotel and casino in Mesquite, Nevada, Laswell attempted to jump over a 38-foot-high (12 m) pedestrian bridge by driving up a steep ramp on a Honda CR500 motorcycle. As he made the jump and became airborne, he was blown off course in mid-air. Crosswinds and excessive speed pushed Laswell to the left of the landing ramp. Laswell then flatlanded from 65 feet (20 m) high and crashed to the concrete below. According to witnesses Laswell tried to steer his bike away from the crowd. Laswell had been trying to break his personal best of 41 feet (12 m) high and set a world record. Laswell's trachea was crushed and his skull and chest were cracked, among many other internal injuries. Footage of the accident was also captured on camera by movie crews who were filming the event live. Paramedics took Laswell back toward Las Vegas in an ambulance, meeting a Flight for Life helicopter next to the highway for a transfer. Laswell died in the helicopter during the transfer and was pronounced dead at 4:39 p.m.

=== Aftermath ===
Some friends and associates said Laswell was fearful of making the jump because of gusting winds. Others said he was determined to carry out the jump to avoid disappointing a crowd of thousands that had gathered to watch him, as well as movie crews who were filming the scene. Laswell's closest friends blamed the wind for the failed jump. Laswell's manager, Douglas MacValley, contends the disaster resulted from a mechanical problem and a strategic error. Lt. Governor Lonnie Hammargren, a noted brain surgeon and friend of Laswell, said he did not feel the paramedics responding to the crash provided adequate support to keep Laswell alive. Hammargren was in the crowd and was reportedly pushed away from Laswell's body by emergency personnel after the crash. Hammargren rode with Laswell in the Flight for Life helicopter, where he succumbed to his injuries. Laswell was then flown to University Medical Center. Hammargren has stated publicly that a tracheotomy was necessary to keep Laswell alive, but was not performed by Mesquite paramedics. Footage of the fatal stunt was caught on video camera by movie crews who were filming the event live. The footage has been shown on television documentaries as well as the 1998 shockumentary film, Banned from Television.

== See also ==
- Corey Scott
- List of deaths by motorcycle crash
