= Carlos Rodríguez (darts player) =

Spanish darts player (born 1979)

Personal information
- Full name: Carlos José Rodríguez Sequera
- Nickname: "The Spanish Assassin"
- Born: January 28, 1979 (age 47) Sabadell, Catalonia, Spain
- Home town: Terrassa, Catalonia, Spain

Sport
- Sport: Darts
- Playing since: 1997
- Darts: 25g Bull's Champion Carlos Rodriguez
- Laterality: Right-handed
- Walk-on music: "I Want It All" by Queen

Organisation (see split in darts)
- BDO: 2006–2008
- PDC: 2008–2017

WDF major events – best performances
- World Masters: Last 190: 2007

PDC premier events – best performances
- World Championship: Last 32: 2009
- UK Open: Last 96: 2008
- European Championship: Last 16: 2008

Other tournament wins
- Years
Gibraltar Open	2007
PDC World West European Qualifying	2012
Soft Tip SDWF European Ch'ship	2000, 2006
- Updated on 18 March 2019

Carlos José Rodríguez Sequera (born January 28, 1979) is a Spanish former professional darts player.

== Darts career ==
A noted soft-tip player, Rodríguez's first foray into the professional steel-tip darts scene was participating in the two PDPA Players Championship events in Gibraltar in January 2007; in the latter of these he placed in the last 16. Two months later, he would win the Gibraltar Open. Rodríguez then attempted to qualify for the BDO World Championship in November but failed, and in the same month he failed to make any headway in the World Masters.

In 2008 he decided to join the Professional Dart Players Association, enabling him to play in PDC events. Because he is based in Spain, he is unable to travel to every event on the PDC Pro Tour, however a couple of last 16 placings in Players Championship events and UK Open regionals meant he qualified for the UK Open, his first appearance on television. He entered at the last 96 stage, but was beaten 6–1 by Paul Cooper. In October, he tried to qualify for the 2008 Grand Slam of Darts but was defeated in the early rounds. Later that month however, Rodríguez began to finally make significant gains in the PDC. In the second of two Players Championship events in Scotland, he reached his first PDC quarter-final before being defeated by the eventual winner James Wade.

The run of form continued in October as Rodríguez reached the final of the German Darts Trophy, beating noted veterans Peter Manley and Kevin Painter 3–0 in the quarter-finals and semi-finals, before being defeated in a last leg decider by Colin Osborne. This performance guaranteed Rodríguez's place in the inaugural European Championship and the 2009 PDC World Championship. Less than a week later Rodríguez, in a major upset, defeated the world number five Terry Jenkins in the opening round of the 2008 European Championship, but lost to Ronnie Baxter in the next round.

Rodríguez began his 2009 PDC World Championship campaign with a 3–2 win over then world number 16 Roland Scholten of the Netherlands to safely carry him through the second round, but he was then beaten 1–4 by Painter. At the 2010 World Championship, he was defeated 0–3 by Steve Beaton in the first round.

He teamed up with Antonio Alcinas to represent Spain at the 2010 PDC World Cup of Darts. They defeated Japan in the first round, before knocking out the top seeds England (represented by the world's top two players, Phil Taylor and James Wade) 6–5 in the second round. In the group stage, they lost to Wales but defeated the United States and Scotland to qualify for the semi-finals, where they were whitewashed 0–4 by the Netherlands.

He partnered Alcinas again in the 2012 World Cup, but they could not repeat their success of 2010 as they were beaten 2–5 by South Africa in the first round. In the rest of 2012 his best results in ProTour events were runs to the last 64, which he did three times.

Rodriguez qualified for the 2013 World Championship by winning the West European Qualifying Event with a 6–5 victory over Stefan Couwenberg in the final. He lost to John Bowles by four legs to two in the preliminary round, as he hit just 14% of his darts at a double. After the tournament Rodriquez was ranked world number 111, meaning he had lost his place on the tour and therefore entered Q School in order to regain a tour card for PDC events in 2013. However, he could not advance past the last 64 on any of the four days and will not have automatic entry into any PDC event in 2013.

Rodríguez played with Antonio Alcinas for the third time in the World Cup of Darts and they qualified from Group D courtesy of a 5–3 win over Italy. They then repeated their 2010 shock win over the Scottish pair of Gary Anderson and Robert Thornton this time 5–4 and faced Richie Burnett and Mark Webster in the quarter-finals. Alcinas lost to Webster 3–4, but Rodríguez beat Burnett by the same scoreline to mean a doubles match was needed to settle the tie. Spain took an early 2–1 lead but went on to be defeated 2–4. In the second round of the 2014 edition of the event, Rodríguez and Alcinas lost their singles matches against the Dutch pair of Michael van Gerwen and Raymond van Barneveld to exit the tournament.

Rodríguez was beaten in the final of the 2016 Alcalas Open by Julio Barbero.

Rodríguez quit the PDC in January 2017.

== World Championship results ==
=== PDC ===
- 2009: Second round (lost to Kevin Painter 1–4)
- 2010: First round (lost to Steve Beaton 0–3)
- 2013: Preliminary round: (lost to John Bowles 2–4 in legs)
