= Enterprise, Nevada =

- Unincorporated town
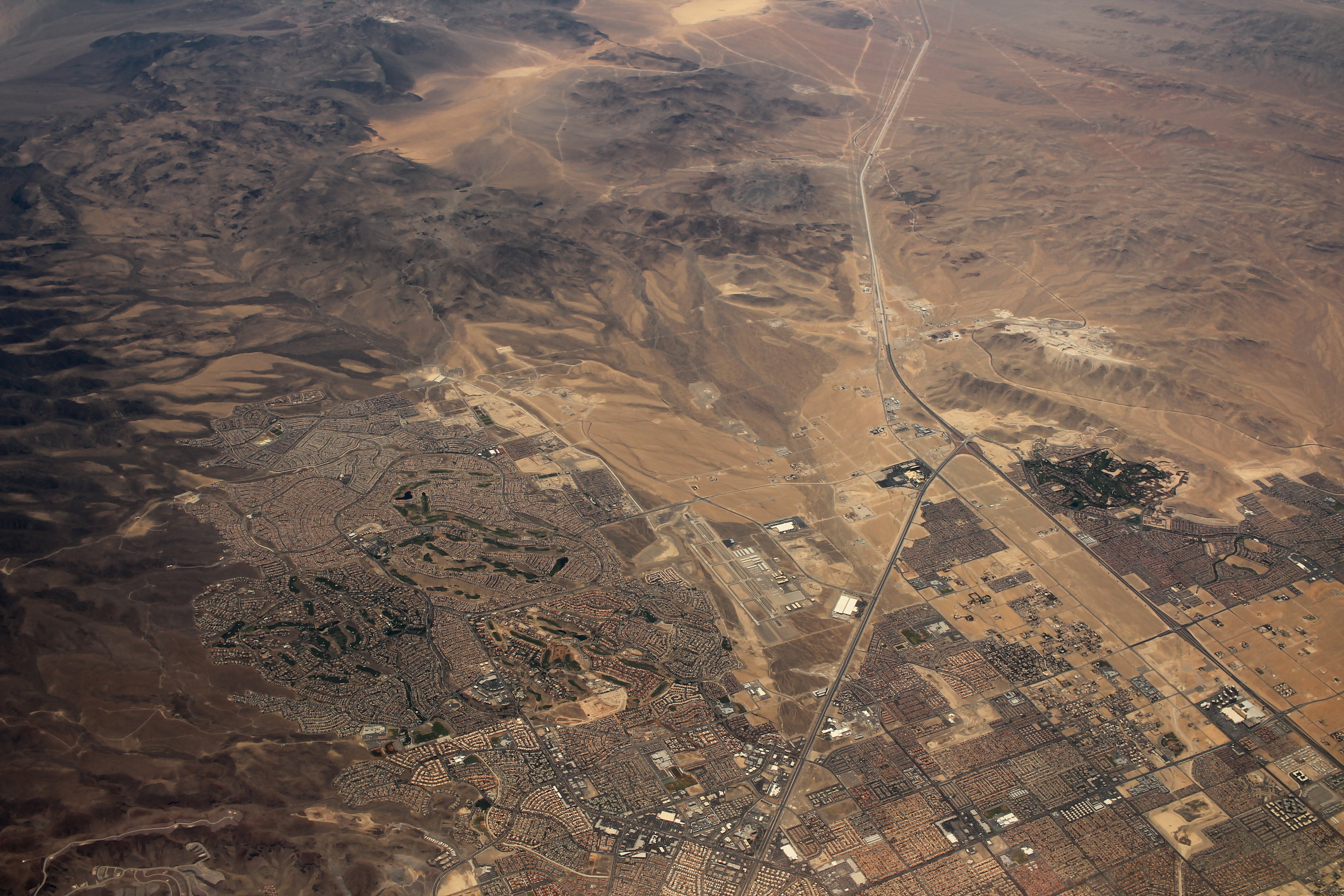
- Aerial view of southwestern Henderson (left) and Enterprise (right) with Interstate 15 in between.

- Location of Enterprise in Clark County, Nevada
- Coordinates: 36°1′53″N 115°11′53″W
- Country: United States
- State: Nevada
- County: Clark
- Founded: December 17, 1996; 29 years ago
- Founder: Clark County Commission

Government
  - Type: Advisory Board
  - County Commissioner: Justin Jones – District F
  - County Commissioner: Michael Naft – District A
  - Board Chair: Joseph Throneberry

Area
  - Total: 66.00 sq mi (170.94 km^{2})
  - Land: 66.00 sq mi (170.94 km^{2})
  - Water: 0 sq mi (0.00 km^{2})
- Elevation: 2,552 ft (778 m)

Population (2020)
  - Total: 221,831
  - Density: 3,361.1/sq mi (1,297.73/km^{2})
- Time zone: UTC-8 (PST)
  - Summer (DST): UTC-7 (PDT)
- Postal codes: 89113,89118, 89119, 89123, 89139, 89141 89183
- Area codes: 702 and 725
- FIPS code: 32-23770
- GNIS feature ID: 1867345
- Website: Enterprise Town Advisory Board

Enterprise is an unincorporated town in the Las Vegas Valley in Clark County, Nevada, United States. The population was 221,831 at the 2020 U.S. census, up from 14,676 at the 2000 census. It was founded on December 17, 1996. As in other unincorporated towns in the Las Vegas Valley, its ZIP Codes are assigned the place name "Las Vegas" for mailing addresses.

== History ==
The first inhabitants were the Paiute Indians, who were spread across the Las Vegas Valley. In 1905, the railroad town of Arden was formed for miners who worked at the nearby gypsum mines just west of the area. The area was part of Lincoln County until 1909, when Clark County was split off from Lincoln County. The oldest structure in the area is a water tower, which was built in 1926.

References to the area as "Enterprise" date back to at least 1918, when county commissioners established an Enterprise school district. According to one historian, the word may simply have been chosen at that time as a positive-sounding name.

On April 21, 1958, United Airlines Flight 736 and an Air Force jet collided into each other, causing 49 fatalities. The airliner crash site in 1958 was empty desert scrubland, but today commercial development near the intersection of South Decatur Boulevard and West Cactus Avenue, adjacent to the community of Southern Highlands, has encroached on the site. In 1999 a small metal cross was put up by the son of a victim as a memorial to the lives lost.

Enterprise was formed as an unincorporated town on December 17, 1996, in response to a petition from residents who hoped it would help preserve the community's semi-rural identity. This was made to prevent annexation by nearby Henderson. Immediately afterwards, Clark County commissioners voted to annex about five square miles of land into neighboring Spring Valley that included the master-planned community of Rhodes Ranch and a regional park. The annexation plan was developed by commissioner Erin Kenny. The vote was almost unanimous, with the sole exception of Bruce L. Woodbury voting against annexation. The chairwoman of the county commission, Yvonne Atkinson Gates, was against the annexation, but voted for annexation anyway because she wanted to recall the situation after the next advisory board meeting in January 1997. Residents, both governmental and non-governmental, opposed the annexation because they had no say in the vote.

On January 19, 1999, an interlocal agreement was approved by the Clark County Commission and the Henderson City Council to annex about 5,000 to 6,000 acres of land into the City of Henderson, with most of the land belonging to the Bureau of Land Management southwest of the master-planned community of Anthem, but also including 1,400 acres that were part of Enterprise. The city wanted to annex land so it could have an exit on Interstate 15 (specifically the Sloan exit), and so they could maintain Lake Mead Drive (now St. Rose Parkway). Residents of Enterprise did not approve of the annexation plan because they wanted to preserve their rural lifestyle. County commissioners told some residents that the county could not stop Henderson from annexing a piece of their town, and said that the interlocal agreement was the best they could do. This agreement stopped Henderson from annexing section 33 (which was a heavily populated section of Enterprise), and instead annex sections 26 and 34, which were, at the time, undeveloped.

Not long after the founding of Enterprise, population and development have seen a rapid growth, similar to many other communities in unincorporated Clark County. From 2000 to 2010, the population boosted from 14,108 residents to 108,481 in 2010; the number would more than double to 221,831 in 2020.

== Geography ==
According to the United States Census Bureau, the census-designated place (CDP) of Enterprise (which may not coincide exactly with the town boundaries) has a total area of 46.51 square miles (120.5 km^{2}). Enterprise is the location of the Mountain's Edge planned community and Southern Highlands. Enterprise is bordered by Spring Valley to the north, Paradise to the east, Henderson to the southeast, Sloan to the south, and Blue Diamond to the west. Enterprise's main northern boundary is with Sunset Road, mainly Bermuda Road to the east, St. Rose Parkway to the southeast, and mainly the Union Pacific Railroad tracks to the southwest.

== Government ==
As an unincorporated town, Enterprise is governed by the Clark County Commission, with input from the Enterprise Town Advisory Board. Enterprise is part of the Las Vegas Township.

Policing is provided by the Enterprise Area Command of the Las Vegas Metropolitan Police Department.

Federally, all of Enterprise falls within Nevada's 3rd Congressional District, which is represented by Susie Lee, a Democrat. Several State Senators represent parts of the area, including Republican Michael Roberson (District 20) and Democrats Melanie Scheible (District 9) and Dallas Harris (District 11). Significant portions of Enterprise are represented in the Assembly by Democrats Duy Nguyen (District 8), Michelle Gorelow (District 35) and Sandra Jauregui (District 41).

== Demographics ==
Historical population
Census	Pop.	Note	%±
2000	14,676		—
2010	108,481		639.2%
2020	221,831		104.5%

As of the census of 2010, there were 108,481 people, 44,872 households residing in the CDP. The population density was 2,332.3 inhabitants per square mile (900.5/km^{2}). There were 49,563 housing units. The racial makeup of the CDP was 56.3% White, 8.1% African American, 0.6% Native American, 21.2% Asian, 0.9% Pacific Islander, 6.8% from other races, and 6.1% from two or more races. Hispanic or Latino of any race were 17.3%. Non-Hispanic Whites were 48.1%.

There were 97,869 households, out of which 31.61% had children under the age of 18 living with them, 38.7% were married couples living together, The average household size was 2.58 and the average family size was 3.24.

The median household income in Enterprise is $93,980. The average household net worth in Enterprise is $442,021.

The Southern Highlands area, in the south of Enterprise, has a median household income of $138,134 and an average household net worth of $819,866.

== Economy ==
The Silverton and the South Point Hotel, Casino & Spa are the only casino resorts located in Enterprise. Town Square Las Vegas, previously the location of the Vacation Village hotel and casino, is another major attraction that falls within the boundaries. Las Vegas Premium Outlets South, the southern counterpart to Las Vegas Premium Outlets North, is another attraction in Enterprise. The economy of Enterprise employs 66,636 people. The economy of Enterprise is specialized in Arts, Entertainment, Recreation; Accommodation & Food Service; and Real Estate, Rental & Leasing, which employ respectively 5.14; 2.95; and 1.67 times more people than what would be expected in a location of this size. The largest industries in Enterprise are Accommodation & Food Service (15,756), Arts, Entertainment, Recreation (7,782), and Retail trade (7,486), and the highest paying industries are Management of Companies & Enterprises ($193,833), Mining, Quarrying, Oil, Gas Extraction( $78,750), and Utilities ($67,273).

The Ultimate Fighting Championship (UFC) opened the UFC Performance Institute in Enterprise in 2017, listing the new location as the organization headquarters. In June 2019, the company opened the UFC Apex across the street, which is being used to host US events during the COVID-19 pandemic, and continues to do after mass live event attendance resumed.

== Education ==
Public education in Enterprise is administered by the Clark County School District.

- Charles and Phyllis Frias Elementary School
- Aldeane Comito Ries Elementary School
- Evelyn Stuckey Elementary School
- Dennis Ortwein Elementary School
- Beverly S. Mathis Elementary School
- Carolyn S. Reedom Elementary School
- William V. Wright Elementary School
- Mark L. Fine Elementary School
- Tony Alamo Elementary School
- Judith D. Steele Elementary School
- Wayne N. Tanaka Elementary School
- Robert L. Forbuss Elementary School
- Lois and Jerry Tarkanian Middle School
- Lawrence and Heidi Cannarelli Middle School
- Wilbur and Theresa Faiss Middle School
- Desert Oasis High School
- Sierra Vista High School
- Southern Highlands Preparatory School
- Southwest Career and Technical Academy
- Don and Dee Snyder Elementary School
- Jan Jones Blackhurst Elementary School

Enterprise has two public libraries, Enterprise Library, and Windmill Library, both branches of the Las Vegas-Clark County Library District. The latter serves as the headquarters for the LVCCLD.

== Transportation ==
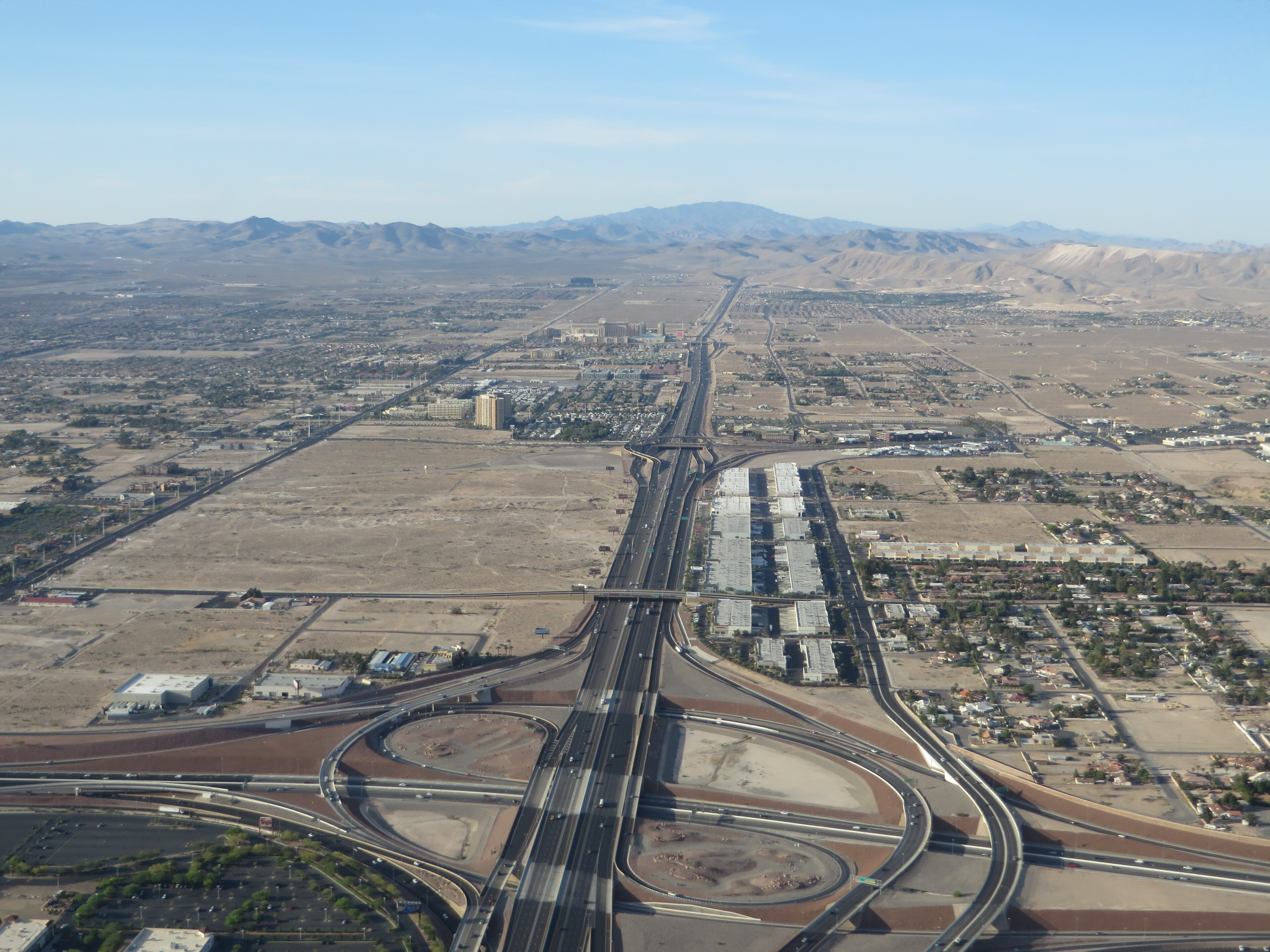
Aerial view of the I-15/I-215 interchange in Enterprise looking south from Sunset Road in 2014

The following are all the major highways in Enterprise.

- Interstate 15
- Interstate 215
- Nevada State Route 146
- Nevada State Route 160
- Nevada State Route 562
- Clark County Route 215

== Notable people ==
This is an incomplete list of notable residents in the Enterprise area.

- Marc-André Fleury, professional hockey player
- Dave Aron, music producer
- DJ Ashba, musician, producer
- Bobby Baldwin, professional poker player, casino executive
- Toni Braxton, musician
- Chris Carter, professional baseball player
- Nick Carter, musician
- Baron Davis, professional basketball player
- Terry Fator, ventriloquist
- Tony Hsieh, businessman
- Reggie Jackson, professional baseball player
- Hubert Keller, celebrity chef
- Maloof family, entrepreneurs and businessmen
- Floyd Mayweather Jr., professional boxer
- Anthony Marnell III, entrepreneur
- Joseph Otting, businessman
- George Parros, professional hockey player
- Sig Rogich, businessman
- Frank Thomas, professional baseball player
- Elaine Wynn, philanthropist and businesswoman
