= Vacation Village =

Defunct hotel and casino in the United States

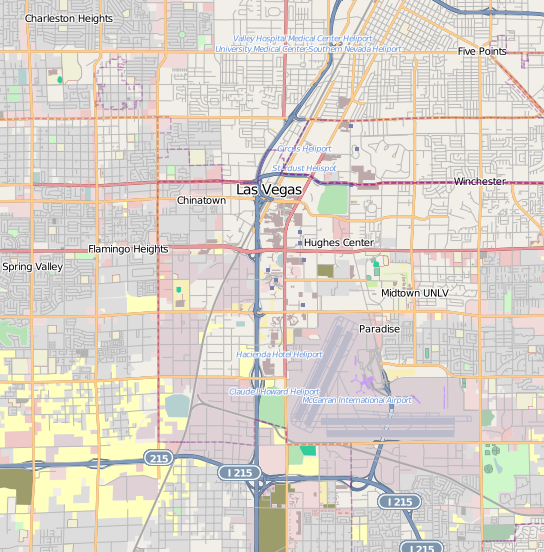
- Location within Las Vegas Boulevard Location within Nevada
- Interactive map of Vacation Village
- Location: Enterprise, Nevada; 6711 South Las Vegas Boulevard; 36.066865°N 115.17227°W
- Opened: November 9, 1990
- Closed: January 8, 2002 (casino); January 9, 2002 (hotel)
- Theme: Southwest
- No. of rooms: 315
- Gaming space: 15,000 sq ft (1,400 m^{2})
- Notable restaurants: Denny's
- Casino type: Land-based
- Renovated in: 1993, 1999–2000

Vacation Village was a hotel and casino located on 3 acres (1.2 ha) of land at 6711 South Las Vegas Boulevard in Enterprise, Nevada.

The Heers family initially purchased 25 acres (10 ha) of land in 1964, and planned to have a hotel and casino built on the property. Construction began on the Century Hotel in 1972, although the project ultimately became inactive. Construction resumed in 1988, and the property was opened as Vacation Village on November 9, 1990. The hotel-casino struggled through financial difficulties and various legal problems during its final years, and was eventually auctioned to millionaire Shawn Scott in 2001, after the Heers family failed to pay off a $19 million loan.

Vacation Village closed in January 2002, after a lease dispute between Scott and the Heers. Scott had considered expanding and redeveloping Vacation Village, although his plans did not materialize. The property was purchased by Turnberry Associates in January 2004, and Vacation Village was approved for demolition later that year. Since 2007, the southeastern portion of the Town Square shopping center has occupied the former land of Vacation Village.

== History ==
=== Early history (1964–2000) ===
In 1964, brothers Carol and Chuck Heers purchased 25 acres (10 ha) of land on Las Vegas Boulevard, south of Sunset Road, with the intention to construct a hotel and casino. In 1972, construction began on the Century Hotel. By 1974, only a portion of the building had been completed. Carol Heers gradually built the hotel and casino during subsequent years. In 1988, the Heers planned to expand the un-opened property to include three seven-story hotel towers, and five three-story towers, as well as a 47-foot-high casino building. Construction of the Vacation Village Hotel and Casino began in October 1988. C.E.H. Investments of Las Vegas was the developer, with construction expected to finish in spring 1989. At the start of construction, Vacation Village was to include 439 hotel rooms, nine restaurants, and approximately 45,000 sq ft (4,200 m^{2}) of casino and public space. The project had been inactive for years.

A fire occurred on the property, still under construction, during the early hours of December 27, 1989. As no water was available on the property, firefighters had to take water from the nearby McCarran International Airport. An entire two-story building on the property's east side was ordered for demolition due to the fire damage. The fire caused $1.2 million in damage and destroyed 72 units that were to be remodeled and opened as Vacation Village Apartments. Renovation work had not yet begun on the building. Arson was determined to be the cause of the fire.

Plans for the hotel towers were derailed in 1990 due to new height restrictions after a decision was made to expand the north runway at McCarran International Airport. The project was half-built at the time, and was redesigned so its buildings would not exceed 38 feet in height. Plans for an 80-foot sign were scrapped. The Federal Aviation Administration approved the redesign in June 1990. That month, the Nevada Gaming Control Board and the Nevada Gaming Commission approved the casino for a July opening. Ultimately, the southwestern-themed Vacation Village opened on November 9, 1990, on three acres of the 25-acre property. Vacation Village was located at 6711 South Las Vegas Boulevard, near Interstate 15. The property was considered part of the southern Las Vegas Strip.

In 1991, to maintain operations, the Heers family took a $10 million loan from Robert Hilt, a casino owner in Colorado. Two years later, the Heers family lost the hotel-casino to bankruptcy, as they could not refinance the property after its value declined due to the height restrictions. It was later determined that the property's value declined by $5.4 million because of the restrictions.

In January 1992, stunt performer Butch Laswell achieved a world record at Vacation Village for the highest motorcycle ramp-to-ramp aerial jump ever to be performed, at 41 feet high. In December 1995, Vacation Village received a Water Hero Award from Southern Nevada Coalition 2000 for its water conservation; Vacation Village was the first resort on the Las Vegas Strip to use desert landscaping, and also featured a controlled-water fountain, while each room was equipped with low-flow water products. Vacation Village briefly appears in the 1995 film, Beyond Desire. Three years later, Univision's television music series Caliente filmed scenes at the hotel's pool.

By April 1997, an expansion was being planned that would have included the addition of a three-story hotel tower, adding 652 hotel rooms. The expansion also would have added additional square footage to the casino, as well as additional restaurants, rental space, a movie theater, a laundry building, and a three-story parking garage. Carol Heers' company and the owner of Vacation Village, CEH Properties Limited, filed for Chapter 11 bankruptcy in October 1997.

Tim Heers, the son of Carol Heers, acquired Vacation Village in 1999, after previously leasing the property from his father's company. Tim Heers became the president of Vacation Village, as well as a major shareholder. In 1999, Vacation Village took a $19.4 million loan from Foothill Capital Corporation to pay off the earlier loan from Hilt.

=== Financial and legal problems (2000–2001) ===
In October 2000, Foothill Capital sued Vacation Village Inc. and its affiliate, Shangri La Limited, as well as five general partners of Shangri La. Foothill alleged that the two companies failed to repay the $19.4 million loan, which was secured by the hotel-casino and a shopping center owned by Shangri La. According to Foothill, $19.35 million was still owed.

On November 17, 2000, Vacation Village filed for Chapter 11 bankruptcy. Terri Heers Thompson, a 20-percent shareholder in Vacation Village, said the hotel-casino intended to pay off the $19 million loan within 60 to 90 days. Thompson also said Vacation Village had received approval to become a Holiday Inn franchise hotel. The hotel-casino was to be renamed the Holiday Inn Las Vegas after new financing was obtained and the property had been upgraded to meet the hotel chain's standards. The hotel, which had 315 rooms at the time, had received approval from Clark County to build up to 700 additional rooms. A timeshare development, consisting initially of 60 units and retaining the Vacation Village name, was also planned at that time. The hotel-casino also planned to add a bowling alley and 200 slot machines.

On December 4, 2000, Foothill filed a request to have Vacation Village's cash collateral secured, and requested an accounting of all money spent since the bankruptcy filing. Foothill claimed that after the bankruptcy filing, it notified Vacation Village of its objection to the hotel-casino's "unsupervised" use of cash collateral "without an appropriate offer of adequate protection." Foothill claimed that Vacation Village ignored numerous telephone calls and letters, and that it failed to receive court approval to use its cash collateral. Foothill feared that the money could be depleted rapidly with Vacation Village still in operation. Foothill also alleged that the hotel-casino had failed to provide numerous documents, which included monthly operating reports dating from August 2000 to November 2000. An attorney for Vacation Village denied the allegations, claiming that all documents had been provided and that Foothill "is trying to steal the property." Up to that point, Vacation Village had received numerous loan offers ranging from $25 million to $30 million. It was expected that the property would become a Holiday Inn in four to six months, with renovations projected to cost between $1 million and $2 million.

Later that month, Tim Heers claimed that two mortgage brokers had reneged on a deal to pay off the loan, resulting in Vacation Village's financial problems: "Remington Financial of Phoenix and Financial Solutions of New York are two mortgage brokers that took us to Foothill a year ago, and got us the $19 million loan. Remington told us if we put up a $35,000 deposit through them to a potential lender called Mee Corp., we would get an extension on our $19 million loan and a new loan through Mee Corp. But they lied. They didn't come through with the new loan." Foothill denied the claims. The property was appraised at $99 million in December 2000. At the time, it was believed that Vacation Village was located too far south on the Strip to attract tourists and that it was lacking the amenities to appeal to local residents, although Terri Heers Thompson said the hotel-casino generated an average monthly profit of $1.25 million.

In June 2001, Foothill Capital moved forward with plans to force a sale of the property and its gaming equipment in an auction, to recover its $19 million loan. That month, Vacation Village received a $35 million loan from Bank of Canton of California. From the loan, $24 million was to be used to pay off money owed to Foothill, while another $4 million was to be used to renovate the hotel to meet Holiday Inn requirements. The remaining $7 million was to be used to build a bowling center and 24 new guest suites.

In July 2001, Foothill sought court approval to appoint Eric Nelson Auctioneering to handle an auction of Vacation Village and its gaming equipment in the event that its owners fail to close the loan transaction. The $35 million loan soon became the center of a dispute when three California loan brokers claimed they were owed a brokers' fee of $3.4 million for locating Bank of Canton. A lawyer for Vacation Village stated that their commission agreement was invalid because the brokers were not licensed in Nevada. The $35 million loan, stalled partly because of these accusations, was declined. In August 2001, Tim Heers said the property was considering a $42 million loan from a new, unnamed potential lender. Vacation Village officials hoped to refinance the property before its auction, scheduled for November 2001.

In September 2001, Vacation Village alleged that Eric Nelson Auctioneering was not qualified to auction the hotel-casino, claiming it had a conflict of interest because it was a client of Gordon & Silver, a Las Vegas law firm that represented Foothill. Vacation Village also accused the auctioneer's broker, Eric Nelson, of being a competitor to the hotel-casino because he was the president of two Las Vegas gaming companies at the time, neither of which were licensed in Nevada or owned any gaming property in the state. Nelson denied having a conflict of interest. A U.S. Bankruptcy judge rejected Vacation Village's request to remove Nelson, and ordered the hotel-casino to cooperate with the auctioneering company. Vacation Village had been accused of threatening to take legal action against Eric Nelson Auctioneering if it proceeded with setting up the auction. Vacation Village also alleged that Nelson threatened to destroy the hotel-casino's business and its owners after he was told that it was trying to get a court ruling to remove him. Nelson denied these allegations, which Vacation Village withdrew the following week. At that time, several hotel owners, investors and gaming companies had become interested in the property because of its location and the potential to increase the hotel to 1,000 rooms.

Later in September 2001, Foothill said during a court hearing that Vacation Village had failed to comply with a court order to sign an auction agreement for the sale of the property in November. Foothill also said the hotel-casino failed to advance $50,000 for advertising costs to Eric Nelson Auctioneering, as well as failing to fully cooperate with the auctioneer's requests. An attorney for Vacation Village said the hotel-casino did not have money for advertising costs. However, various people related to the hotel-casino–including its owners, managing partners, and their family relatives–received what Foothill referred to as "unauthorized" payments without court approval or explanation, totaling $70,000 to $80,000 per month.

In October 2001, Vacation Village sued the Nevada Department of Transportation (NDOT) over a dispute regarding ownership of a 15-acre parcel–located between Sunset Road and the hotel-casino–that was sold to NDOT for use in a public highway. According to Vacation Village, plans to use the land for an off-ramp were abandoned around 1994. The land was subsequently transferred to the Clark County Department of Aviation in July 2001. Laura Fitzsimmons, an attorney for Vacation Village, said that the hotel-casino should be entitled to part of the land: "We want the court to decide who has rights to that property. That's important to us because Vacation Village can't build upwards due to height restrictions imposed by Clark County. And when you can't build upwards, you've got to build outwards."

=== Sale and closure (2001–2002) ===
On November 20, 2001, Vacation Village was sold in an auction for $17.8 million to Capital One LLC, owned by millionaire Shawn Scott. Scott had previously owned the Cheyenne hotel and casino, but relinquished his gaming license in 1997, after the Cheyenne was criticized for inadequate accounting practices. Scott had to rely on the Heers family to operate the casino. Scott planned to keep Vacation Village open for the short term while developing a long term plan for the property. Scott was expected to take over ownership on December 20, 2001. At that time, Scott had narrowed down his list of new potential casino operators to five candidates.

Vacation Village's casino had closed by 11:00 p.m. on January 8, 2002, while 66 guests were ordered to vacate the hotel by noon on the following day. Approximately 350 employees were laid off.

Prior to the closure, Scott and the Heers family were involved in a dispute regarding when Scott could take possession of the hotel-casino. Jim Norcott, a member of the hotel-casino's board of directors, said it closed as a result of failed lease negotiations between Scott and the Heers family. According to Norcott, Scott had agreed to let the Heers family lease the property on a month-to-month basis, but Scott's lawyer later told the family that Scott did not want to be involved. Norcott also claimed that Eric Nelson Auctioneering implied to the family that the hotel-casino would remain open until January 28, 2002. Scott denied Norcott's claims, saying he took possession of Vacation Village because a lease agreement could not be reached with the Heers; and because he felt the casino needed a stable gaming operator, citing the hotel-casino's recent problems.

A major reason for the closure was because Scott was in talks with two local gaming operators about a potential joint venture to redevelop the property, possibly under a new name. Scott had plans to increase the property to approximately 1,500 hotel rooms, and to add several new restaurants and more than 1,500 slot machines, as well as a movie theater. He also mentioned the possibility of selling the property.

By August 2002, the property had a prospective buyer who was to have a 10-year lease agreement with Holiday Inn, which planned to add approximately 700 additional hotel rooms to replace its rooms at the Boardwalk Hotel and Casino, which was no longer part of the hotel chain. Holiday Inn agreed to let Vacation Village use 60 of its new rooms as timeshares. Other plans included an underground 118-lane bowling alley, which would be the largest in the world. Horse racing or dog racing was also planned for a 70-acre vacant lot, owned by Howard Hughes Corporation and located north of Vacation Village.

In January 2004, the closed hotel-casino was sold for $25.5 million to Centra Properties and Turnberry Associates, which expected to demolish Vacation Village by the end of the year to make room for a retail center, which would ultimately open as Town Square in 2007. Demolition of Vacation Village was approved in November 2004.

== Features ==
The property's lodging consisted of a series of two-story motel buildings, painted adobe brown. The casino initially contained 400 slot machines and a new Mexican restaurant. A $75,000 renovation in 1993 added a 24-hour buffet and a 500-seat banquet room. As of 1994, Vacation Village featured the only graveyard buffet in Las Vegas. By 1995, Vacation Village's Western Barbeque Buffet had been remodeled and renamed as the Great China Buffet. A Denny's restaurant was added in February 1995. A new restaurant, Village Italian Cafe, opened in 1996. That year, Vacation Village was included in the Las Vegas Review-Journal's "Best of Las Vegas" awards for best video poker.

Between October 1999 and November 2000, Vacation Village was expanded to include two bars, a liquor store, a bingo hall, a race book, and a wedding chapel. At that time, it was one of only five casinos on the Las Vegas Strip to offer bingo. As of 2001, it included the southernmost sportsbook on the Las Vegas Strip, with the Mandalay Bay being the closest alternative. It was operated by Leroy's Horse & Sports Place. At the time of its closure, Vacation Village included a 15,000 sq ft (1,400 m^{2}) casino with 10 table games and 700 slot machines. Vacation Village had been known for its various coupon offers.
