= Southern Highlands, Nevada =

Coordinates: 35.9749°N 115.1939°W

Southern Highlands
- Planned Community within Enterprise, Nevada
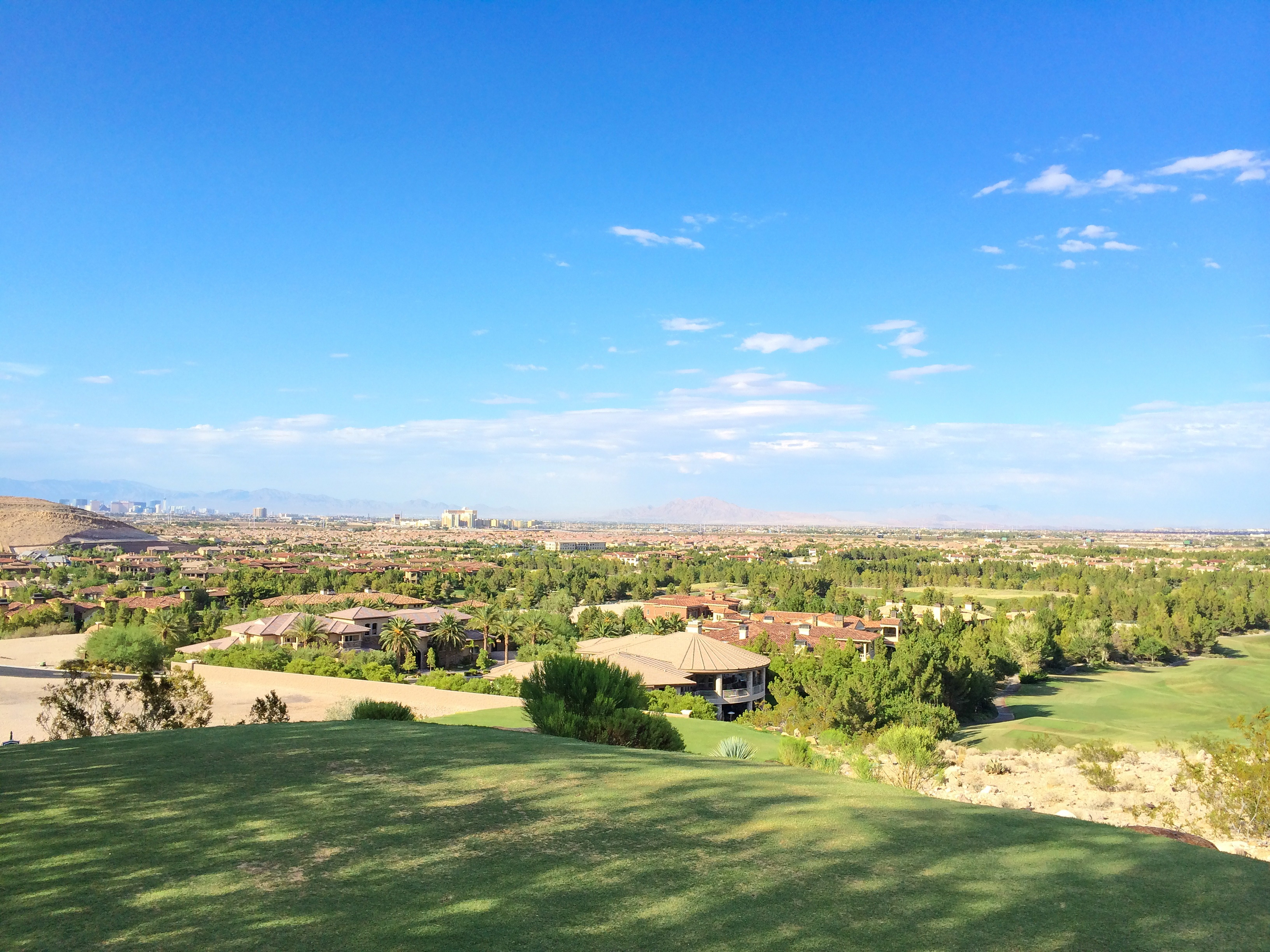
- Southern Highlands in 2016
- Interactive map of Southern Highlands
- Country: United States
- State: Nevada
- Counties: Clark
- Unincorporated town: Enterprise
- Area: Las Vegas Valley

Area
  - Total: 2,299 acres (930 ha)
- ZIP code: 89141
- Area code: 702
- Website: www.southernhighlands.com

Southern Highlands is a planned community in the southern foothills of the Las Vegas Valley. It is part of the unincorporated town of Enterprise, Nevada, United States.

Occupying approximately 2,299 acres (930 ha) of land, the community surrounds the Southern Highlands Golf Club, which is a separate neighborhood and private enclave. The masterplan community is generally bounded by Dean Martin Dr on the east, West Cactus Avenue on the north, South Jones Boulevard & Starr Hills Ave on the west, and New Providence Street on the south.

It contains a resort, two retail centers, recreational facilities, a private country club, spa, multiple parks, two medical centers, a private security department, a corporate center, and a fire station.

== History ==
In 1996, the Bureau of Land Management (BLM) was negotiating a property swap with the Arizona-based Olympic Group. Olympic Group completed the first phase of the BLM land exchange deal in October 1996, while the second phase was completed on April 26, 1997. The following month, the Clark County Commission gave tentative approval for Olympic Highlands, an 1,850-acre luxury master-planned community with a total of 6,000 to 8,000 homes. The development could also include casinos, offices, retail centers, and an industrial park. Olympic Group hoped to break ground in late 1997. The community would be located south of the Las Vegas Strip at the southern end of the Las Vegas Valley. The property was bordered by Cactus Avenue to the north, Jones Boulevard to the west, Interstate 15 and St. Rose Parkway to the east, and Larson Lane to the south. The community was expected to have a population of approximately 17,500 people.

The project would mark Olympic Group's first large-scale community development. As a requirement before final approval, Olympic Group was requested to submit a financial analysis of the impact that the community would have on public services. The study would examine the effect that Olympic Highlands would have on roads, schools, fire protection, and other public services. Olympic also agreed to spend more than $150 million in public service improvements, which would include donating land for parks and schools, and upgrading the nearby I-15/Lake Mead interchange. Nearby residents were concerned about how the project would affect their horse ranches, mountain views, and night sky clarity. In July 1997, the Clark County Commission declined to hold public hearings on the project until the completion of the fiscal impact statement. By November 1998, the project's name had been changed to Southern Highlands, due to concerns from the United States Olympic & Paralympic Committee, which was known for protecting the rights to its name.

The community includes the Southern Highlands Golf Club, which opened in 1999. The community also has its own 24-hour security patrol.

In 2003, construction began on the $30 million, 21-acre Southern Highlands Marketplace. The community's first office space, a three-story building, was under construction in 2004. As of 2005, the community had approximately 7,000 homes, and had been approved for up to 10,400.

In 2005, Olympic Gaming proposed the Southern Highlands hotel-casino resort, to be built adjacent to the community. The $1 billion project was scheduled to begin construction in 2007, and would have included a 300,000 sq ft (28,000 m^{2}) shopping mall, the Gallery Southern Highlands. Because of uncertainty in the financial markets, the project was delayed in August 2007, and ultimately cancelled.

The Olympia Sports Park opened in August 2018.

== Demographics ==
It has a median household income of $138,134 and an average household net worth of $819,866.

== Schools ==
- Southern Highlands Preparatory School, a private, university preparatory elementary and middle school that opened in August 2003.
- Charles and Phyllis Frias Elementary School
- Dennis Ortwein Elementary School
- Evelyn Stuckey Elementary School
- Lois and Jerry Tarkanian Middle School (located outside of Southern Highlands)
- Desert Oasis High School (located outside of Southern Highlands)

=== Other programs ===
- Boys and Girls Club of Southern Nevada

== Notable people ==
Notable residents of Southern Highlands include the following:

- Marc-André Fleury, professional ice hockey goaltender
- Dave Aron, music producer
- DJ Ashba, musician, producer
- Marc Badain, businessman and football executive
- Bobby Baldwin, professional poker player, casino executive
- Toni Braxton, musician
- Tom Cable, professional football coach
- Ben Carey, musician
- Derek Carr, football quarterback
- Chris Carter, professional baseball player
- Nick Carter, musician
- Calvin Collins, professional football player
- Baron Davis, professional basketball player
- Jordan Farmar, professional basketball player
- Terry Fator, ventriloquist
- Clelin Ferrell, professional football player
- Charles Frias, businessman and philanthropist
- Tyson Fury, professional boxer
- Jon Gruden, former head coach of the Las Vegas Raiders
- Tony Hsieh, businessman
- Reggie Jackson, professional baseball player
- Penn Jillette, magician
- Colin Kaepernick, civil rights activist and football quarterback
- Hubert Keller, celebrity chef
- Lon Kruger, professional basketball coach
- Holly Madison, reality television star
- Gavin Maloof, entrepreneur and businessman
- Floyd Mayweather Jr., professional boxer
- Conor McGregor, professional MMA fighter
- Anthony Marnell III, entrepreneur
- Marvin Menzies, UNLV basketball coach
- Kolton Miller, professional football player
- Brent Musburger, sportscaster
- Ray Muzyka, entrepreneur
- Kevin Na, professional golfer
- Mark O'Meara, professional golfer
- Shaquille O'Neal, professional basketball player
- Joseph Otting, businessman
- George Parros, professional hockey player
- Norman Powell, professional basketball player
- Ron Rivera, analyst for ESPN
- Rudy Ruettiger, motivational speaker and Notre Dame football player
- Lori Rogich, state senator
- Sig Rogich, businessman
- Rob Roy, CEO of Switch
- Andrew Sasson, entrepreneur & hotelier
- Anthony Simmons, professional football player
- Mark Stone, professional ice hockey player
- Dennis Swanson, CEO of Lamps Plus
- Frank Thomas, professional baseball player
- Lisa Vanderpump, businesswoman and television personality
- Hans-Peter Wild, billionaire businessman and lawyer
- Elaine Wynn, philanthropist and businesswoman
