= Sebastijan Pečjak =

Slovenian darts player

Personal information
- Born: July 27, 1976 Slovenia
- Died: 6 July 2012 (aged 35) Ljubljana, Slovenia

Sport
- Sport: Darts
- Playing since: 1993
- Laterality: Right-handed

Organisation (see split in darts)
- BDO: 2005
- PDC: 2009–2011

WDF major events – best performances
- World Masters: Last 192: 2005

Other tournament wins
- Tournament: Years
- Soft Tip Bullshooter World Championship: 2009

Sebastijan Pečjak (27 July 1976–6 July 2012) was a Slovenian darts player who was most notable for representing Slovenia at the 2010 PDC World Cup of Darts along with teammate Osmann Kijamet. They lost to Sweden in the first round.

Pečjak won the Soft Tip Bullshooter World Championship in 2009. In the same year, he reached the last 32 of the German Darts Championship.

Pečjak died on 6 July 2012, after a motorcycle accident in Ljubljana.
