= One Queensridge Place =

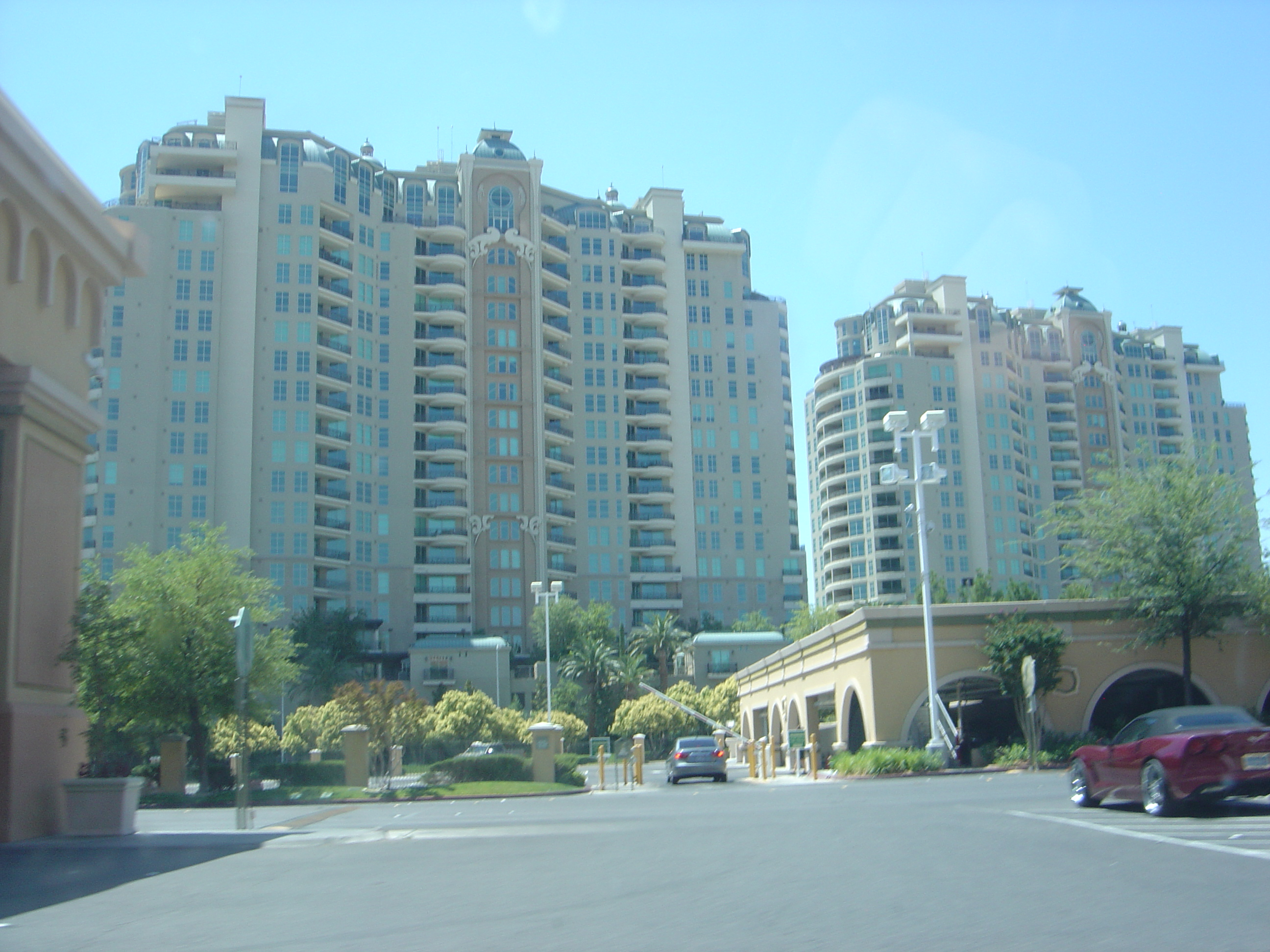
- One Queensridge Place

- Location within Nevada

General information
- Type: Residential
- Location: Las Vegas, Nevada USA
- Coordinates: 36.1663°N 115.2945°W
- Construction started: 2005
- Completed: 2007

Height
- Roof: 234 ft (71 m)
- Top floor: 20

Technical details
- Floor count: 20

Design and construction
- Architecture firm: JMA Architecture Studios
- Developer: Executive Home Builders
- Main contractor: Perini Building Company

Other information
- Number of units: 219

Website
- www.queensridgeplace.com

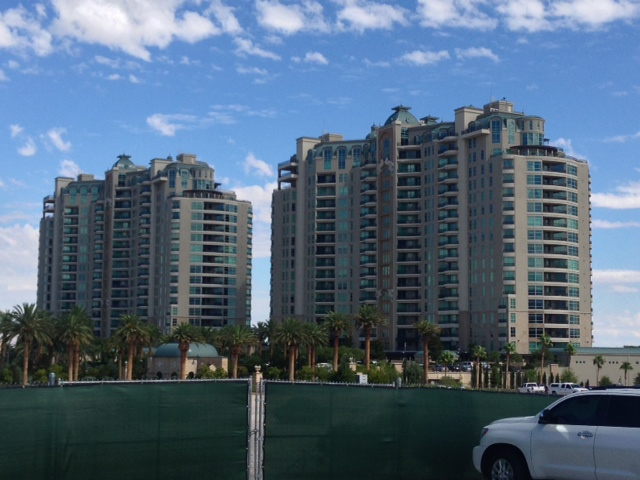
One Queensridge Place in 2013.

One Queensridge Place is the name given to two residential skyscrapers located on the west side of the Las Vegas Valley in the Queensridge neighborhood adjacent to the master planned community of Summerlin, Nevada. Construction began in 2005 and concluded in 2007. The buildings are twins, measuring approximately 233.5 feet (71.2 m) high. Each tower has 20 constructed floors with curtain wall facades and distinctive architecture. The resulting large windows allow for views of the Las Vegas Strip and Red Rock Canyon.

== History ==
The project was originally announced as Versailles in March 1998, to be constructed on 14.5 acres of land adjacent to Summerlin's Badlands Golf Course, near the southwest corner of Rampart Boulevard and Alta Drive.

The project would consist of three 12-story towers with a total of 84 condominium units in 10 different floor plans, ranging in size from 3,000 square feet to 13,000 square feet, with prices between $1.1 million and $7.7 million. The project would have offered full-time security, concierge and valet service, a spa, a ballroom, and access to the nearby golf course.

Construction, to be handled by Taurus Development – a Canada-based international real estate developer – was to begin in May 1998, and was scheduled to be completed 14 months later. Five other companies were involved in the project's development, including Peccole Nevada Corporation, which provided part of the property for the project.

Condo units for Versailles had gone on sale by April 1999. Taurus Development planned to begin construction the following month, with an expected completion date of early 2001. In December 2000, Peccole Nevada announced that Taurus Development was no longer involved with the project, which Peccole Nevada still planned to construct with a different development team. At that time, Peccole Nevada was also preparing to develop a separate resort on nearby land that would consist of 300 fractional timeshare-like units.

A new project was announced in July 2004, as Queensridge Towers. At that time, it was to consist of three 18-story towers and one 14-story tower, with a total of 385 condominium units at an average of 3,850 square feet. The smallest units would be in the 2,000 square-foot range, while eight of the largest units would be 13,000 square feet. The average price for a unit would be $1 million. The first phase of construction – two 18-story towers – began in April 2005, with the project now named One Queensridge Place. The project, developed by Peccole Nevada and Executive Home Builders, was designed by JMA Architecture Studios, while Perini Building Company served as the general contractor. In November 2005, IDB Development Corporation joined the project as an investment partner.

In January 2006, the project received a $250 million construction loan from HSBC. At that time, Perini Building had finished the eighth floor of one tower and the ninth floor of the other tower, which would contain a combined total of 219 units. The towers were topped off in May 2006. As of February 2007, the project was 85 percent sold. Construction had finished by September 2007. The first residents were expected to begin occupying the building early that month.

In October and November 2007, One Queensridge Place was cited for water waste by the Las Vegas Valley Water District, which was unaware that a fountain on the property was part of its cooling tower augmentation unit. The water district had banned commercial fountains in 2003, because of a drought. The water district later decided not to fine the property after being informed that the fountain was part of the buildings' cooling system. Engineers believed the cooling system would generate energy savings of 10 to 12 percent for the property.

In April 2009, the 219-unit property had only sold six condo units in the past six months because of a recession. To increase sales, the next 10 units were to be sold at a discount of 25 to 50 percent. Prices usually started at $900,000 for a 2,000-square-foot unit. In February 2010, One Queensridge Place had gone a year without selling a condominium unit; 85 units remained unsold, and eight were in default. Singer Pia Zadora purchased a $2 million condo unit at One Queensridge Place in May 2010. By November 2010, 138 condo sales had closed. Sales had improved by April 2013.

One Queensridge Place was built at a cost of $400 million. The property's artisans were inspired by landmarks such as Champs-Élysées in Paris, the Parthenon in Athens, and the Trevi Fountain in Rome. One Queensridge Place contains four two-story penthouses, two on each tower. Each penthouse is 16,000 square feet; one sold in 2019 for $8 million, a Las Vegas record at the time. The property's 20-acre site is approved for two additional towers and a total of 400 units.
