= Saipin Chutima =

Chef and restaurateur in Las Vegas, Nevada

- Born: 1954 or 1955 (age 70–71); Thailand
- Culinary career
- Cooking style: Northern Thai cuisine
- Current restaurant: Lotus of Siam
- Award won: James Beard Award for Best Chef Southwest (2011)

Saipin Chutima (born 1954 or 1955) is a chef and restaurateur in Las Vegas, Nevada. She is the chef at Lotus of Siam. In 2011 she was the co-winner of the James Beard Award for Best Chef Southwest.

== Early life ==
Chutima is from Chiang Mai, Thailand, where she was raised by her grandparents, who were farmers and merchants. She immigrated to Los Angeles in 1987, then moved to Las Vegas.

== Career ==
Chutima and her husband opened Lotus of Siam in 1999. Her recipes are based on traditional recipes passed down by her grandmother.

== Recognition ==
Gourmet named Lotus of Siam the best Thai restaurant in the United States.

In 2011 Chutima was the co-winner of the James Beard Award for Best Chef Southwest. According to Jonathan Gold she was "the first Asian-born chef to win a Beard award for cooking the cuisine of her homeland".

== Personal life ==
Chutima is married to Suchay, also called Bill, whom she met when she was 17 at his grandmother's restaurant. The couple has two daughters. Her husband and daughters help run the restaurant.
