= Las Vegas Ballpark =

Baseball stadium in Summerlin, Nevada

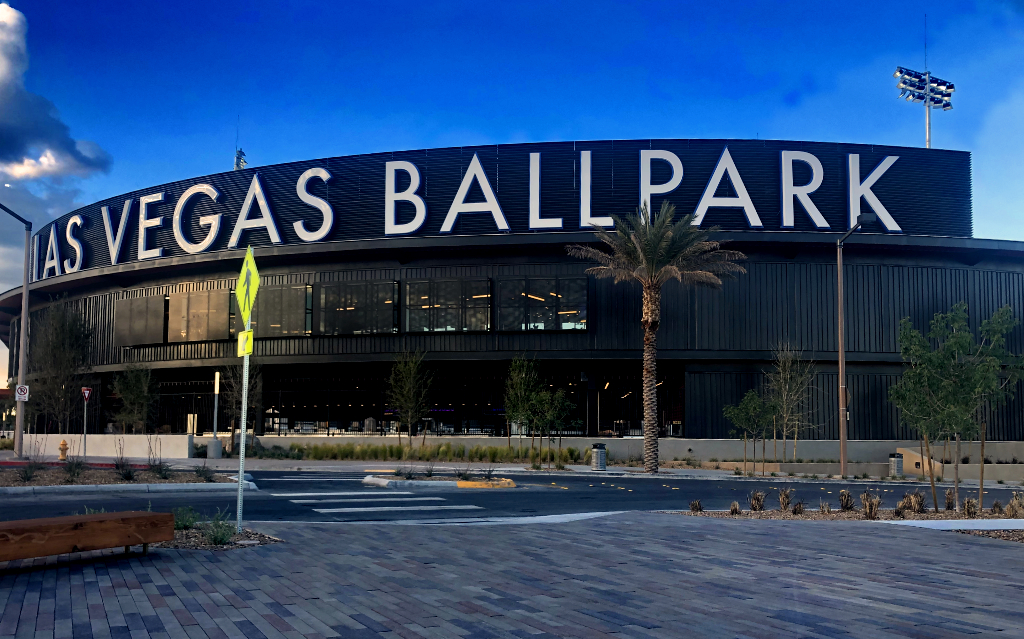

- Location in Nevada Location in the United States Location in North America
- Interactive map of Las Vegas Ballpark
- Address: 1650 South Pavilion Center Drive
- Location: Summerlin South, Nevada, U.S.
- Coordinates: 36°09′08.2″N 115°19′45.9″W
- Owner: Seaport Entertainment Group
- Operator: Las Vegas Aviators
- Capacity: 8,196, 10,000 standing
- Surface: Bandera bermuda grass
- Record attendance: 12,111 (May 14, 2019) Las Vegas Aviators vs. Tacoma Rainiers
- Field size: Left field: 340 ft (100 m); Left-center field: 380 ft (120 m); Center field: 415 ft (126 m); Right-center field: 380 ft (120 m); Right field: 340 ft (100 m)
- Acreage: 7.65 acres (3.10 ha)
- Public transit: RTC Transit Downtown Summerlin Transit Facility

Construction
- Groundbreaking: February 23, 2018; 8 years ago
- Opened: April 6, 2019; 7 years ago
- Cost: US$150 million ($189 million in 2025 dollars)
- Architect: HOK
- Structural engineer: Thornton Tomasetti
- Services engineers: M–E Engineers, Inc.
- General contractor: Hunt/PENTA

Tenant
- Las Vegas Aviators (PCL) 2019–present

Website
- www.thelvballpark.com

Las Vegas Ballpark is a baseball stadium in Summerlin South, Nevada, United States. It is the home field for the Las Vegas Aviators of the Pacific Coast League, who are currently affiliated with the Athletics. The stadium, along with its primary tenant, is owned by Seaport Entertainment Group. Las Vegas Ballpark is located in Downtown Summerlin near the intersection of South Pavilion Center Drive and Summerlin Center Drive next to City National Arena and across the street from the Downtown Summerlin shopping center. Construction of the $150 million stadium began in 2018 and was completed in time for the Aviators' 2019 season. It replaced the team's previous home at Cashman Field, where the Aviators had resided since 1983 as the Stars and 51s, respectively.

== History ==
=== Background ===
The decision to build a new stadium for the team, then known as the 51s, came on the back of many issues both the 51s and Minor League Baseball had with the team's previous stadium, Cashman Field. Considered state-of-the-art when it opened in 1983, it had fallen far behind the times. Players and staff criticized the facility noting poor conditions in the playing surface, bullpens, and clubhouse. The weight room was smaller when compared to other Triple-A stadiums, with infielder Ty Kelly calling it "basically just a room... not an actual weight room". The batting cage was also a point of concern for the players; it was a single lane and only accessible by walking out of the clubhouse to the parking lot. Johnny Monell described the cage as making him feel like he was "back in high school again," not one level below the major leagues. During a 51s game on August 22, 2015, the stadium sewage system backed up, causing raw sewage to flow into the dugouts. The smell was so strong that players were forced to watch the rest of the game from chairs on the field. Team president and chief operating officer Don Logan said, "It's disappointing that Vegas has the worst facility in our league when we have such a great town with the greatest hotels, the greatest dining, the greatest shopping. It's not becoming of this community to have a place like this."

Pacific Coast League commissioner Branch Barrett Rickey expressed his concerns about the feasibility of the continuous usage of Cashman Field as a Triple-A ballpark. In a letter to the Las Vegas Convention and Visitors Authority which owned and operated the facility, he wrote that Cashman Field had long since reached the end of its useful life, and a number of MLB teams had opted to place their Triple-A teams "in far less appropriate markets" than Las Vegas. He added that Cashman Field needed "many tens of millions of dollars" to keep it at something approaching Triple-A standards, and even those would not have been enough to make it "an optimal long-term solution" as a Triple-A venue. For much of the time since the San Diego Padres ended their 18-year affiliation with what was then known as the Las Vegas Stars in 2000, Las Vegas had been considered an affiliate of last resort for most MLB teams, something Las Vegas Ballpark sought to fix.

=== Potential MLB Use ===
Although built for Triple-A baseball, the stadium was designed in such a manner as to be usable on a temporary basis for Major League Baseball. In 2023, the Oakland Athletics' relocation to Las Vegas was unanimously approved by MLB owners. The Athletics could have played at Las Vegas Ballpark until the new 33,000-seat ballpark on the Las Vegas Strip is completed, however they ultimately chose to play at Sutter Health Park in West Sacramento, California, instead. The summer heat in an open air stadium, losing television rights to the San Francisco Bay Area, and wanting to make a bigger introduction into the Southern Nevada market were mentioned by Athletics president Dave Kaval as reasons to not select Las Vegas Ballpark as a temporary home. There may be some regular season Athletics games which are played in Las Vegas, depending on scheduling and weather. On August 26, 2025, MLB announced that the Athletics will play regular-season games at Las Vegas Ballpark in 2026 against the Milwaukee Brewers on June 8–10 and the Colorado Rockies on June 12–14 (The Athletics previously played in Las Vegas during the 1996 season when the Oakland Coliseum was being renovated at the time, albeit at Cashman Field).

=== Approval and groundbreaking ===
In April 2013, the team was purchased by Summerlin Las Vegas Baseball Club LLC, a joint venture of Howard Hughes Corp. and Play Ball Owners Group, including investors Steve Mack, Bart Wear and Chris Kaempfer, with intentions of moving it to a new stadium in Summerlin. In October 2017, the Las Vegas Convention and Visitors Authority approved a 20-year, $80 million naming rights agreement to help pay for the 10,000-seat ballpark.

The official groundbreaking was held on February 13, 2018. By April 2018, excavation was 85 percent complete with nearby grading for parking lots about 90 percent complete. By June 2018, it was on schedule to be completed before the 2019 season.

=== Opening ===
Reservations for tickets began in July 2018. The schedule was announced in August 2018, with the home opener on April 9, 2019. On April 6, the stadium had a soft opening hosting a NIAA Sunset 4A Region high school baseball game between Palo Verde High School and Centennial. The Aviators formally opened the ballpark with a 10–2 win against the Sacramento River Cats on April 9 before a sellout crowd of 11,036. Las Vegas secured the win with a five-run second inning in which Skye Bolt scored the eventual winning run when he came home on a fielding error. Aviators pitchers Chris Bassitt and Daniel Mengden combined to strikeout 14 Sacramento batters. The first home run in ballpark history was hit by Zach Green of the Sacramento River Cats on April 11 in the top of the eighth inning. In the same game, Sean Murphy hit the first Aviators' home run in ballpark history in the bottom of the eighth inning.

== Amenities and layout ==
Las Vegas Ballpark includes 22 suites, 400 club-level seats and 350 party deck seats, a center field pool, kids' zone, and several bars. The ballpark features about 8,200 breathable mesh seats manufactured by 4Topps Premium Seating, in order to account for the extreme heat often encountered during the summer months. It is the first stadium in sports history with all seats made from breathable mesh. The frames of these seats contain fiberglass, which has since delaminated causing skin irritation to some spectators. The ballpark's total seating capacity is 8,196, and it can accommodate 10,000 total fans. There is a concourse that wraps around the playing field. The field is recessed below the street-level concourse so it can be viewed from the entrances and seats.

Las Vegas Ballpark has the largest video board in minor league baseball at 3,930 square feet (365 m^{2}). The Daktronics video board is 31 feet (9.4 m) high by 126 feet (38 m) wide and features a 13 HD pixel layout. There are LED ribbon boards installed on the facings of each side of the upper deck; these are used to display the inning, score, count, and advertisements. The stadium also has indoor batting cages, a weight room and a rehabilitation center. The bullpen for each team is in right field. The park dimensions are 340 feet (100 m) to right and left field, and 380 feet (120 m) to left-center and 415 feet (126 m) to center. The home run wall, with the exception of left field where the wall is 14 feet (4.3 m) high, is 10 feet (3.0 m) high.

== See also ==
- New Las Vegas Stadium, the future home of the Athletics
- Allegiant Stadium, the home of the National Football League's Las Vegas Raiders and NCAA's UNLV Rebels football
- Michelob Ultra Arena, the home of the Women's National Basketball Association's Las Vegas Aces
- T-Mobile Arena, the home of the National Hockey League's Vegas Golden Knights
- Sports in the Las Vegas metropolitan area

Events and tenants
Preceded by Cashman Field	Home of the Las Vegas Aviators; 2019–present	Succeeded by Current
