= Downtown Summerlin =

Development in Summerlin, Nevada, US

Coordinates: 36.152077°N 115.330809°W

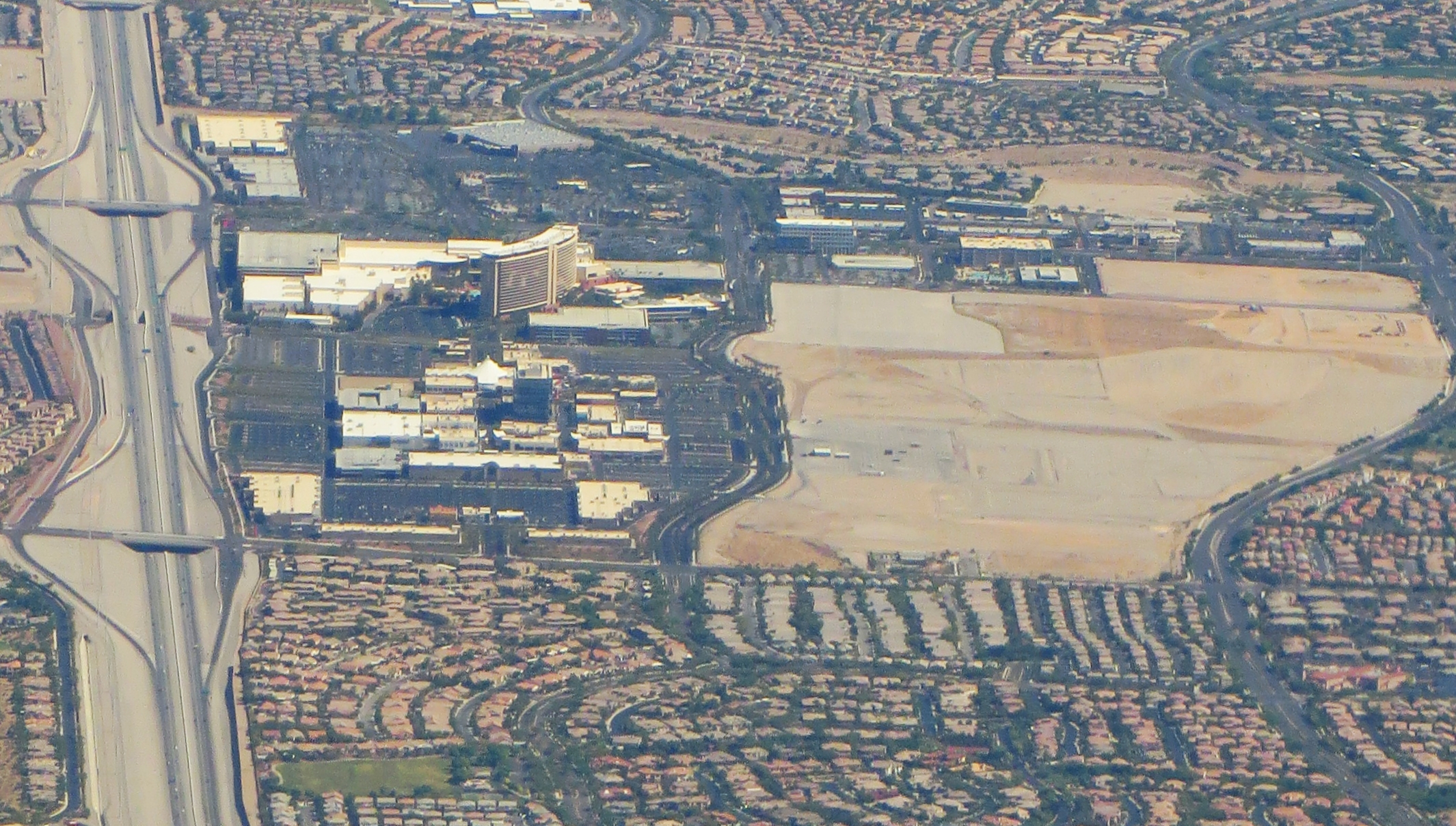
Looking north at Downtown Summerlin, seen here in 2015 across the center image, including undeveloped land

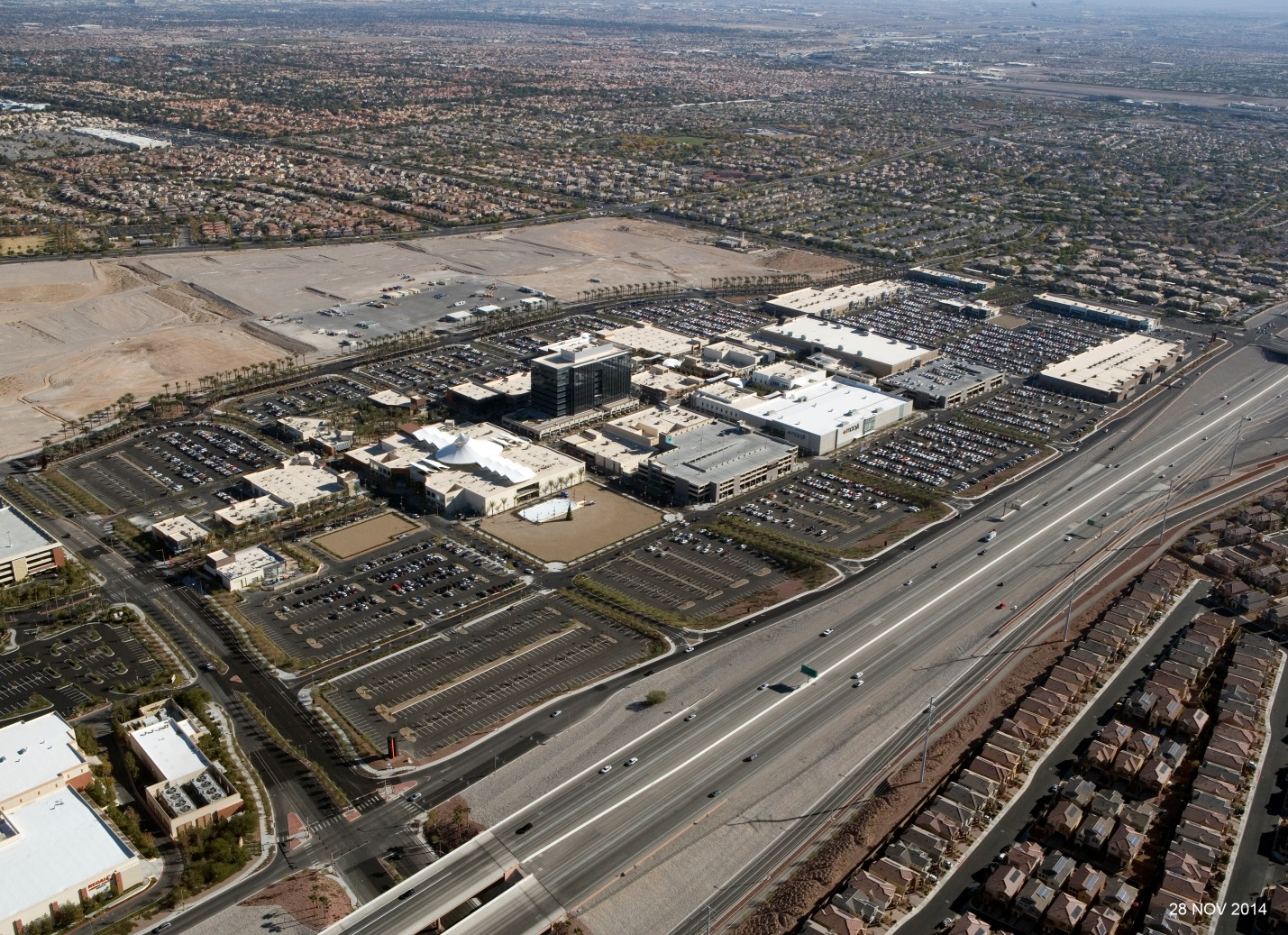
Looking southeast over Downtown Summerlin's shopping center, 2015

Downtown Summerlin is a 400-acre (160 ha) mixed-use development in Summerlin, Nevada, a suburban area on the western outskirts of Las Vegas. It includes the Downtown Summerlin shopping center, office space, and several apartment properties. Downtown Summerlin was developed by The Howard Hughes Corporation, which also developed the Summerlin community.

Planning for the mixed-use project was underway in the late 1990s. The project's first structure was the Red Rock Resort, developed by Station Casinos. It eventually opened in April 2006, after two years of construction. It would be followed by a bank building in 2007 and a Life Time Fitness gym in 2011.

General Growth Properties purchased Howard Hughes in 2004 and took over the site's undeveloped acreage. Construction of the shopping center and other components was delayed in 2008, due to financial problems. Howard Hughes took over the project again in 2010 and resumed work three years later, opening the retail center in October 2014. The first residential property was opened two years later.

City National Arena, the team headquarters for the Vegas Golden Knights NHL franchise and the UNLV Rebels hockey program, opened at Downtown Summerlin in 2017. The Las Vegas Ballpark, home of the Las Vegas Aviators minor league baseball team, opened in 2019.

Downtown Summerlin is located in the community of Summerlin South, Nevada, in a village known as Summerlin Centre, which is bordered by Charleston Boulevard to the north, Sahara Avenue to the south, Hualapai Way to the east and Desert Foothills Drive to the west. Downtown Summerlin's north and south boundaries are the same, but it is bordered by the 215 Beltway to the west and Town Center Drive to the east. Aside from being located in the middle of Summerlin Centre, Downtown Summerlin was also once planned under the name "Summerlin Centre".

== History ==
The Howard Hughes Corporation began planning Summerlin, Nevada in the late 1980s, along with plans to build a town center, which would ultimately become the village of Summerlin Centre. Tom Warden, vice president of community relations for Howard Hughes Corporation, said the village of Summerlin Centre would be "the center of Summerlin geographically, as well as many other ways. It will be the center of entertainment, business, retail, culture and education." The town center would include a shopping mall, office space, and a casino resort, as well as movie theaters and restaurants. The mixed-use project would be developed by The Rouse Company and its subsidiary, The Howard Hughes Corporation. Development of the Summerlin Centre village was underway in 1999. The village was expected to take five years to complete, with the mall scheduled to open in 2004.

By the end of 2003, the upcoming Red Rock Resort by Station Casinos was intended as the centerpiece of a planned downtown Summerlin area, also known, at the time, as Summerlin Centre. The center would include the proposed mall – rescheduled to open in 2006 or 2007 – as well as office and residential components. A groundbreaking ceremony was held for the Red Rock Resort on April 15, 2004; it opened two years later. Other projects at the mixed-use site included a bank building, opened in 2007; and a Life Time Fitness gym, opened in 2011.

During 2004, General Growth Properties (GGP) had purchased The Rouse Company and its Howard Hughes subsidiary. In May 2006, GGP announced details regarding the 400-acre mixed-use project, which would feature 1,200,000 sq ft (110,000 m^{2}) of retail space, including four anchor stores. Other planned features of Summerlin Centre included restaurants; office space; a 250-room, 11-story hotel; and at least 5,500 residences, ranging from houses to condominiums. GGP planned to begin construction of these facilities in spring 2007, with a grand opening scheduled for fall 2008. Construction on the mall portion was stopped in 2008, as GGP was experiencing financial difficulties amid the Great Recession. Construction of an office building was also halted.

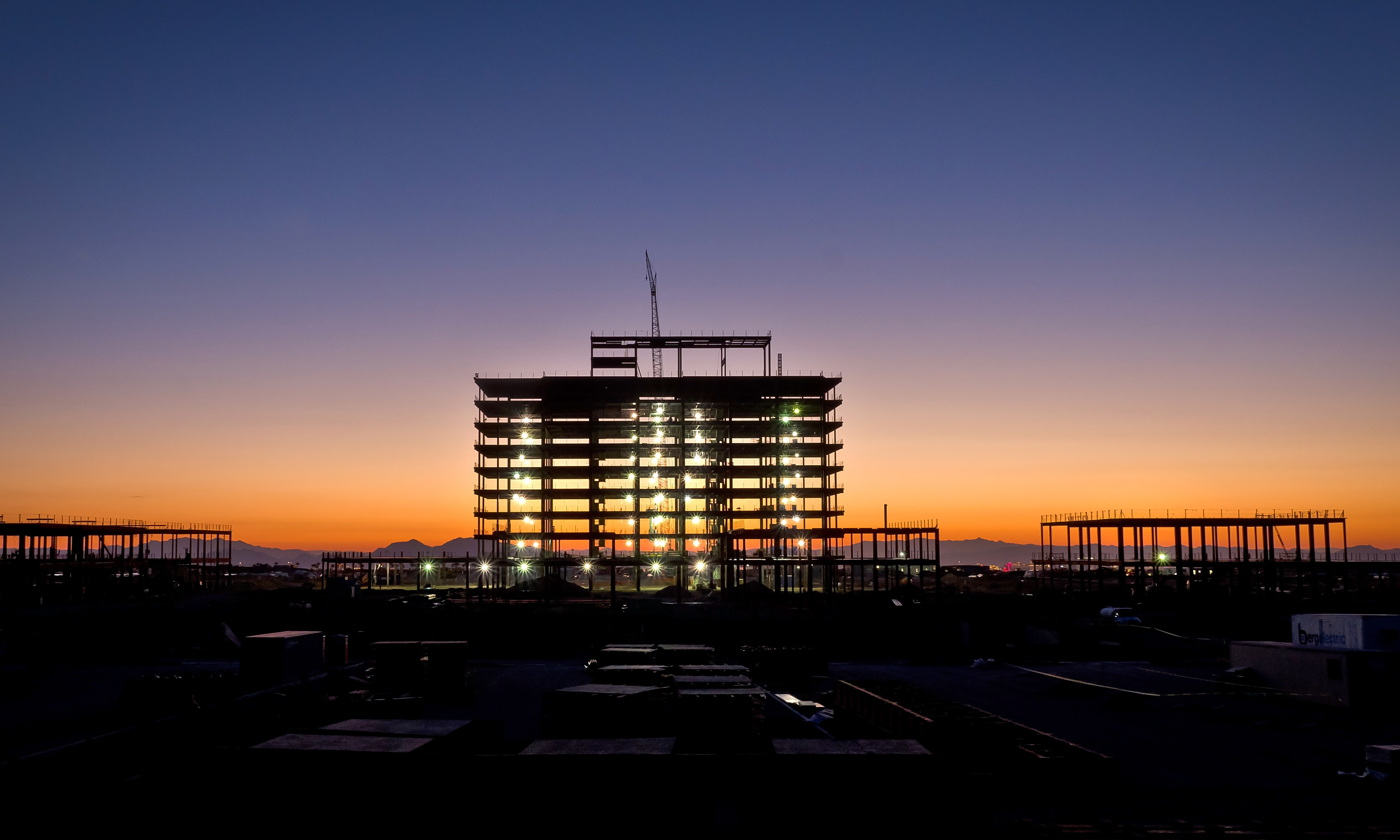
One Summerlin office building (center) and surrounding mall buildings during construction, October 2013

The Howard Hughes Corporation took over the mixed-use project in 2010. The company developed plans for the east half of the 400-acre parcel, including residential, office, and entertainment space, as well as a baseball stadium. The Howard Hughes Corporation resumed construction of the mixed-use project in July 2013, and renamed it from Summerlin Centre to Downtown Summerlin. The mall component, once known as The Shops at Summerlin, was touted as the beginning of the Downtown Summerlin project, although several buildings had already existed on-site, including the Red Rock resort, the bank building, and the fitness center.

The final cost of Downtown Summerlin, including the Red Rock Resort and future development, was expected to total at least $1 billion. Howard Hughes Corporation added traffic lights and sidewalks in one area to provide nearby residents with easy pedestrian access to Downtown Summerlin and the Red Rock Resort. Both businesses were expected to benefit from one another. The resort also underwent a $35 million renovation that was timed to coincide with the opening of the Downtown Summerlin shopping center.

=== Shopping center ===
The Downtown Summerlin shopping center opened on October 9, 2014, with 85 of its 125 stores ready for business. Additional stores were scheduled to open in the coming months. The shopping center also includes various restaurants and a Regal Cinemas movie theater. The shopping center is located on 106 acres (43 ha), and had 2,000 employees at the time of its opening. The retail component was considered the first phase of Downtown Summerlin, while the second phase would consist of a residential component.

=== Office space ===
Construction of a six-story office building began in October 2005, and was completed two years later. Known as the City National Bank Building, it includes 150,000 sq ft (14,000 m^{2}) of space. A shooting occurred at the building in 2024, leaving three dead, including the shooter.

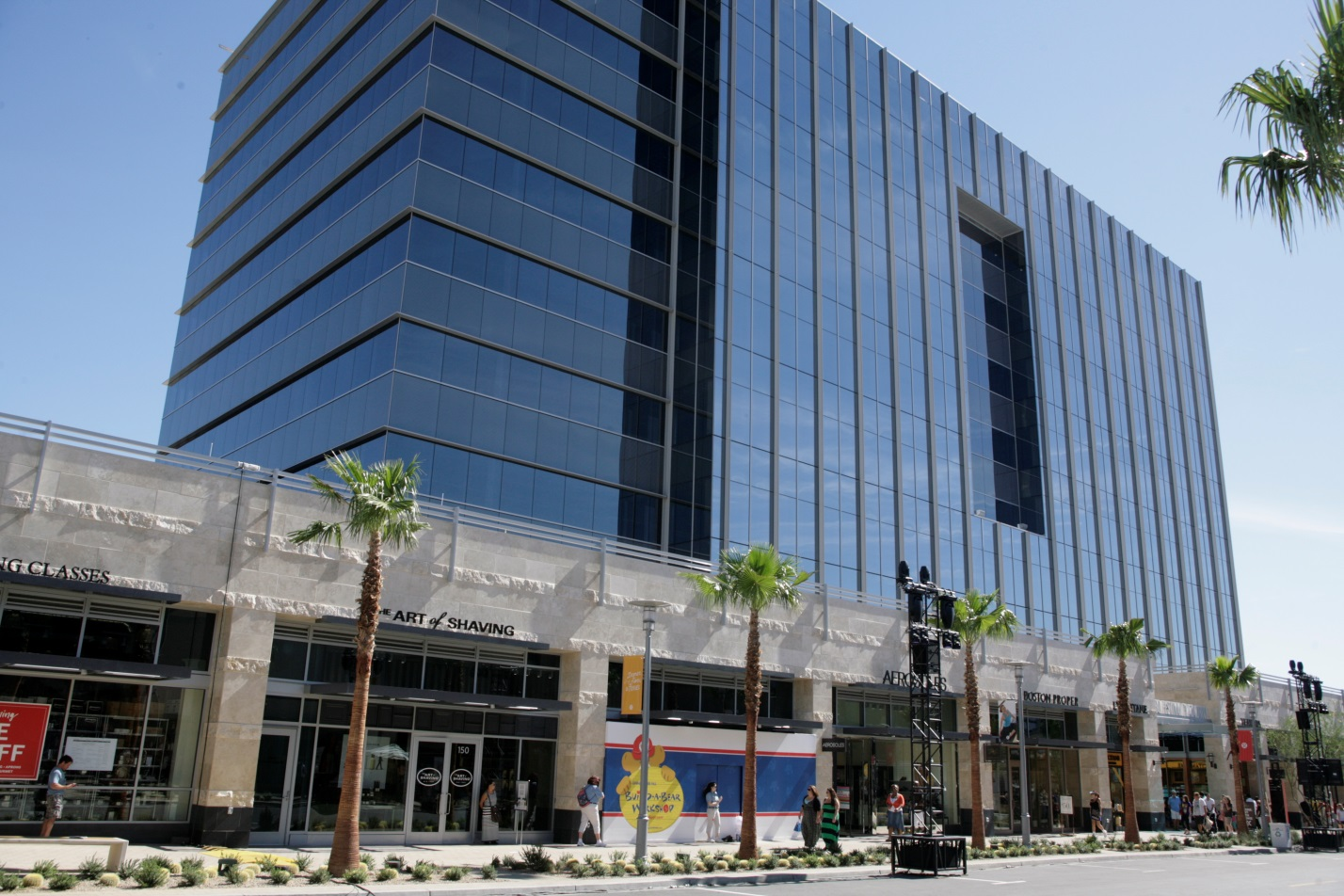
One Summerlin

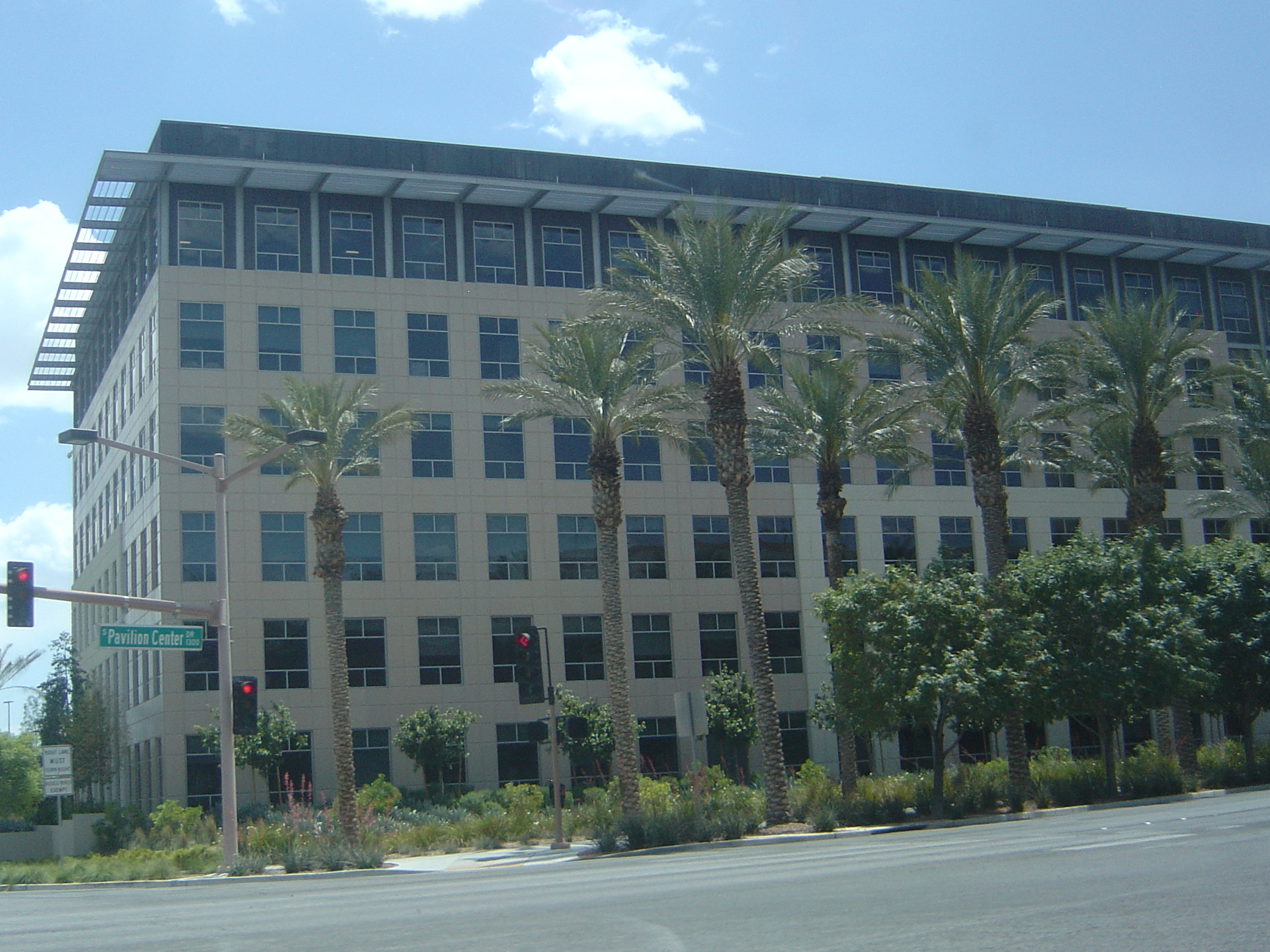
Two Summerlin

One Summerlin, a LEED-certified, nine-story office building, opened at Downtown Summerlin in April 2015. It includes 200,000 sq ft (19,000 m^{2}) of Class A office space. According to Howard Hughes CEO David Weinreb, One Summerlin is what makes Downtown Summerlin a "downtown," saying, "There was never a question that we needed to build the office building to really ground it as a downtown." The tower is located within the shopping center. The ground floor contains retail space, while the remaining floors are dedicated to office tenants. The tower's first office tenant, BusinesSuites, signed up to occupy approximately 16,000 sq ft (1,500 m^{2}) of space in May 2014. Other office tenants have included Fox Rothschild and Ballard Spahr. Some tenants in the building received discounted memberships to the TPC at Summerlin golf course, making it the only office tower in the Las Vegas Valley to do so.

By December 2016, Howard Hughes Corporation was planning to add another office tower. Two Summerlin, a six-story Class A office building with 145,000 sq ft (13,500 m^{2}), was opened in August 2018. The building cost $49 million, and is located on Downtown Summerlin's east parcel, across from the Red Rock Resort. The Howard Hughes Corporation relocated its headquarters to Two Summerlin in July 2019. Other major tenants have included Greenberg Traurig, CliftonLarsonAllen, and WeWork.

In 2021, construction began on another office building known as 1700 Pavilion. The 10-story building was constructed on three acres, located south of the Las Vegas Ballpark. Howard Hughes Corporation had previously planned a 14-story hotel for the site, prior to the COVID-19 pandemic. 1700 Pavilion is expected to cost $120 million, and is scheduled to open in October 2022. The building's major tenants include two law firms and Wynn Design & Development, a subsidiary of Wynn Resorts.

=== Residential ===
Downtown Summerlin's second phase, being planned as of 2014, would involve housing development on the land along the eastern side of the parcel. The second phase would have 4,000 housing units, including townhouses, apartments, and residential buildings up to 20 stories in height. Over the next decade, the housing development was expected to have capacity for up to 10,000 residents. There were no plans to include single-family homes.

In April 2014, the Howard Hughes Corporation announced plans for the first residential project in Downtown Summerlin: a three-story, 124-unit, gated apartment complex. It would be a joint venture of the Hughes Corporation and Calida Group, built on 4.5 acres, located northeast of the shopping center. Construction of the apartment complex, named Constellation, began in late 2014. The name is a reference to the Lockheed Constellation, which was financed by Howard Hughes during the 1940s and 1950s. Completion was originally scheduled for late 2015, but was delayed until the following year. Construction was scheduled to conclude in October 2016, although some residents began moving in two months prior.

In September 2017, Howard Hughes Corporation was planning a second Downtown Summerlin apartment complex, to be built on nine acres at the northeast corner of Sahara Avenue and Pavilion Center Drive. Construction of the new $59 million apartment complex was underway in February 2018, and the name was unveiled to be "Tanager" the following year. Like the Constellation, Tanager is also named after an airplane, the Curtiss Tanager. Future residential projects in Downtown Summerlin will continue the theme of aviation names to reflect Hughes' aviation career. The first residents began moving into Tanager in August 2019. The complex has 267 units. It is the first apartment complex in Summerlin to be designed entirely by Howard Hughes Corporation. The apartment complex's second phase, called Tanager Echo, began construction in 2021. It will include 295 units, in buildings ranging from five to six stories, and is scheduled to open in 2023.

=== Other development ===
The City National Arena opened at Downtown Summerlin in 2017, followed by the Las Vegas Ballpark in 2019; both are located on Downtown Summerlin's eastern 200-acre parcel, and are north of the Tanager apartment complex. As of 2019, there were 160 remaining acres awaiting development in Downtown Summerlin. Future development over the next 10 years would include more businesses and more than 4,000 residential units, to be built near the ballpark and City National Arena. In addition to more residential projects, other plans would include additional office and retail space.

An expansion began in 2023, on 7.4 acres at the southeast corner of Downtown Summerlin, near the apartment properties. The addition will include Whole Foods Market as an anchor tenant, moving from an earlier location after more than 20 years. Other tenants will include additional restaurants.

== Gallery ==
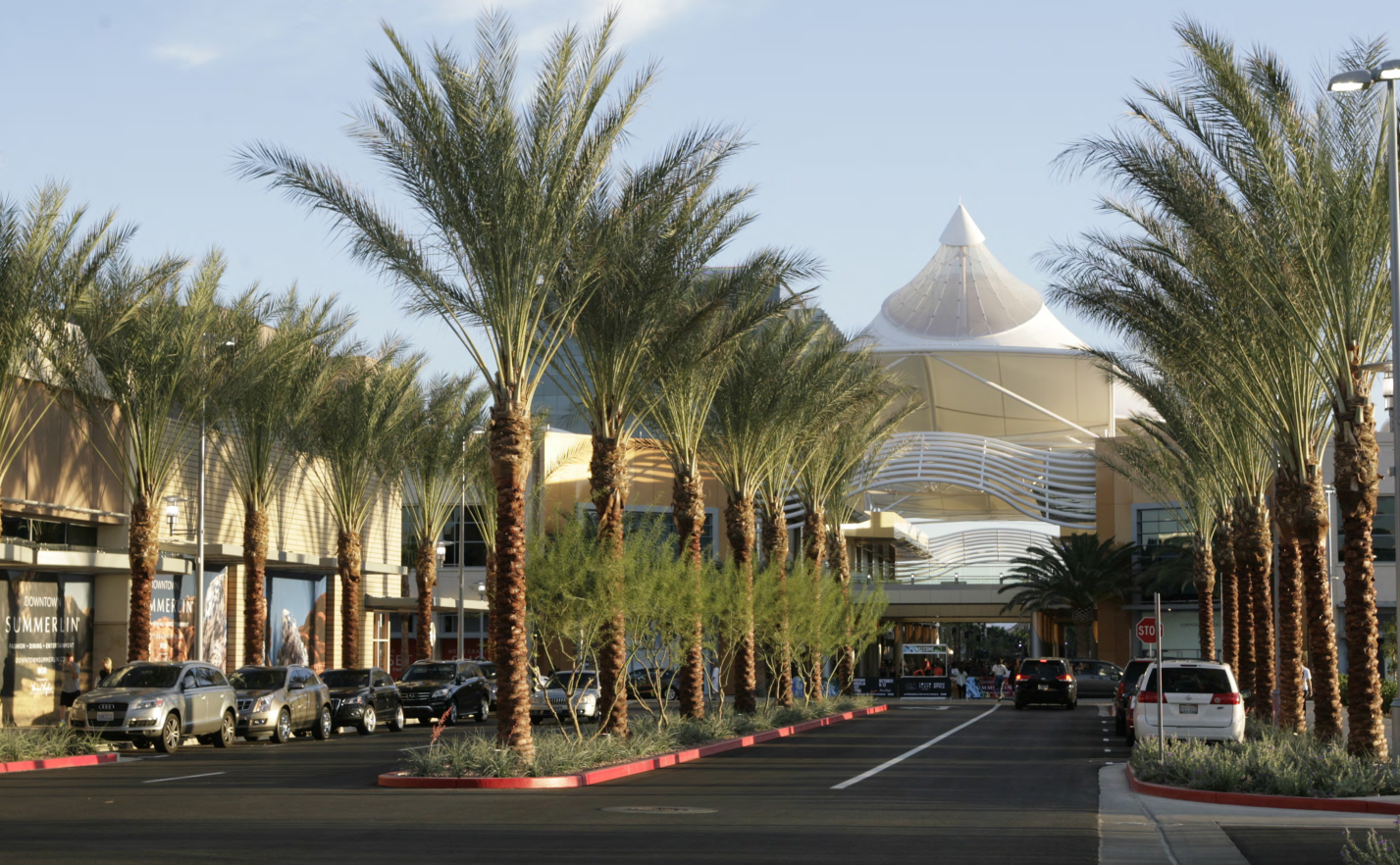
Tree-lined street in Downtown Summerlin.

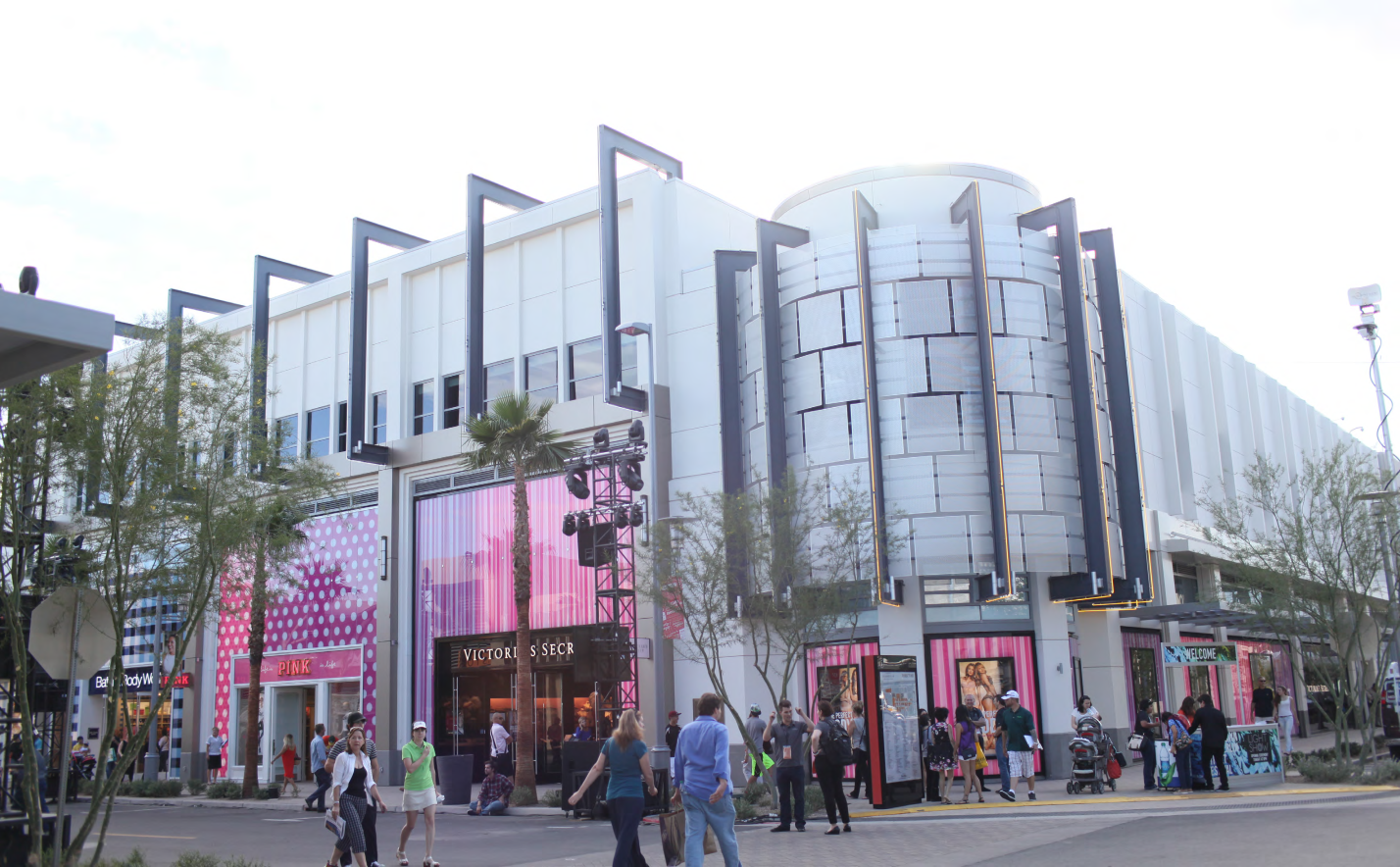
Downtown Summerlin shopping center.

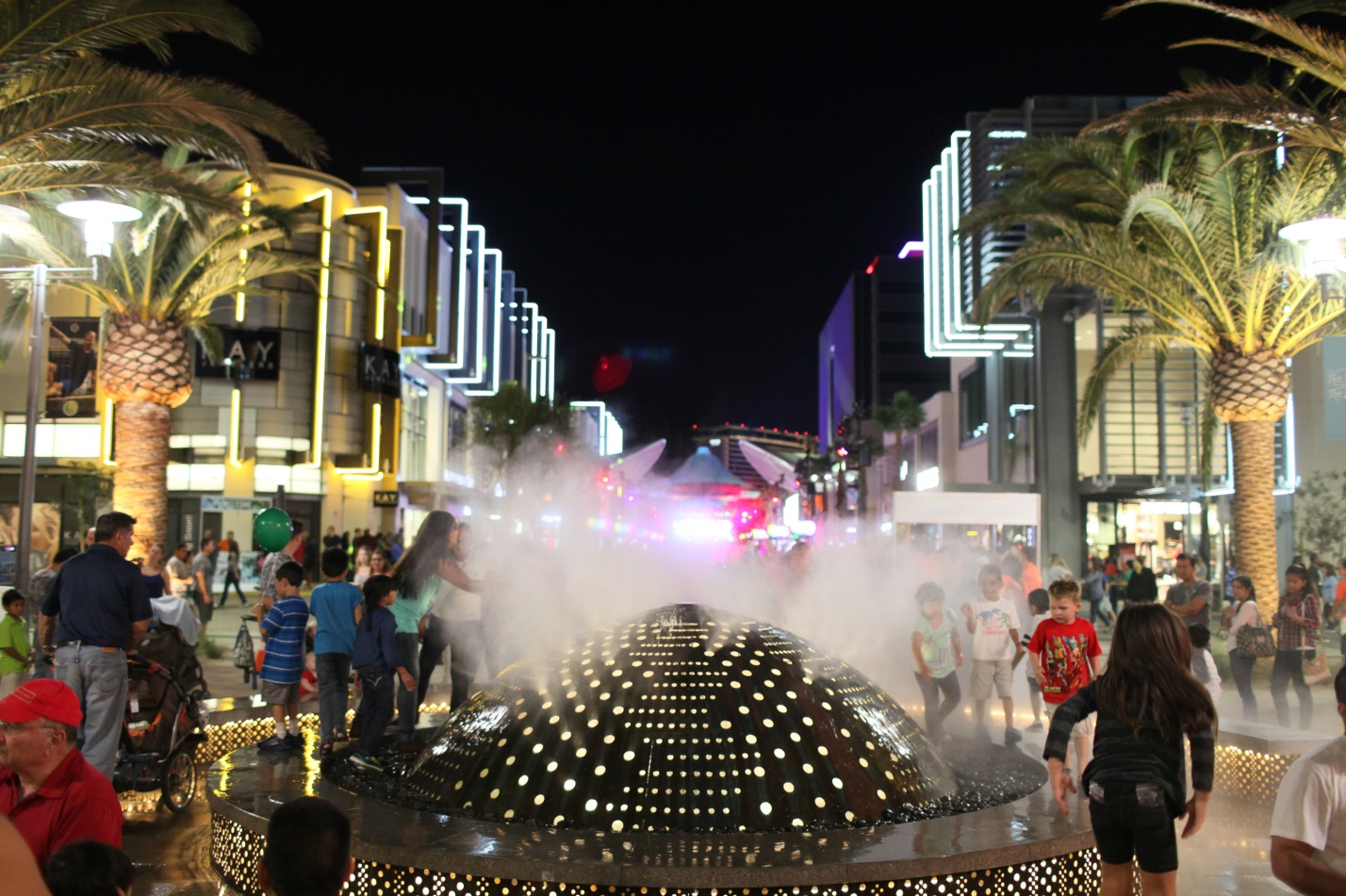
Shopping center at night.

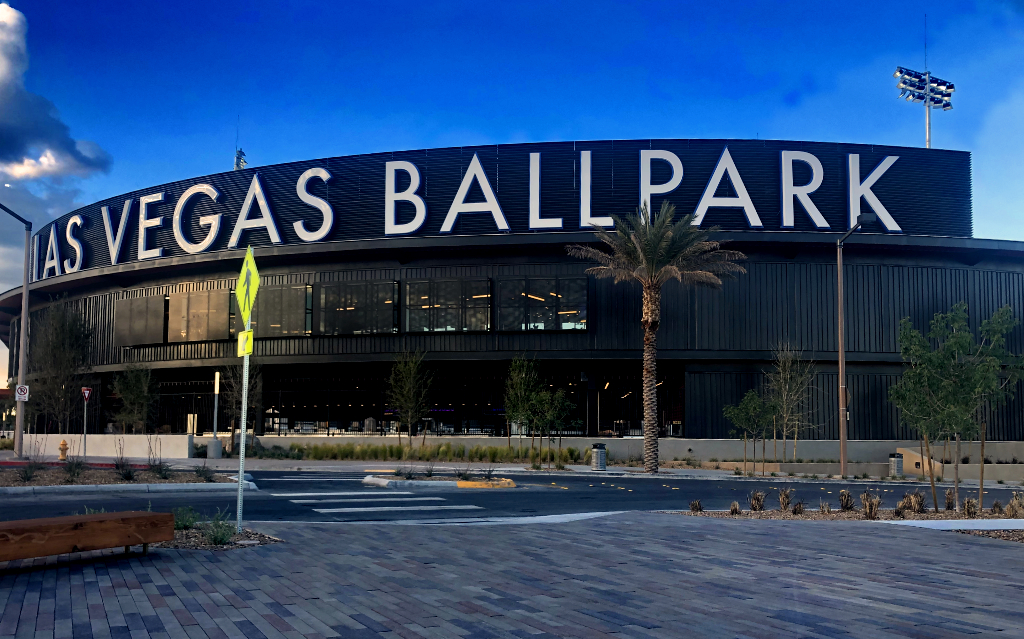
Las Vegas Ballpark

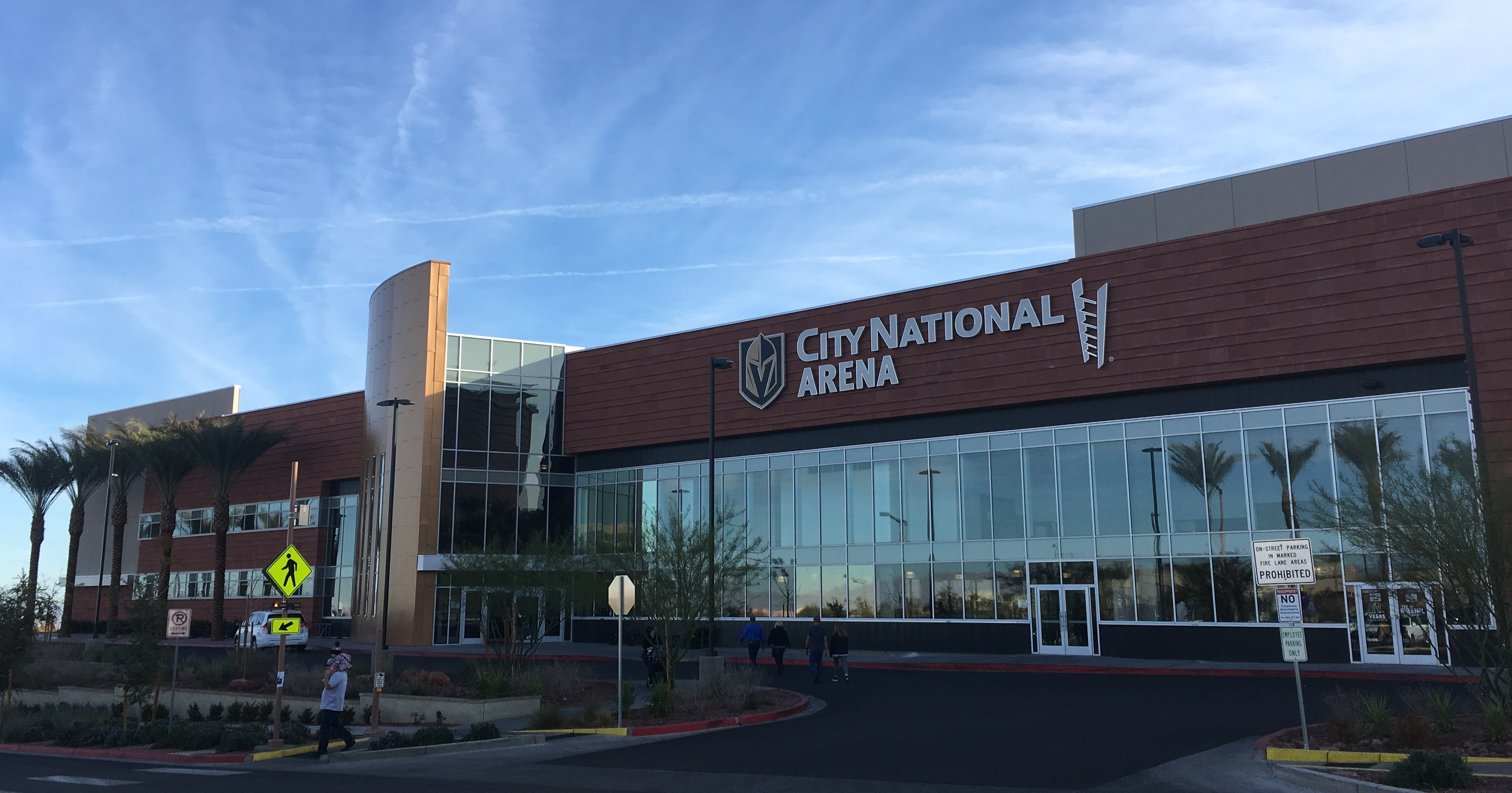
City National Arena
