= Lotus of Siam =

Thai restaurant in Las Vegas

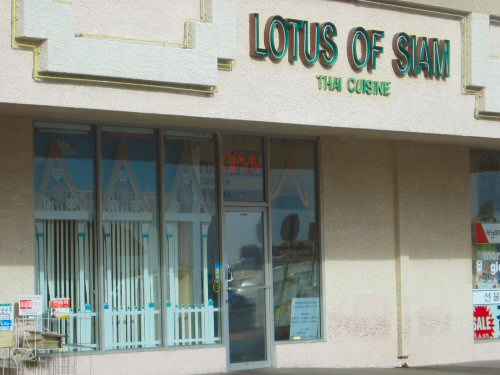
Lotus of Siam

Lotus of Siam is a Thai restaurant in Las Vegas, Nevada, in the U.S.

== History ==
The restaurant opened in 1999 on East Sahara Avenue. In 2010, the owner and chef Saipin Chutima opened a Lotus of Siam in New York with a partner, but the next year she left the partnership.

The Sahara Avenue location served as the only location while the Flamingo Road extension underwent renovations in 2022.

A related location opened at Red Rock Resort in 2022, operated by daughter Penny Chutima.

== Cuisine ==
The restaurant serves traditional northern Thai dishes.

== Reception ==
Jonathan Gold wrote in Saveur that it was "the best Thai restaurant in North America...[and] has become probably the most famous Thai restaurant in the United States". Adam Platt, writing in New York Magazine, called the restaurant "one of the premier Thai destinations in the West". Wine Spectator called its wine list one of the best in an Asian restaurant in the US.

Chutima, who runs it with her husband and daughters, was co-winner of the James Beard Award for Best Chef Southwest in 2011.
