= Downtown Summerlin (shopping center) =

Downtown Summerlin Mall
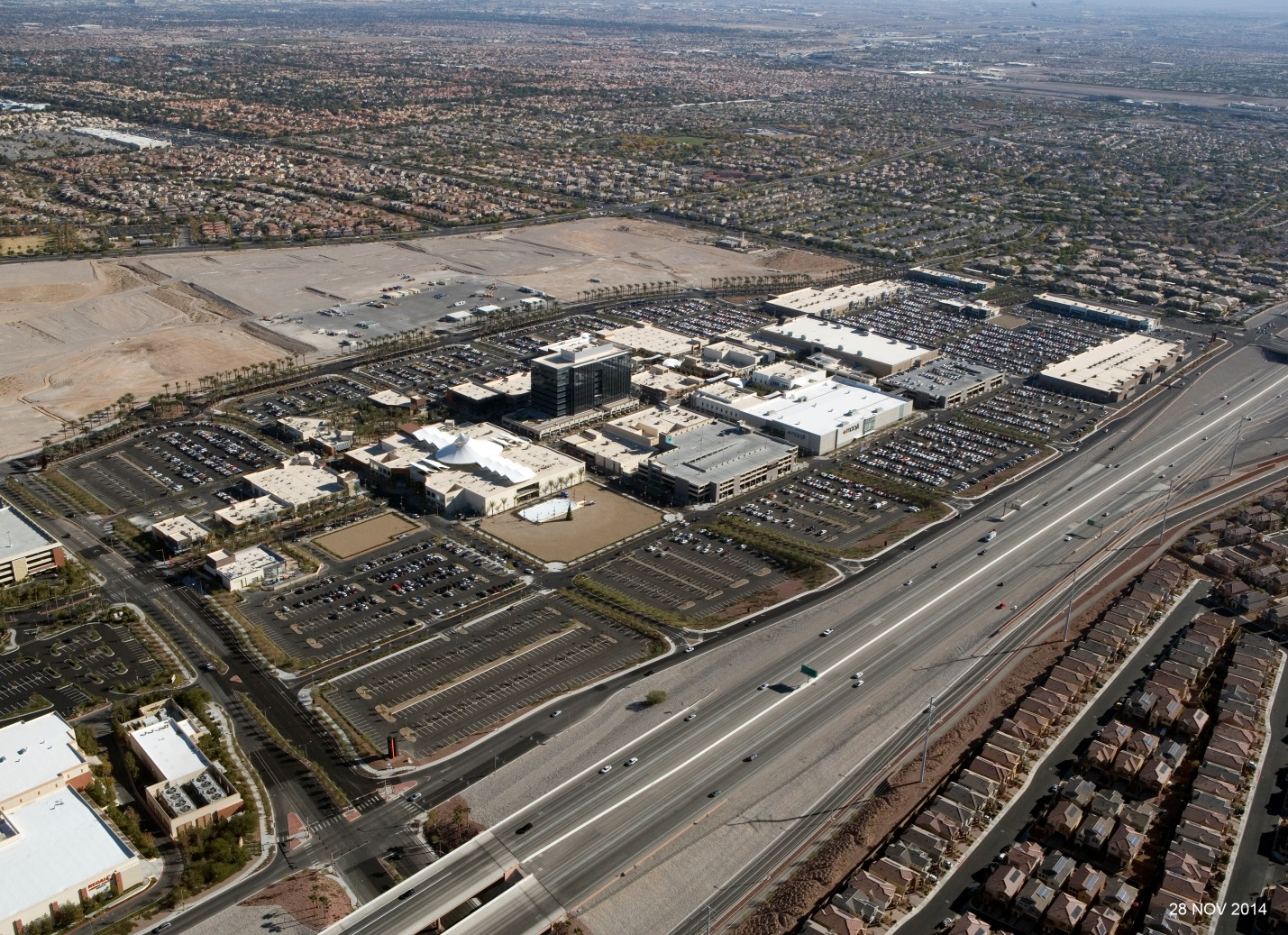
- Aerial view of Downtown Summerlin Mall
- Location: Summerlin South, Nevada, U.S.
- Coordinates: 36°08′58″N 115°20′0″W
- Address: 1980 Festival Plaza Dr, Las Vegas, NV 89135
- Opened: October 9, 2014; 12 years ago
- Previous names: Summerlin Centre (2004–2005); The Shops at Summerlin Centre (2005–2014)
- Developer: Summa Corporation (1988–1996); The Rouse Company (1996–2004); General Growth Properties (2004–2010); The Howard Hughes Corporation (2010–2014)
- Manager: Howard Hughes Holdings, Inc.
- Owner: Howard Hughes Holdings, Inc.
- Architect: ELS Architecture and Urban Design
- Num. of stores: 125
- Num. of anchor tenants: 2
- Parking: 6,400
- Public transit: RTC Transit Downtown Summerlin Transit Facility
- Website: downtownsummerlin.com

The Downtown Summerlin shopping center or DTS is an outdoor shopping, dining, and entertainment center. It is a part of the greater Downtown Summerlin area, a 400-acre (160 ha) development which lies within the community of Summerlin South on the western outskirts of Las Vegas, Nevada. The shopping center contains 1,600,000 square feet (150,000 m^{2}) and is located on 106 acres (43 ha).

The two major anchor stores are Dillard's and Macy's. In total, Downtown Summerlin is home to over 125 shops, bars, and restaurants, as well as a Regal Cinemas movie theater.

A mall for the Summerlin community had been planned by Summa Corporation (renamed Howard Hughes Corporation in 1994; not to be confused with the current Howard Hughes Corporation) since 1988, but was delayed several times, and development had changed hands several times as well following acquisitions. The Rouse Company acquired Howard Hughes Corporation in 1996. General Growth Properties then acquired The Rouse Company in 2004, and began work on the site in 2007, to build what was then known as The Shops at Summerlin Centre. Construction was cancelled in 2008, due to financial problems. GGP spun off development to the Howard Hughes Corporation, which therefore took over the project in 2010, and resumed construction in 2013. Downtown Summerlin's grand opening was held on October 9, 2014.

== History ==
A shopping mall had been a part of Summa Corporation's master plan for Summerlin, Nevada, since announcing the community in 1988. The project was once planned as an indoor mall with several department stores. Summa Corporation was rebranded to The Howard Hughes Corporation in 1994. By February 1996, the Howard Hughes Corporation had plans for a 100-acre shopping mall, to be built near Charleston Boulevard and Town Center Drive. The mall was expected to be opened by the end of the 1990s. Later in 1996, the Howard Hughes Corporation became a subsidiary of The Rouse Company. In March 1997, the Howard Hughes Corporation announced that the mall would contain 1,000,000 sq ft (93,000 m^{2}) and would be opened by 2000. It would include five department stores as anchor tenants. The mall would be developed by The Rouse Company through the Howard Hughes Corporation subsidiary.

As of May 1998, the mall was expected to open in spring 2001. The planned Summerlin Town Center project would include the proposed mall as well as office space. Anchor tenants would include Robinsons-May, Lord & Taylor, and Dillard's, while Nordstrom would be a potential anchor tenant. In May 1999, Rouse announced Sears as an additional anchor tenant. The mall, known then as Summerlin Center, was scheduled to open in 2004. As of 2001, the Summerlin Town Center Mall was scheduled for completion in spring 2005.

As of 2003, the mall was being planned as part of the proposed Summerlin Town Centre. Rouse intended to begin developing the project in 2004, following the completion of an expansion at the Fashion Show Mall. Construction was not scheduled to begin until at least early 2005, with a first phase expected to open in 2006. By 2004, the mall was scheduled to open in 2006 or 2007. Later in 2004, General Growth Properties (GGP) purchased The Rouse Company and its Howard Hughes subsidiary. The acquisition was a primary reason that the mall's opening was delayed to 2008.

In May 2005, GGP announced that the mall would be named Summerlin Centre. It would be an outdoor mall with up to six anchor tenants. As of October 2005, the mall project was known as The Shops at Summerlin Centre. In May 2006, GGP announced that the mall would feature 1,200,000 sq ft (110,000 m^{2}), including four anchor stores. It would be part of the Summerlin Centre project, which GGP planned to begin constructing in spring 2007, for a scheduled grand opening in fall 2008. Nordstrom was announced as an anchor tenant in March 2007. At the time, GGP was in the early stages of planning the mall. The first phase of The Shops at Summerlin Centre was planned to open in 2009. GGP intended for the project to serve as the heart of Summerlin.

=== Construction ===
Work began on the site in April 2007. By February 2008, construction was ongoing for the mall's underground parking. A construction permit for the mall was issued in April 2008. The following month, Macy's and Dillard's were announced as additional anchor tenants in the mall. Upon its planned opening in October 2009, the mall was expected to feature 100 stores and 10 restaurants.

In August 2008, GGP announced that it would suspend construction of The Shops at Summerlin Centre due to financial problems. The company intended to delay the project by at least 12 months. If GGP had proceeded with the 2009 opening, the mall would be about 70 percent occupied, approximately 23 percent lower than the company's usual mall occupancy rates. Construction was suspended on October 31, 2008. The project was 40 percent completed, and consisted of an unfinished steel superstructure. Prior to the 2008 financial crisis, the project had been valued at $220 million. GGP filed for bankruptcy in 2009.

In December 2009, three construction companies involved in the mall project took legal action against GGP to receive compensation for the work that was done on the unfinished project, which was no longer under construction. One construction company also stated that the steel superstructure was deteriorating in value because of its exposure to environmental elements, raising the possibility that it may need to be demolished and rebuilt if the project should resume. GGP consulted with engineers to preserve the project's structural integrity. In February 2010, GGP settled with the construction companies.

GGP spun off the mall to a new company (but is not to be confused with the company of the same name since 1994 that was formerly Summa Corporation) The Howard Hughes Corporation, and it took over the project in 2010. In September 2012, The Howard Hughes Corporation announced that construction would resume on The Shops at Summerlin, with Macy's still intended as an anchor tenant and an opening scheduled for fall 2014. Howard Hughes CEO David Weinreb criticized GGP for not finishing the project as originally scheduled. Tom Warden, senior vice president for Howard Hughes Corporation, later said that the project's delay turned out to be for the better "in the sense that the design now is more evolved." Initially, the project was designed with a single linear street design, before being changed to two streets. Other changes included a marketplace added at the southern end, and freestanding restaurants that surround a courtyard.

Construction resumed in July 2013. Nordstrom Rack was announced as a tenant in September 2013. Bath & Body Works, Michael Kors, Old Navy, Sephora, True Religion, Ulta Beauty, and Victoria's Secret were announced as tenants in January 2014. The Shops at Summerlin project was expected to cost $391 million. As of March 2014, Howard Hughes Corporation had spent $181 million on developing the project. In May 2014, the company announced that the mall would open on October 9, 2014, as Downtown Summerlin rather than The Shops at Summerlin. The mall occupies 106 acres (43 ha), part of the greater Downtown Summerlin area, which has a total of 400 acres (160 ha). In July 2014, Howard Hughes Corporation secured a $312 million loan to finance the mall project, which had more than 2,000 construction workers. The Downtown Summerlin mall was one of the biggest retail projects under construction in the United States, only ranking behind the American Dream Meadowlands mall in New Jersey.

=== Operation ===
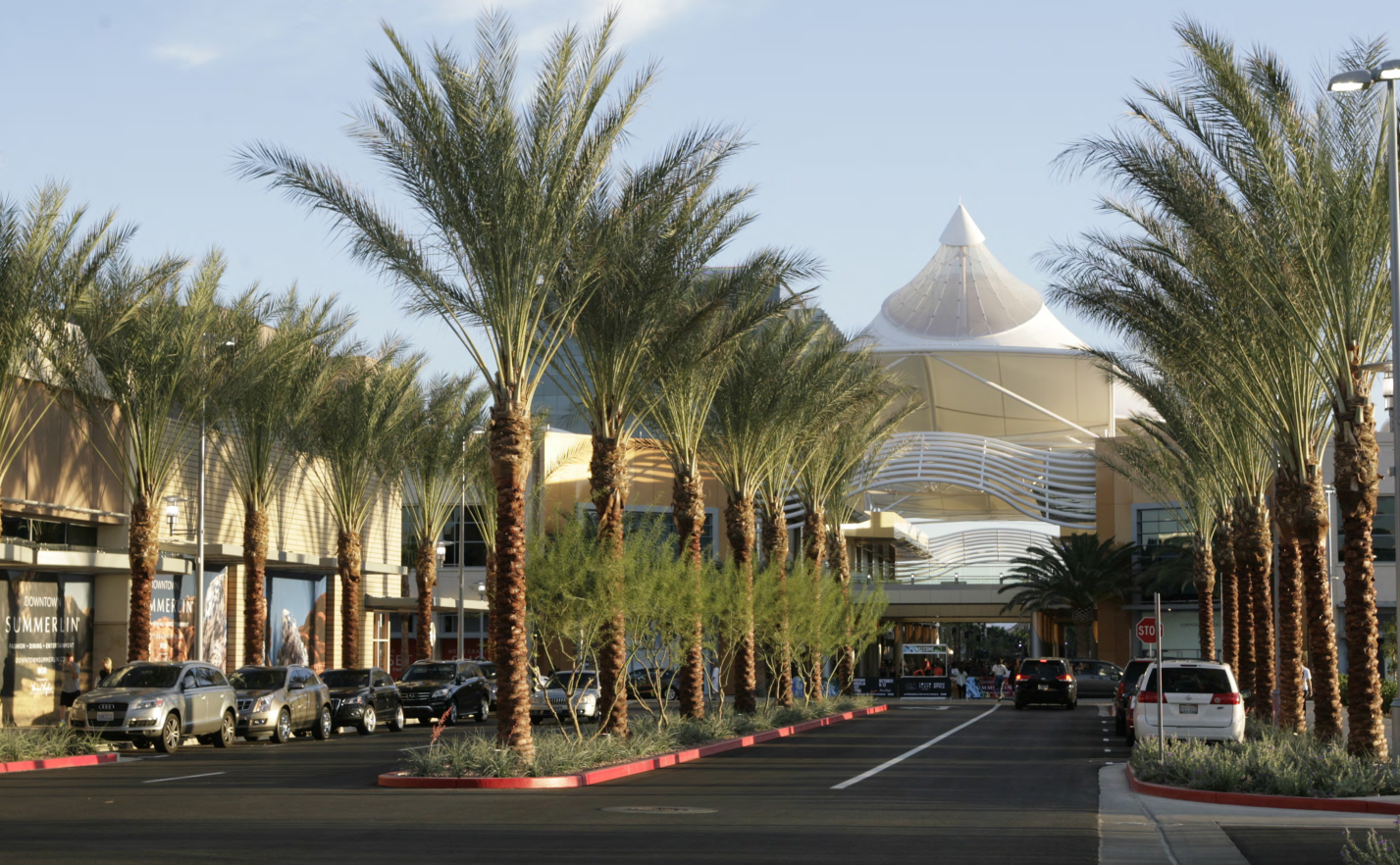
Tree-lined street at Downtown Summerlin

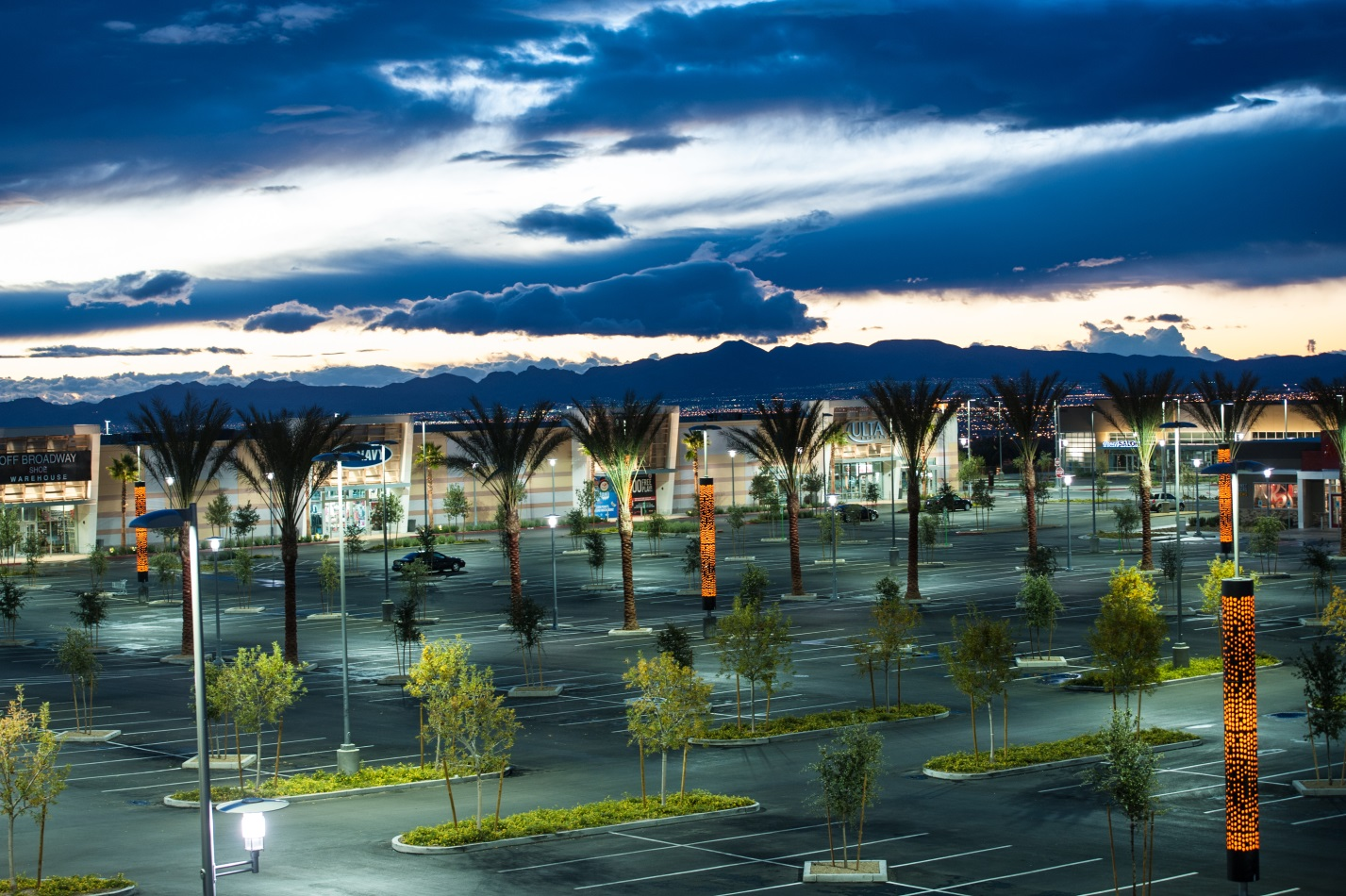
Downtown Summerlin in 2015

Downtown Summerlin includes a five-screen Regal Cinemas movie theater, which opened on October 5, 2014, and hosted discounted screenings for the next several days to benefit charity ahead of the official grand opening four days later. The mall portion opened as scheduled on October 9, 2014, with 85 of its 125 stores ready for business. Additional stores were scheduled to open in the coming months. The shopping, dining, and entertainment center contains a total of 1,600,000 square feet (150,000 m^{2}). The opening night included a fireworks and light show, and a four-day street festival was held to celebrate the opening. Nevada governor Brian Sandoval kicked off the street party.

Thousands of people visited Downtown Summerlin on its opening day, causing issues with traffic and parking. More than 250,000 people visited Downtown Summerlin during its grand opening weekend. The center has 6,400 parking spaces, as well as tree-lined streets and walkways. The area includes approximately 400 palm trees. Downtown Summerlin had 111 announced tenants at the time of its opening, employing a total of 2,000 people. Dillard's opening was celebrated with six fashion shows. The mall included 32 planned restaurants at the time of its opening, although many of them were not ready for the opening day. Instead, food trucks provided services. Nordstrom Rack held its grand opening on October 24, 2014.

More than one million customers had visited Downtown Summerlin as of November 2014, and many retailers were surpassing expectations. Executives in the local commercial real estate market believed that Downtown Summerlin would help the local economy grow. In November 2014, Howard Hughes Corporation opened an ice rink on vacant land near the mall's north parking garage. The site was originally intended for future development as a third department store. The land was subsequently made into a park, although the ice rink continues to return each year around Christmas time. The Summerlin Festival of Arts began holding its art festival event at Downtown Summerlin in 2015, and has continued to do so each year.

== Major tenants ==
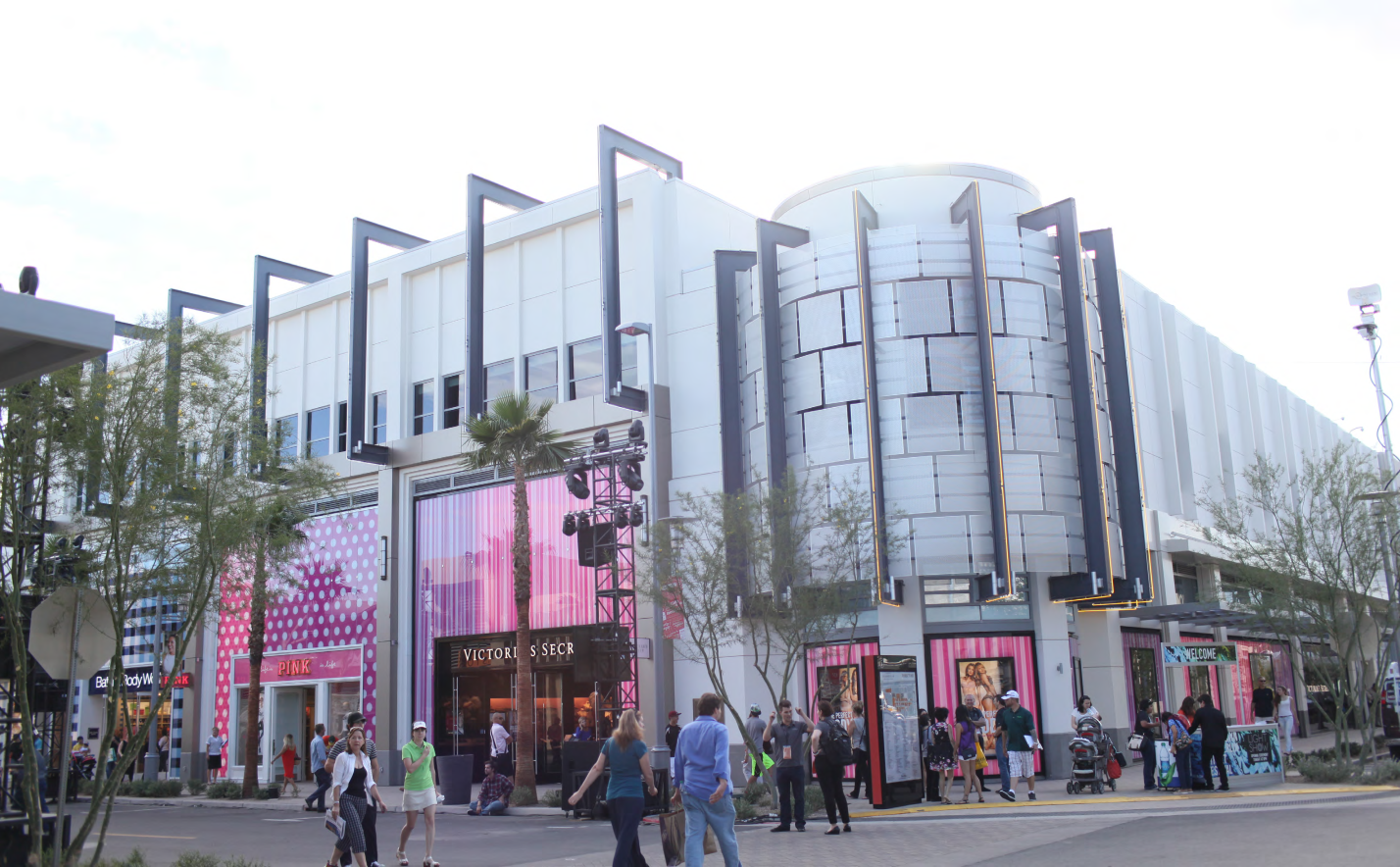
Shopping at Downtown Summerlin.

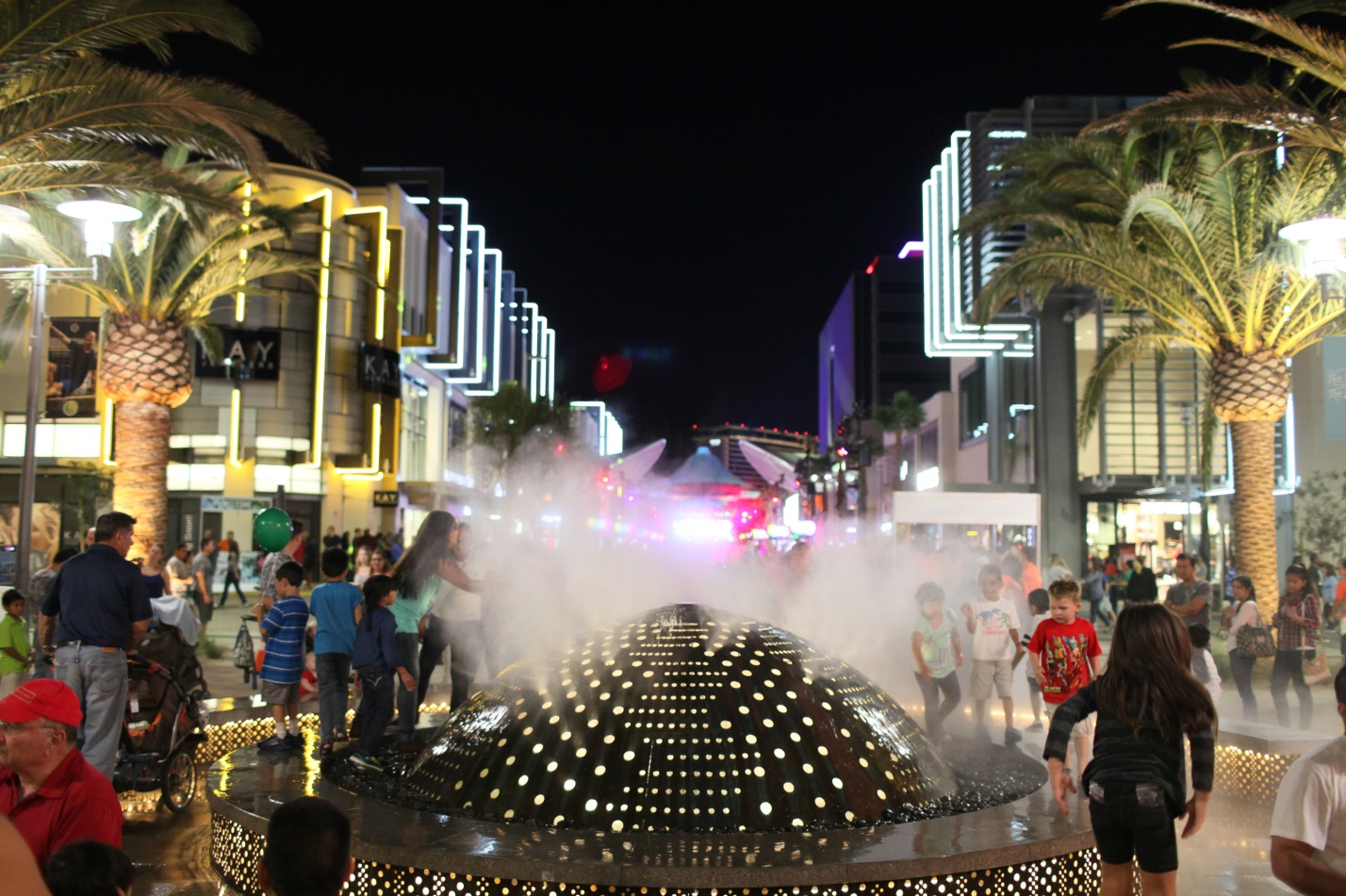
Downtown Summerlin at night.

Fashion retailers and new dining options were a primary focus for the mall upon its opening.

Trader Joe's was the most frequently requested tenant from people in the years leading up to the mall's opening. Other tenants include various restaurants, such as Lazy Dog Restaurant & Bar, the Wolfgang Puck Bar & Grill, and the school-themed Public School 702 restaurant. Relentless Church held religious services inside the Regal Cinemas movie theater in December 2014. The One Summerlin office tower is located within the shopping center, and has retailers on its ground floor.

== See also ==
- City National Arena
- Las Vegas Ballpark
- Red Rock Casino, Resort & Spa
