= Red Rock Casino, Resort & Spa =

Casino resort in Las Vegas, Nevada

Red Rock Resort

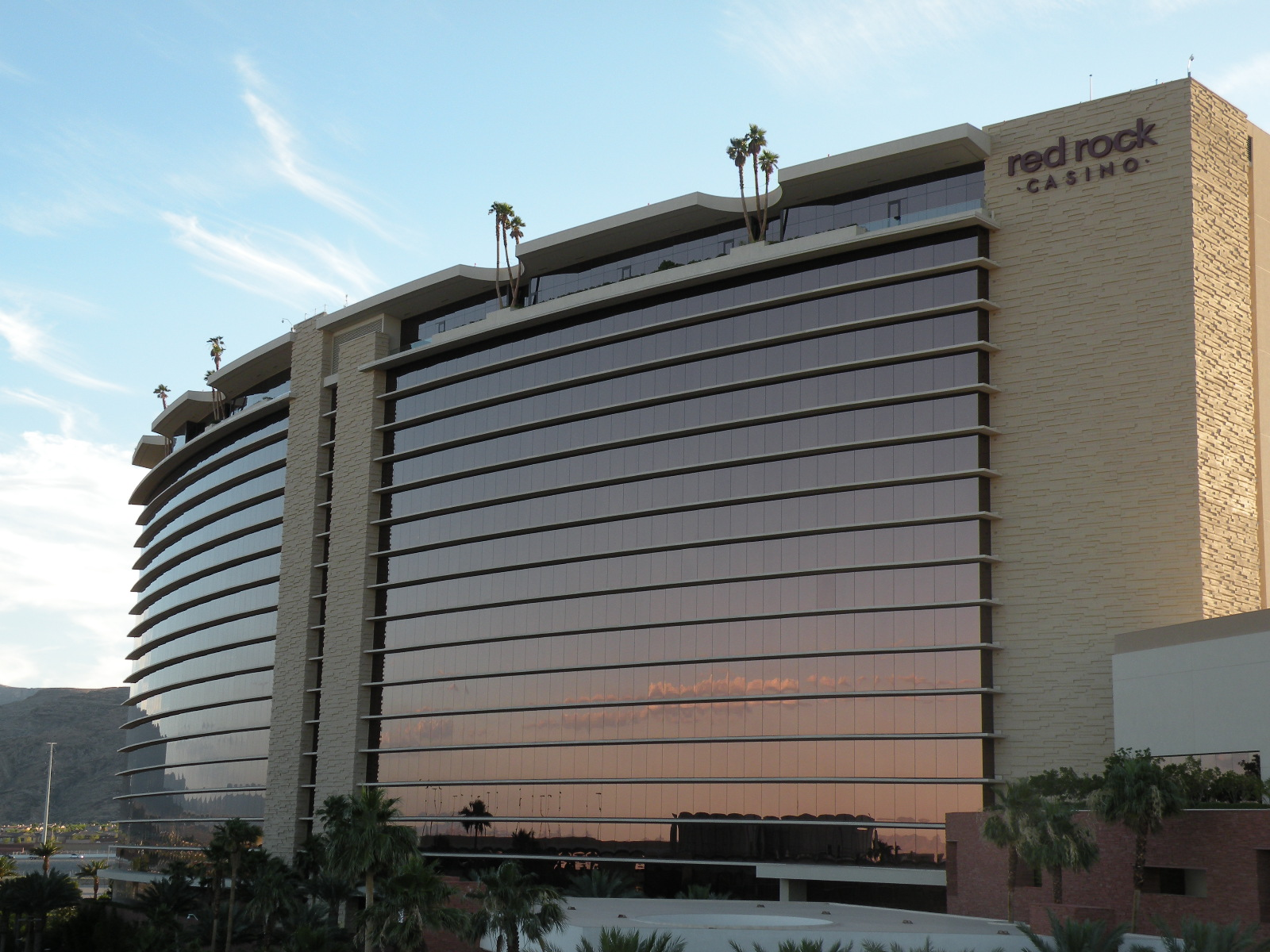
- Exterior view (July 2010)
- Interactive map of Red Rock Resort
- Location: Summerlin South, Nevada, U.S.; 11011 West Charleston Boulevard; 36°9′16″N 115°19′49″W
- Opened: April 18, 2006; 20 years ago
- Theme: Modern/desert
- No. of rooms: 796
- Gaming space: 118,309 sq ft (10,991.3 m^{2})
- Signature attractions: Red Rock Lanes; Regal Cinemas
- Notable restaurants: Feast Buffet (2006–2020); T-Bones Chophouse; Yard House; Lucille's Smokehouse
- Casino type: Land-based
- Owner: Station Casinos
- Renovated in: 2006–2007, 2014, 2019–2020
- Website: redrockresort.com

Red Rock Resort is a casino hotel in Summerlin South, Nevada, located in the Las Vegas Valley. It is owned and operated by Station Casinos on 59.43 acres (24.05 ha) located in the Downtown Summerlin neighborhood. It is Station Casinos' flagship property, and the company's corporate headquarters is located on the property.

The project was announced in July 2002 and is named after the nearby Red Rock Canyon National Conservation Area. The project initially was to include a 23-story, 300-foot hotel tower with 1,000 rooms, as well as timeshare buildings that would be added in a future phase. In October 2003, the project received opposition from people who believed that it would harm the quality of life for Summerlin residents and that it would destroy the views of Red Rock Canyon. A compromise was ultimately reached in January 2004, reducing the hotel tower to 198 feet while removing the timeshare aspect entirely.

Groundbreaking began in April 2004, and the resort was topped off in March 2005, before opening on April 18, 2006, as the second casino in Summerlin. Red Rock Resort was Station Casinos' most expensive property, built at a cost of $925 million, including a hotel expansion that opened in 2007. A separate $65 million expansion also occurred during 2006, and included a $31 million bowling alley, the most expensive in the world. A six-month, $35 million expansion was announced in 2014, and included the addition of several new restaurants. The resort includes a 118,309 sq ft (10,991.3 m^{2}) casino, a 796-room hotel, a 3-acre (1.2 ha) pool area, a spa, 94,000 sq ft (8,700 m^{2}) of meeting space, and a 16-screen movie theater. The hotel tower is the second tallest building in Summerlin after One Queensridge Place.

== History ==
In July 2002, Station Casinos and Howard Hughes Corporation made a deal that gave Station Casinos the option to purchase a 73-acre (30 ha) (later 67.6 acres) site in Summerlin, Nevada, at the southeast corner of the Las Vegas Beltway and west Charleston Boulevard. That month, Station Casinos announced plans to build a then-unnamed hotel-casino on the property. The company had until October 2002 to purchase the property for a total of $65 million.

Station Casinos expected to complete its purchase of the land by June 2003, with construction scheduled to begin late that year or in early 2004. Construction was expected to take approximately 15 months, with a cost of more than $300 million. It would be Station Casinos' largest and most expensive resort, and would compete against the nearby Suncoast and Rampart casinos. The site was chosen over other locations that Station Casinos owned – also along the beltway in the west Las Vegas Valley – because of its location within the planned village of Summerlin Centre. Station Casinos tentatively referred to the project as Charleston Station. By April 2003, the project had been named "Red Rock Station", after the Red Rock Canyon National Conservation Area, located approximately three miles away. Like its recent Green Valley Ranch resort, Station Casinos planned for the Red Rock Station to target upscale tourists and local residents as its primary clientele.

=== Opposition ===
The project initially was to include a 23-story, 300-foot (91 m) hotel tower with 1,000 rooms in its first phase, while future phases would add two 23-story, 200-foot (61 m) timeshare condominium towers with 250 rooms each, for an ultimate total of 1,500 rooms. The project would require an exemption from county officials, as the land was only zoned for towers up to 100 feet (30 m). In October 2003, the project received opposition from people who believed that it would harm the quality of life for Summerlin residents and that it would destroy the views of Red Rock Canyon. Opponents also believed that the 1,500-room count was too much for the nearby residential area. Because of the opposition, Station Casinos delayed its request for approval from the Clark County Planning Commission, giving the company time to pitch the project to opponents. Station Casinos, which had been surprised by the opposition, noted that the property had been zoned for gaming for more than a decade prior. Nearby homeowners had also been informed upon purchasing their houses that the land was zoned for a potential casino project.

The Culinary Workers Union, along with environmental organizations Sierra Club and The Conservation Fund, joined opponents of the project, stating that the tower would ruin the nearby views. At a cost of approximately $4,000, Culinary and the Sierra Club mailed fliers to more than 10,000 residents, urging them to tell the Clark County Commission to reject the 300-foot tower. It was the first time that the union had teamed up with an environmental group to become involved in an environmental issue. At the time, Culinary had been involved in an ongoing effort to unionize Station Casinos' 11,000 employees. Station Casinos stated that Culinary only opposed the Red Rock Station because of the company's non-union status, a claim that was denied by the union. In late October 2003, Station Casinos held an event to educate residents about the project and to answer questions. Nearly 250 people attended the event, which received a mixed reaction of opposition and support. Several days later, the Clark County Planning Commission approved the 300-foot tower.

Residents continued to oppose the tower, and opponents worked to gather support in an effort to derail the project. Opposition groups sent recorded phone messages to more than 200,000 southern Nevada residents urging against the project, and rallies supporting and opposing the project were held in November 2003. By December 2003, a county voice mailbox had received 591 recorded messages since September, with 494 of the messages from opponents of the project or its tower; 97 of the messages were from supporters. The county had also received over 3,200 emails and letters, with approximately 100 of them in support of the project. That month, the Clark County Commission delayed a vote on the project until January 2004, while telling opponents and supporters to work on a compromise ahead of the vote.

Station Casinos stated that a 300-foot tower was necessary to ensure that guests would have unobstructed views of the Las Vegas Strip in the event that previously approved office towers would be built nearby the project. In subsequent negotiations, Station Casinos was willing to decrease the 300-foot tower to 268 feet (82 m), while opponents would support nothing above 130 feet (40 m). Station Casinos agreed to reduce its timeshare towers to 100 feet, removing 250 rooms from the project. After weeks of negotiations, Station Casinos and Summerlin residents compromised on a 198-foot (60 m) hotel tower and the complete removal of the timeshare buildings. The redesigned project was unanimously approved by the Clark County Commission in January 2004, with approval to build up to 1,000 rooms. Station Casinos stated that the redesign would increase the project's $400 million cost, with a price between $450 million and $475 million.

=== Construction ===
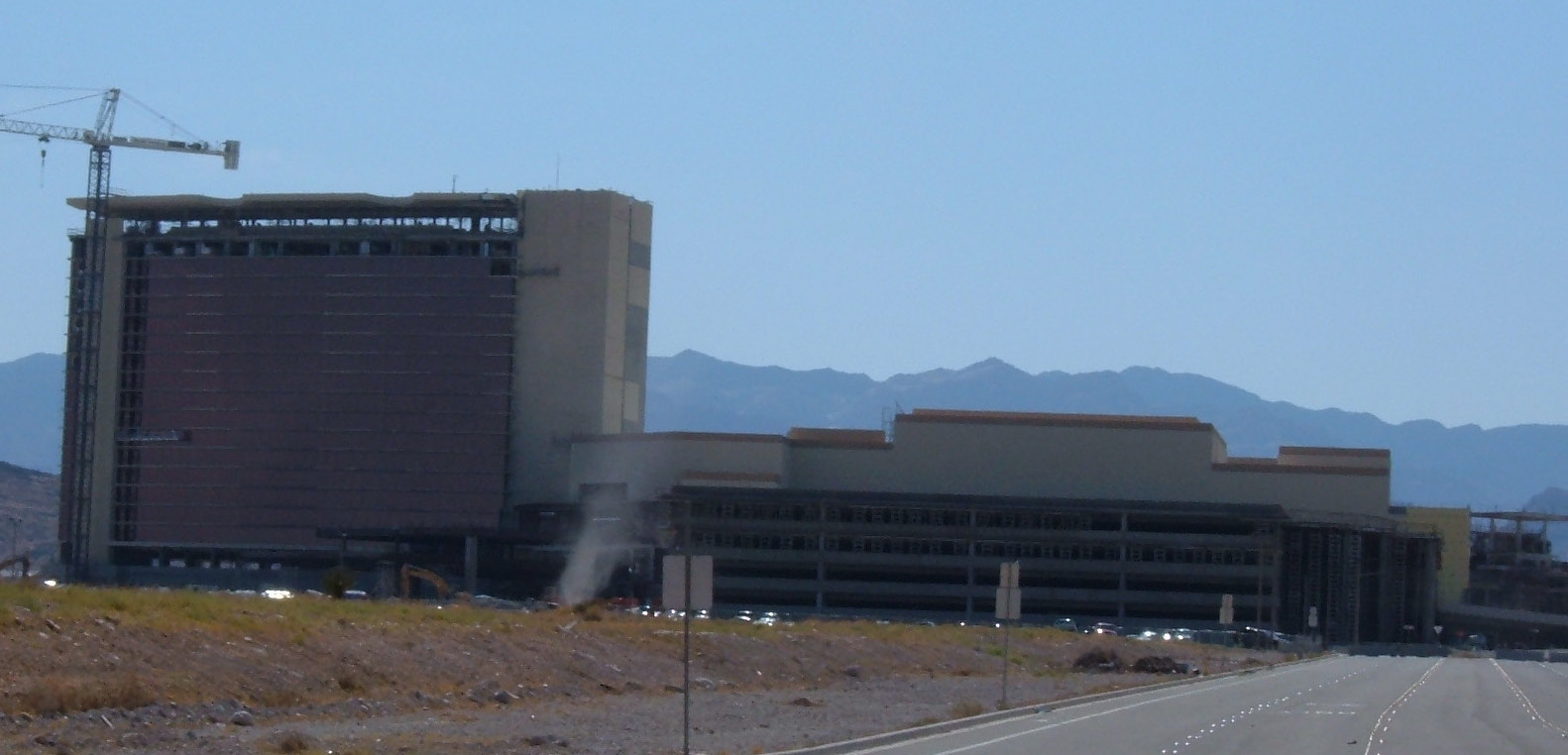
East side of the resort during construction, July 2005

The Red Rock resort was built in what would eventually become Downtown Summerlin. A groundbreaking ceremony was held for the resort on April 15, 2004, with an opening scheduled for early 2006. Perini Building Company was the general contractor for the project, which was designed by Portland-based Architropolis, Las Vegas-based The Friedmutter Group, and SADI. In May 2004, the Red Rock Station passed the Clark County Commission's design review without opposition.

In December 2004, despite residential opposition, the Clark County Commission approved two signs for the future resort: an 80-foot high sign with a video screen, to be built on the east side of the Las Vegas Beltway; and a 50-foot high sign, also with a video screen, to be built on West Charleston Boulevard. As of January 2005, the resort was expected to cost $475 million.

On March 15, 2005, Station Casinos announced plans to begin expanding the Red Rock Station before its opening, including an increase in hotel rooms from 400 to 850. The expansion was scheduled to begin in late 2005, with completion expected by late 2006. The expansion and rising construction costs increased the project's estimated cost to $800 million, which would make it the most expensive locals casino ever built in Las Vegas. The project was topped off on March 24, 2005, at which point it was known as Red Rock Resort Spa Casino. "Resort" was added to the name instead of the usual "Station" name used with the company's other properties, in order to denote the Red Rock property's luxury image.

By July 2005, the project's cost had increased to $925 million as a result of increased construction costs and design changes. An opening date of March 2006 was expected. For customer convenience, the resort was built with six entrances, two parking garages, two parking lots, and two valets. Station Casinos planned to hire 2,600 people for the Red Rock Resort, with approximately half of them expected to be transferred employees from the company's other local properties. More than 100,000 people applied for jobs at the resort during 2005.

A survey prior to the opening showed only minimal neighborhood opposition to the resort. Selected audiences were allowed to tour the resort in March and April 2006, prior to its opening. Employees underwent six weeks of pre-opening training to ensure preparedness for the public opening. Restaurants were operated and each hotel room was occupied three different times during the six-week period. A total of 4,000 people spent time at the resort during the final week before the public opening, and a total of 100,000 meals had been served during the six-week pre-opening period.

=== Opening and operation ===
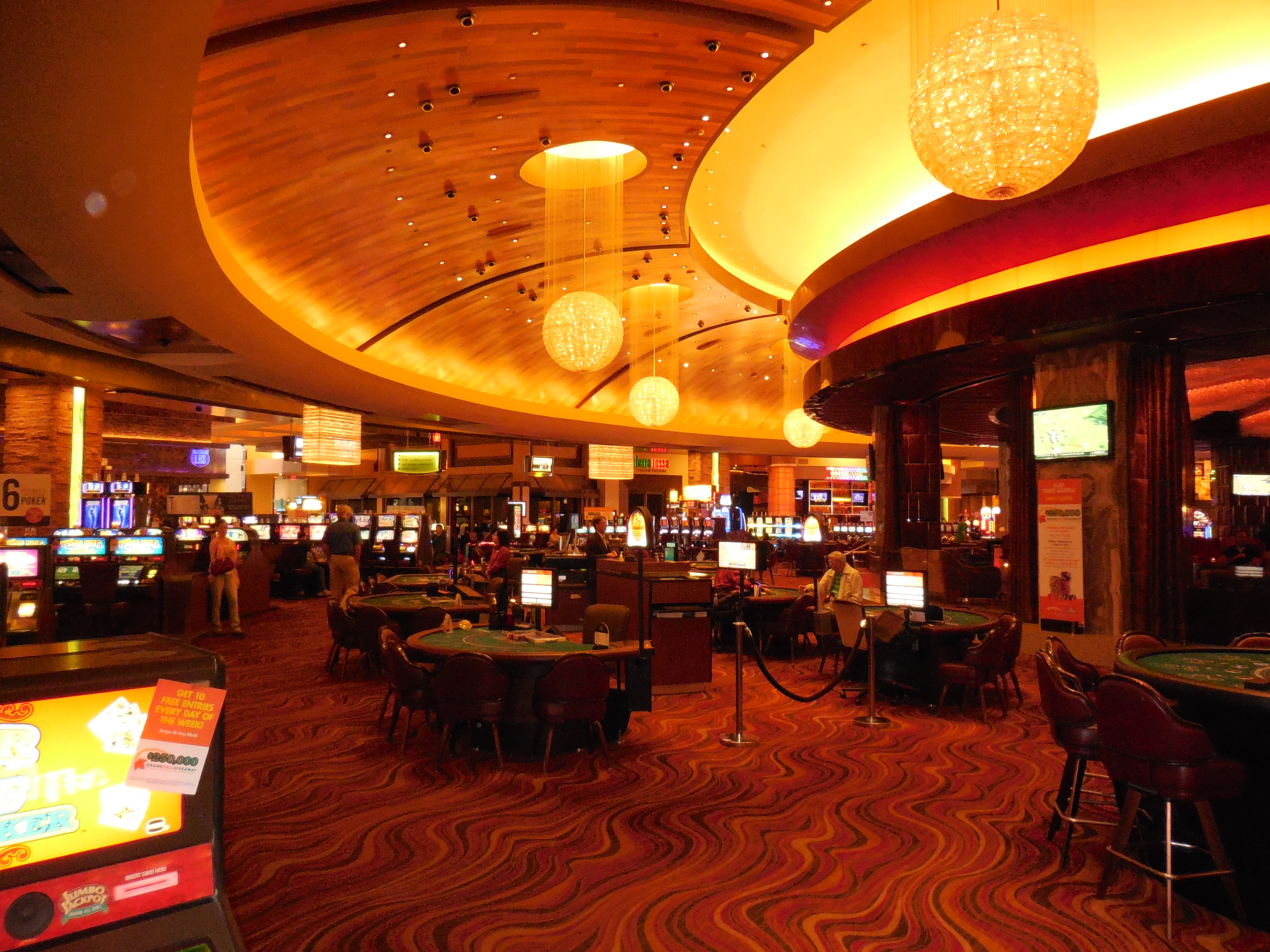
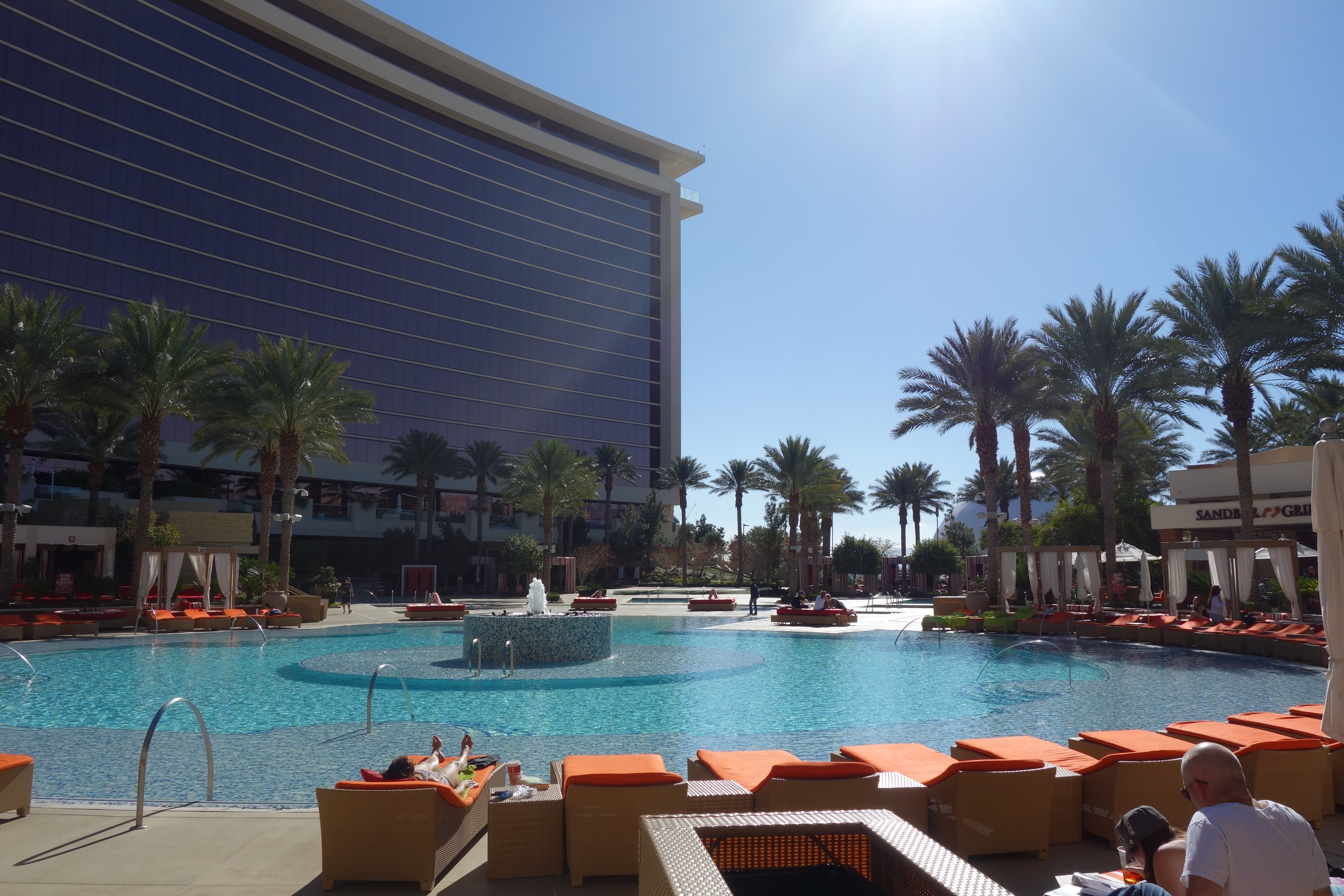
Casino floor and pool area in 2013

Station Casinos hosted 3,800 special guests at the resort on the night of April 18, 2006, prior to the public unveiling at midnight. Former Nevada governor and U.S. senator Richard Bryan attended the opening, as did Andre Agassi and officials from rival casino companies. Singer Sting held a one-hour concert at the resort's pool area as part of the grand opening celebration, which also included a six-minute fireworks show. Built at a cost of $925 million, the Red Rock Resort was Station Casinos' most expensive property. Approximately 80 percent of revenue was expected to come from local residents. Within six months of its opening, the Red Rock Resort had made $44 million in profit.

The resort opened with 415 hotel rooms, approximately half of its final room count. The remaining rooms, part of an expansion to the hotel tower, were expected to be open by December 2006. The Red Rock Resort was only the second casino to open in Summerlin, after the Rampart. The 87,000 sq ft (8,100 m^{2}) casino featured 62 gaming tables, including a 20-table poker room. The casino included nearly 3,200 slot machines, with slightly more than half of them being video poker. The casino also included a bingo room, while its sportsbook contained 213 seats and five VIP booths, with its signature attraction being three jumbo screens, measuring 18 feet by 32 feet. The sportsbook included bar service, as well as food service from the adjacent Turf Grill. The resort also featured 94,000 sq ft (8,700 m^{2}) of meeting space, and a luxury spa. The 3-acre (1.2 ha) pool area was located in the center of the resort property, surrounded by several restaurants, clubs, and the spa. A 16-screen movie theater, operated by Regal Cinemas, opened on April 21, 2006.

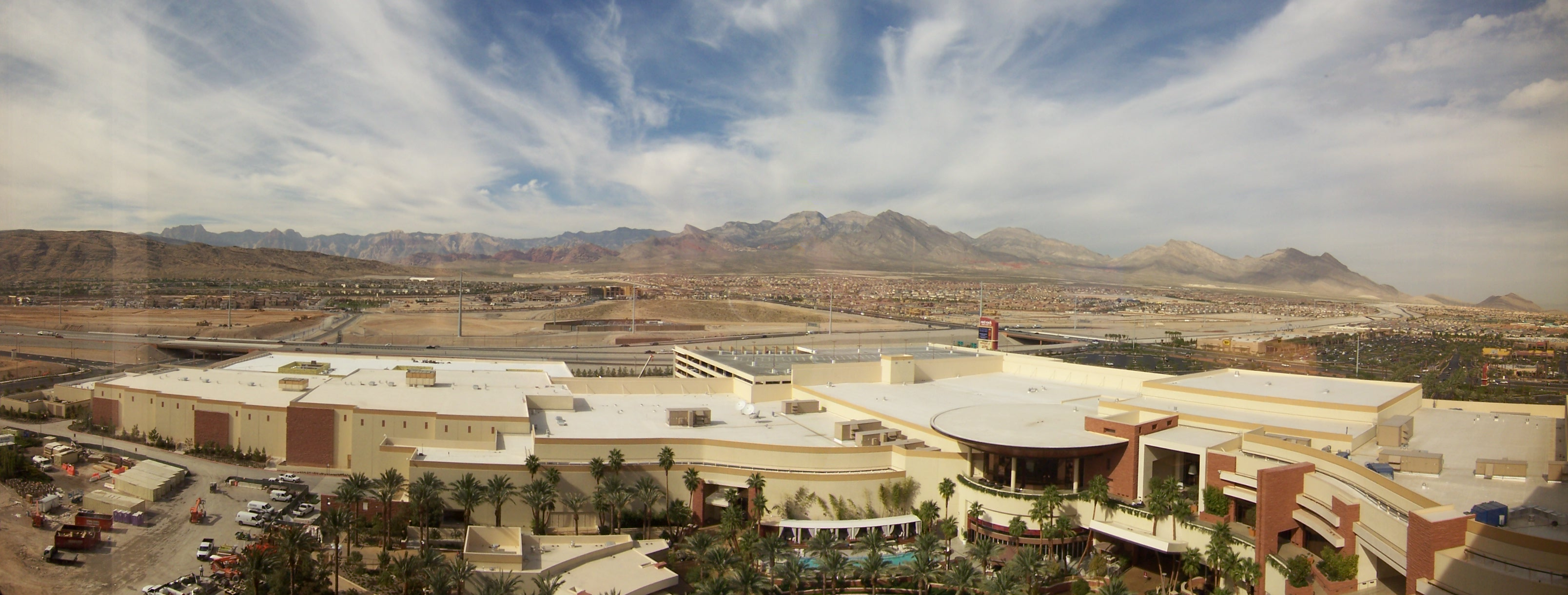
Overview of the Red Rock facilities in 2006

As of July 2006, groundbreaking had begun on a 72-lane bowling alley, while the hotel expansion opened in January 2007. The bowling alley and an additional 1,000 spaces to a parking garage were part of a $65 million expansion, while the additional hotel rooms were included in the resort's original $925 million cost. An expansion to the resort's spa was also planned to open in early 2007, along with the new hotel rooms. The $31 million bowling alley, the most expensive in the world, opened in 2007, and included various amenities including a bar.

In 2007, U.S. presidential candidate Rudy Giuliani held a campaign fundraiser at the resort. After winning the 2010 Nevada gubernatorial election, Brian Sandoval celebrated his victory at the Red Rock Resort. During late 2011, the Red Rock Resort was the only casino in Nevada to offer the "Bonus Box," the name used for cylindrical containers attached to slot machines that dispense prizes to gamblers. At the resort, the cylinders each contained $500 and were attached to 10 different slot machines as part of a field test, which was viewed favorably by customers. After winning the 2012 Nevada caucus, U.S. presidential candidate Mitt Romney held a victory party and speech at the resort. Also during 2012, a 79-year-old woman bowled a perfect 300-score game at the resort's bowling alley, becoming the oldest woman in Nevada history to score a perfect game and the second-oldest woman in U.S. history to do so.

In April 2014, plans were announced for a six-month, $35 million expansion that was scheduled to be complete by October 2014. The upcoming opening of the nearby Downtown Summerlin mall prompted the resort's renovation project. The project would include the addition of a "restaurant row" along the resort building's entrance facing West Charleston Boulevard. Also planned was a new parking and drop-off area across from the mall, as well as an enhanced entrance accessible by mall shoppers. The implementation of easy customer access was inspired by two restaurants at the resort, the Yard House and Lucille's Smokehouse, which both used the same concept of easy access. There were also plans to renovate the 25,000 sq ft (2,300 m^{2}) spa, as well as 26 hotel suites. By the time of the announced expansion, the hotel lobby and the resort's Lucky Bar had already been remodeled. In August 2015, the sportsbook removed a handful of projectors, used since the 2006 opening, and replaced them with an LED video wall measuring 18 feet high and 96 feet long. Most of the hotel rooms were renovated from 2019 to 2020.

In 2019, resort employees voted against unionizing with the Culinary union, after Station introduced new worker incentives and benefits. A federal judge ruled in 2021 that the company's rollout of the benefits was timed to derail Culinary's efforts, and ordered the company to negotiate a contract for Red Rock workers. Station appealed the decision, but it was upheld. A judge for the National Labor Relations Board also ruled in April 2022 that the resort must negotiate with the union. However, contract discussions subsequently stalled.

== Features ==
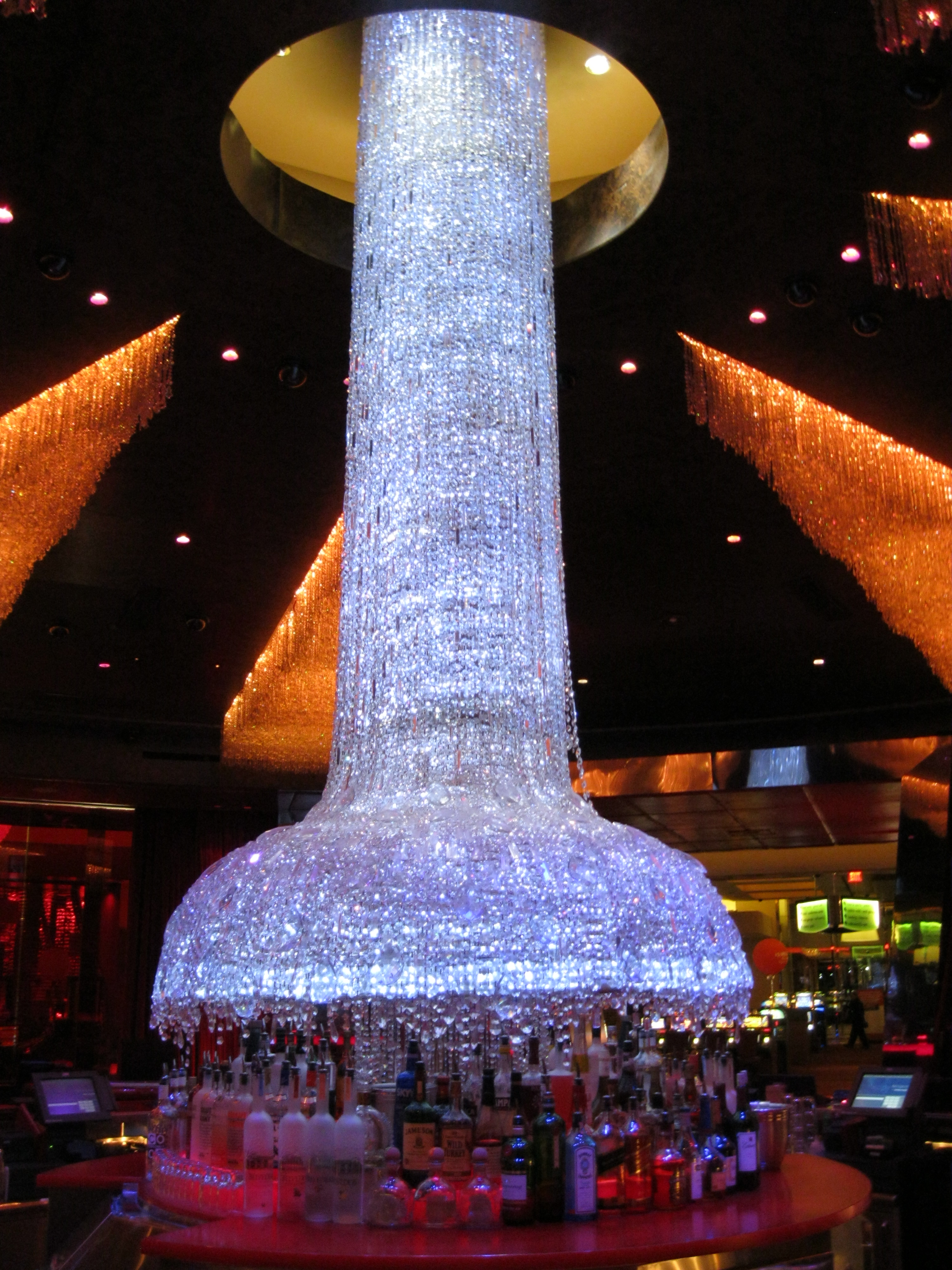
Lucky Bar chandelier

The casino is 118,308 sq ft (10,991.2 m^{2}), while the hotel contains 796 rooms. The resort has a modern design with a desert-themed influence. The resort's design includes blown glass, polished sandstone, and 5,400 sq ft (500 m^{2}) of multicolored onyx imported from India and Italy. The resort also features numerous chandeliers in various shapes and sizes, containing three million pieces of crystal. Station Casinos executives Frank Fertitta III and his brother Lorenzo Fertitta chose to include the chandeliers, having been inspired by older Las Vegas resorts such as the Desert Inn and the Sands Hotel and Casino. The chandeliers cost over $6 million. The Lucky Bar features a chandelier with more than 1.6 million crystals.

=== Restaurants ===
The Red Rock opened with a total of nine restaurants, including T-Bones Chophouse and the Feast Buffet. The resort also included a seven-tenant food court. A Japanese sushi restaurant, Hachi, opened at the resort in 2007. The Yard House opened at the resort in 2010, and its primary entrance was accessible from the resort's parking lot, while a second entrance was located inside the casino. Lucille's Smokehouse opened at the resort in 2013, and it also provided easy customer access similar to the Yard House restaurant.

In February 2014, the resort's Hachi restaurant was closed as part of a routine refreshing of dining options. The resort's LBS: A Burger Joint restaurant also closed that month, after five years of operations. The resort's 2014 expansion was the reason for the closings. Planned as part of the new restaurant row was the Hearthstone Kitchen & Cellar, to be operated by The Light Group in the 5,400 sq ft (500 m^{2}) space formerly occupied by Hachi. Also planned was the renovation of T-Bones Chophouse. Salute, a 4,000 sq ft (370 m^{2}) Italian restaurant, opened in the restaurant row in September 2015. It closed in December 2017, when it was announced that Scott Conant would open a new restaurant, Masso Osteria, in its place with a scheduled opening in February 2018.

The Feast Buffet closed in 2020, due to the COVID-19 pandemic. Lotus of Siam, a local Thai restaurant, opened a new location at the resort in 2022. The 8,000 sq ft (740 m^{2}) restaurant cost more than $5 million to build. In 2023, Lotus of Siam also opened an oyster bar and Greek restaurant at the resort.

=== Musical entertainment ===
When the resort opened, it featured Rande Gerber's 8,500 sq ft (790 m^{2}) Cherry Nightclub, which included a seven-foot sculpture of red cherries created by Takashi Murakami. The resort also included the Rocks Lounge, which offered singing entertainment; the 250-seat Lucky Bar, which offered nightly DJ music; and the pool area's Sand Bar, which offered concert acts.

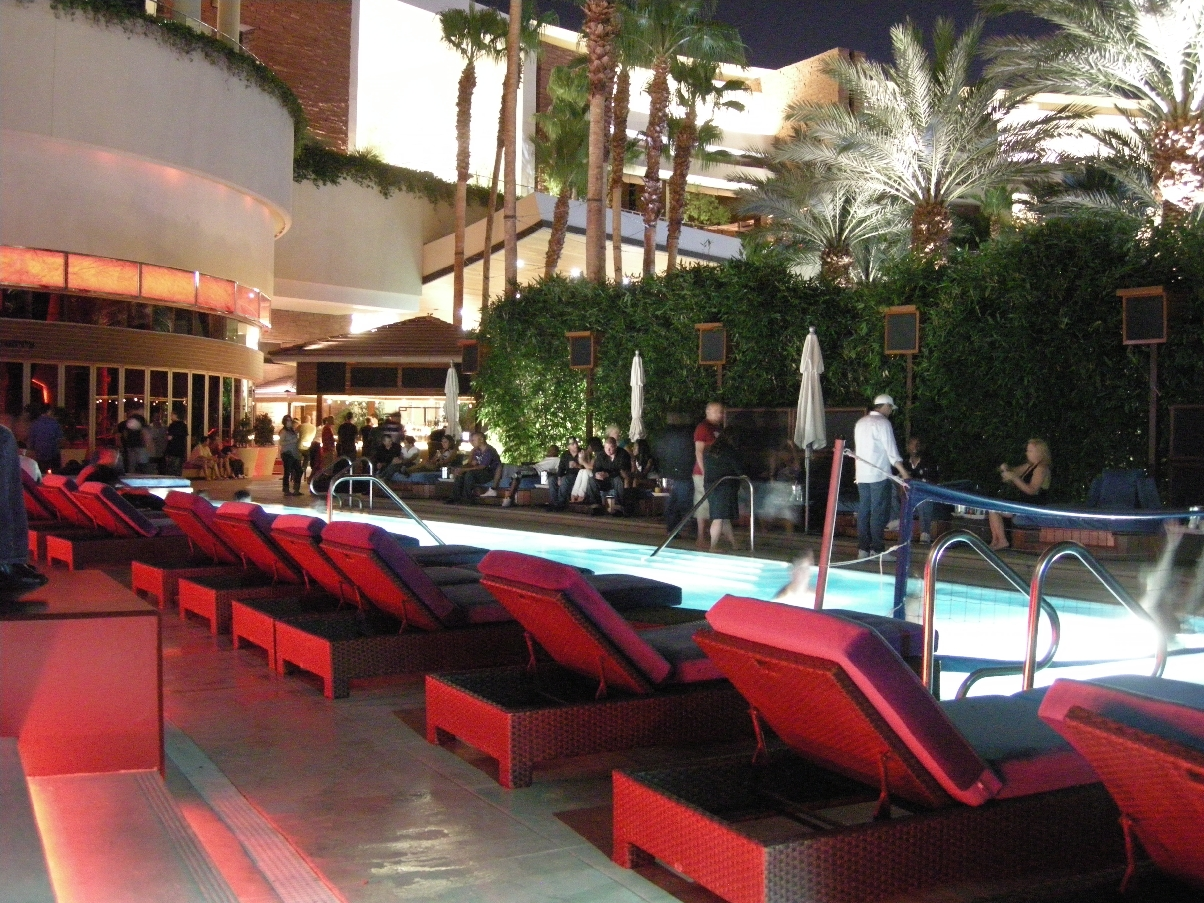
Pool party at the resort's Cherry Pool, July 2009

In 2007, Station Casinos took over operations at the Cherry nightclub, after parting ways with Gerber. The Cherry nightclub reopened in June 2009, after a remodeling that included the addition of a stage. At that time, Cherry consisted of 13,000 sq ft (1,200 m^{2}), including an outdoor area with a pool, known as Cherry Pool during the summer. Cherry also included a DJ, and was meant to appeal to local residents through promotions. Cherry closed in January 2010, and Station Casinos began evaluating better uses for the space that would bring in more profits. It was ultimately converted into event space, and the Cherry Pool reopened in May 2010, as the Red Rock Cabana Club, a 275-person pool area separate from the main pool where guests could have pool parties.

In May 2011, work was underway on a temporary, outdoor amphitheater near the resort's pool. The 8,800-seat venue would host six concerts that year, from June to October, before being dismantled. During 2012, the resort's outdoor amphitheater had grown to nearly 10,000 seats, becoming one of the largest concert venues in Las Vegas. The Red Rock Amphitheater hosted its final concert in October 2012. In 2013, the Academy of Country Music named Red Rock Resort as the Casino of the Year for hosting many country singers during 2012. In March 2014, the resort announced a concert series planned for the summer, to be held at the Sandbar pool area.

In 2015, the resort began offering Rock Shot Bingo, a version of bingo featuring alcohol and a DJ, to appeal to younger customers. Zowie Bowie, a cover band, performed at the Rocks Lounge for nearly 10 years, from the resort's opening until January 2016. A dance show titled Alice: A Steampunk Concert Fantasy, based on the books Alice in Wonderland and Through the Looking-Glass, began at the Rocks Lounge in July 2017.

== Film history ==
The second season of Hell's Kitchen, aired in 2006, offered the winner the executive chef position at T-Bones Chophouse. The winner of the contest was a 25-year-old sous chef from New York named Heather West, but Red Rock management instead decided to give her a position suitable to her skills: senior chef at Terra Rossa, the resort's Italian restaurant. Portions of the show were filmed at the resort. By August 2008, the resort had been the filming location for segments of The Late Late Show with Craig Ferguson and episodes of The Real Housewives of Orange County, as well as Rock of Love with Bret Michaels. Rapper Nelly's music video for "Body on Me" was also shot at the resort in 2008. Some scenes were also shot at the resort for the 2008 film 21.

== Canceled condominium towers ==
In July 2005, Station Casinos announced that it was partnering with developers Stephen Cloobeck and Steven Molasky to build two condominium high-rise towers on 8 acres (3.2 ha) of property next to the Red Rock Resort. The towers would be under 190 feet and would include 300 units each for a total of 600. They would be 80 percent owned by Station Casinos, while Cloobeck Molasky Partners I LLC would own the remainder. Sales were expected to begin in spring 2006. By March 2006, Station Casinos was planning two 227-foot condominium towers with a total of 392 units. According to a Clark County commissioner, the previously approved 198-foot limit only applied to the adjacent hotel. Despite the increased height, the towers would be built on land that was 29 feet lower in elevation from the hotel tower, making them no taller than the hotel's rooftop. In April 2006, the Clark County Commission unanimously granted zoning approval to Charleston Station LLC – mostly owned by Station Casinos – to build the condominium project, despite some citizens' opposition to its height.

A sales center for the project was opened inside the Red Rock Resort. The project was known as Red Rock Residences and The Residences at Red Rock. Station Casinos dissolved the partnership with Cloobeck and Molasky in June 2006, and planned to develop the project on its own, with completion expected by 2008. Cloobeck Molasky requested arbitration on the matter in July 2006, as well as damages from Station Casinos. Cloobeck accused Station Casinos of attempting to "hijack" the project. In September 2006, Station Casinos announced that it was considering alternative possibilities for the land. A condominium on the property was still in consideration, as Station Casinos believed it to be a viable concept; approximately 3,000 people had previously expressed interest in the project at its preview center. The condominium project had been scheduled for groundbreaking around October 2006, but was ultimately cancelled.

== Gallery ==
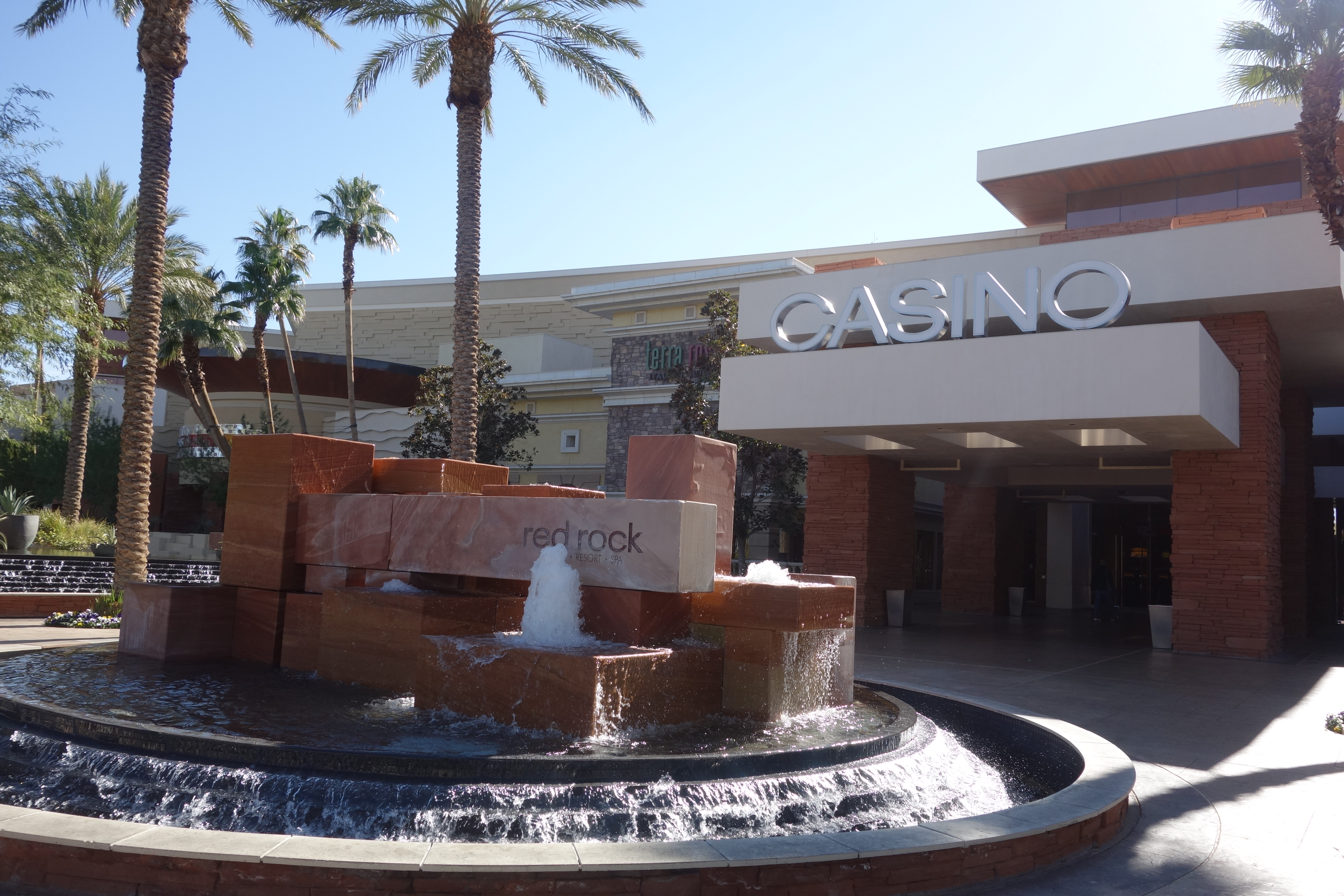
The northern, main entrance

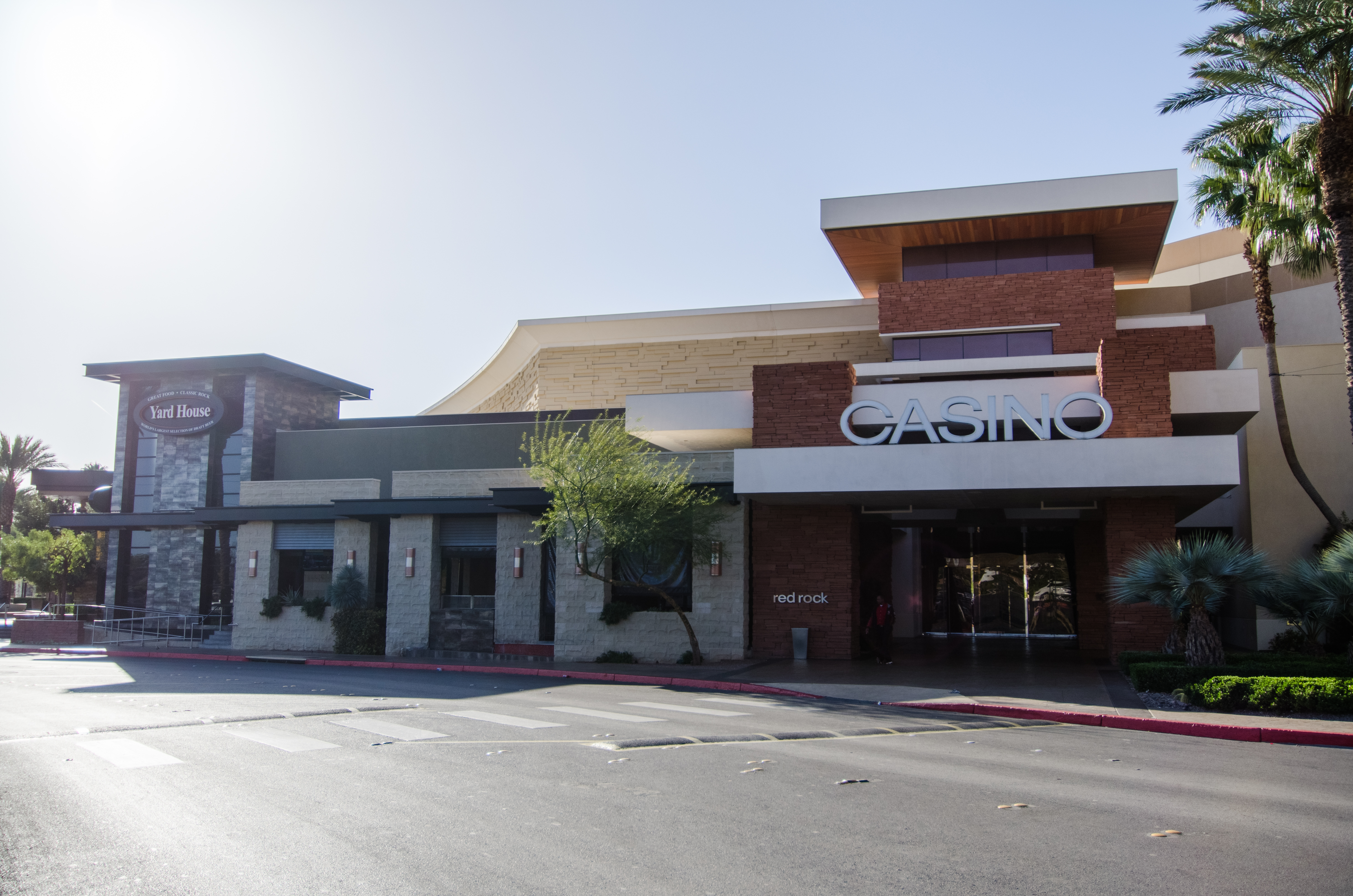
Yard House next to the casino's northwest entrance

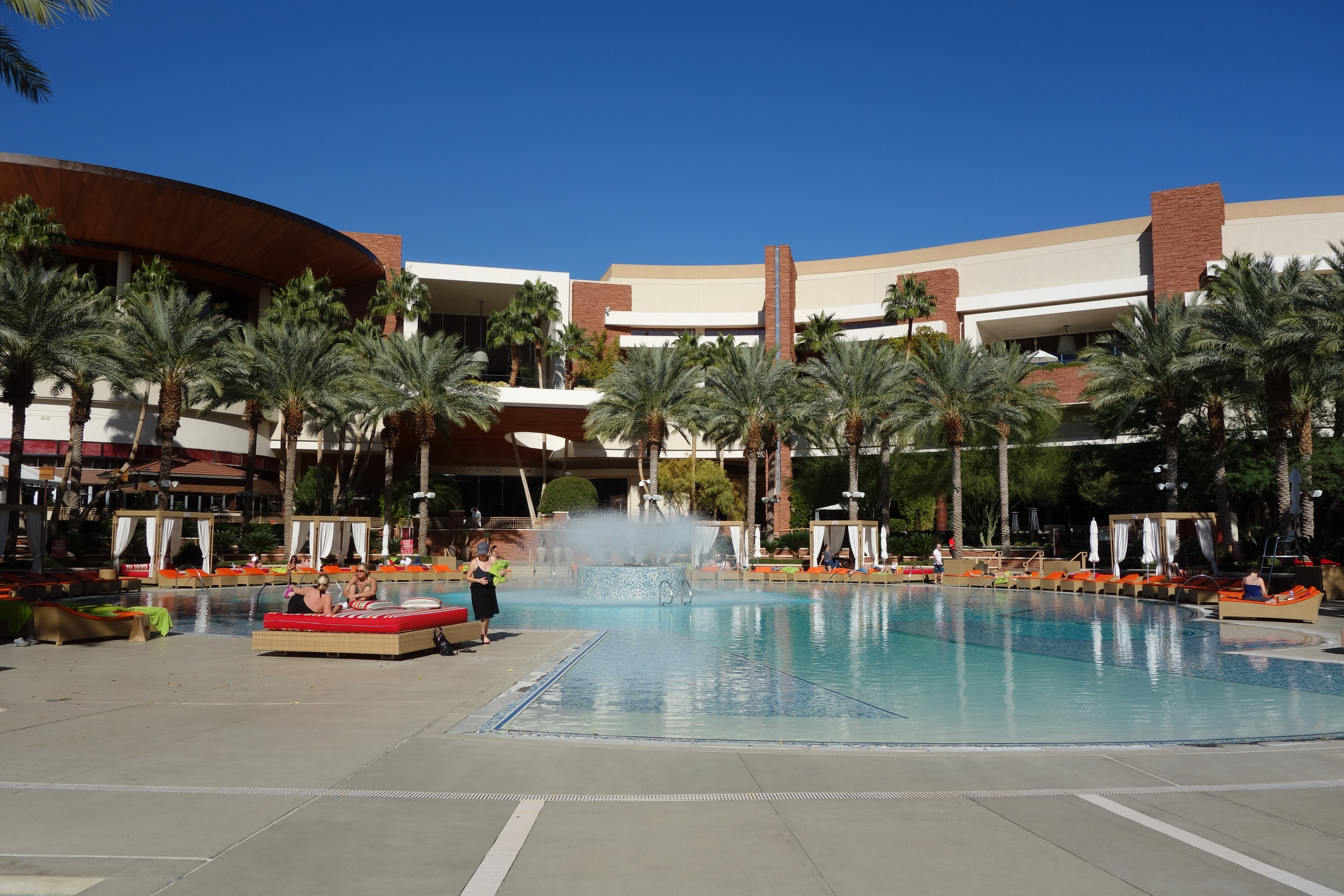
Pool area

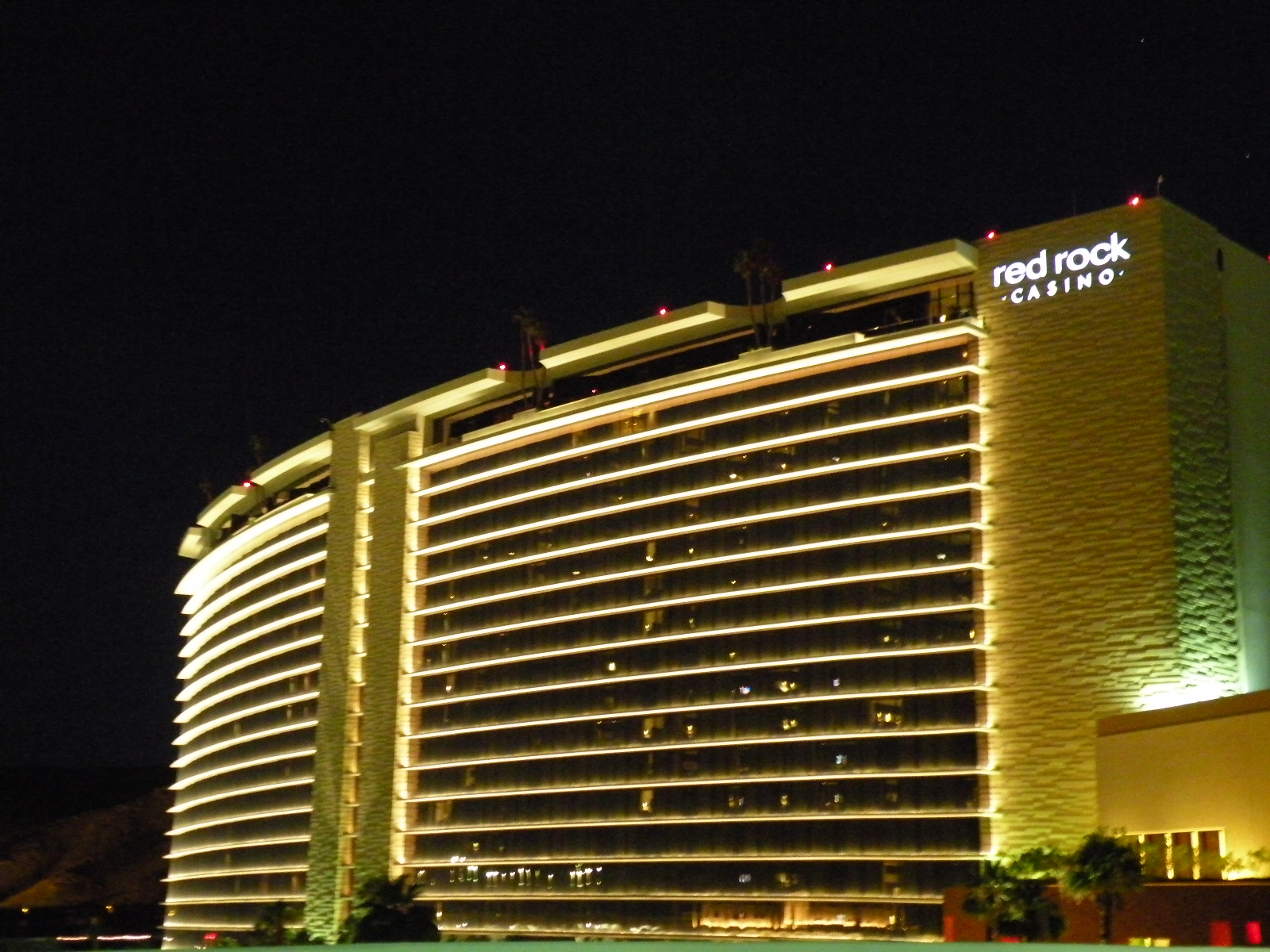
Hotel tower at night

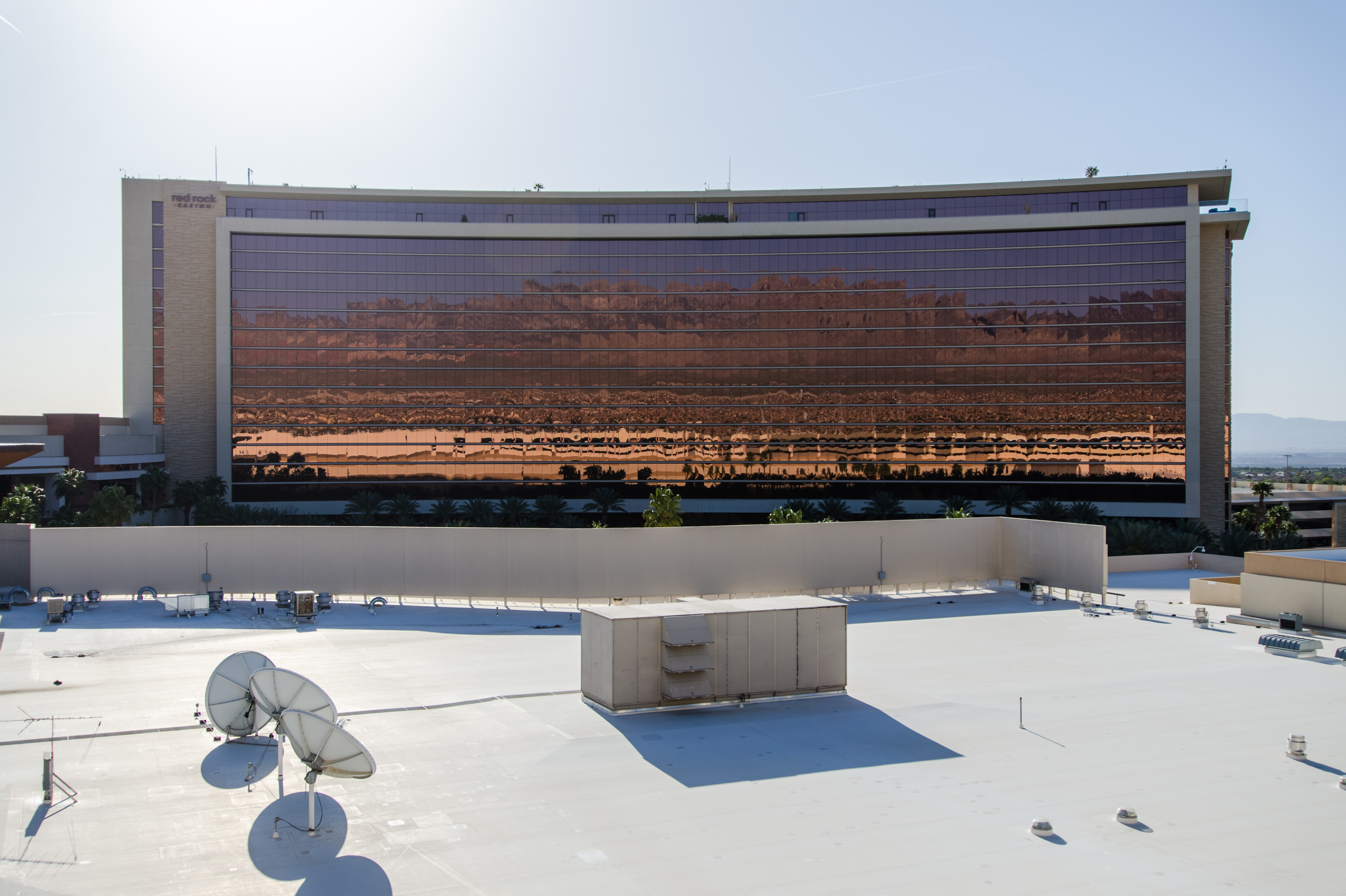
Looking east at the hotel tower
