= Incline Village, Nevada =

- Census-designated place
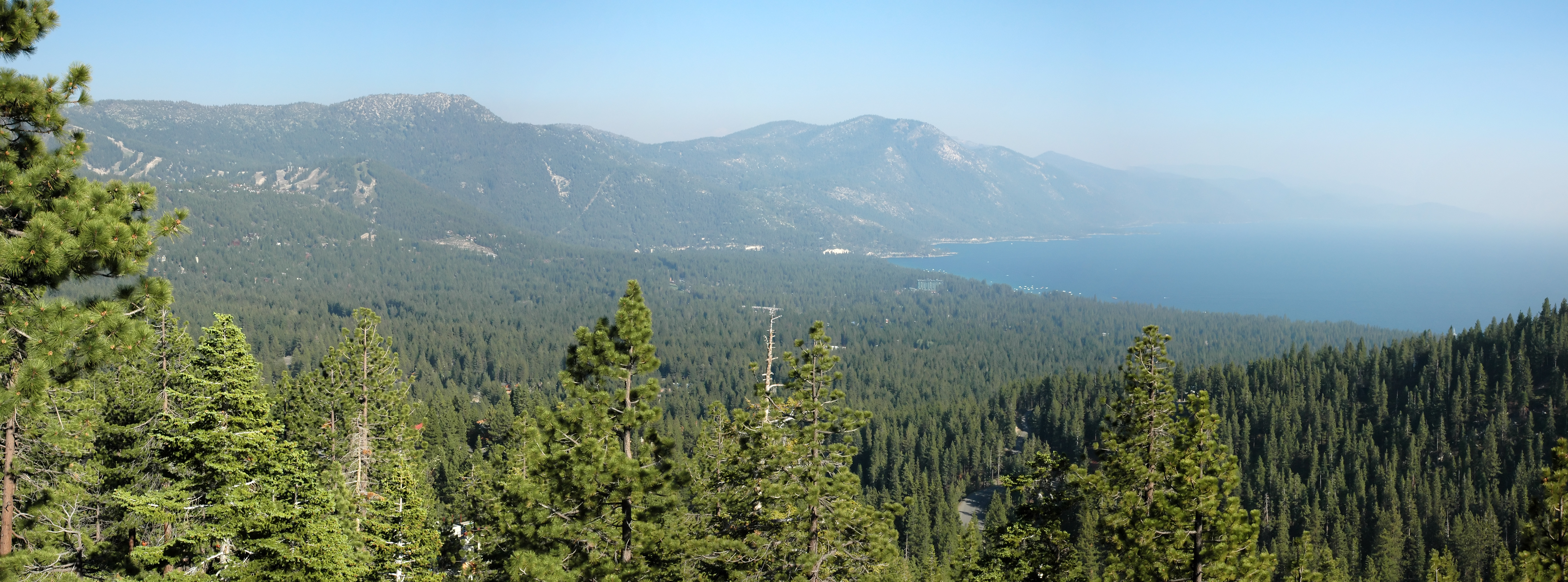

- Location of Incline Village, Nevada

- Location within Nevada Location within the United States
- Coordinates: 39°14′45″N 119°57′0″W
- Country: United States
- State: Nevada

Area
  - Total: 21.66 sq mi (56.11 km^{2})
  - Land: 21.51 sq mi (55.71 km^{2})
  - Water: 0.15 sq mi (0.39 km^{2})
- Elevation: 6,350 ft (1,940 m)

Population (2020)
  - Total: 9,462
  - Density: 439.9/sq mi (169.84/km^{2})
- Time zone: UTC−8 (Pacific (PST))
  - Summer (DST): UTC−7 (PDT)
- ZIP code: 89451
- Area code: 775
- FIPS code: 32-35100
- GNIS feature ID: 2652365

Incline Village is an upmarket census-designated place (CDP) on the north shore of Lake Tahoe in Washoe County, Nevada, United States. As of the 2020 census, Incline Village had a population of 9,462. It is part of the Reno−Sparks Metropolitan Statistical Area. Until the 2010 census, the CDP Crystal Bay, Nevada was counted jointly with Incline Village. It is governed by the Incline Village General Improvement District (IVGID), a quasi-public agency that provides water, sewer, trash and recreation services for Incline Village and Crystal Bay, Nevada.

Sierra Nevada University, now The University of Nevada, Reno at Lake Tahoe, is located in Incline Village. Incline Village is also home to Diamond Peak Ski Resort, which is owned by the community. Incline Village has some of the most expensive real estate in the United States.

== History ==
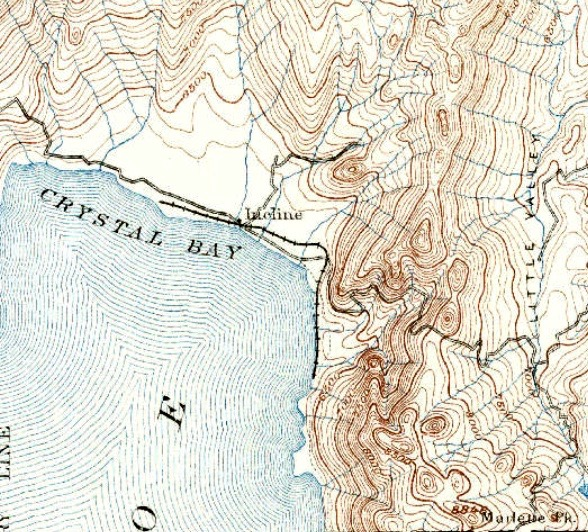
Sierra Nevada Wood and Lumber Company rail line in 1891

Incline Village was established in 1882 with a post office opening February 7, 1884.

=== Sierra Nevada Wood and Lumber Company ===
The Sierra Nevada Wood and Lumber Company (SNW&L) was a logging company that operated on the northeast side of Lake Tahoe at what is today known as Incline Village, which was named after the SNW&L incline railway that served the area. Timber was required for the mines during the mining boom in the late 1800s of the nearby Comstock Lode in Virginia City. The timber around Lake Tahoe was placed on the incline railway where it was taken up 1,400 feet (430 m) and then dropped by a gravity flume down the western side of mountain to a 3,000 feet (910 m) tunnel to Carson City. The company operated a number of other railroad lines that were 3 ft (914 mm) narrow gauge and standard gauge.

== Geography ==
The town center is 6,350 feet (1,940 m) above sea level.

According to the United States Census Bureau, the CDP has a total area of 21.7 square miles (56.3 km^{2}), of which 21.5 square miles (55.8 km^{2}) is land and 0.19 square miles (0.5 km^{2}), or 0.97%, is water.

Several creeks cross Incline Village on the way to Crystal Bay in Lake Tahoe. Heading east from Stateline Point, these include First, Second and Third Creeks, then Incline Creek and finally Mill Creek at the eastern end.

== Life and culture ==
The town has 9 private sandy beaches on Lake Tahoe, including Burnt Cedar Beach, 5 ski resorts, twenty community golf courses, a recreation center, as well as parks and an events center.

Major community events include the Ullr Festival supporting the Diamond Peak Ski Team, Fourth of July Fireworks, and a large number of other fundraisers.

== Demographics ==
Historical population
Census	Pop.	Note	%±
2000	9,952		—
2010	8,777		−11.8%
2020	9,462		7.8%
U.S. Decennial Census

=== 2020 census ===
As of the 2020 census, Incline Village had a population of 9,462. The median age was 51.7 years. 15.2% of residents were under the age of 18 and 26.4% of residents were 65 years of age or older. For every 100 females there were 107.9 males, and for every 100 females age 18 and over there were 108.5 males age 18 and over.

Racial composition as of the 2020 census
Race	Number	Percent
White	7,351	77.7%
Black or African American	31	0.3%
American Indian and Alaska Native	53	0.6%
Asian	227	2.4%
Native Hawaiian and Other Pacific Islander	17	0.2%
Some other race	658	7.0%
Two or more races	1,125	11.9%
Hispanic or Latino (of any race)	1,515	16.0%

93.8% of residents lived in urban areas, while 6.2% lived in rural areas.

There were 4,167 households in Incline Village, of which 20.0% had children under the age of 18 living in them. Of all households, 54.2% were married-couple households, 21.4% were households with a male householder and no spouse or partner present, and 18.1% were households with a female householder and no spouse or partner present. About 26.0% of all households were made up of individuals and 12.9% had someone living alone who was 65 years of age or older.

There were 7,367 housing units, of which 43.4% were vacant. The homeowner vacancy rate was 3.5% and the rental vacancy rate was 16.3%.

=== 2010 census ===
At the 2010 census, there were 8,777 people, 3,765 households and 2,335 families residing in the CDP. The population density was 408.2 per square mile (157.6/km^{2}). There were 7,667 housing units at an average density of 356.6 per square mile (137.7/km^{2}). The racial make-up of the CDP was 86.9% White, 0.3% African American, 0.3% Native American, 2.2% Asian, 0.1% Pacific Islander, 8.1% some other race and 2.1% from two or more races. Hispanic or Latino of any race were 17.8% of the population.

There were 3,765 households, of which 21.9% had children under the age of 18 living with them, 53.4% were headed by married couples living together, 4.6% had a female householder with no husband present and 38.0% were non-families. 26.2% of all households were made up of individuals, and 8.0% were someone living alone who was 65 years of age or older. The average household size was 2.29 and the average family size was 2.74.

17.2% of the population were under the age of 18, 8.8% from 18 to 24, 23.0% from 25 to 44, 33.4% from 45 to 64 and 17.7% were 65 years of age or older. The median age was 45.7 years. For every 100 females there were 107.5 males. For every 100 females age 18 and over, there were 108.6 males.

Before 2010, the CDP was listed as "Incline Village–Crystal Bay, Nevada" by the U.S. Census Bureau. Crystal Bay, with a population of 305, became its own CDP for the 2010 census.

=== Income and poverty ===
For the period 2007–2011, the estimated median household income in the CDP was $78,375 and the median family income was $93,831. Males had a median income of $55,693 and females $47,993. The per capita income was $54,787. About 2.8% of families and 5.7% of the population were below the poverty line, including 3.1% of those under age 18 and 7.0% of those age 65 or over.

=== Media ===
The local newspaper is the Tahoe Daily Tribune which is published on Fridays.

== Climate ==
Incline Village has a humid continental climate (Dfb) with warm to hot summers with cool nights and moderately cold winters with frigid nights.

Climate data for Incline Village–Crystal Bay, Nevada
Month	Jan	Feb	Mar	Apr	May	Jun	Jul	Aug	Sep	Oct	Nov	Dec	Year
Mean daily maximum °F (°C)	39.4 (4.1)	40.6 (4.8)	44.2 (6.8)	49.3 (9.6)	58.1 (14.5)	65.7 (18.7)	73.2 (22.9)	73.4 (23.0)	68.4 (20.2)	59.7 (15.4)	49.5 (9.7)	42.1 (5.6)	55.3 (12.9)
Mean daily minimum °F (°C)	22.5 (−5.3)	22.7 (−5.2)	25.9 (−3.4)	29.3 (−1.5)	35.0 (1.7)	42.7 (5.9)	49.1 (9.5)	49.0 (9.4)	43.3 (6.3)	34.6 (1.4)	28.6 (−1.9)	22.3 (−5.4)	33.8 (1.0)
Average precipitation inches (mm)	2.95 (75)	3.19 (81)	2.48 (63)	1.38 (35)	1.80 (46)	1.03 (26)	0.37 (9.4)	0.60 (15)	0.97 (25)	2.14 (54)	3.22 (82)	2.96 (75)	23.09 (586.4)
Source: National Weather Service

== Education ==
The area is served by the Washoe County School District. Public schools in the CDP are Incline Elementary, Middle, and High School (public, K–12). The Lake Tahoe School is a private school for grades K–8.

The University of Nevada, Reno at Lake Tahoe, formerly Sierra Nevada University, is located in Incline. Lake Tahoe's only science museum and environmental research laboratories are operated by the UC Davis Tahoe Environmental Research Center in Incline Village.

Incline Village has a public library, a branch of the Washoe County Library.

== Tax haven ==
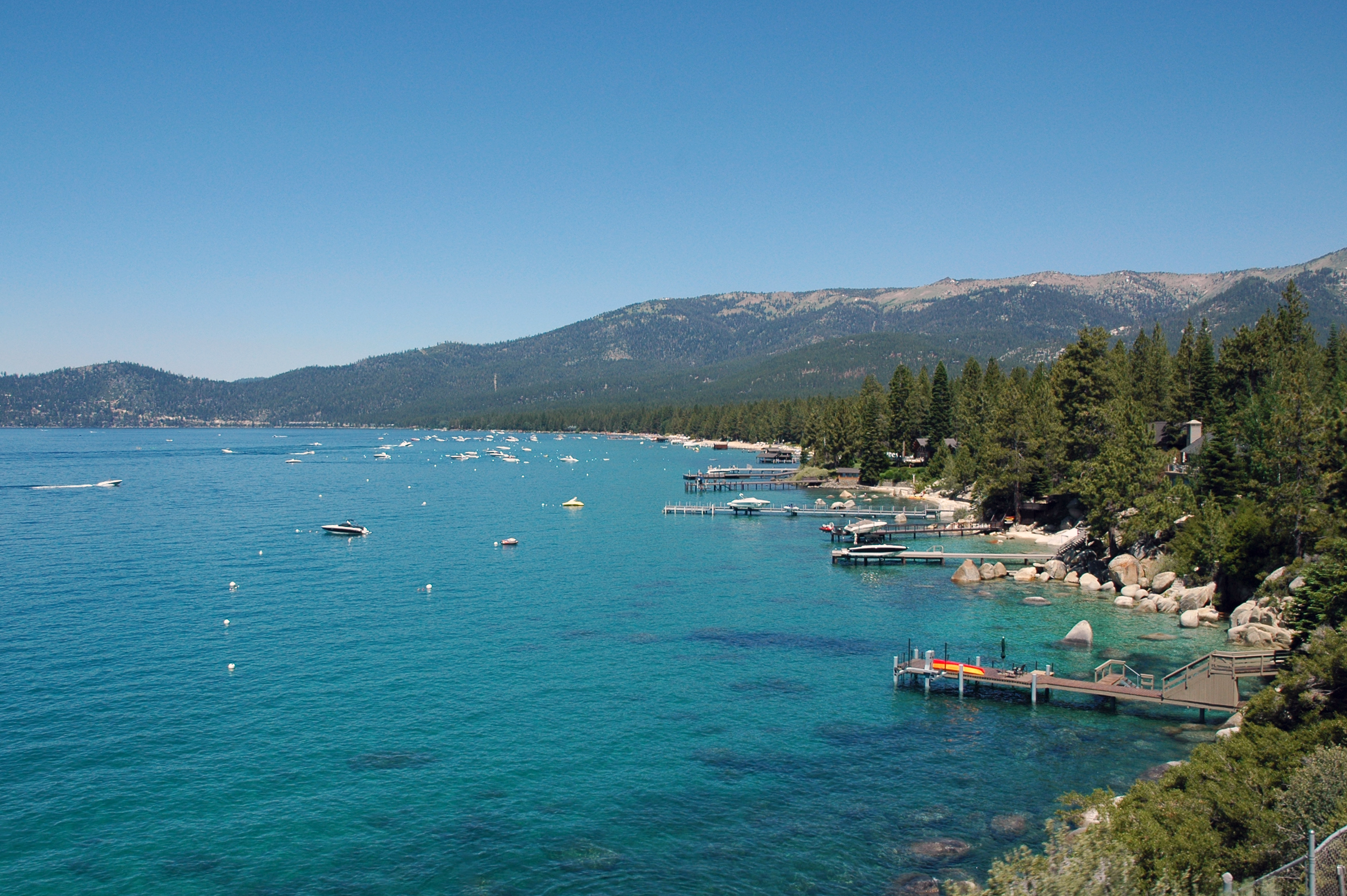
Private boat docks on Lake Tahoe.

The town includes businesses and wealthy individuals from California and Southern Nevada. Its state border location facilitates some residents in their registering shell corporations and residences to avoid paying California taxes. A Montara, California, politician faced controversy for reporting Incline as her primary residence for tax purposes while also running for office in California.

Joe Francis, creator of Girls Gone Wild, was registered as a resident in Incline but living in Los Angeles during the time he was found guilty of tax fraud and bribery. Michael DeDomenico, heir of the Rice-A-Roni and Ghirardelli fortune, was charged with evading $1.5 million in taxes to California by falsely claiming residency in Nevada. He owned homes in Verdi and Incline.

== Notable residents ==
- Lloyd Bryan Molander Adams, director and producer
- Dale Brown, novelist, former U.S. Air Force pilot
- Warren Buffett, businessman, owned a home here in the 1980s
- Stu Cook, former bassist for Creedence Clearwater Revival
- David Coverdale, founder/lead singer of Whitesnake and former lead singer of Deep Purple
- Trent Dilfer, former NFL quarterback and football analyst for NFL on Fox
- David Duffield, chairman of Workday, Inc., former chairman of PeopleSoft
- Larry Ellison, former CEO of Oracle Corporation.
- John Force, National Hot Rod Association (NHRA) Championship Funny Car driver
- Joe Francis, founder of Mantra Films, Inc. aka Girls Gone Wild
- Brent Jones, former Pro Bowl tight end for the San Francisco 49ers
- Jerome Lemelson, inventor and philanthropist
- Mike Love, lead singer of The Beach Boys
- Michael Milken, financier and philanthropist, pleaded guilty to securities and tax violations
- Bill Miller, Major League Baseball umpire
- Charles H. Moore, inventor of the Forth programming language
- Aaron Rodgers, quarterback for the Pittsburgh Steelers
- George Seifert, former head coach for the San Francisco 49ers
- Annika Sörenstam, professional golfer
- Ken Wilber, author

== See also ==
- List of census-designated places in Nevada
