= Obscenity Prosecution Task Force =

The Obscenity Prosecution Task Force (OPTF) was an organization created in 2005 by the United States Department of Justice. The OPTF's job was to investigate and prosecute producers and distributors of hardcore pornography that meets the legal tests for obscenity, as defined by the Supreme Court of the United States. The group was led by U.S. Attorney Brent Ward.

The task force was formed during the Presidency of George W. Bush to investigate hardcore pornography at the urging of social conservative groups. Notable cases were brought against Joseph R. Francis' Mantra Films, Inc. (Girls Gone Wild), as well as producers Ira Isaacs, John Stagliano, and Max Hardcore.

Eric Holder, Barack Obama's appointee for United States Attorney General, dissolved the task force in spring 2011, leaving obscenity prosecutions to the United States Department of Justice Criminal Division's Child Exploitation and Obscenity Section.
