= Rich & Shameless =

American true crime documentary series

- Genre: Documentary; True crime
- Directed by: Jenny Popplewell; Sam Miller; Katinka Newman
- Country of origin: United States
- Original language: English
- No. of seasons: 3
- No. of episodes: 15

Production
- Executive producer: Glenn Barden
- Producer: Tom Lindley
- Running time: 45–50 minutes
- Production company: Raw TV

Original release
- Network: TNT

Rich & Shameless is an American true crime documentary television series airing on TNT and Max. All the crimes involve rich people, either as victims or perpetrators. It's an anthology of films. Each episode features a different crime story, rather than one story told over multiple episodes. Each film has a different tone and style.

The first season, with seven episodes, aired in 2022. The second season aired Spring 2023. The first season featured crime stories involving rich and famous people. Stories included the real tale of the Pamela Anderson sex tape; an expose of Joe Francis, who was behind the Girls Gone Wild franchise; and a feud between Wu Tang Clan and Martin Shkreli. The second series focused exclusively on sports crime stories. Episodes included the story of the manager who stole Dennis Rodman's fortune, and the tale of the Hulk Hogan sex tape and his subsequent suing of Gawker.

== Episodes ==
Overview of Rich & Shameless seasons
Season	Episodes	Originally released
1	7	February 19, 2022
2	4	May 7, 2023
3	4	May 20, 2024 or May 22, 2024

No.	Title	Directed by	Written by	Original release date
1	"The Crime Against Pam & Tommy"	Jenny Popplewell	Unknown	February 19, 2022
The bizarre true story behind the Pamela Anderson sex tape. Contrary to popular belief Anderson did not release it herself. It was stolen.
2	"Girls Gone Wild Exposed"	Katinka Blackford Newman; Jessica Burgess	Unknown	April 23, 2022
Feature length episode exposing the crimes of Girls Gone Wild founder Joe Francis. Includes allegations of rape and domestic abuse.
3	"Pharma Bros vs Wu Tang Clan"	Jenny Popplewell	Unknown	May 8, 2022
Poor boy dreams of being rich. Becomes America’s Most Hated Man. His millions don’t buy him respect so he tries to get it from the world of rap. The plan backfires.
4	"Where Did NBA Star Brian Williams Go?"	Sebastian Smith	Unknown	May 18, 2022
At the height of his fame Bison Dele, formally known as Brian Williams, walked away from basketball. But where did he go? Was he murdered?
5	"The Mysterious Disappearance of the Bitcoin Millionaire"	Sam Miller	Unknown	May 20, 2022
The secret life and mysterious death of Canada’s Crypto King. And the hunt for the missing millions.
6	"The Heiress & The Sex Cult"	Sam Miller	Unknown	May 22, 2022
From Seagram’s heiress to felon – the inside story of Clare Bronfman and her funding of the NXVIM sex cult.
7	"Peter Nygaard's Unseen Tapes"	Sebastian Smith; Jessica Burgess	Unknown	May 24, 2022
Disgraced Canadian fashion tycoon Peter Nygaard and his bizarre quest to live forever.

== Reception ==
Season 1 was received positively, with The Daily Beast praising the Girls Gone Wild episode for providing a "a venue for multiple Francis victims to explicate his underhanded tactics, and to express their hurt and anger over being featured in videos—if not plastered on their packaging—without having been first given a clear understanding of what they were signing up for."
