= Follow This =

American docu-series from BuzzFeed on Netflix

- Genre: Documentary
- Starring: John Stanton; Scaachi Koul; Azeen Ghorayshi; Bim Adewunmi; Juliane Löffler; Charlie Warzel
- Original language: English (Note: With some dialogue in German on the episode Intersex, as well as Spanish on the episodes Rehab Tourism and Gánster Rap)
- No. of seasons: 3
- No. of episodes: 20

Production
- Executive producers: Jessica Harrop; Shani Hilton; Linzee Troubh; Cindy Vanegas-Gesuale; Jason Spingarn-Koff; Kate Townsend; Lisa Nishimura
- Producer: John Pappas
- Cinematography: Joshua Weinstein
- Editor: David Herr
- Running time: 15–20 minutes
- Production company: BuzzFeed News

Original release
- Network: Netflix
- Release: August 23 – November 1, 2018

Follow This is an American documentary television series produced by BuzzFeed. The show was released on Netflix on August 23, 2018. Netflix ordered 20 episodes, initially releasing the first seven episodes in August 2018, with seven more in September and six more in November. Each episode of the show focuses on a different topic, with episode subjects including intersex, men's rights, and ASMR. Episodes are hosted by BuzzFeed reporters. The series was not renewed for a second season.

== Hosts ==
- John Stanton
- Scaachi Koul
- Azeen Ghorayshi
- Bim Adewunmi
- Juliane Löffler
- Charlie Warzel

== Episodes ==
=== Part 1 (2018) ===
| No. overall | No. in season | Title | Original release date |
|---|---|---|---|
| 1 | 1 | "The Internet Whisperers" | August 23, 2018 |
Scaachi Koul examines the online trend of ASMR videos.
| 2 | 2 | "Black Survivalists" | August 23, 2018 |
Bim Adewunmi interviews a group of black survivalists who help train people of color how to survive potential disasters.
| 3 | 3 | "Intersex" | August 23, 2018 |
Juliane Löffler talks to a German intersex community about gender surgery and legal status.
| 4 | 4 | "Men's Rights" | August 23, 2018 |
Scaachi Koul investigates the phenomenon of "men's rights activists" and its supporters.
| 5 | 5 | "Life Support" | August 23, 2018 |
Azeen Ghorayshi reports on the Opioid epidemic, looking at the increase in safe injection sites.
| 6 | 6 | "Whores Day" | August 23, 2018 |
John Stanton sits down with sex trafficking survivors as they discuss legislation intended to protect them, and its impact on sex workers.
| 7 | 7 | "The Future of Fakes" | August 23, 2018 |
Charlie Warzel explores the future of fake news, and the technology behind "deepfakes".

=== Part 2 (2018) ===
| No. overall | No. in season | Title | Original release date |
|---|---|---|---|
| 8 | 1 | "Tech Addict" | September 27, 2018 |
| 9 | 2 | "Teen Boss" | September 27, 2018 |
| 10 | 3 | "Bollywood Beauty" | September 27, 2018 |
| 11 | 4 | "Amish Romance" | September 27, 2018 |
| 12 | 5 | "Whose Embryos?" | September 27, 2018 |
| 13 | 6 | "A Deadly Prank" | September 27, 2018 |
| 14 | 7 | "Rehab Tourism" | September 27, 2018 |

=== Part 3 (2018) ===
| No. overall | No. in season | Title | Original release date |
|---|---|---|---|
| 15 | 1 | "Scooter Wars" | November 1, 2018 |
| 16 | 2 | "Cover-up Couture" | November 1, 2018 |
| 17 | 3 | "Sexbots" | November 1, 2018 |
| 18 | 4 | "Superbug Snipers" | November 1, 2018 |
| 19 | 5 | "India's Utopia" | November 1, 2018 |
| 20 | 6 | "Gánster Rap" | November 1, 2018 |
