= Scaachi Koul =

Canadian writer (born 1991)

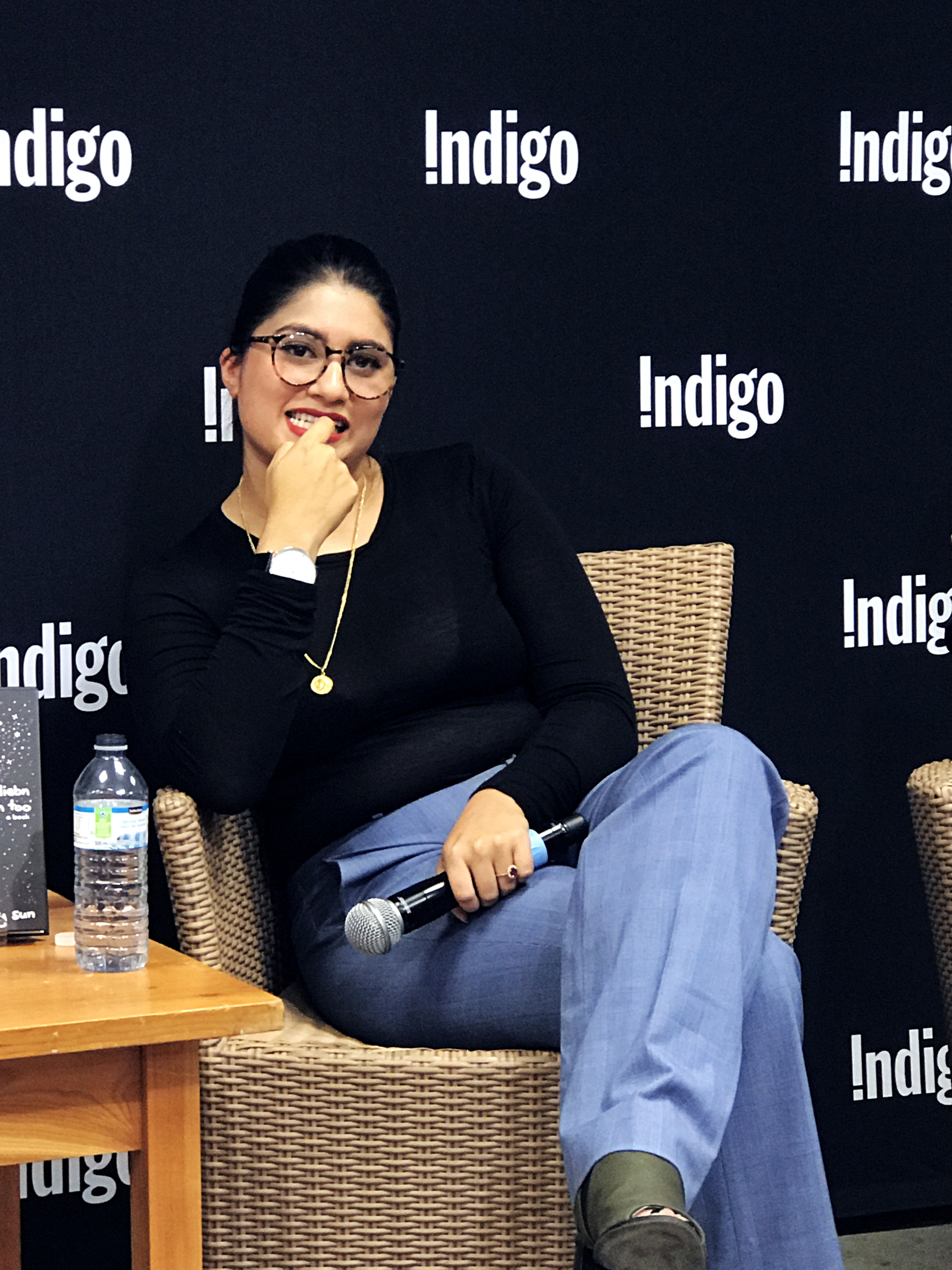
- Koul at a book reading in Toronto in 2017
- Born: February 7, 1991 (age 35); Calgary, Alberta, Canada
- Education: Ryerson University
- Occupation: Writer

Scaachi Koul (born February 7, 1991) is a Canadian culture writer who has written for BuzzFeed Canada and Slate. She is the author of the book of essays One Day We'll All Be Dead and None of This Will Matter and was one of the reporters in BuzzFeed's Netflix documentary series Follow This. Before BuzzFeed, Koul worked at Penguin Random House Canada, the acquiring publisher of her book. Her writing has appeared in Flare, HuffPost Canada, The Thought Catalog, The Guardian, The New Yorker, The New York Times, The Globe and Mail, and other publications.

== Career ==
Koul freelanced while still at the Ryerson School of Journalism where she wrote for Maclean's from 2009 up until her graduation at the end of 2012. From April to November 2014 Koul wrote the "Unf*ck Yourself" column for Hazlitt. In 2015, her column was rebranded "Scaach-22" with the new tagline "managing your own privilege without being a dick".

In March 2015, while Koul was still employed by Penguin Random House Canada, they announced publication of a collection of her essays. Originally the collection was titled The Pursuit of Misery then it was changed to One Day We'll All Be Dead and None of This Will Matter. The book covers subjects including family, race, feminism, body image, and rape culture from her perspective as an Indian-Canadian woman growing up in the suburbs of Calgary. She also discusses her writing career and social media, including temporarily deactivating her Twitter account as a result of invective and threats following a request for long-form submissions from people who were "not white and not male". Koul was praised for her wit and humour, ability to mix sarcasm and sentimentality, and for her effective use of confessional writing as a complement to analytical rigour. She received a shortlisted nomination for the 2018 Stephen Leacock Award for the best book of humour written in English by a Canadian writer.

She hosts the Scamfluencers podcast with Sarah Hagi, which covers scammers who are influencers. Scamfluencers won the Ambie award in 2023 for best podcast covering the entertainment industry.

She also co-hosts a BBC production podcast Where to be a woman with Sophia Smith Galer.

In March 2024, she appeared in 4 episodes of the Nickelodeon documentary Quiet on Set: The Dark Side of Kids TV as a consultant.

As of 2024, Slate lists Koul as a senior writer.

=== Girls Gone Wild: The Untold Story ===
In May 2023, Koul revealed in a Huffington Post article that she was investigating the now-shuttered pornographic film franchise Girls Gone Wild and its founder Joe Francis. She also revealed that she had interviewed Francis for nine hours at a home he had in Punta Mita, Mexico. In December 2024, the three episode series Girls Gone Wild: The Untold Story, a documentary detailing Koul's investigation of Girls Gone Wild and Francis, became available to stream on Peacock. The documentary provided insight into Girls Gone Wild's influence and sex abuse allegation against the franchise and its founder. Koul's 2022 interview with Francis, who was revealed to now be living outside of the United States in Mexico since 2015 following a criminal conviction for imprisoning three women at his Hollywood home and assaulting one of them, was included in the series as well. In Koul's documentary series, multiple people, including a former Girls Gone Wild cameraman, alleged that Francis engaged in sex with underage minors and that some of his sexual encounters, no matter the age, were nonconsensual.

== Personal life ==
Koul was born to Indian parents and raised in Calgary, Alberta. She was a member of the Girl Guides of Canada and participated in their youth programs. She currently lives in New York with her cat, Sylvia Plath. She was formerly married.

Koul is an Indian-Canadian of Kashmiri descent, and her writing on race and shadism draws from her own life. Of her ethnicity, she has stated although she is of Indian descent herself, her fairer skin has given her a privilege when she goes to India.
