= Girls Gone Wild: The Untold Story =

- Based on: Girls Gone Wild
- Directed by: Jamila Wignot
- Starring: Joe Francis
- Composer: Ian Hultquist
- Country of origin: United States
- Original language: English
- No. of episodes: 3

Production
- Executive producers: Mary Robertson; Richard Alan Reid; Karolina Waclawiak; Paul Ricci; Eli Holzman; Aaron Saidman
- Producer: Jessica Call
- Cinematography: Caleb Heller
- Running time: 52–58 minutes
- Production companies: Maxine Productions; BuzzFeed Studios

Original release
- Network: Peacock
- Release: December 3, 2024

Girls Gone Wild: The Untold Story is a 2024 documentary series which explores the making of Girls Gone Wild and its creator Joe Francis. The three episode documentary series, which was made by Scaachi Koul and began streaming on Peacock on December 3, 2024, also explores the influence of Girls Gone Wild, including its popular culture influence, as well as its controversies, including the numerous sex abuse allegations concerning both the company and Francis.

== Episodes ==
No.	Title	Directed by	Original release date
1	"A Man, a Beach, a Dream"	Jamila Wignot	December 3, 2024
2	"Catch Me If You Can"	Jamila Wignot	December 3, 2024
3	"Joe Goes Wild"	Jamila Wignot	December 3, 2024
