= Wayne Madsen (journalist) =

American journalist and conspiracy theorist

Wayne Madsen (born April 28, 1954) is an American journalist and conspiracy theorist who writes the blog Wayne Madsen Report.

== Background and early life ==
Madsen was born on April 28, 1954, in Ridley Park, Pennsylvania, to an American mother and a Danish mariner. His grandmother, who emigrated to the U.S. with his father after World War II, was Victoria Madsen, a Danish communist party official. In the 1950s, Victoria was deported from the United States. Madsen attended the University of Mississippi, where he joined the Naval Reserve Officer Training Corps.

== Career ==
=== U.S. Navy ===
Upon graduation from University of Mississippi, he joined the U.S. Navy. He was commissioned an ensign.

In early 1982 he was stationed at the classified Naval Sound Surveillance System (SOSUS) station at Coos Head, which had an allowance of twelve officers, ninety-five enlisted and 15 civilians. He was later given a bad fitness report by his executive officer, Lt. Cmdr. Marney Finch who transferred him to Washington, D.C., later that year.

In 1984, Madsen reports that he was loaned to the National Security Agency by the Navy. He resigned from the Navy in 1985 as a lieutenant, having been passed over for promotion.

=== Post-Navy ===
Between 1985 and 1989 Madsen held a series of jobs, first working for RCA as a government consultant on contracts for the National Security Agency (NSA). Later he worked for the Navy's Naval Data Automation Command as a civilian employee. After this Madsen briefly established his own consulting firm, then worked for the National Bureau of Standards, and later for the State Department. In 1990 Madsen joined Computer Sciences Corporation, working there from 1990 until 1997, when he joined the Electronic Privacy Information Center (EPIC) as a senior fellow. In 1998, while at EPIC, Madsen was described by journalist Jason Vest in The Village Voice as one of the world's leading SIGINT and computer security experts. In late-January 2005, Madsen left EPIC. While at EPIC he appeared as a guest on 60 Minutes, ABC Nightline, Voice of America, and National Public Radio.

=== Blogging and other writing ===
He has been described as an "odd individual" devoted to writing in an area that "teeters on a slippery slope, at the foot of which is the whole repository of Internet-perpetuated conspiracy theories" which leads to much of his writing being treated with skepticism. He produces a blog called the Wayne Madsen Report. His articles have appeared in publications such as CorpWatch, CounterPunch, CovertAction Quarterly, In These Times, Multinational Monitor, The American Conservative, The Progressive and The Village Voice. His columns have appeared in the Atlanta Journal-Constitution, Columbus Dispatch, Houston Chronicle, Philadelphia Inquirer, Miami Herald and the Sacramento Bee.He appeared on WETA-TVs "White House Chronicle" in January 2012. He was a frequent contributor to The Alex Jones Show, but had fallen out with Jones by 2013. He has appeared as a guest on Al Jazeera.

== Opinions and assertions ==
=== Claims involving Israel and Mossad ===
Madsen has asserted in The Palestine Telegraph that hundreds of Iraqi scientists who had been assassinated or died in accidents after the invasion in 2003 were actually murdered by Mossad hit teams operating in Iraq.

In September 2005 he said that the lobby group, the American Israel Public Affairs Committee (AIPAC), had pressured American politicians to avoid protests against the Iraq War. In October 2005, he wrote that "an unidentified former CIA agent" claimed that the USS Cole was hit by a Popeye cruise missile launched from an Israeli Dolphin-class submarine.

In a 2008 article published by the Saudi Arab News cited Madsen's claim Mossad ran the Emperors Club as a front (in which former New York State governor Eliot Spitzer was entrapped). Further Madsen suggested that Spitzer was outed by Russian-Israeli gangsters angry at Spitzer's crack down on Wall Street malfeasance.

In 2009, Madsen claimed that Kurdish Jews were emigrating to Nineveh to take northern Iraq as a part of Greater Israel. He accused them of forging false flag Islamist attacks against local Christian Assyrians in order to expel them.

In 2010, he asserted in the Pakistan Daily that unnamed sources suggested that the company formerly known as Blackwater, had been conducting false-flag operations in Pakistan that were blamed on the Tehrik-i-Taliban Pakistan.

=== Claims about Barack Obama ===
Madsen has claimed that Obama is gay. The Nation writing on that conspiracy theory reported that Wayne Madsen "is the source on Obama's visits to the bath house and who revealed how Obama used basketball pickup games to pick up men. Obama, Madsen says, had homosexual trysts with Representative Artur Davis, Massachusetts Governor Deval Patrick and Senate majority leader Bill Frist.

On June 9, 2008, Madsen wrote that unnamed "GOP dirty tricks operatives" had found a Kenyan birth certificate registering the birth of Barack Obama, Jr. on August 4, 1961. "However, the registration is a common practice in African countries whose citizens abroad have families with foreign nationals." He claimed in August 2009 that Israeli prime minister Benjamin Netanyahu was responsible for creating the Obama "birther" movement in a broadcast on the RT (formerly known as Russia Today) network.

=== Observer story ===
On June 30, 2013, the London Observer published a front page story sourced to Madsen. According to Michael Moynihan of The Daily Beast, shortly after going to press, The Observer "realized that the story's author, Jamie Doward, failed to conduct even the most perfunctory Google search on Madsen. That would have revealed him to be a paranoid conspiracy theorist in the tradition of Alex Jones, on whose radio show he often appears". The article was quickly removed from the parent (The Guardian) newspaper's website pending an investigation, but not before the print edition had gone to press. According to Forbes magazine, The Observer likely took the story down as it was concerned with the reliability of the source rather than the content as no matter how "left field" the source was, the story seems to be largely true and has been a matter of public record for some years.

The story was allegedly sourced from a blog in which Madsen had been interviewed regarding his views on claims by NSA leaker Edward Snowden, alleging connections between the National Security Agency and several European governments known as ECHELON.

Joshua Gillin of the Poynter Institute said that The Observer had not interviewed Madsen but had taken the quotes from an online interview with Madsen and that Madsen's "declassified documents", upon which the story was based, were publicly available on the NSA website. However, Gillin later spoke to Madsen who stated that he was interviewed for The Observer article. According to Forbes, on June 30, 2013, the same day that The Observer both published and retracted the article, Reuters reported the same claims, but sourced from NSA documentation supplied by Edward Snowden to support his claims regarding the cyber-espionage programs Tempora and Prism.

On July 5, 2013 The Guardian responded to the controversy saying that "The documentary evidence for the story, which was based on a number of sources, was sound, but it was wrong to connect Wayne Madsen with the story. For this reason, the original story was removed from the website, and The Observer splash was replaced."

=== U.S. foreign policy claims ===
In 2002 he suggested to The Guardian newspaper that the United States Navy had aided in an attempted overthrow of Venezuelan president, Hugo Chávez. Madsen stated that US military attaches had been in contact with members of the Venezuelan military to discuss the possibility of a coup. Further, Madsen said that while the [U.S.] navy was in the area for training operations unconnected to the coup, they had aided with signals intelligence as the coup progressed and engaged in communications jamming support for the Venezuelan military. Madsen asserted that the US Navy jammed communications to and from the diplomatic missions of Libya, Cuba, Iran and Iraq. According to the Guardian, "The US embassy dismissed the allegations as 'ridiculous'." An OIG report requested by Sen. Christopher Dodd, found no wrongdoing by any U.S. officials either in the State Department or at the U.S. Embassy in Caracas.

On May 17, 2005, Madsen announced that America was secretly running the civil war in the Democratic Republic of the Congo (DRC) before a Subcommittee on International Operations and Human Rights hearing on the situation in the DRC. According to the news magazine New African, Madsens testimony "was so revealing that the mainstream Western media...have refused to print it."

On April 25, 2009, Madsen said that unidentified journalists from Mexico and Indonesia had spoken to some unidentified UN World Health Organization officials and scientists believed the 2009 new H1N1 strain of swine flu virus appeared to be the product of U.S. military sponsored gene splicing, as opposed to natural processes. While it can not be ruled out that the virus was created in a research laboratory or vaccine factory, the most plausible explanation is that the virus is the result of modern farming techniques. New Scientist magazine cited the example of a H1N2 influenza pandemic in the 1990s that was a reassortment (mix) of swine, human and avian strains.

== Bibliography ==
- The Manufacturing of a President: The CIA's Insertion of Barack H. Obama, Jr. into the White House. (Lulu 2012) ISBN 9781300011385
- Jaded Tasks – Brass Plates, Black Ops & Big Oil: The Blood Politics of Bush & Co. (TrineDay, 2006) ISBN 0-9752906-9-X
- Madsen, Wayne; Stanton, John (2003). America's Nightmare: The Presidency of George Bush II. Tempe, AZ: Dandelion Enterprises. p. 173. ISBN 978-1-893302-29-7. OCLC 55941597.
- Forbidden Truth: U.S.-Taliban Secret Oil Diplomacy, Saudi Arabia and the Failed Search for bin Laden co-authored with Jean-Charles Brisard and Guillaume Dasquie (Nation Books, 2002) ISBN 1-56025-414-9
- Genocide and Covert Operations in Africa 1993–1999 (African Studies) (Edwin Mellen Press, 1999) ISBN 0-7734-8002-1
- Handbook of Personal Data Protection (New York: Macmillan Publishers Ltd, 1992) (reference book on international data protection law) ISBN 1-56159-046-0
- ISIS IS US: The Shocking Truth: Behind the Army of Terror co-authored with John-Paul Leonard, Published by Progressive Press San Diego California 2016 ISBN 978-1-61577-151-6
- The Almost Classified Guide to CIA Front Companies, Proprietaries & Contractors (Lulu 2017) ISBN 978-1365111969
- The Star and the Sword(Lulu 2014) ISBN 978-1312459328
- Trump's Bananas Republic (Lulu 2018) ISBN 978-0359077830
- National Security Agency Surveillance: Reflections and Revelations, 2001-2013 (CreateSpace 2013) ISBN 978-1491211014
- Soros: Quantum of Chaos (Lulu 2015) ISBN 978-1329706712
- L'Affaire Petraeus (Lulu 2016) ISBN 978-1300483830
- The Betrayal of the Scorpion and Poet (Lulu 2014) ISBN 978-1312169005
- Cafe Vaterland Independently published 2019 ISBN 978-1696432474
- The Christian Mafia: The Rise of the Dominionist Movement and How It Threatens America?s Democracy (CreateSpace 2015) ISBN 978-1511885294
