= Casa Aramara =

Private estate in Punta Mita, Mexico

- Interactive map of the Casa Aramara area

General information
- Coordinates: 20°46′3″N 105°29′54″W
- Owner: Joe Francis

Technical details
- Floor count: 2

Design and construction
- Architect: Martyn-Lawrence Bullard

Other information
- Number of rooms: 12

Website
- http://www.casaaramara.com/

Casa Aramara is a private, seaside estate in Punta Mita, Mexico owned and presently occupied by American softcore pornography entrepreneur Joe Francis.

The villa is part of a 1,500-acre beachfront village on the north end of Banderas Bay in the Mexican state of Nayarit, about 10 miles (16 km) north of Puerto Vallarta, Jalisco.

== History, occupants and media appearances ==
The estate was named after Aramara, the Huichol goddess of life to the natives whose land the resort now occupies. The 40,000-square-foot property was commissioned by Joe Francis and designed by architects Martyn-Lawrence Bullard. The villa was featured on Bravo's hit television show, Million Dollar Decorators, and appears in E!'s franchise, Keeping Up with the Kardashians.

The estate has been rented by Jennifer Aniston, Eva Longoria, Demi Moore, and the Kardashian family. In 2013, Kourtney Kardashian and boyfriend Scott Disick took their children to Casa Aramara. In December 2012, Extra and The X Factor host Mario Lopez used the property to wed Courtney Mazza, filmed by the cable network TLC as Mario and Courtney's Wedding Fiesta.

Kourtney Kardashian returned to the villa in April 2014 with her partner, Scott Disick, and their children, Mason and Penelope Disick to celebrate her 35th birthday. Kim Kardashian and Kanye West celebrated their honeymoon in June 2014 in Casa Aramara.

Since his 2015 criminal convictions, flight from the United States and continuing sex abuse allegations, Francis has lived at Casa Aramara full time while attempting to avoid extradition from Mexico.
