= Islas Marietas National Park =

Group of small uninhabited islands in Mexico

Coordinates: 20.699°N 105.585°W

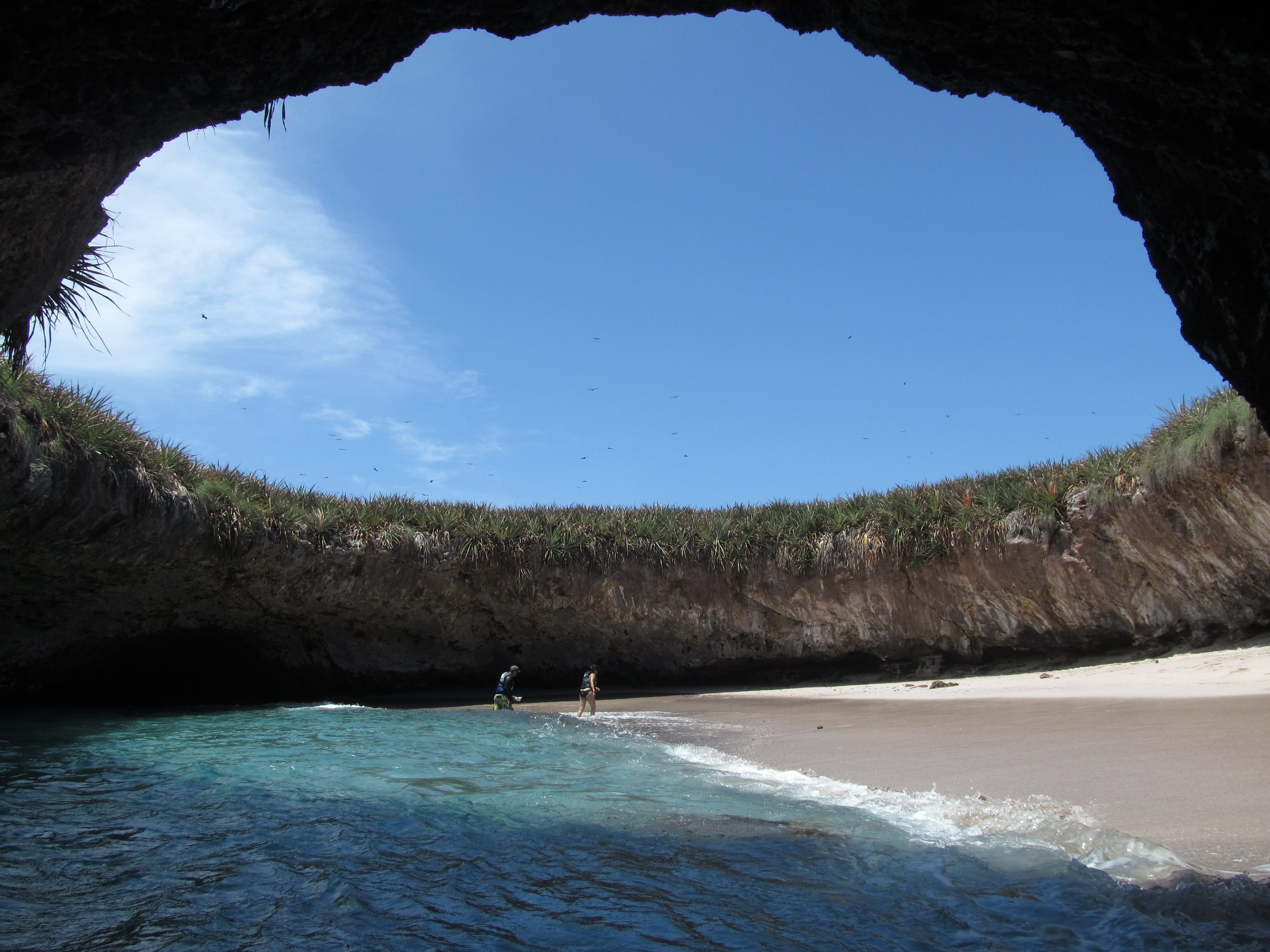
- The "love beach" (Playa del Amor), also called the "hidden beach" (Playa Escondida) in the islands. The beach is a popular tourist destination.

- Location within Mexico

Ramsar Wetland
- Official name: Islas Marietas
- Designated: 2 February 2004
- Reference no.: 1345

The Marieta Islands (Spanish: Islas Marietas) are a group of small uninhabited islands a few miles off the coast of the state of Nayarit, Mexico, located in federal waters approximately 7.9 kilometres (4.9 mi) southwest of the peninsula known as Punta de Mita, in the municipality of Bahía de Banderas.

The islands are a popular tourist destination because of the abundant marine life populations due to the islands being protected from fishing and hunting by the Mexican government. The ocean water depth around the islands is between 70 and 110 feet.

== Geography ==
The Marietas Islands were originally formed many thousands of years ago by volcanic activity, and are completely uninhabited. The islands are about an hour-long boat ride west-northwest from the coast of Puerto Vallarta or a 15-minute boat ride from the resort area of Punta Mita and are visited daily by hundreds of tourists. However, visitors cannot legally set foot on the islands.

In the early 1900s, the Mexican government began conducting military testing on the islands since they were uninhabited. Many bombings and large explosions took place on the islands causing caves and rock formations to be created. After a massive international outcry, started by scientist Jacques Cousteau in the late 1960s, the government eventually decided to declare the islands a national park and therefore protected against any fishing, hunting or human activity.

Situated in a sort of open sun-drenched crater, the beach pictured is nicknamed the "hidden beach" or "beach of love" (Playa del Amor), and is accessible only when the tide is low. This topographical anomaly was created by bombs in the 1900s and the erosion afterwards.

== Flora and fauna ==
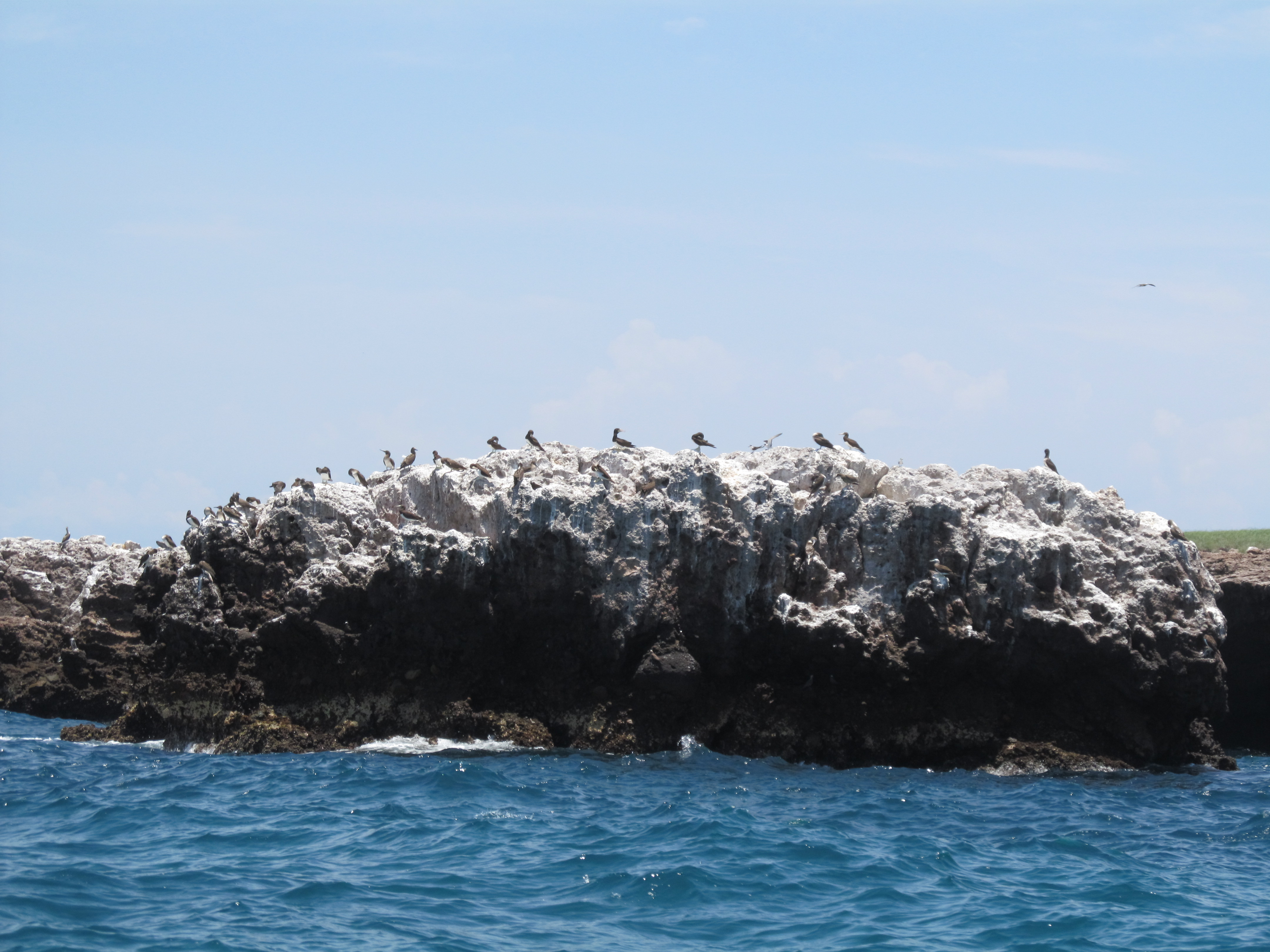
Many species of birds make the islands their breeding and feeding ground

The islands are home to 44 species of plants and wildlife. This has led to the inclusion of the national park as a Ramsar site and it was designated as a UNESCO Man and the Biosphere Reserve. Many species of seabirds use the location as feeding and breeding grounds, these include blue-footed boobies as well as the red-billed tropicbirds. It also has many different varieties of coral, which, in turn, is home to a large variety of reef fish species. The island ecosystem is also home to dolphins, manta rays and a number of tropical fish. Eels and many species of sea turtles are also found in the reefs and the many caves that dot the site. During the winter months humpback whales arrive at the islands and can be observed all through winter.

== Tourism ==
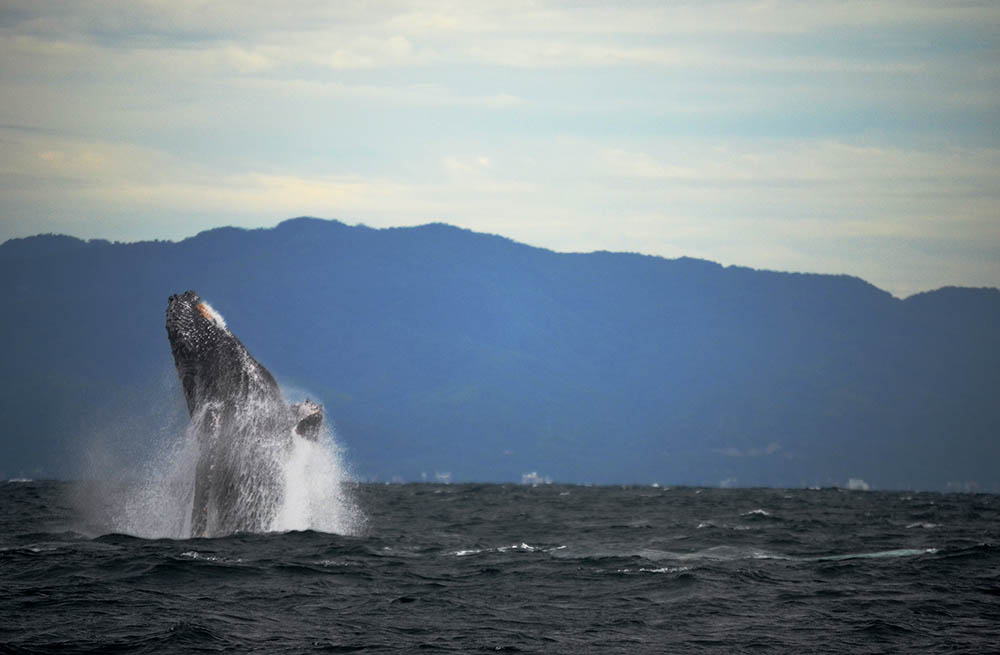
Humpback whale breaching off the islands

Protection by the government has created an environment conducive to the development of the marine ecosystem, and is a popular location for snorkeling and scuba diving. Now even during whale watching tours, people often report seeing sea turtles, manta rays, octopus, wild dolphins, humpback whales and thousands of species of tropical fish around the islands. The islands are also home to a few thousand birds, with species such as the blue-footed booby. Currently, the Mexican government allows only a few companies to go to the islands and allows the landing of passengers onto one secluded beach with the necessary permit from SEMARNAT.

From Punta de Mita, small boats do tours through the islands to see the wildlife of this region. From December to March gray and humpback whales can be observed that come from Alaska to give birth off the coast of Nayarit.

It has been estimated in studies carried out at the University of Guadalajara that the so-called "hidden beach" or the "love beach" can accommodate up to 116 visitors a day without degrading. The carrying capacity of the entire park is 625 visitors a day. (These studies used the antiquated system of tourism carrying capacity to estimate visitors). However the actual number of visitors is typically three or four times this limit with more than 2500 visitors landing on it each day during 2016. During the Easter holidays more than 250 boats landed on the island per day, some of them carrying as many as 400 tourists. This has been due to recent interest in the island. The number of tourists in 2012 was only 27,500, but this skyrocketed to 127,372 in 2015.

== Closure to general public ==
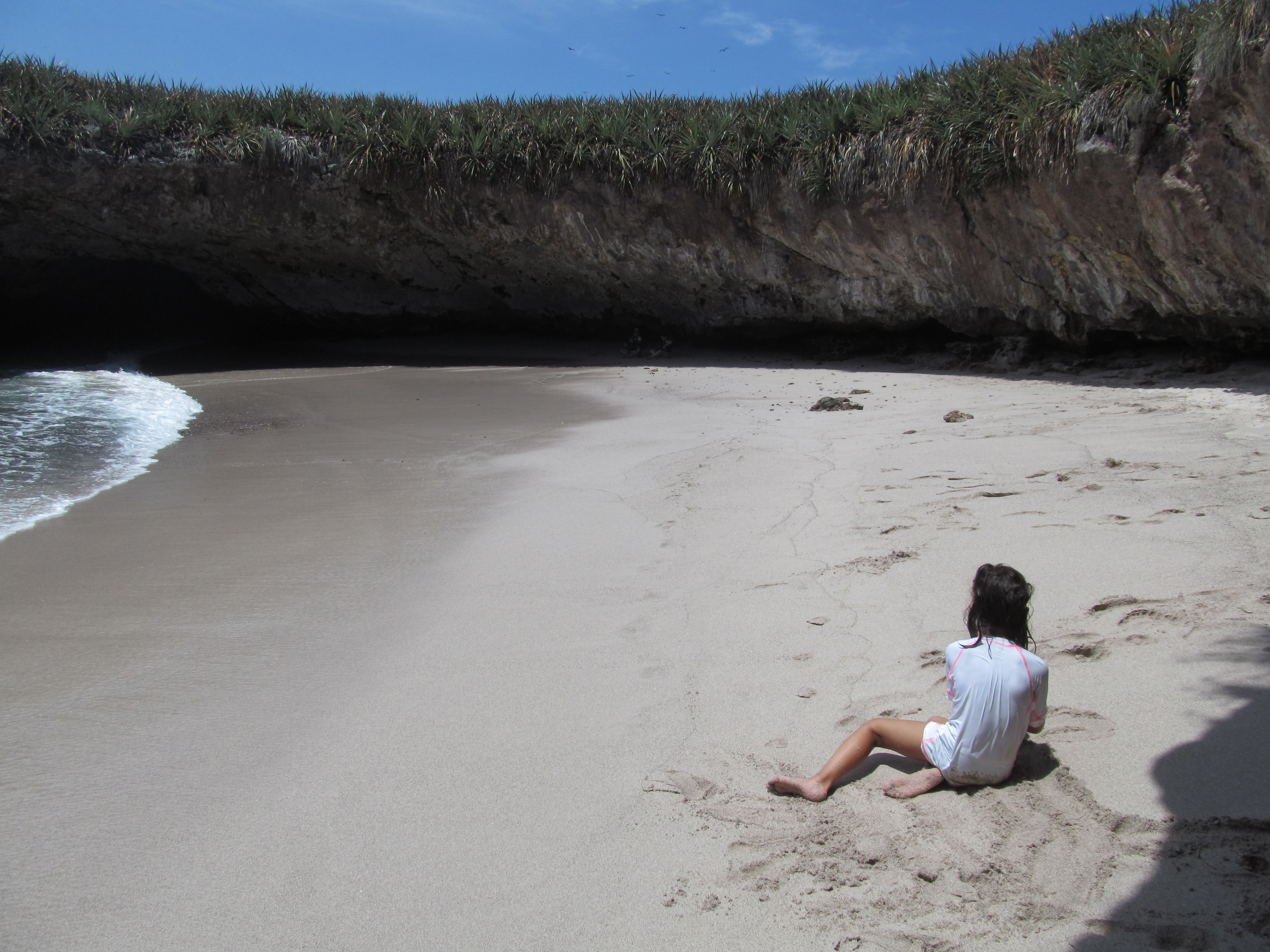
The pristine beaches of the islands were a popular tourist destination

In May 2016, the National Commission of Protected Natural Areas, the national environmental authority in Mexico announced that the islands and their beaches shall be closed to the general public from May 9.

There have been several reasons presented for this closure, although all of them stem from the increased number of tourists visiting the site. One of the main reasons of the closure is that the coral in the area is being destroyed. The cause of coral destruction is thought to be a combination of global warming, presence of boat oil in the water due to excessive tour trips and physical destruction due to dropping of anchors up to 250 times a day.

The structure of the islands and the famous beach is composed of two types of volcanic rocks. The interior is made up of "explosive rocks" which erode quickly and the exterior "shell" is made up of a more resilient form of rock which can withstand erosion to a greater degree. This does not mean that the island is not susceptible to erosion. According to various studies carried out in 2014 it has been estimated that the island only has a few thousand more years before it will erode away. However, the rate of erosion is being accelerated by human impact and according to officials, "Excessive tourism could lead to a more rapid destruction of this sanctuary."

Another problem is the increase in solid waste pollution and hydrocarbon pollution. These pose a threat not only to the coral but to larger animals as well. even the humpback whales have felt the negative impact of hydrocarbon pollution.

When the closure was announced, rumors began to circulate on various social media networks that the islands and the beaches had been sold to foreign corporations. Roberto Sandoval, the governor of Nayarit, dismissed these rumors as fabrications and stated that the islands were part of the Mexican national heritage and shall therefore remain an icon of Riviera Nayarit forever.

== Conservation efforts ==
The Mexican authorities have outlined several plans to undo the damage done to the beaches and the islands. These will focus not only repairing the damage already caused by human hands, but will also focus on mitigating any further human interference in the ecosystem. The first part of the plan is to "replant" the coral in order to compensate for the coral that has been destroyed. This is done by attaching new coral to the already existing coral and letting it grow for 3 to 4 months. Another major effort focuses on limiting the damaging human impact on the sanctuary when the islands reopen for the general public and tourists. According to National Commission of Natural Protected Areas (CONANP) after the islands have been reopened for tourism tourist overload may be mitigated by placing a special floating dock in the bay area which will limit the ships that arrive. another measure under consideration is to place buoys around the fragile ecosystem in order to control the number of visitors that are arriving.

The Marieta Islands National Park in Mexico

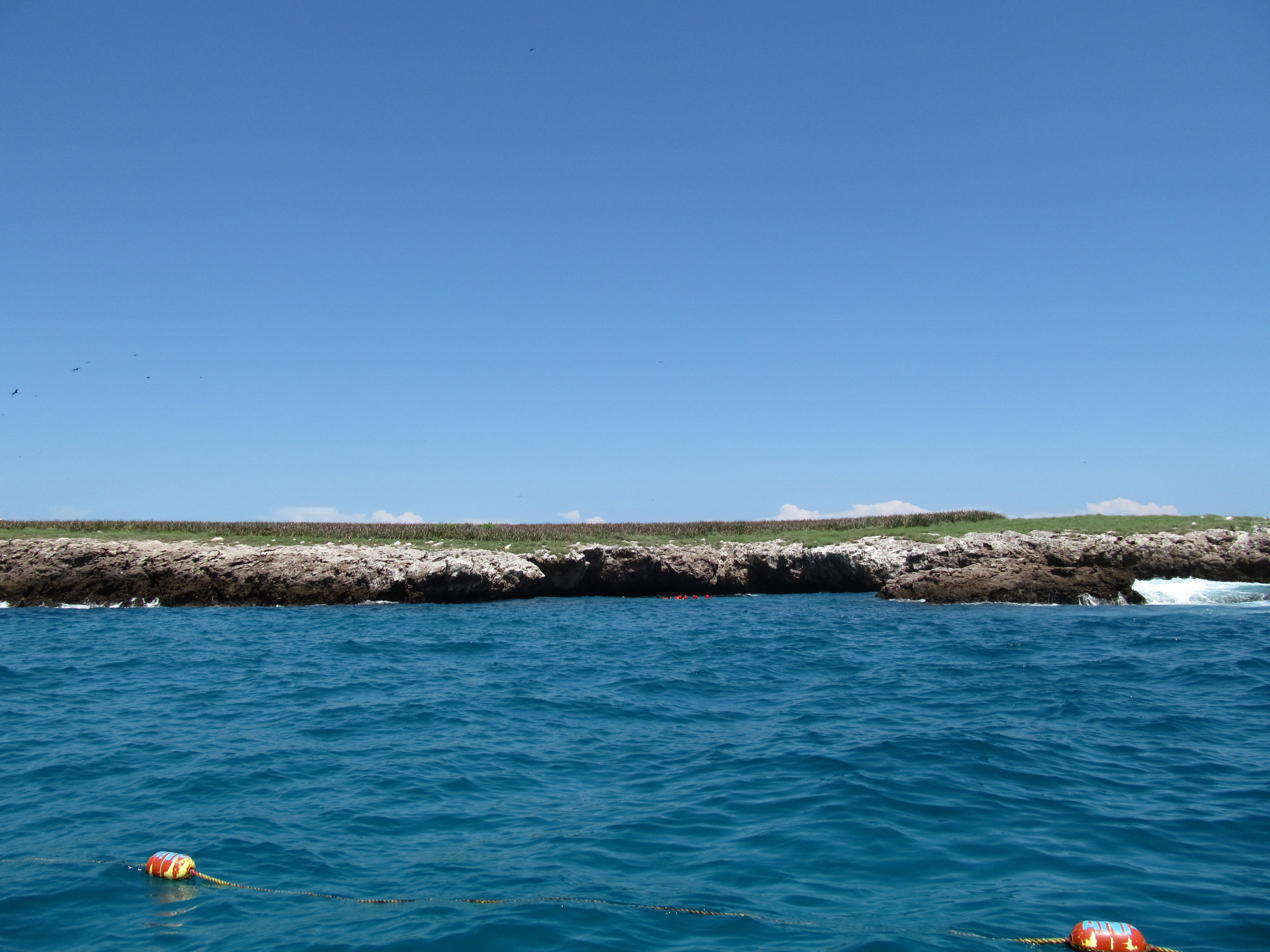

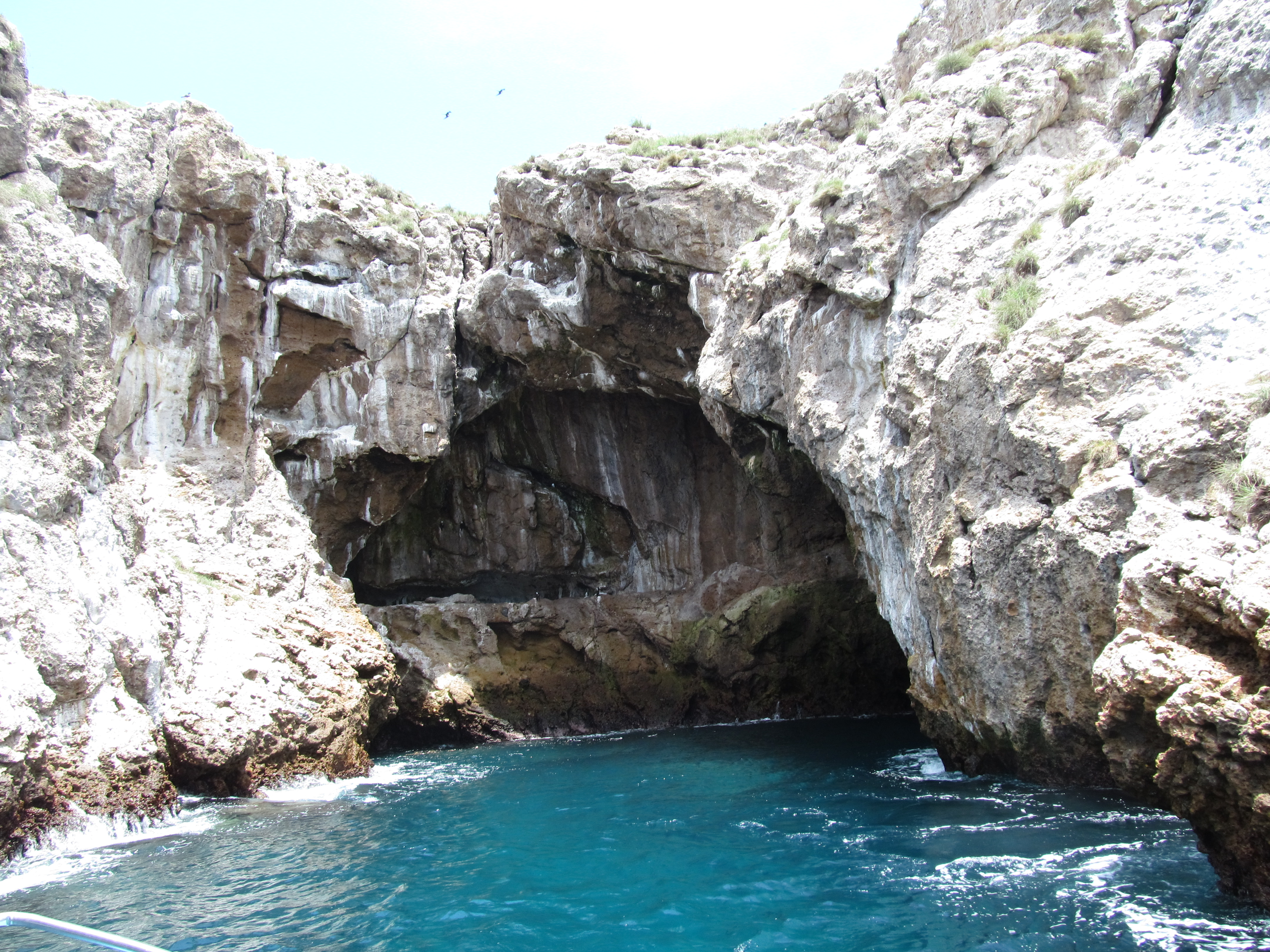

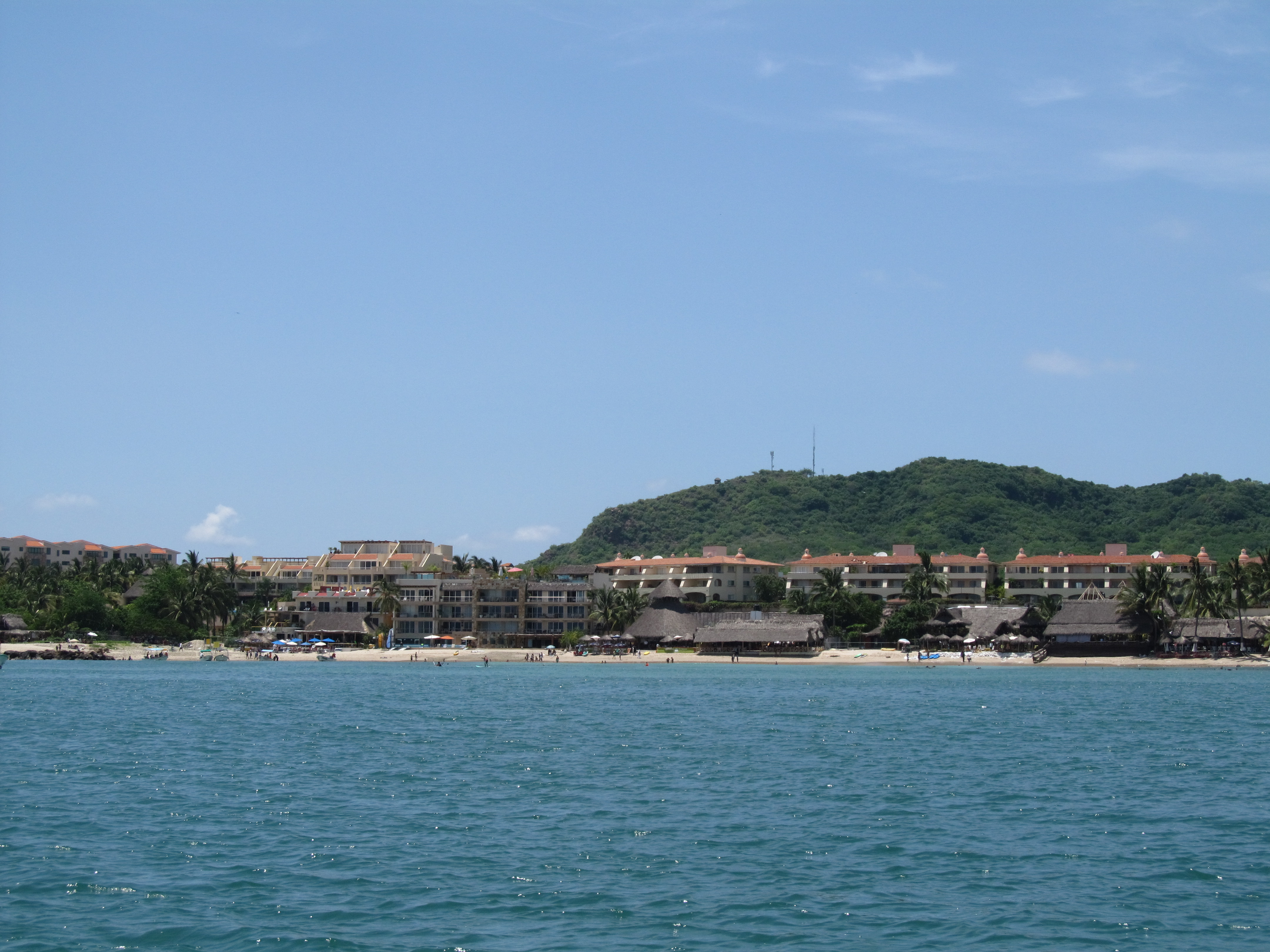

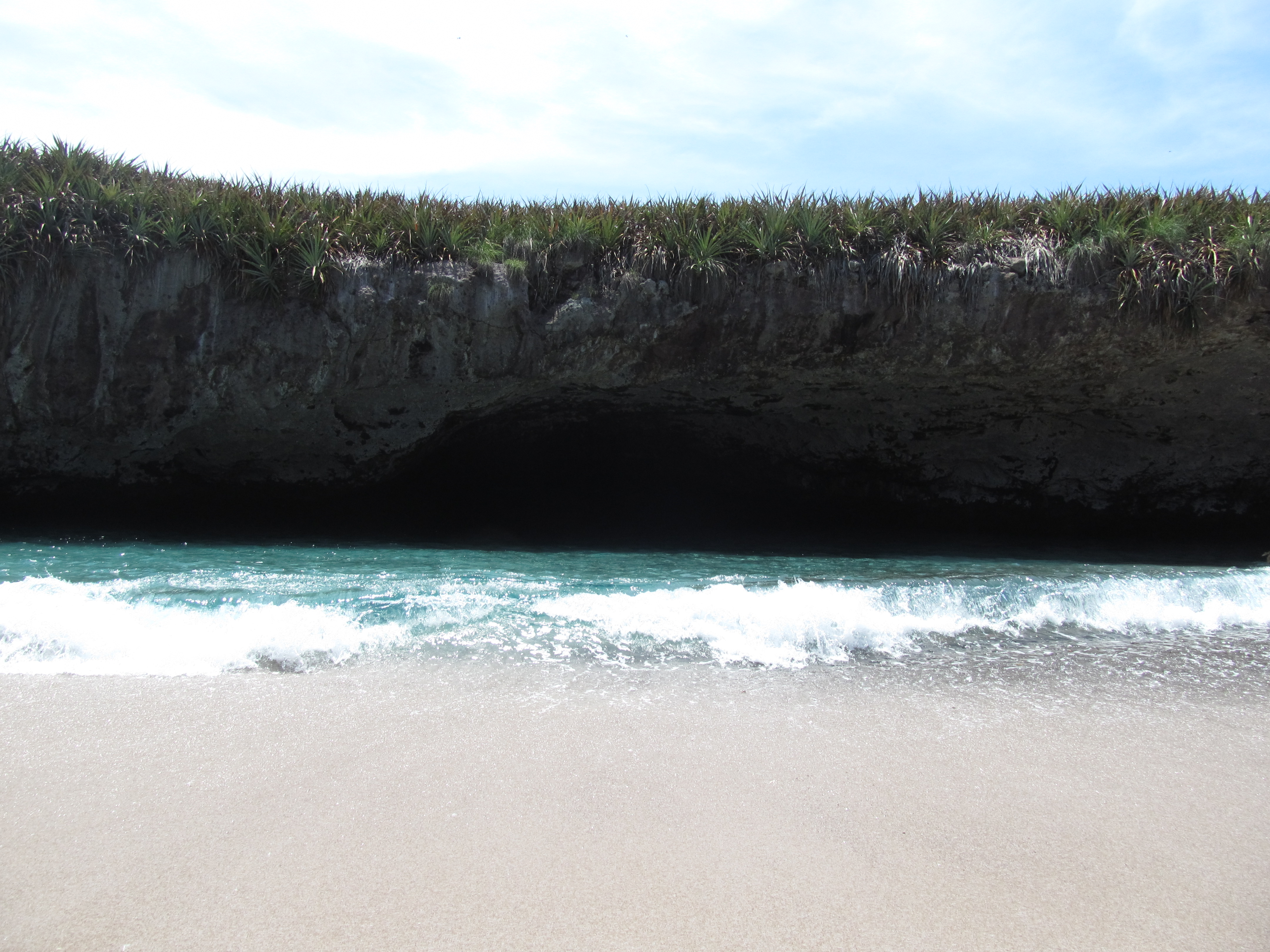

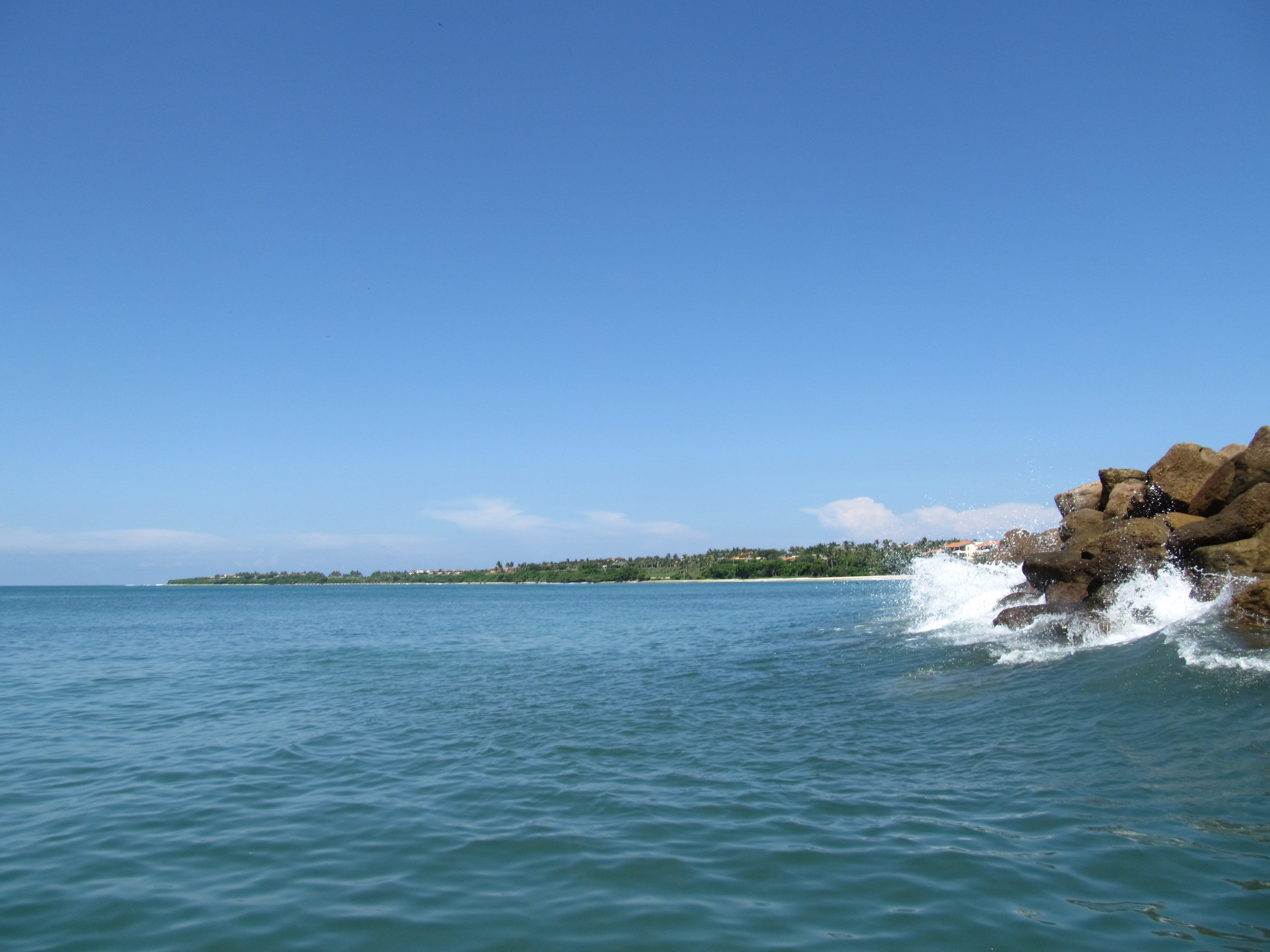

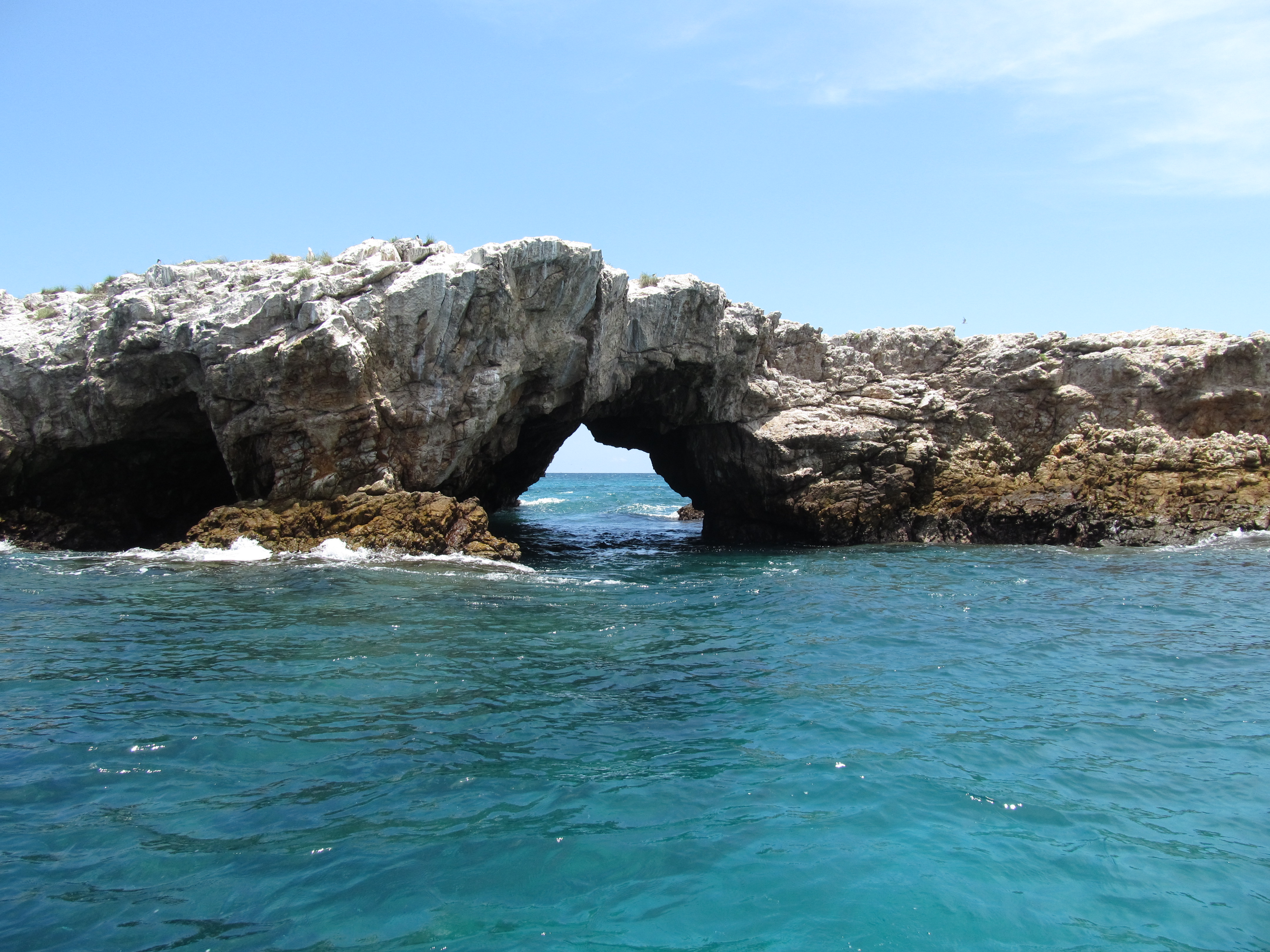

== See also ==
- Islas Marías
