= Royal Jomtien Resort Hotel fire =

1997 fire at a hotel in eastern Thailand

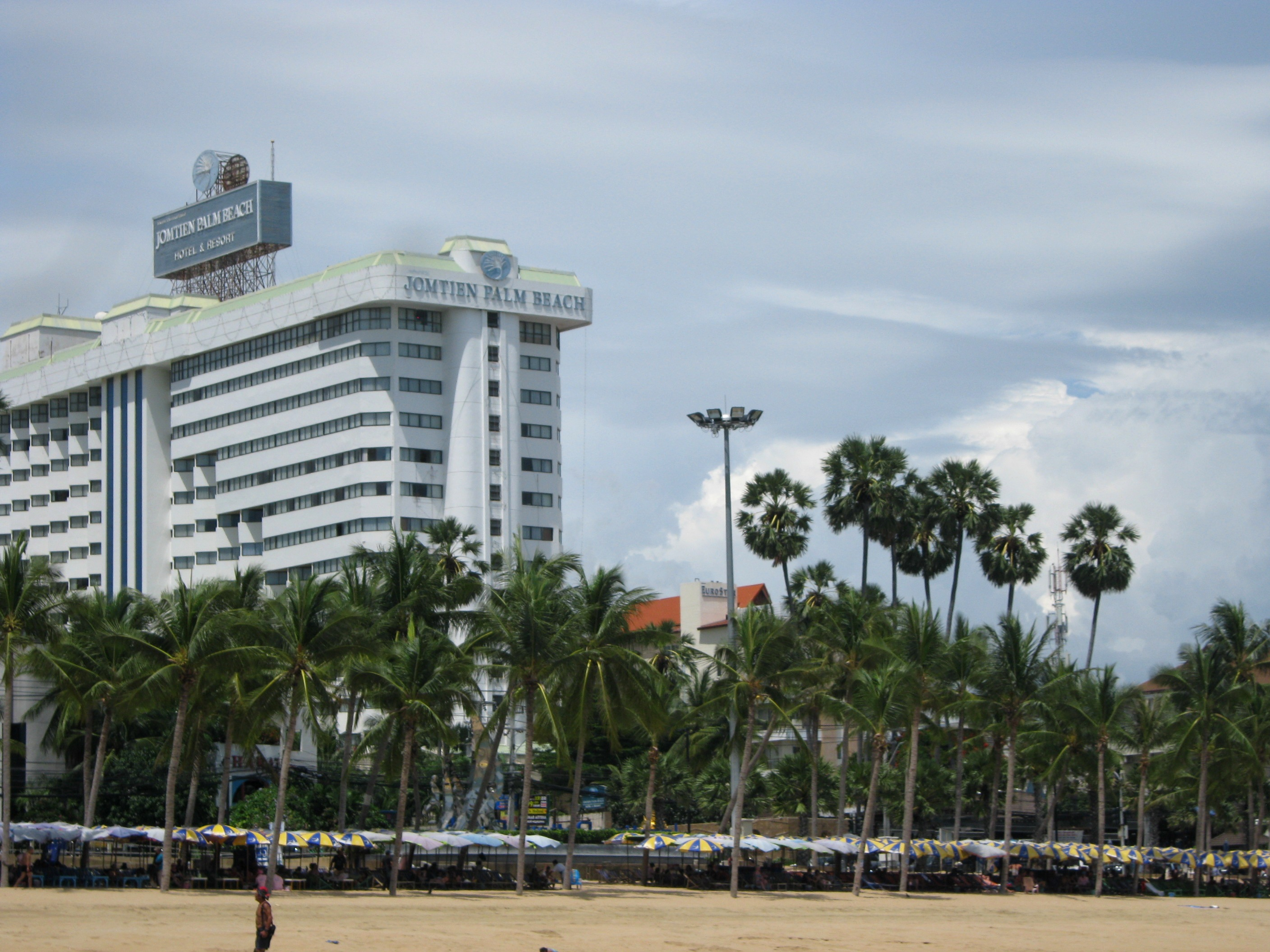
- Jomtien Palm Beach Hotel and Resort, former Royal Jomtien Hotel; site of fire
- Date: 11 July 1997
- Time: 10:20 a.m.
- Location: Jomtien Beach, Chon Buri, Thailand; 12°53′54.0″N 100°52′06.9″E
- Cause: Ignition of a faulty liquid propane gas cylinder
- Deaths: 102 total — 91 in fire at Jomtien — 11 volunteers in traffic accident at Chachoengsao
- Injuries: 63+
- Property damage: US$ 40 million

The Royal Jomtien Resort Hotel was a 450-room luxury hotel situated in a 17-story high-rise building on the northern end of Jomtien Beach, 110 kilometres (68 mi) south of Bangkok. At approximately 10:20 local time (03:20 GMT), 11 July 1997, a fire ignited as a result of a faulty liquid propane gas cylinder in a ground floor buffet of the hotel. The fire burned for 8 to 12 hours across all floors and caused the deaths of at least 91 people and injuries to a further 63.

A National Fire Protection Association report attributed the ignition of the fire to human error by a worker who had identified faulty valve assembly on a gas cylinder in a ground-floor buffet; while attempting to shut off the valve, the worker inadvertently increased the flow of gas and caused an explosion. The combustible wood and vinyl furnishings of the establishment allowed the fire to develop rapidly, as did a lack of fire separation, compartmentation and active suppression systems. As acrid smoke overcame the entire complex, several victims reportedly jumped from the higher windows to their deaths.

At the time of the fire the building was 8 years old and had therefore been constructed prior to 1992 laws dictating mandatory installation of fire alarms and smoke detectors in Thai high-rise hotels. The fire prompted a review of safety standards of other high rise buildings in Chon Buri and at least 200 other buildings in the Pattaya area were found not to comply with the fire safety standards that had been violated by the Royal Jomtien Resort Hotel prior to the fire.

== Background ==
The Royal Jomtien Resort Hotel complex was constructed between 1988 and 1990 on a plot of land owned by Kiatphol Co. Ltd. in the Bang Lamung District of Chon Buri, Thailand. The location of the hotel complex directly across Soi Jomtiensaineung from Jomtien Beach meant it was susceptible to strong sea breezes blowing off the ocean, as was present on the day of the fire.

== Fire ==
The source of the fire is thought to have been a liquid propane gas cylinder of 9 kilograms (20 lb) in size that was attached to an oven or other cooking appliance in a coffee shop — variously identified as a buffet — on the ground floor of the then 4 star hotel.

Some time before 10:20 local time (03:20 GMT), employees of the ground-floor eatery noticed the smell of gas emanating from the kitchen. This initial release of gas was attributed to the actions of a kitchen helper — identified in the local media as Khayan Kasien — when he removed a hose from the cylinder without shutting off the valve.

According to a National Fire Protection Association report, a hotel worker — identified in the local media as Chamnien Suthho, the manager of the eatery — who had been investigating the smell attempted to shut off the valve on the cylinder and unwittingly increased the flow of vapor. The expanding vapor quickly ignited, causing a gas explosion that killed at least 8 workers in the kitchen. At the time of ignition there were up to 300 guests inside the hotel complex.

Flames from the explosion quickly overwhelmed guests waiting in the lobby for breakfast. The combustible wooden and vinyl furnishings of the complex, a strong westerly breeze, and a lack of active fire suppression systems — such as sprinklers — allowed the fire to spread rapidly through the 1st level of the complex, and the entire lobby area was alight within 20 minutes. The 2nd level, which housed conference rooms that had been hosting seminars for Serm-Sukh PCL (partners of PepsiCo in Thailand) and Thailand's electric authority (EGAT), was also fully alight within 30 minutes of ignition. Seminar attendees were heavily represented among the casualties of the fire, with at least 24 employees of EGAT identified among the dead.

A lack of pressurization in the stairwell, the absence of fire-stopping on service shafts, and few self-closers installed on upper level doors had allowed toxic smoke to penetrate the 3rd to 16th floors and asphyxiate many of the people residing there. A particularly large number of fatalities occurred on the 11th floor, including those of several children.

=== Emergency response ===
Inadequate fire training contributed to the initial spread of the fire; according to witnesses who spoke to The Nation, employees in the kitchen and coffee-house had failed to use one of the few chemical extinguishers appropriately and eventually left it to be consumed by the fire, causing a further explosion.

The official emergency response was delayed by connection issues and bureaucracy. According to the then guest relations manager of the hotel, she had attempted to call the Pattaya Fire Department and, after several issues, was only connected 15 minutes later. Witnesses who spoke to the Pattaya Times indicated the first emergency personnel had taken over 30 minutes to arrive, and the local firefighters that were in attendance lacked the appliances or equipment to reach people on the higher floors. Only two to four hours after ignition did appliances and equipment adequate for fighting fires in high-rise buildings arrive from Bangkok. The arrival of the Bangkok fire appliances was delayed in part by a traffic accident in Chachoengsao that killed 11 civilian volunteers who had also been traveling to the scene of the fire.

A trio of police helicopters that had flown in from Bangkok began retrieving victims stranded on the roof of the complex roughly 90 minutes into the emergency. An American tourist, Rochelle Stein Salmi, and her daughter were rescued from their 16th floor room by a helicopter and featured prominently in subsequent media reports of the fire.

Rescue efforts were hindered by fire exits that had been blocked with stored equipment and padlocked from the outside; in one instance rescuers were forced to remove a padlock off one gate, which they reached only after clearing a path through hundreds of stored chairs. Emergency workers were also forced to use sledgehammers to break through a high perimeter fence for access to patients who required extraction to hospital.

=== Casualties ===
Ninety-one guests died from burns, asphyxiation, thermal trauma or jumping out of higher level windows in an attempt to escape. The final fatality resulting from the fire was a 40-year-old woman who suffered serious burns and succumbed to a lung infection following a week long coma. Among the victims were six Hungarians, three South Koreans and one Belgian as well as dozens of Thai hotel employees, conference attendees and tourists.

The practice of locking emergency exit doors to prevent guests from leaving without paying their bills greatly increased the number of casualties. The locked emergency exits were observed by numerous witnesses, including a guest and employee of EGAT, who offered the following statement to Reuters.

We all ran for our lives to the fire exit so that we could take the stairway outside, but we found the door locked.

== Investigation ==
Thaworn Ujjin, managing director of the hotel, was charged on 16 July with causing death and injury by negligence and illegal modification of the building. Intra Thamrongvittavaspong, the president of Kiatphol Co. Ltd. and majority shareholder in the hotel, was charged with the same offences on 23 July.

== Aftermath ==
- The hotel since changed its name to Jomtien Palm Beach Hotel
