= Mantra Films =

- Company type: Private
- Industry: Pornography
- Founder: Joe Francis
- Headquarters: Santa Monica, California, United States
- Products: Pornographic films

Mantra Films Inc., or Mantra Entertainment, was an American independent softcore pornography production company created by Joe Francis, chiefly for the production and distribution of the United States–based Girls Gone Wild and Guys Gone Wild media franchises.

== History and organization ==
The company was previously known as Fall Line Entertainment. In addition to Girls Gone Wild, the company also produced the Banned from Television series in 1998, featuring raw, uncensored and graphic scenes of violence caught on camera. The company also produces "Uncensored" versions of reality dating shows such as Blind Date and The 5th Wheel, which feature extensive (mostly female) nudity and sexual content that cannot be shown on mainstream television.

The company is based on a business model of getting young women to bare their breasts on camera in exchange for a t-shirt, then selling the resulting videos directly to the consumer. In the early days of his company, Francis obtained this footage third-party, and some cameramen who sold Francis footage did not obtain releases from those being filmed. This resulted in lawsuits, one of which was settled for $10,000. Today the videos, which sell for as little as $9.99 apiece, contribute to a total sales figure of $40 million a year for Mantra Films, Inc.

== Legal issues ==
In January 2001, Francis was found liable by a Los Angeles jury for misappropriating the idea for Banned from Television, a series of extreme videotapes that preceded Girls Gone Wild and were distributed by Mantra. The jury awarded producer Les Haber a total of $3.5 million on his claims against Francis.

A 2003 complaint against Mantra Films, Inc. resulted in a $1.1 million payout by the company. The complaint stemmed from Mantra's practice of enrolling customers in continuity programs without their consent. The penalty was partially to redress the customers who were harmed and also a civil penalty.

On September 12, 2006, Francis entered a plea agreement in a Florida court for failing to properly document the ages of models depicted in certain episodes, and for failing to label the DVDs with information regarding where such records are kept, as required by federal law. Following prosecution by the Obscenity Prosecution Task Force and the United States District Court for the Northern District of Florida, Francis agreed to pay $2.1 million in fines. The law in question is designed to protect minors from sexual exploitation.

In 2009 Mantra Films was reported to be delinquent in paying over $651,000 to the California Franchise Tax Board.
