= Burnt Cedar Beach =

Lake Tahoe private recreation area

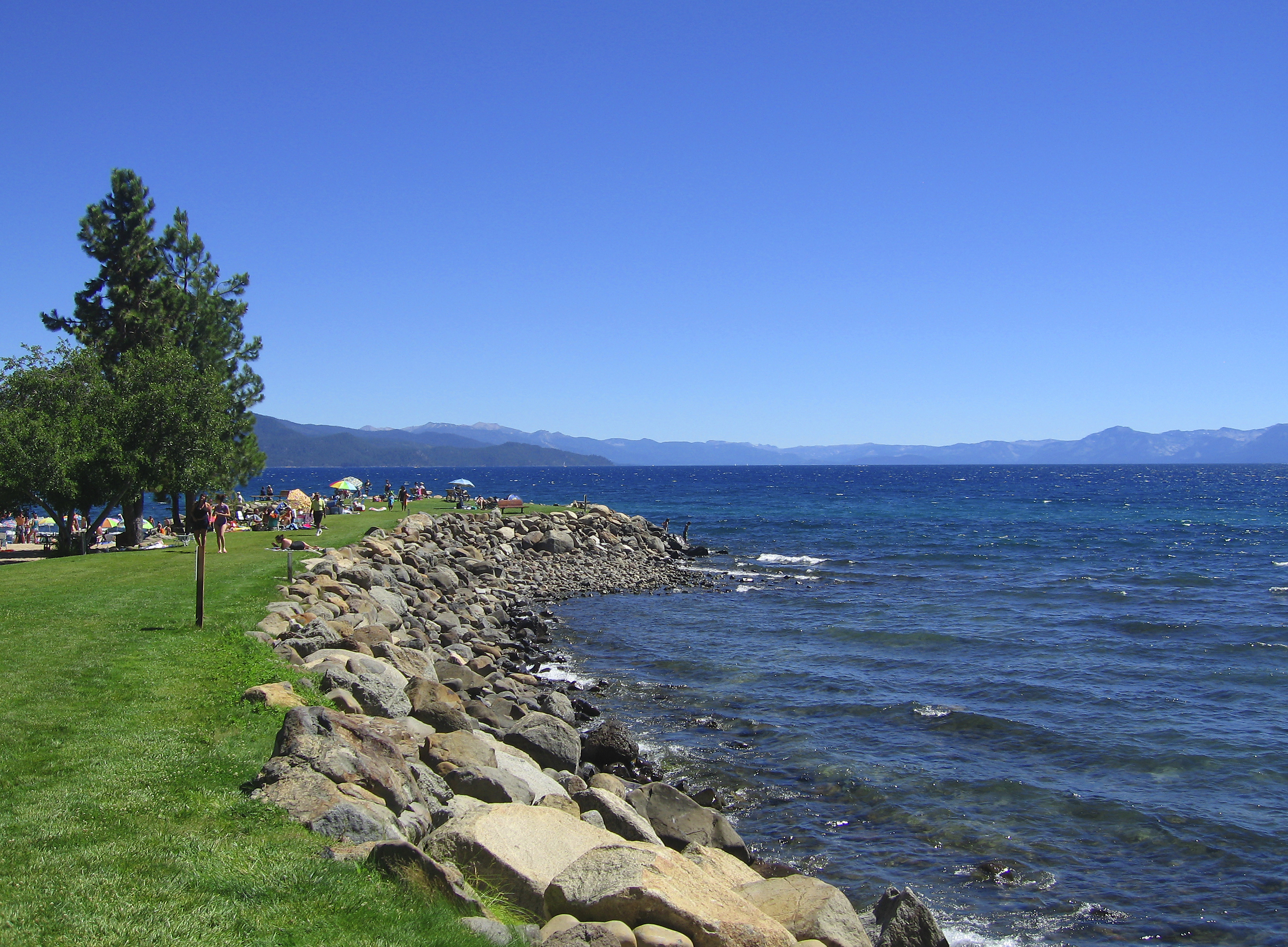
Breakwater point at Burnt Cedar Beach (2008)

Burnt Cedar Beach is a community-operated private beach located at 665 Lakeshore Drive in north Lake Tahoe, Nevada, in the United States, managed by the Incline Village General Improvement District. There are four beaches in the district: Burnt Cedar, Incline Beach, Ski Beach, and Sand Harbor Beach. Visitors must have an IVID access card to enter; access is limited to property owners within the 1968-era boundaries of the district, although the boundaries have since expanded. Amenities of the beach include a large heated swimming pool with a lifeguard and water slide, a toddler pool, a snack bar, a lawn and playground, picnic tables, and barbecues. The beach has approximately 1,300 ft (400 m) of shoreline, and a 200 ft (61 m) jetty.

== History ==
There was a trailer park at the site before the area was developed beginning in the 1960s. Developer Art Wood of Oklahoma bought the Incline land in 1960 from San Franciscan George Whittell for US$5,300,000 (equivalent to $57,679,978 in 2025). Wood and Harold Tiller created the Crystal Bay Development Company that developed and marketed the project.

The beach was named, circa 1961, after "a large fire-killed, moss-covered tree found on the property." There were "huge trees" left in place during the development; underbrush and rocks were moved, and beach sand was added. The pool was added in 1963. Parking for 200 automobiles and boat trailers, and green belt plantings between the road and the beach, and between the beach and neighboring properties, were installed at the same time.

A new pool house/bathroom building was constructed in 2000. As of 2011, Burnt Cedar Beach was known as the local "mommy beach," since it was usually packed with parents and small kids. In 2018, the Incline Village General Improvement District received a $81,000 federal grant to improve local water quality in the vicinity of Burnt Cedar Beach. The beach has ongoing issues with urban stormwater runoff and sedimentation. Burnt Cedar Creek Beach lies within the 579-acre (234 ha) Burnt Cedar Creek sub-watershed.

Residents with homes outside the 1968 perimeter have sued for access to the beach through both the federal courts and Nevada state courts, but the access limits were upheld in both cases.

== Tree attacks ==
The beach has been the site of a series of tree poisonings in 2022, 2023, 2024, and 2026. Someone has drilled holes in the trees and poured something that smells like diesel in the tree wells of mature Jeffrey pines and Douglas firs. In addition to the diesel-smelling liquid, a "separate unknown substance was found in the holes" in the trunks of the trees. According to a press release from the Washoe County Sheriff's Department, "Soil samples have been collected and submitted for testing to help determine what substance was used and whether the same substance was involved in each incident. Investigators have also confirmed that holes were not drilled near the roots in every case."

Twenty-eight trees have been attacked in total. Six trees died as a result of the 2022 attacks. Five of six trees attacked in 2024 died. The trees attacked in 2022 and 2023 were all located "near the parking lot closest to the park and restrooms." There have been three distinct incidents in 2026. Workers have removed contaminated soil and attempted to dilute the substance through heavy watering. The shade provided by the trees is considered one of the amenities of the beach. The beach has no security cameras. Investigators suspect the poisoner(s) work at night. According to one account the "estimated losses" are $300,000.
