= Katinka Blackford Newman =

British journalist and film maker

Katinka Blackford Newman is a British journalist, documentary filmmaker and the author of The Pill That Steals Lives: One Woman's Terrifying Journey to Discover the Truth about Antidepressants. She is primarily known for her work investigating the adverse effects of psychiatric medication and for challenging the diagnosis of normal human emotions as illnesses that need to be medicated.

== Career ==
=== Documentaries ===
Blackford Newman began her career directing episodes of Banged Up Abroad, Body Shock (Half Ton Man), Murder in the Family, and Channel 4's Surrendered Wives, based on the book Surrendered Wife by Laura Doyle.

=== Writing and journalism ===
In 2012, Blackford Newman was prescribed the antidepressants mirtazapine and escitalopram for insomnia and stress. Shortly after starting the medication, she experienced psychosis and hallucinations. She was hospitalised and placed on multiple psychiatric medications. When she reported feeling an acute inability to stop moving, and the medical staff failed to recognise that the medication had triggered a side effect known as akathisia. She moved to St Charles' Hospital in the NHS when her private health insurance ran out. St Charles' sectioned her and discontinued her medication. Her withdrawals lasted for three weeks, but she reported making a full recovery.

Blackford Newman asserted that her initial psychosis was a result of an extreme adverse reaction and that her subsequent year long illness was caused by side effects of the drugs she was being forced to take.

She subsequently began researching the potential links between antidepressants, psychosis, suicide, and violence. In 2016, she published a book titled The Pill That Steals Lives, in which she documented her experience and the experiences of others who reported similar reactions. She has also contributed to media coverage of the topic, including the BBC Panorama documentary A Prescription for Murder?, which explored the case of James Holmes.

Blackford Newman has worked with other individuals who attribute acts of violence to adverse drug reactions, including David Carmichael and David Crespi, both of whom committed filicide while taking antidepressants. She has also provided expert commentary in court cases where psychiatric medication has been raised as a factor. Additionally, she co-founded the non-profit, antidepressantrisks.org.

Blackford Newman continues to campaign for increased awareness of potential side effects associated with psychiatric medication and advocates for closer scrutiny of prescription practices.

== Publications ==
=== The Pill That Steals Lives ===
The Pill That Steals Lives recounts Blackford Newman's experience of extreme distress, a diagnosis of psychotic depression, and treatment with multiple psychotropic medicines. She describes severe adverse effects that she states resolved after discontinuation. The narrative follows her decision, as a documentary filmmaker, to investigate antidepressants and their risks. It raises questions about explanations of chemical imbalances, pharmaceutical practices, and the widening of indications for prescription. The book combines personal testimony with investigative material and includes her children in the account. It highlights akathisia as a serious reaction linked to agitation, violence, and suicidal thinking. It collates accounts of people who committed violent acts after starting antidepressants. It sets these cases alongside research that reports such extreme reactions.

== Filmography ==
Filmography
Year	Title	Role	Notes
2022	Rich & Shameless: "Girls Gone Wild Exposed"	Director	Documentary episode (TNT)
2014	Left for Dead by the Yorkshire Ripper	Director	TV film (Channel 5)
2008	Locked Up Abroad: "South Korea"	Director	TV episode (National Geographic)
2008	Locked Up Abroad: "Malaysia"	Director	TV episode (National Geographic)
2007	Locked Up Abroad: "Peru (Krista and Jennifer's Story)"	Director	TV episode (National Geographic)
2006	Bodyshock: "Half Ton Man"	Producer	Credited as Katinka Blackford Newman
1994	Forty Minutes: "Caraline's Story"	Producer	Credited as Katinka Blackford (BBC)
