= Joe Francis =

American criminal and founder of Girls Gone Wild (born 1973)

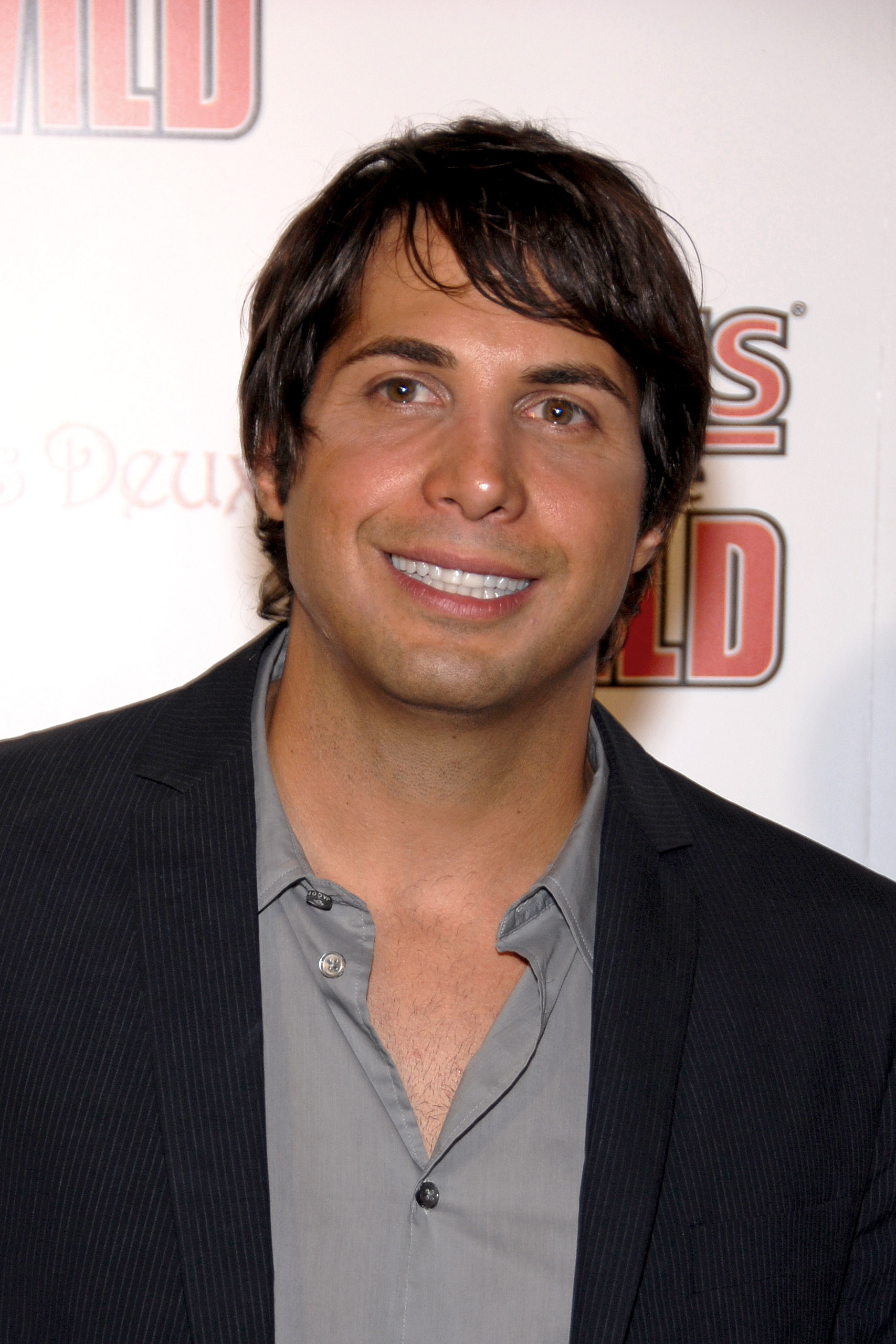
- Francis in 2008
- Born: Joseph R. Francis; April 1, 1973 (age 53); Atlanta, Georgia, U.S.
- Education: University of Southern California
- Occupations: Entrepreneur, film producer
- Known for: Founder of Girls Gone Wild, Banned from Television
- Partner: Abbey Wilson (2012–2021)
- Children: 2
- Convictions: False imprisonment (3 counts); Assault with great bodily injury Prostitution; Child abuse Tax evasion Bribery

Details
- Victims: 3+

Joseph R. Francis (born April 1, 1973) is an American softcore pornographer, criminal, and fugitive. He is the founder and creator of the Girls Gone Wild entertainment brand. Francis worked as a production assistant on the syndicated program Real TV (1996) before releasing the direct-to-video film Banned from Television (1998).

Francis has, on several occasions, been convicted of bribery, false imprisonment, assault causing great bodily injury, dissuading a witness, record-keeping violations and tax evasion; in 2015, he pleaded no contest to child abuse and prostitution. Also in 2015, after being convicted for imprisoning three women at his Hollywood home (and assaulting one of them), he fled the United States and has lived at his residence in Punta Mita, Nayarit, Mexico, ever since, attempting to avoid extradition. Francis has since faced more sexual assault allegations, including allegations of engaging in sex with underage partners and nonconsensual sexual encounters with multiple women.

== Early life and education ==
Joe Francis was born on April 1, 1973, in Atlanta, Georgia, to parents Raymond and Maria Francis, the latter of whom was from Austria. According to Francis, when he was seven years old, the family moved to Newport Beach, California, where he attended Our Lady Queen of Angels Catholic Elementary School, and then a series of boarding schools. As a teenager, he lived in Laguna Beach and attended Laguna Beach High School. His first job was at a computer and video store.

Francis attended the University of Southern California's Business Administration program, concentrating his education at the Lloyd Greif Center for Entrepreneurial Studies. He also took several courses in film and television, graduating in 1995 with a bachelor's degree from the USC Entrepreneurial Program.

== Business ventures ==
=== Banned from Television ===
Francis's first business venture began while working as a production assistant for Real TV, a syndicated reality television program that aired footage of extraordinary events that were not usually covered on mainstream news networks; it was then that Francis came up with the idea for Banned from Television. During his time at Real TV, people who worked in the studio would often view footage involving car accidents, violent crimes, and other graphic incidents. Francis licensed the footage, which he then sold through the Banned from Television videos, which he marketed via infomercials. The first Banned from Television video was released in 1998, followed by two sequels that were also released the same year. Some of the more famous footage included in the series was: Luis Donaldo Colosio's assassination, the rampage and death of circus elephant Tyke in Hawaii, the executions of Roberto Girón and Pedro Castillo, the Royal Jomtien Resort Hotel fire, and the death of Mary T. Wojtyla, a woman hit by a speeding train in Downers Grove, Illinois.

Other footage included: the murder of Pete Shrum, the murder of Lea Mek, the murder of Kevin Ramsay by Konstantinos Fotopoulos and Deidre Hunt, the attempted suicide of Terry Rossland, the 1998 Cúa hostage crisis, a 1990 Lucas Oil 200 (ARCA) race in which Slick Johnson was killed and paramedic Mike Staley injured, and the deaths of motorcycle stunt riders Corey Scott and Butch Laswell. Due to the films' graphic content, Francis stopped the series after three films, because he found it too disturbing to watch them back-to-back. While viewing footage for inclusion on Banned from Television, Francis came across footage of female college students flashing their breasts during Mardi Gras in New Orleans and at various spring break parties. It was this footage that sparked Francis's next business venture with Girls Gone Wild.

The first film in the series was rejected by the British Board of Film Classification for sensationalizing real-world graphic violence and was also refused a classification by the Australian Classification Board in 2007.

=== Girls Gone Wild ===
Francis created the Girls Gone Wild franchise in 1997 when he began using direct-response marketing, such as infomercials, to sell videos that he had produced. The videos were of college-aged women, often heavily intoxicated, who willingly exposed their bodies or acted wildly on camera. In its first two years, Girls Gone Wild made more than $20 million. By 2002, Francis had produced 83 different titles within the series, and was airing 30-minute infomercials on all major U.S. networks.

In 2005, the company planned to donate 100% of the gross sales of their Mardi Gras-themed DVDs to the Red Cross to help victims of Hurricane Katrina.

Abbey Wilson, who won the franchise's "Search for the Hottest Girl in America" contest in 2012, became Francis's long-term girlfriend. The two appeared on season 3 of the VH1 reality series Couples Therapy. In 2013, Wilson's iPad, containing private sexual videos of Francis and Wilson, was stolen; in retaliation, and to prevent distribution of the video before it was sold to any media outlets, his lawyer, David Houston, said that the thief, when caught, would be "prosecuted to the fullest extent of both the criminal and civil laws." In 2014, Wilson became pregnant with twins via in vitro fertilization. On October 7, 2014, she gave birth to two girls.

== Departure from the United States ==
As of December 2024, Francis lives outside the United States, where he faces mounting legal troubles. Since 2015, he has lived regularly in Mexico. Francis and Abbey Wilson separated in 2021, and have since been engaged in a legal battle over the custody of their two daughters, who have lived with their mother in the United States.

== Legal issues ==
=== Civil ===
In June 2007, Ashley Alexandra Dupré alleged that Francis and his company filmed her without permission, but she dropped her lawsuit after Francis released footage proving her consent. The following year, four women sued Girls Gone Wild for allegedly filming them as minors. Francis represented himself for part of the trial, until the judge cited him for contempt of court and fined him $2,500 for asking a plaintiff during cross-examination if she was a prostitute. Francis hired two lawyers that same day to represent him for the duration of the trial.

In February 2012, Clark County, Nevada, judge Mark Denton awarded $7.5 million to businessman Steve Wynn for defamatory statements made by Francis. In September 2012, a jury awarded a further $20 million to Wynn in a slander case against Francis, claiming that Wynn had threatened to kill him over a gambling debt. Francis's witnesses all denied hearing Wynn make such threats. The jury added an additional $20 million in punitive damages. In November 2012, Judge Joanne O'Donnell reduced Wynn's award to $19 million, reasoning that the jury's decision was "speculative" and formed based on their dislike of Francis.

As part of his January 2015 no contest plea to child abuse and prostitution charges, Francis also agreed to settle a 2003 lawsuit which involved allegations of videotaping the exposed breasts of underage girls.

=== Criminal ===
==== State ====
In 2003, officials in Panama City Beach, Florida, attempted to halt Girls Gone Wild from filming, prompting Francis to sue them for violating his First Amendment rights. The same officials arrested Francis for racketeering; he was released on bond. At a July 2006 hearing, the judge disallowed most of the evidence and in January 2007 dismissed most of the charges. Francis pleaded guilty to record-keeping violations, was fined $1.6 million and sentenced to community service. Francis later pleaded guilty for having contraband in his cell. He served 339 days and paid over $60,000 in fines.

In January 2011, Francis brought a group of three women to his home, leading to five charges: three misdemeanor counts of false imprisonment, one of assault causing great bodily injury, and one of dissuading a witness. On May 6, 2013, Francis was convicted on all five charges. He faced a maximum of five years in prison and/or $13,000 in fines. On May 22, 2013, Francis gave an interview to The Hollywood Reporter, in which he claimed the jurors were jealous of "who" he is, calling them "mentally fucking retarded" and suggesting they "should be euthanized". Furthermore, he called for the jury to be arrested and executed in prison by firing squad. He later apologized for his remarks, saying that he had been manipulated by the media.

On August 27, 2013, Francis was sentenced to serve at least 270 days in county jail, 36 months' probation, and was ordered to complete a Level 3 anger management course and a year of psychological counseling. Francis's attorneys immediately filed a new trial petition.

On March 25, 2015, Francis was sentenced to 336 days in jail after pleading no contest to child abuse and prostitution charges stemming from the filming of underage girls during taping of the Girls Gone Wild series in the popular spring break destination of Panama City, Florida. However, the judge credited him for a year of time previously served in Reno, Nevada, and so he did not serve any additional jail time. He was placed on a six month period of probation and barred from filming in the area for a period of three years. His lawyers claimed that the girls had lied about their ages to a cameraman and that the footage was never published.

==== Federal ====
In April 2007, in Reno, Nevada, Francis was indicted by a grand jury for two counts of tax evasion. The Department of Justice alleged that Francis claimed over $20 million in false deductions on his corporate returns in 2002 and 2003.

In April 2008, the venue for the trial was changed to the United States District Court for the Central District of California. At a hearing in July 2008, Francis pleaded not guilty to tax evasion. His attorney, Robert Bernhoft, said that tax returns for the businesses were prepared and filed by a former accountant and not shown to Francis. Bernhoft said that when the accountant left the company, he reported the returns to the Internal Revenue Service (IRS) to collect a bonus from the Tax Whistleblower Program.

In September 2009, Francis pleaded guilty to misdemeanor counts of filing a false return and bribery. He received credit for time served. In November 2009, U.S. District Judge S. James Otero accepted Francis's plea including $250,000 in restitution to the IRS.

=== Blackmailed ===
In 2004, Riley Perez (also known as Darnell Riley-Perez) broke into Francis's home where he filmed a humiliating blackmail video and arranged for payment so that the video did not go viral. Held at gunpoint, Francis was forced to disrobe on camera, and made to lie on the floor with his hands tied behind his back. Riley has since published a book in which he claimed that he was asked to do so by mafia criminals, stating “I was asked to rough him up," and “I worked with guys [who], if they told you to do something, you don’t [didn't] ask questions." To further intimidate him, a sex toy resembling a penis was placed near Francis's head during the filming of the video; both parties have claimed that no sexual activity or assault occurred during the incident, with the toy apparently being used as a humiliation tactic.

=== Bankruptcy ===
Francis's corporation GGW Brands, the parent company for the Girls Gone Wild entertainment brand, filed for bankruptcy in February 2013. The bankruptcy was meant to block Wynn Resorts from seizing the assets of the company for repayment of Francis's gambling debts.

In May 2015, a U.S. District Court judge issued an arrest warrant for Francis after he failed to comply with terms of his bankruptcy agreement. As of 2015, he was reportedly living in Mexico with his girlfriend and their twin daughters. Extradition treaties between the U.S. and Mexico are not applicable for civil contempt warrants.

=== Girls Gone Wild Exposed special ===
An episode of the TNT true crime anthology series Rich & Shameless called Girls Gone Wild Exposed aired on TNT on April 23, 2022, and featured accounts from alleged victims of Joe Francis, as well as a recorded verbal altercation between Francis and his wife, who is now estranged from him.

=== Girls Gone Wild: The Untold Story documentary series ===
In May 2023, journalist Scaachi Koul wrote in a Huffington Post article that she was investigating former pornographic film franchise Girls Gone Wild. She interviewed Francis for nine hours at his Casa Aramara residency in Punta Mita, Mexico. On December 3, 2024, the three episode documentary series Girls Gone Wild: The Untold Story, which detailed Koul's investigation of Francis and Girls Gone Wild, became available to stream on Peacock. Among the things detailed in the documentary were Francis's influence, including his influence on popular culture, and sexual abuse allegations against him and Girls Gone Wild. Francis, who was among those interviewed for the documentary, was living outside of the United States in Mexico, where Kohl interviewed him in 2022. In the documentary, multiple people, including one of his former cameramen, alleged that Francis had in fact engaged in sexual encounters with minors, and that some of these encounters, no matter the age, were non-consensual. During Francis's interview with Koul, when asked about allegations of rape against his ex partner Abbey Wilson, Francis responded that "You can’t rape your partner."

== See also ==
- Casa Aramara (estate in Punta Mita, Mexico, built by Francis)
