= John Stanton (journalist) =

American journalist

John J. Stanton (1956–2023) was an independent journalist, author, and a former teacher in the Washington, DC metropolitan area. His work focused largely on national security and cultural topics, including writings on these matters and others over a 35 year time period. He covered a wide range of topics from cyberterrorism to orphan nukes and American education and healthcare. His work has been cited in academia and military studies extensively. He designed and led a graduate level seminar titled National Security in the 21st Century at a private school in Northern Virginia. He was suspended from the Arlington Public School System as a school-based substitute for supporting "Putin's logic", based on Putin's perception of the threat to Russia's security posed by NATO expansion and U.S. military and economic support for the Ukrainian government. He also encouraged students to read as many sources as possible on the ongoing conflict, to include "Russian propaganda," plus the New York Times, Washington Post, and dozens of other news outlets pro and con on the war. A video of his remarks was taken by a student in the class. He did not appeal his termination.

== Subjects covered ==
=== Inside Sputnik News Agency ===
In April 2018, Stanton, who had been Sputnik News Agency's Pentagon Correspondent for roughly two years, published a report highly critical of Sputnik News, Sputnik Radio, and RIA Novosti, declaring that the organizations were part of a larger Russian Information Warfare Operation. His public findings were part of an insider research effort while at Sputnik on behalf of the US government.

In May 2018 PBS NewsHour published an article in which Stanton said that Sputnik mixes "real with unreal" and uses "dubious sources." He also said that to pin down what he found problematic was difficult because proving disinformation can be impossibly slippery.

=== Cyberwarfare and technology commentary ===
Stanton wrote on cyberwarfare/information warfare in the 1994–2000 timeframe when the Bill Clinton Administration was pushing cyber defense initiatives. Other articles discussed technical matters such as electromagnetic pulse affects, urban warfare, orphan nukes and intelligence after 9/11. He presented papers on Asynchronous Transfer Mode, Strategic Cultural Analysis and Evolutionary Cognitive Neuroscience. He is the author of "Broadband Communications Networks and Multimedia: Public and Private Sector Initiatives", a paper for the 19th Annual Meeting of the Technology Transfer Society in 1994.

=== Human Terrain System ===
Stanton authored over 100 articles over a five-year period on the US Army's (United States Army Training and Doctrine Command (TRADOC)) Human Terrain System (HTS). He also appeared on Russia Today to comment on HTS. His coverage on the Human Terrain System was cited in the American Anthropological Association's Commission on the Engagement of Anthropology with the US Security and Intelligence Communities, Final Report.

His last work on the US Army Human Terrain System was titled Last Waltz in Saga of US Army Intelligence Program published by the Sri Lanka Guardian, Pravda, Dissident Voice and Scoop-NZ in December 2013.

=== National security and political commentary ===
He wrote articles for online publications such as Pravda.ru, Sri Lanka Guardian, CounterPunch, Cryptome, The Intelligence Daily (IntelDaily), Journal of Technology Transfer, Seoul Times, and TRDEFENCE (Turkish Military & Geopolitics Portal). He has also written for National Defense Magazine, Defense Daily, American Behavioral Scientist and Convergence Magazine. His work has been cited by information security researchers.

Stanton's analysis on homeland security issues, following the events of September 11, 2001, was carried by Investors Business Daily, CBS Evening News, ABC and CNN.

=== Healthcare in The United States ===
Stanton's experience with the troubled US healthcare system in the state of Virginia was documented in 2022 in an article titled Surviving America's Industrial Manufacturing, Quality Centric Healthcare System,

An earlier experience in 2015 was documented in Home Healthcare Now titled Human Touch Trumps Technology.

== Publications ==
=== Books ===
- Tectonic Geopolitical, Social and Cultural Shifts in the USA. 2022. p. 134. ISBN 979-8367768558.
- Dispatches from the American Madhouse. 2022. p. 151. ISBN 979-8415377350.
- Stanton, John (2021). How the World Ends. Amazon Digital Services LLC - KDP Print US. p. 98. ISBN 979-8528380650.
- Stanton, John Jeffrey (2020). America 2020: A Nation in Turmoil. Independently Published. p. 126. ISBN 979-8619455953.
- Stanton, John (2016). US Military's Progressiveness Leaves Civil Society Behind. CreateSpace Independent Publishing Platform. p. 154. ISBN 978-1539142416.
- Stanton, John (2015). La máquina de guerra caníbal. Melusina. p. 136. ISBN 978-84-15373-27-8.
- Stanton, John (2013). US Army's Human Terrain System 2008–2013: The Program from Hell. CreateSpace Independent Publishing Platform. p. 207. ISBN 978-1491063927.
- Cyber Noodles, Orphan Nukes and the Failure of the US National Security State. 2013. Amazon's Create Space (self publishing). ISBN 978-1484899045.
- The Raptor's Eye: JIEDDO, MISO, General P and the Prophet Smith. USA: Amazon. 2012. p. 134. ISBN 978-1480276413.
- General David Petraeus' Favorite Mushroom: Inside the US Army's Human Terrain System. Wiseman Publishing. 2009. p. 189. ISBN 978-9089630193. OCLC 677926603.
- Talking Politics with God and the Devil in Washington, DC. PublishAmerica. 2007. p. 151. ISBN 978-1424191246.
- America 2004: A Power But Not Super. Tempe, AZ: Dandelion Enterprises. 2004. p. 156. ISBN 978-1893302266. OCLC 68679199.
- America's Nightmare: The Presidency of George Bush II. Tempe, AZ: Dandelion Enterprises. 2003. p. 173. ISBN 978-1893302297. OCLC 55941597. (with co-author Wayne Madsen)
