= Girls Gone Wild (franchise) =

Adult entertainment franchise

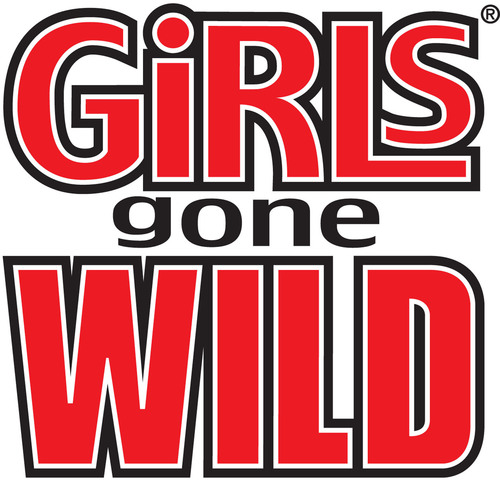
- Created by: Joe Francis
- Original work: DVD

Films and television
- Films: Over 300 films 1997–2013 (Under Joe Francis)

Girls Gone Wild (GGW) was an adult entertainment franchise created by Joe Francis in 1997, who occasionally appeared as the host of the videos.

Girls Gone Wild was known for its early use of direct-response marketing techniques, including its late-night infomercials that began airing in 1997. The videos typically involve camera crews at party locations engaging young college-aged women who expose their bodies or act "wild", especially during spring break. Since 2008, the Girls Gone Wild products have been sold primarily through their website as streaming videos, downloads, and DVDs.

In February 2013, the company filed for Chapter 11 bankruptcy.

In 2014, the company was sold to Bang Bros.

== Background ==
The first Girls Gone Wild film was released in 1997. In 2001, the company sold 4.5 million videos and DVDs. By the end of 2002, the company had produced 83 different titles and had begun airing 30-minute infomercials on E! Entertainment Television, Fox Sports Net, BET, Comedy Central, TechTV, Style, and all other major American networks. The infomercials targeted a late-night channel-surfing demographic that Joe Francis had identified in the late 1990s. According to TNS Media Intelligence, Girls Gone Wild spent more than $21 million in advertising in 2003, becoming the largest advertiser for programs on the E! channel. In 2008, Francis' net worth was approximately $150 million.

Instances of Girls Gone Wild in popular culture include the appearance of Eminem and Snoop Dogg in the company's videos, as well as various references and parodies of the show in popular television series and movies. MGM announced in 2002 that it would release a feature-length film based on the Girls Gone Wild concept.

=== Content ===
Most Girls Gone Wild videos follow a common formula in which a film crew interacts with a large crowd of people either at a party, club, or other event. Women willingly take off their clothes, engage in sexual activities, or participate in wet T-shirt contests. Compensation for taking part in a Girls Gone Wild video often consists of a free hat, T-shirt, or money. Occasionally, participants are invited to be filmed on a Girls Gone Wild tour bus.

=== Distribution channels ===
At its inception, Girls Gone Wild marketed its product, namely videos, through direct-distribution channels such as infomercials, pay-per-view, video on demand and internationally by Ballistic Distribution. This distribution was followed in 2008 by the launch of a Girls Gone Wild magazine, a clothing line, and a compilation record released on Jive Records.

== Girls Gone Wild for Katrina ==
In September 2005, Girls Gone Wild announced that it would donate all proceeds of Mardi Gras–themed DVDs and videos to the Red Cross. Proceeds from the video sales, which included a title featuring Snoop Dogg, were intended to help the victims of Hurricane Katrina.

== Guys Gone Wild ==
In 2004, Girls Gone Wild began soliciting men for participation in their videos. Guys Gone Wild was a video series and male analogue of Girls Gone Wild targeted at young women. These video tapes and DVDs featured much the same content as the Girls equivalent, only instead showing young men performing for the camera—e.g., in the shower, playing football naked, etc.

In an article, Bill Horn, spokesman for Mantra Entertainment (which produced the videos), notes a gender-related double standard in these videos. In the Girls Gone Wild series, sometimes the young women kiss, while the guys' series does not have that feature. Horn explains: "Let's face it, there's a double standard when it comes to guy-on-guy as opposed to girl-on-girl. It's sexy to see two girls making out. It's not considered sexy to see two guys making out. That's just the reality, and, we were there to capture the reality."

The hour-long Guys Gone Wild productions featured women camera operators who encouraged men to get naked and perform strip teases.

== Lawsuits and criminal charges ==
In 2002, the company settled with a Florida State University student named Becky Lynn Gritzke. The young woman had flashed her breasts at Mardi Gras the year before and the company used video and an image of her for promotional material. Gritzke argued that her privacy had been violated but the company countered that removing one's clothing in public meant forfeiting one's right to privacy.

In 2003, the U.S. Department of Justice filed a complaint against Girls Gone Wild alleging that the company failed to notify customers when they purchased subscriptions under a continuity program, rather than single DVDs. In 2004, GGW settled for $1.1 million and agreed to disclose all terms and get consent for recurring charges.

In 2006, Girls Gone Wild marketer MRA Holdings pleaded guilty to charges for failing to record the ages of its subjects in 2002 and 2003. The parties agreed to pay $2.1 million in restitution and fines.

In 2008, Ashley Dupré filed against Joe Francis and other defendants claiming that they filmed her without consent. She later dropped the suit, commenting through her attorney that she wanted to focus on positive opportunities in her life.

In 2008, a Missouri woman claimed that she was filmed without consent when a Girls Gone Wild contractor removed her halter top at a St. Louis bar. A jury found that she consented. On re-trial, a judge awarded the woman $5.77 million after the defense failed to show at court. On appeal, the judge upheld the verdict.

In March 2008, four women claimed that they suffered emotional distress by being shown in Girls Gone Wild film. In April 2011, a jury declined to award damages to the plaintiffs. However, in January 2015, Francis agreed to settle a separate 2003 lawsuit that involved allegations of him taping the exposed breasts of underage girls as part of Girls Gone Wild content. The 2015 civil settlement also involved Francis agreeing to serve 336 days in jail after accepting a no contest plea to criminal charges of child abuse and prostitution.

=== Bankruptcy ===
In 2013, GGW Brands LLC filed for Chapter 11 bankruptcy protection.

=== Accounts from alleged sex victims and Francis' departure from the United States ===
An episode of the TNT true crime anthology series Rich & Shameless called Girls Gone Wild Exposed aired on TNT on April 23, 2022, and featured accounts from alleged victims of Joe Francis, as well as a recorded verbal altercation between Francis and his wife, who was revealed to now be estranged from him. On December 3, 2024, the three episode documentary series Girls Gone Wild: The Untold Story, which included details about the sex abuse allegations against Francis and Girls Gone Wild through the perspective of an investigation by Scaachi Koul, became available to stream on Peacock. Francis, who was among those interviewed for the documentary, was revealed to have been living outside of the United States in Mexico since 2015, where he was interviewed by Koul in 2022. In Girls Gone Wild: The Untold Story, multiple people, including a former Girls Gone Wild cameraman, alleged that Francis engaged in sex with minors, and that some of his sexual encounters, no matter the age, were nonconsensual.
