= Punta Mita =

Seaside resort in Nayarit, Mexico

Punta Mita Punta de Mita
- Seaside Resort
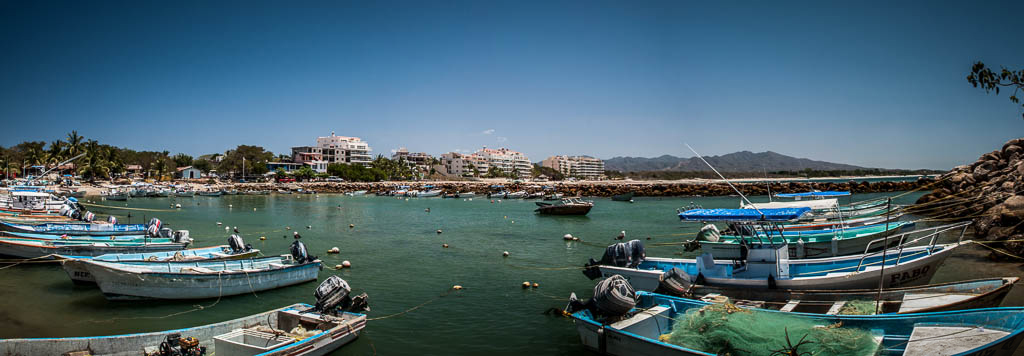
- The Punta Mita fishing fleet
- Interactive map of Punta Mita
- Coordinates: 20°46′30.72″N 105°31′37.2″W
- Country: Mexico
- State: Nayarit
- Municipality: Bahía de Banderas

Population (2020)
  - Total: 2,564
- Time zone: UTC−7 (MST)
  - Summer (DST): UTC−6 (MDT)
- Postal code: 63
- Website: www.puntamita.com

Punta Mita is a 1,500-acre (6.1 km^{2}) private peninsula on the north end of Banderas Bay in the Mexican state of Nayarit, about 10 miles (16 km) north of Puerto Vallarta, Jalisco. It is home to the Four Seasons Punta Mita, St. Regis Punta Mita, Conrad Hilton, and 16 sub-communities. There is evidence of pre-Columbian era human settlement in Nayarit. On the Punta Mita peninsula, a hilltop archaeological site known as Careyeros Hill has been dated to c. 800 AD.

Punta Mita is surrounded on three sides by nine and a half miles of Pacific Ocean beaches and coves including Litibu Bay.

Punta Mita is at the same latitude as the Hawaiian Islands. It is kept comfortable year round by gentle sea breezes, with average summer temperatures around 85 °F (29 °C), and 75 °F (24 °C) during winter months. Because of its mild tropical climate, Punta Mita is a popular vacation spot.

The Islas Marietas National Park is a 15-minute boat ride from Punta Mita.

== Entrepreneurial ecosystem ==
In November 2012, several prominent Silicon Valley entrepreneurs and investors launched a structured mentoring program and early-stage seed fund in partnership with the MITA Institute and Tech Accelerator. The MITA Institute hosts an annual "Tech Talks" conference in Punta Mita, which brings together venture capital and tech leaders from both the U.S. and Mexico.

Through his Cascade Investment, Bill Gates acquired the Punta Mita Four Seasons resort and adjacent land for $200 million in 2014, reportedly with the aim of attracting even more technology executives to the region.

== In popular culture ==
Casa Tau was the filming location for Too Hot to Handle, a reality television dating show that was released on Netflix on 17 April 2020.

== Climate ==
Punta Mita has a tropical wet and dry climate (Köppen Aw) featuring stable, warm temperatures all year round, with two marked seasons, a dry season from November through May, and a wet season from June through October, during this season hurricanes may threaten the village. UV radiation levels are high all year round, ranging from 7 in January and December, to 11+ between April and September. From mid-May to mid-November the heat and humidity can be uncomfortable in Punta Mita. The most comfortable weather in Punta Mita generally occurs from late December to the end of March.

Climate data for Punta Mita, Nayarit
Month	Jan	Feb	Mar	Apr	May	Jun	Jul	Aug	Sep	Oct	Nov	Dec	Year
Record high °C (°F)	35 (95)	35 (95)	34 (93)	36 (97)	34 (93)	39 (102)	38 (100)	35 (95)	37 (99)	38 (100)	37 (99)	36 (97)	39 (102)
Mean daily maximum °C (°F)	29 (84)	29 (84)	29 (84)	31 (88)	32 (90)	33 (91)	33 (91)	33 (91)	33 (91)	32 (90)	32 (90)	29 (84)	31.2 (88.2)
Daily mean °C (°F)	22 (72)	22 (72)	22 (72)	23.5 (74.3)	25.5 (77.9)	27.5 (81.5)	27.5 (81.5)	27.5 (81.5)	27.5 (81.5)	26.5 (79.7)	25 (77)	22.5 (72.5)	24.9 (76.8)
Mean daily minimum °C (°F)	15 (59)	15 (59)	15 (59)	16 (61)	19 (66)	22 (72)	22 (72)	22 (72)	22 (72)	21 (70)	18 (64)	16 (61)	18.5 (65.3)
Record low °C (°F)	9 (48)	9 (48)	9 (48)	9 (48)	10 (50)	16 (61)	17 (63)	21 (70)	11 (52)	17 (63)	14 (57)	9 (48)	9 (48)
Average precipitation mm (inches)	23 (0.9)	10 (0.4)	7 (0.3)	5 (0.2)	6 (0.2)	170 (6.7)	319 (12.6)	337 (13.3)	329 (13.0)	121 (4.8)	20 (0.8)	23 (0.9)	1,370 (53.9)
Average precipitation days (≥ 0.1 mm)	1	1	1	0	1	11	19	18	17	7	1	2	79
Mean monthly sunshine hours	217	224	248	240	248	210	186	186	180	217	210	186	2,552
Mean daily sunshine hours	7	8	8	8	8	7	6	6	6	7	7	6	7
Source: Weather2Travel

Punta Mita mean sea temperature
Jan	Feb	Mar	Apr	May	Jun	Jul	Aug	Sep	Oct	Nov	Dec
25 °C (77 °F)	24 °C (75 °F)	24 °C (75 °F)	25 °C (77 °F)	26 °C (79 °F)	28 °C (82 °F)	29 °C (84 °F)	30 °C (86 °F)	30 °C (86 °F)	29 °C (84 °F)	28 °C (82 °F)	26 °C (79 °F)

The temperature of the sea is quite stable, with lows of 24 °C (75 °F) between February – March, and a high of 30 °C (86 °F) in August - September.

== See also ==
- Sayulita
