= Sports in the Las Vegas metropolitan area =

The Las Vegas metropolitan area, alternately known as the Las Vegas Valley is home to several professional and amateur sports teams. Currently, the Las Vegas Valley has two major professional league teams: the Vegas Golden Knights of the National Hockey League (NHL), which began play in 2017 as the region's first major pro team, and the Las Vegas Raiders of the National Football League (NFL) which began play in 2020 after relocating from Oakland, California. The Athletics of Major League Baseball (MLB) plan to move to Las Vegas to play at a new ballpark which is estimated to be complete by 2028 after relocating from Oakland and West Sacramento, California.

When this relocation happens, Las Vegas will have progressed from being the largest market in the U.S. with no teams in the men's major professional leagues to being one of the smallest markets with at least three such teams within less than a decade. (Note: Cincinnati, Kansas City, Cleveland, and Nashville all have equal or smaller markets with three major men's sports teams.) In addition, the National Basketball Association (NBA) has publicly confirmed Las Vegas is being considered for an expansion franchise to begin play by 2028, which would potentially make Las Vegas by far the fastest market to progress from no teams in the "Big Four" leagues to having teams in all four leagues.

In women's sports, the Las Vegas area hosts the Las Vegas Aces of the Women's National Basketball Association (WNBA) and the Vegas Vanguards of the Professional Women's Hockey League (PWHL). The area is also home to three minor league sports teams: the Las Vegas Aviators of the Pacific Coast League (Minor League Baseball), Las Vegas Lights FC of the USL Championship, and the Henderson Silver Knights of the American Hockey League. The Las Vegas Lights is currently the only team playing in the city of Las Vegas, at the city-owned Cashman Field.

The University of Nevada, Las Vegas (UNLV), located just off the Las Vegas Strip in Paradise, fields National Collegiate Athletic Association (NCAA) Division I athletic teams. Allegiant Stadium, located in Paradise, hosts the Las Vegas Raiders, UNLV football, and the Las Vegas Bowl, an annual NCAA bowl game. The Las Vegas Motor Speedway (LVMS) just north of the city hosts NASCAR's Cup Series and other automotive events. The Professional Rodeo Cowboys Association's National Finals Rodeo is held annually at the Thomas & Mack Center on the UNLV campus, and the Professional Bull Riders holds its annual Team Series Championship at T-Mobile Arena on the Strip.

Bandy in the United States has for most of its existence exclusively been played in Minnesota. However, after the 1st annual Las Vegas Invitational Rink Bandy Tournament, when there were zero local bandy players, there were 100 at the time of the 2nd tournament, with 2 local teams participating, including Bandy Club of Las Vegas (BCLV).

The Las Vegas Valley has been the site of many prominent combat sports events, such as boxing and MMA, with Las Vegas being considered by many as the "fight capital of the world".

Visitors and residents also have many options for boating, golf, hiking, and rock climbing. The city has many parks which offer a wide range of activities.

== List of teams ==
=== Major professional teams ===
Team	Sport	League	Venue (capacity)	Established	Titles
Las Vegas Raiders	Football	NFL	Allegiant Stadium (65,000)	1960	3 (Note: Two titles were won when the team was based in Oakland, California and one was won when it was based in Los Angeles, California.)
Vegas Golden Knights	Ice hockey	NHL	T-Mobile Arena (17,500)	2017	1
Las Vegas Athletics	Baseball	MLB	New Las Vegas Stadium (33,000)	1901	9 (Note: Five titles were won when the team was based in Philadelphia, Pennsylvania and four were won during the team's time in Oakland, California.)

=== Notable women's teams ===
Team	Sport	League	Venue (capacity)	Established	Titles
Las Vegas Aces	Women's basketball	WNBA	Michelob Ultra Arena (12,000)	2018	3
Vegas Vanguards	Women's ice hockey	PWHL	T-Mobile Arena (17,500)	2026	0

=== Minor professional teams ===
Team	Sport	League	Venue (capacity)	Established	Titles
Las Vegas Aviators	Baseball	MiLB (AAA-PCL)	Las Vegas Ballpark (10,000)	1983	3
Las Vegas Royals	Basketball	ABA	Michelob Ultra Arena (12,000)	2020	0
Henderson Silver Knights	Ice hockey	AHL	Lee's Family Forum (5,567)	2020	0
Las Vegas Desert Dogs	Box lacrosse	NLL	Lee's Family Forum (5,567)	2021	0
Vegas Knight Hawks	Indoor Football	IFL	Lee's Family Forum (5,567)	2021	1
Las Vegas Lights FC	Soccer	USLC	Cashman Field (9,334)	2018	0
Las Vegas Legends	Soccer	NISA	Peter Johann Memorial Field (2,000)	2012	0
Las Vegas Silver Stars	Women's football	WNFC	Eldorado High School	2017	0
Sin City Trojans	Women's football	WFA	Desert Pines High School	2008	0
Fabulous Sin City Rollers	Women's roller derby	WFTDA	Las Vegas Roller Hockey Rink	2004	0
Vegas Thrill	Volleyball	MLV	Lee's Family Forum (5,567)	2023	0
Vegas Bighorns	Ultimate frisbee	UFA	Bonanza High School	2025	0

=== Amateur teams ===
Team	Sport	League	Venue (capacity)	Established	Titles
Las Vegas Gamblers	Australian rules football	USAFL	Bill Briare Park	2005	0
Vegas Jesters	Ice hockey	MWHL	City National Arena (600)	2012	0
Las Vegas Thunderbirds	Ice hockey	USPHL	City National Arena (600)	2019	0
Las Vegas Legends	Soccer	NPSL	Peter Johann Memorial Field (2,500)	2021	0

=== College teams ===
School	Team	League	Division	Primary Conference
University of Nevada, Las Vegas (UNLV)	UNLV Rebels	NCAA	NCAA Division I	Mountain West
College of Southern Nevada (CSN)	CSN Coyotes	NJCAA	NJCAA Division I	Scenic West

== History ==
Las Vegas was one of the largest cities in the United States without a major league sports team prior to the entry of the Golden Knights into the NHL. Due in part to perceived risks with legal sports betting, no major professional sports league had ever had a team in Las Vegas until the NHL announced its intent to launch an expansion team in the city in June 2016. The placement of a major league team in Las Vegas was an ongoing topic of discussion between city leaders and the professional sports leagues.

=== Past issues with major league sports ===
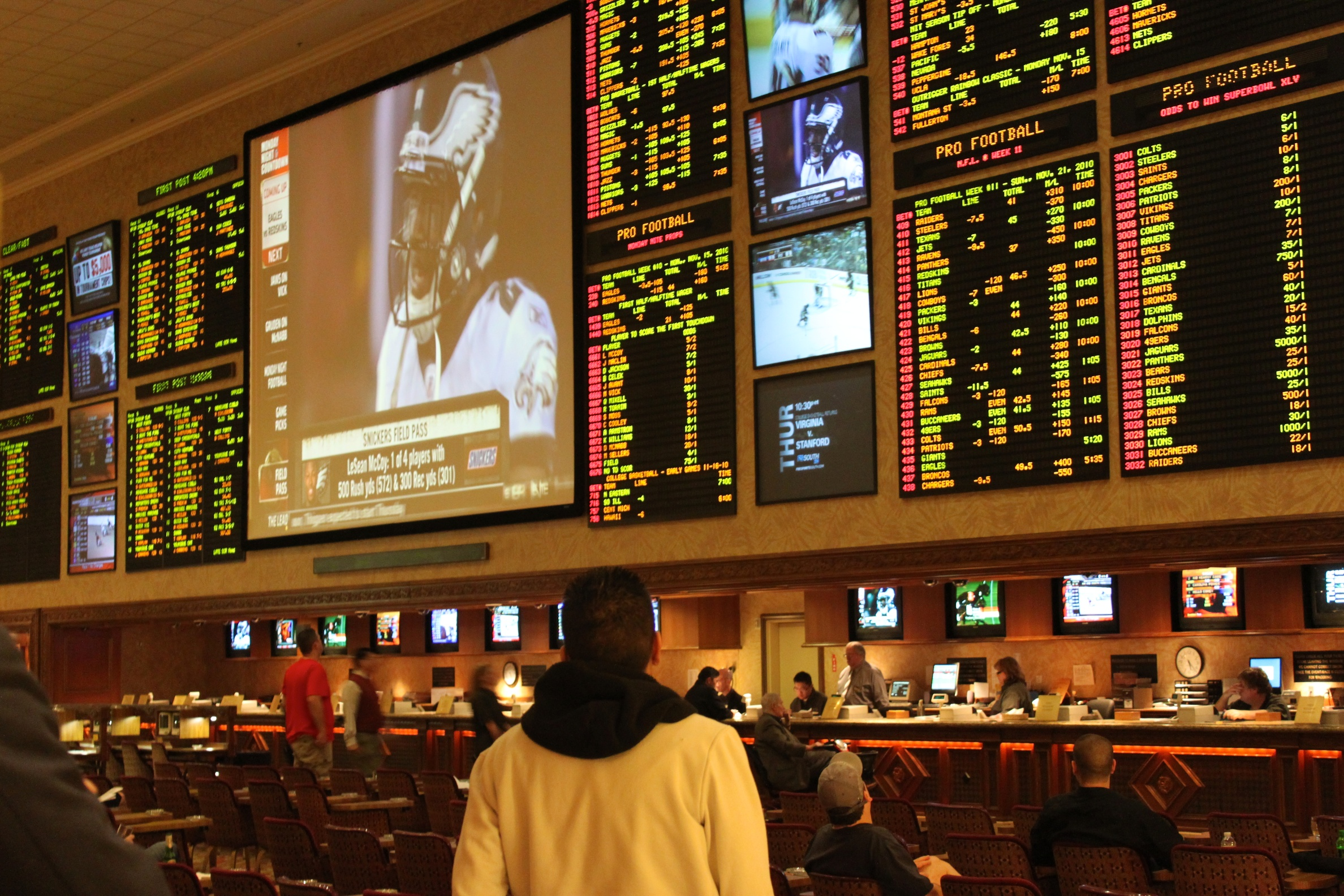
Professional sports leagues historically avoided Las Vegas due to legal sports betting.

Historically, the most prominent issue with sports in Las Vegas was the perceived problem of legal sports betting. Traditionally, all four major professional sports leagues had strong anti-gambling policies, prohibiting their personnel from having any involvement in gambling. The NFL took the toughest stance, even refusing to accept Las Vegas tourism advertising for Super Bowl telecasts and threatening to file suit against any local hotels holding Super Bowl parties. Hotels got around the legal threat by referring to the Super Bowl as "The Big Game" rather than its actual name in advertising. In addition, some potential owners believed a professional sports franchise would have difficulty gaining an audience, given Las Vegas's numerous entertainment options. A number of prior professional football teams in the city ranked at or near last in their leagues in attendance over the years, such as the Las Vegas Posse (Canadian Football League), the Las Vegas Locomotives (United Football League) and the Las Vegas Outlaws (Arena Football League). Las Vegas also has a high percentage of residents working in 24-hour occupations, many of whom work nights and weekends when most games would be played. The Las Vegas area also has a rather transient population, with a significant percentage of its residents being transplants, many of whom are loyal to the teams from their former cities and/or states, causing doubts that a professional sports team could gain an audience.

Several owners of other sports franchises disagreed. Miami Marlins owner Jeffrey Loria described Las Vegas as "a potential gold mine" for a professional sports team owner. Dallas Mavericks owner Mark Cuban was also quoted saying that Las Vegas would be a good professional sports town.

As the four leagues embraced daily fantasy sports (DFS) and various forms of both online and retail gambling such as state lotteries, Native American gaming and online/mobile sports betting became more prevalent, the ethical arguments that the four major leagues used to justify excluding Las Vegas from professional sports gradually weakened and the doors opened to major pro sports in the market; NBA Commissioner Adam Silver said he was in favor of regulated, legalized sports gambling.

Prior to the opening of T-Mobile Arena in April 2016, another major obstacle was the lack of suitable facilities. The city did not have a facility that was large enough or modern enough to host an MLB or NFL team. While the Thomas & Mack Center and MGM Grand Garden Arena were large enough on paper to host an NBA or NHL team, they were only suitable for temporary use due to age and/or design issues.

Harrah's Entertainment and the Anschutz Entertainment Group committed to building a new arena on a parcel of land behind Harrah's Paris and Bally's off the Strip, to be built to NHL and NBA standards. The arena was expected to open in the fall of 2010, but construction never began. Harrah's Entertainment CEO Gary Loveman said in a June 2009 article in the Las Vegas Business Press that his company was still committed to building the arena, but it was delayed by a lack of financing. On April 6, 2010, the Las Vegas Review-Journal reported that three proposals had been made to build an arena of approximately 20,000 seats on or near the Strip to host professional basketball and hockey, rodeo, concerts and other events. All three proposals called for public money to be used for a portion of the construction cost. On November 5, 2013, Las Vegas news media reported plans for a joint-venture arena to be built on the Strip with the backing parties being AEG and MGM Resorts. Located at a former parking lot at the back of the Monte Carlo, T-Mobile Arena seats 20,000 and costs $350 million. Ground was broken in May 2014, with its opening on April 6, 2016.

Cashman Field was replaced as a baseball venue by Las Vegas Ballpark in Summerlin in 2019 with Cashman being converted to full-time soccer use. Sam Boyd Stadium was replaced by Allegiant Stadium, which became the home of the Las Vegas Raiders and the UNLV Rebels football team beginning in 2020. Ground was broken for Allegiant Stadium on November 13, 2017, with its opening taking place on July 31, 2020.

== Major league professional teams ==
=== National Hockey League ===
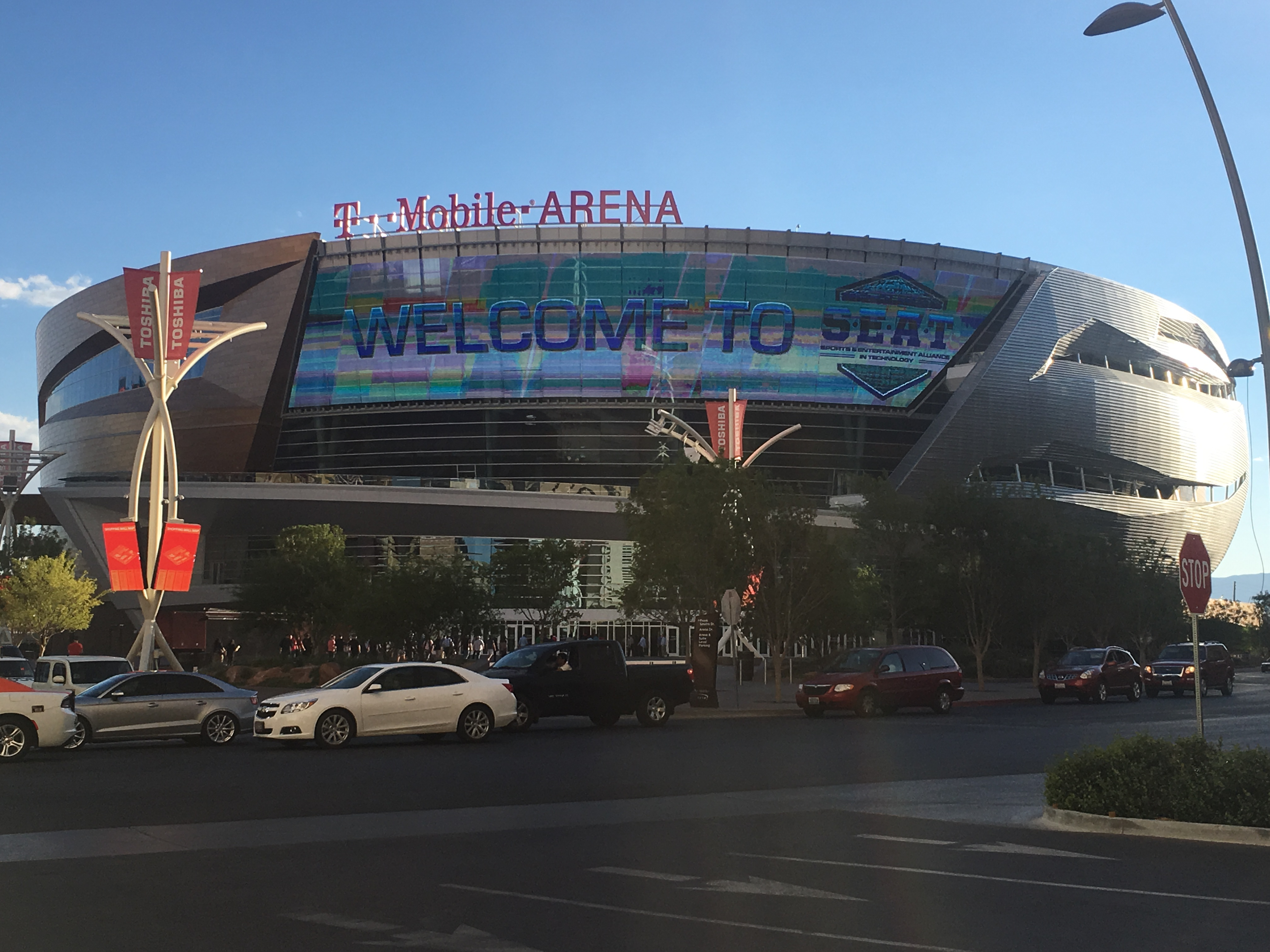
T-Mobile Arena, home of the Vegas Golden Knights

Las Vegas is the home to the Vegas Golden Knights of the National Hockey League (NHL). The Golden Knights are owned by Black Knight Sports & Entertainment, a consortium led by Bill Foley, and play at T-Mobile Arena. The Golden Knights began play during the 2017–18 NHL season and became the first major league professional team in Las Vegas. The Golden Knights also became the first NHL expansion team since the St. Louis Blues to reach the Stanley Cup Final in their first season only to lose to the Washington Capitals. The Golden Knights would later go on to win the 2023 Stanley Cup Final over the Florida Panthers, giving the Las Vegas metropolitan area and the state of Nevada its first championship from the Big Four. The Golden Knights advanced to the Stanley Cup Final in 2026 but lost to the Carolina Hurricanes.

Prior to the Golden Knights, the National Hockey League had experience with Las Vegas beginning in 1991, when an outdoor game was held in Las Vegas, with the Los Angeles Kings facing the New York Rangers outside Caesars Palace in a preseason exhibition game. It carried through the years with an annual preseason exhibition game called Frozen Fury which was held at the MGM Grand Garden Arena. The league has also held the NHL Awards ceremonies after each season since 2009.

=== National Football League ===
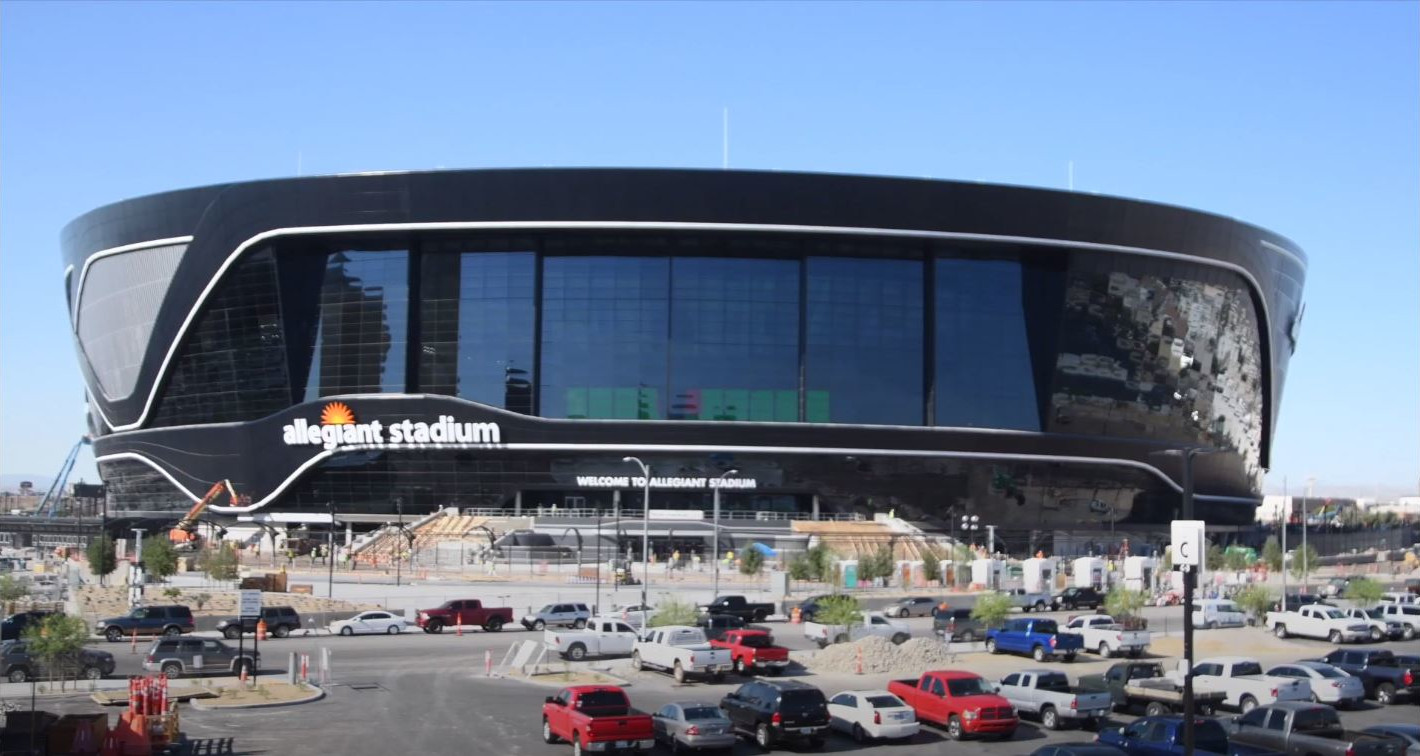
Allegiant Stadium, home of the Las Vegas Raiders and UNLV Rebels football team.

Las Vegas is home to the Las Vegas Raiders of the National Football League (NFL). The Raiders are controlled by principal owner and managing general partner Mark Davis and began play in Las Vegas in 2020. On March 27, 2017, NFL owners voted 31–1 to approve the Oakland Raiders' move to Las Vegas, though the team continued to play at the Oakland Coliseum in Oakland, California until their new stadium, Allegiant Stadium, was built in time for the 2020 NFL season.

Prior to the Raiders, professional football had been attempted three times in the area. The first two attempts, the XFL's Las Vegas Outlaws and the Canadian Football League's Las Vegas Posse, were unsuccessful, with both teams folding after only one season of play. The XFL folded outright, while the Posse were a failure at the box office, part of the CFL's failed U.S. expansion attempt. A third attempt at professional football was begun in the fall of 2009 with the United Football League's Las Vegas Locomotives; however, the franchise and the league folded in 2012. The Locomotives played in the league's first three championship games, winning the first two in 2009 and 2010. The first professional football game ever held in Las Vegas was an American Football League preseason contest between the Raiders and Houston Oilers at Cashman Field in 1964.

Allegiant Stadium hosted Super Bowl LVIII in 2024, with the Kansas City Chiefs beating the San Francisco 49ers 25-22 in overtime. Super Bowl LXIII will be hosted there in 2029.

=== Major League Baseball ===
The Athletics of Major League Baseball (MLB) plan to relocate to Las Vegas when their new $1.5 billion 33,000-seat ballpark is projected to be completed by 2028. In 2021, the Athletics, like the Raiders, began researching the possibility of relocating from Oakland to the Las Vegas area if their proposed ballpark at Howard Terminal to replace the aging Oakland Coliseum was not approved by the city government. In April 2023, the Athletics entered a land purchase agreement for the Wild Wild West Casino on the Las Vegas Strip, finalizing their plans to complete a new ballpark there and leave the Oakland area. This was later modified to have the new ballpark built on the site of the Tropicana Las Vegas resort and casino in a joint venture with Bally's Corporation with the team eventually reaching an agreement with the state of Nevada and Clark County to provide public funding for the project with a completion date of 2028. The stadium agreement then received a bill known as SB1 which was approved by most legislators in the Nevada Legislature by June 2023 during a special session and signed into law by Governor Joe Lombardo. Previously, the Athletics played six home games at Cashman Field during the 1996 MLB season when the renovations for the Coliseum were not yet complete. On November 16, the Athletics received approval from MLB to officially relocate to Las Vegas in 2028. In August 2025, it was announced that the Athletics would play six home games during the 2026 MLB season at Las Vegas Ballpark.

Prior to the Athletics, MLB considered Las Vegas as a potential home for the Montreal Expos. The lack of a baseball park that could be quickly reconfigured for Major League Baseball cost the city any chance of landing the team. MLB eventually chose Washington, D.C. for the Expos, who became the Washington Nationals, primarily because the city agreed to provide a new stadium built entirely with public funding. In 2018, Las Vegas was also previously considered as a relocation site for the Arizona Diamondbacks with the team signing a non-disclosure agreement with officials on a new retractable roof ballpark in the suburb of Henderson under the codename "Project Marble" only for the negotiations to stall and the team to focus on staying in the Phoenix metropolitan area.

=== Women's National Basketball Association ===
In October 2017, multiple national media outlets reported that Spurs Sports & Entertainment, owner of the San Antonio Spurs of the National Basketball Association (NBA) and its Women's National Basketball Association (WNBA) sister team, the San Antonio Stars, had reached an agreement to sell the Stars to a Las Vegas-based group that would move the team to the area effective with the 2018 season. The NBA and WNBA officially approved the sale on October 17, 2017, and announced the Las Vegas Aces would play at the Mandalay Bay Events Center, now known as Michelob Ultra Arena, starting in the 2018 season.

During the 2022 season, the Aces defeated the Phoenix Mercury in round 1 and the Seattle Storm in the semifinals before defeating the Connecticut Sun in the 2022 WNBA Finals in 4 games to win the franchise's first championship and the first professional sports championship for Las Vegas. The Aces also won the 2023 WNBA Championship, becoming the first team to win back-to-back championships since 2001-2002. The Aces won the WNBA Championship again in 2025.

=== Professional Women's Hockey League ===
On May 13, 2026, the Professional Women's Hockey League (PWHL) announced that Las Vegas would receive the Vegas Vanguards.

== Proposed major league teams ==
=== National Basketball Association ===
The Utah Jazz of the National Basketball Association (NBA) played 11 home games at the Thomas & Mack Center during the 1983–84 NBA season.

Rumors surfaced in 2005 about the possible relocation of the Sacramento Kings to Las Vegas. In November 2006, California voters rejected a proposal to fund a new arena in Sacramento, considered to be a condition of the team remaining there. Another possible factor was that the owners of the Kings, the Maloof family, also owned the Palms Casino Resort in Las Vegas. Changes in the Kings owners' financial situation led to a decision to sell the club to a group planning to keep the team in Sacramento, which finalized the purchase of the Kings in May 2013.

The Milwaukee Bucks had also been mentioned as possible candidates for relocation to Las Vegas, as were the Seattle SuperSonics before their relocation to Oklahoma City.

Former UNLV and NBA player Jackie Robinson has been working to build the All Net Resort and Arena, a $1.4 billion privately funded complex encompassing an arena, hotel and shopping project near the SLS Las Vegas and Turnberry Towers that could attract an NBA franchise to Las Vegas. The arena itself would cost $670 million, being operated by Comcast-Spectacor (owners of another NBA stadium, Philadelphia's Xfinity Mobile Arena). Designed by the Cuningham Group, the arena was planned to open in 2017. The All Net Arena saw its groundbreaking ceremony on October 29, 2014, and Robinson entered into negotiations with Clark County expecting to begin construction by Fall 2015. However, the plan was placed on hold in 2016 due to financing problems.

Las Vegas hosted the 2007 NBA All-Star Game, the only time the event has been held in a non-NBA city. As part of the conditions the NBA set for holding the game in Las Vegas, sports books agreed not to take bets on the game. The NBA Summer League is currently held in Paradise, Nevada. The 2008 and 2012 United States men's Olympic basketball teams trained in Las Vegas, and played a game at the Thomas & Mack Center against the Dominican Republic. Recently, Las Vegas hosted part of the NBA Cup at T-Mobile Arena in 2023, 2024, and 2025.

In October 2016, during an interview with KNPR's State of Nevada, MGM Resorts International CEO Jim Murren said he was working on bringing an NBA team to Las Vegas, to play at the T-Mobile Arena, adding that it would most likely be through the relocation of an existing team rather than through expansion. By 2022, Las Vegas became one of the two most discussed markets with potential to be awarded an expansion franchise (along with Seattle) with Los Angeles Lakers player LeBron James expressing interest in owning an expansion franchise in the Las Vegas Valley and NBA Commissioner Adam Silver expressing his support for the idea. Las Vegas mayor Carolyn Goodman also expressed her confidence in the city being the location of an NBA team.

In early 2024, NBA Commissioner Adam Silver stated that the NBA was seriously considering Las Vegas for an expansion team. Meanwhile, Oak View Group has plans a 20,000-seat arena on a 25-acre (10 ha) site adjacent to the Brightline West Las Vegas station. This project is part of a larger 66-acre (27 ha) development envisioned as a sports and entertainment district. According to Tim Leiweke, CEO of Oak View Group, it would be a prime location for future growth in Las Vegas' gaming and entertainment corridor.

In March 2026, it was reported that Magic Johnson and the MAGI group met with Nevada Governor Joe Lombardo to discuss an expansion team in the city, including a possible new arena and resort to house the team. Later that month, a meeting by the NBA Board of Governors was held to explore the possibility of a franchise in Las Vegas that would begin play in the 2028–29 season and was approved alongside a similar bid for Seattle.

In June 2026, it was reported that Bill Foley is now bid to acquire an NBA franchise for Las Vegas basketball team. The following month, it has confirmed that Bill Laurie and his wife Nancy Walton Laurie are bid to acquire an NBA franchise in Las Vegas. The team will most likely share T-Mobile Arena with the Golden Knights, but its name is yet to be determined.

=== Major League Soccer ===
The local media reported in the summer of 2008 that Las Vegas was on the short list of cities Major League Soccer (MLS) was considering for an expansion franchise in the near future. After a controversial campaign by Mayor Carolyn Goodman and Cordish Company to use public dollars for a new taxpayer-funded stadium, the proposal faced public backlash before MLS ultimately decided to pass on Las Vegas in February 2015.

Wes Edens, cofounder of Fortress Investment Group, had originally expressed interest in having a Major League Soccer team based in Las Vegas as an expansion along with a soccer-specific stadium adjacent to the Brightline West Las Vegas station. The stadium could have a capacity of at least 25,000 spectators and have the potential team name of the Las Vegas Villains.

In 2026, reports emerged that a group in Las Vegas was interested in relocating MLS's Vancouver Whitecaps FC following the team's difficulty in securing a stadium in the Vancouver area, which was met with fan backlash across the league.

== Minor league professional teams ==
=== Baseball ===
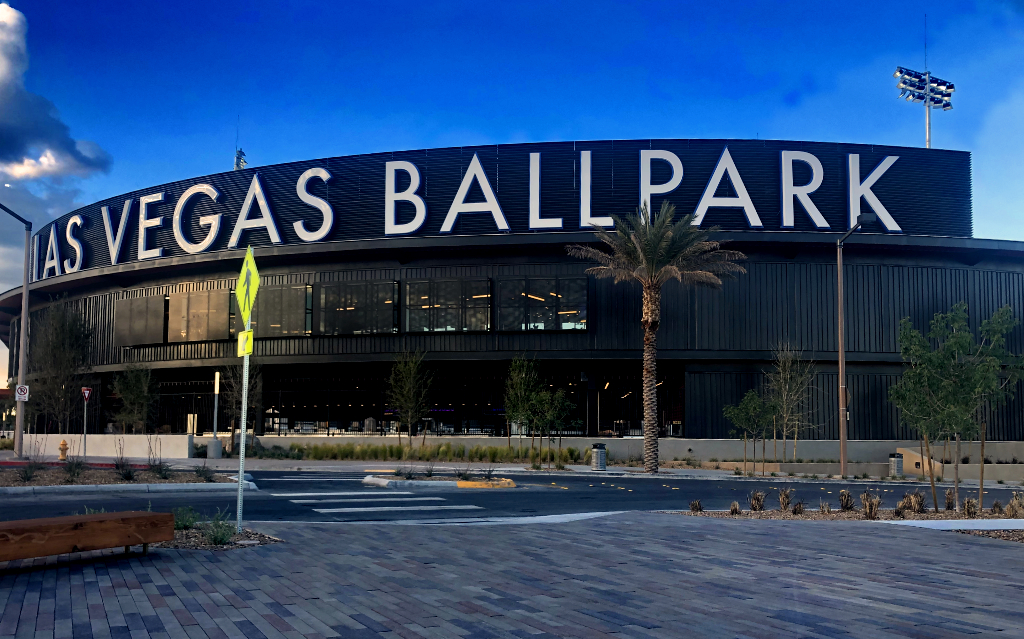
Las Vegas Ballpark, home of the Las Vegas Aviators

Las Vegas is home to the Las Vegas Aviators of the Pacific Coast League (AAA), who play at Las Vegas Ballpark. The park is in a part of Summerlin that lies outside the Las Vegas city limits. Established in 1983, the team had previously played as the Las Vegas Stars from 1983 until 2000 and later the Las Vegas 51s from 2001 until 2018 at Cashman Field until the opening of their new ballpark in 2019. The Aviators are currently the AAA affiliate of the Athletics.

When the team came to Las Vegas in 1983 they became the first professional sports team to play in Las Vegas since the Las Vegas Wranglers baseball club who played from 1947 to 1952 and 1957 to 1958.

=== Soccer ===
Beginning in 2018, Las Vegas became home to a USL Championship soccer team known as the Las Vegas Lights FC. The team plays at Cashman Field, and in its first season became the second team to play within the Las Vegas city limits. Following the 51s' rebranding as the Aviators and move to the new ballpark, Lights FC were the only professional team that plays within the city limits until the arrival of the XFL (2020) Vegas Vipers beginning in 2023, who used to share the stadium with the Lights before disbanding.

Back in 2012, Las Vegas was awarded a MASL soccer team called The Las Vegas Legends who began playing in the Orleans Arena & the Las Vegas Sports Park until 2016. In 2019, the Legends returned this time as a member of the NPSL in 2020 and won the Southwest Division in 2021. The Legends are now in the NISA Nation and currently play at Peter Johann Memorial Field.

=== Hockey ===
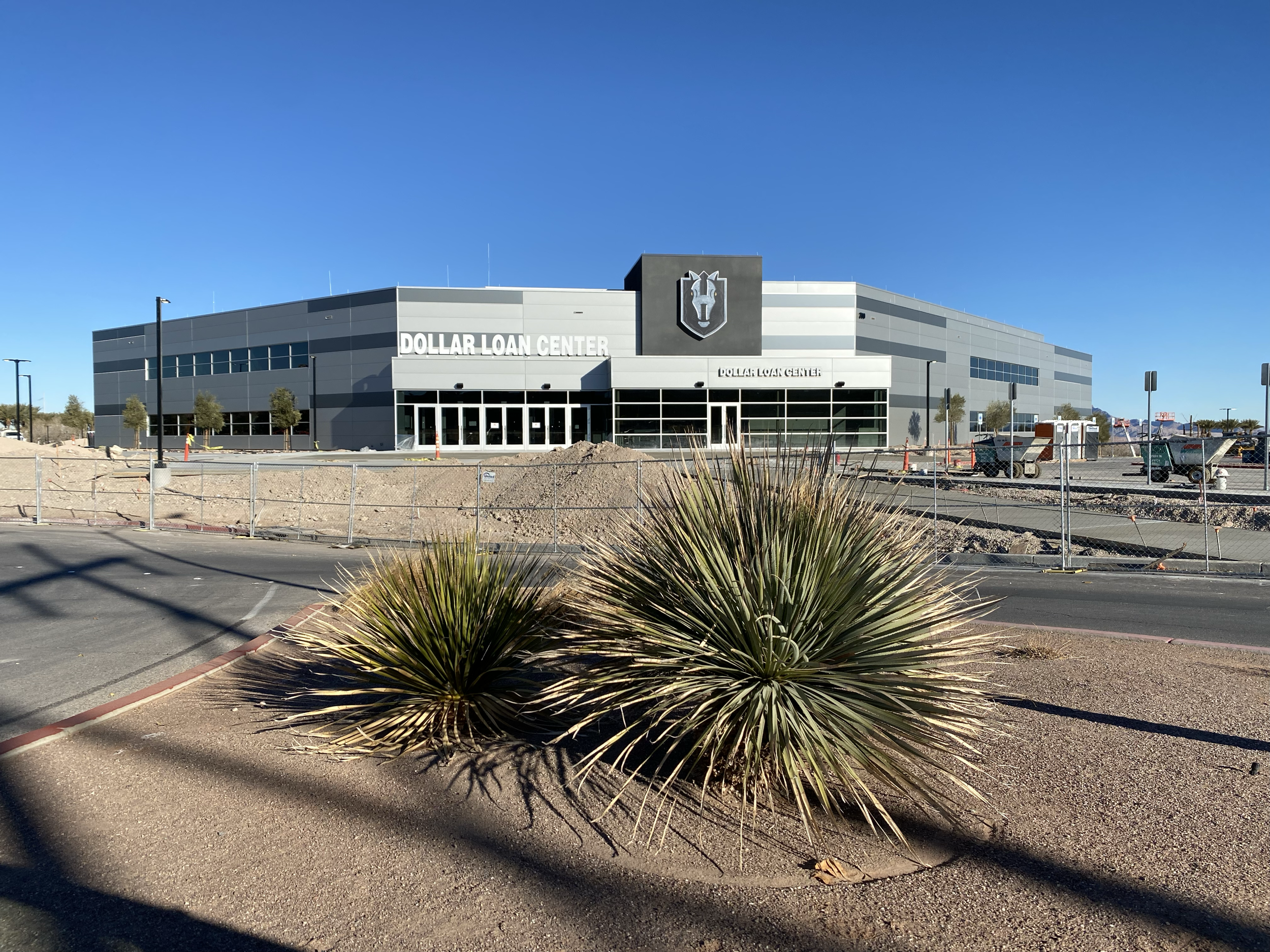
Lee's Family Forum, home of the Henderson Silver Knights and Vegas Knight Hawks

In 2020, the Las Vegas area became home of an American Hockey League franchise when the San Antonio Rampage relocated to the market as the Henderson Silver Knights. The team which is minor league affiliate of the Golden Knights played in Orleans Arena until the venue now known as Lee's Family Forum was constructed in Henderson.

Previously the Las Vegas area had minor hockey teams in the Las Vegas Thunder of the International Hockey League and later Las Vegas Wranglers of the ECHL.

=== Arena Football ===
In 2022, the Vegas Knight Hawks of the Indoor Football League began play at Lee's Family Forum (then known as Dollar Loan Center). The Knight Hawks are owned by Vegas Golden Knights owner Bill Foley.

Previously, Las Vegas was home to the Las Vegas Sting, Las Vegas Gladiators, and Las Vegas Outlaws, all from the also defunct Arena Football League.

=== Lacrosse ===
In 2021, the National Lacrosse League expanded to Henderson and are called The Las Vegas Desert Dogs. They play in the Lee's Family Forum & 2 of their owners are Steve Nash & Wayne Gretzky.

=== Volleyball ===
In 2024, the Vegas Thrill of the Pro Volleyball Federation made their inaugural season debut. The Thrill are one of 7 teams in the PVF to have kicked off the league's first ever season.

=== Esports ===
In 2022, Las Vegas got an Esports team who were relocating from Paris called the Vegas Falcons (formerly known as the Vegas Legion) who are a part of the Call of Duty League. In 2023, the Vegas Eternal, an Esports team for the video game league Overwatch League, also relocated to Las Vegas from Paris. Las Vegas also got another Esports team back in 2020 called the Vegas Inferno. They compete in leagues like the Valorant Champions Tour & Apex Legends Global Series.

=== Minor league sports issues ===
Cashman Field, the former home of the team now known as the Aviators, was built in 1983, and saw few upgrades during its time as a minor league ballpark. After the toilets backed up during a 2015 game, PCL president Branch Barrett Rickey wrote a letter to the Las Vegas Convention and Visitors Authority to warn that the upgrades needed to keep Cashman at something approaching Triple-A standards would require spending "tens of millions of dollars." Rickey added that even that wouldn't be enough, as many experts inside and outside Las Vegas believed that Cashman was at the end of its useful life.

Because it lagged so far behind most other facilities in AAA baseball there was danger that Las Vegas would lose its place in minor league baseball's top tier (which happened to Portland after the 2010 season when plans for a new park fell through). Dissatisfaction with the facilities, along with the lack of a plan to improve the situation, was cited as a major reason that the Los Angeles Dodgers did not renew their working agreement with the then-Las Vegas 51s after it expired in 2008. The Dodgers resumed what had been a long-term affiliation with Albuquerque, where a new ballpark opened in 2003. The now-Aviators opened Las Vegas Ballpark in Summerlin in 2019, which is considered a top facility in Minor League Baseball.

In 1999, UNLV officials refused to discuss a new agreement with the owners of the Las Vegas Thunder of the International Hockey League to play at the Thomas & Mack Center. Hotels with facilities suitable for the Thunder would not commit to an entire hockey season, as this would have seriously restricted the dates available for concerts and other events. This left the Thunder without a place to play. The team was disbanded, and the city lost hockey for four years. Only the opening of the Orleans Arena (considerably smaller than the Thomas & Mack) at the off-Strip Orleans Hotel allowed for the return of hockey with the Las Vegas Wranglers of the ECHL. The ECHL is considered two steps below the NHL, or the equivalent of the 'AA' level in minor league baseball. The Wranglers ceased operations after the 2013–14 season after Orleans Hotel owners Boyd Gaming informed the team that their lease at the Orleans Arena would not be renewed, and efforts to find a new location failed.

The Las Vegas Locomotives began play in October 2009 in the inaugural season of the United Football League. The Locos played in the first three UFL championship games, winning the first two against the Florida Tuskers, while losing the 2011 edition to the relocated Tuskers, then the Virginia Destroyers. The head coach was Jim Fassel, former head coach of the NFL's New York Giants. The team played home games at UNLV's Sam Boyd Stadium. The league suspended operations in the middle of the 2012 season, with Las Vegas undefeated through the first four games. Las Vegas, despite being the league's best and most consistent team on the field, was also consistently one of the poorest draws at the gate in the league; their final home game drew only 600 fans into the stadium, a league record low.

AF2, a second-tier arena football league, announced on June 24 that the ArenaCup, the league championship game, would be played in Las Vegas at the Orleans arena on August 22, 2009. AF2 President Jerry Kurz stated that the league had serious plans to put a team in Las Vegas to play at the Orleans Arena. He said that he had "no qualms" about this even given the problems that the Las Vegas Gladiators of the Arena Football League had in the city. This turned out to be the last season of AF2 due to the demise of its parent league, the original Arena Football League.

In 2005–06, the city hosted ArenaBowl XIX and ArenaBowl XX at the Thomas & Mack Center, the AFL's first neutral-site title games. After two years of disappointing attendance the game was moved.

== Former professional teams ==
Team/Club	League	Venue	Founded	Final	Titles
Las Vegas Americans	Major Indoor Soccer League	Thomas & Mack Center	1984	1985	
Las Vegas Bandits	International Basketball League	Thomas & Mack Center	2000	2001	
Las Vegas Blackjacks	SCRFU	Charlie Frias Park	1976	2011	1 (2010)
Las Vegas Cowboys	Continental Football League	Cashman Field	1968	1969	
Las Vegas Coyotes	Roller Hockey International	Santa Fe Hotel & Casino Ice Arena	1999	1999	
Las Vegas Dustdevils	Continental Indoor Soccer League	MGM Grand Garden Arena; Thomas & Mack Center	1994	1995	1 (1994)
Las Vegas Flash	Roller Hockey International	Thomas & Mack Center	1994	1994	
Las Vegas Gladiators	Arena Football League	Thomas & Mack Center; Orleans Arena	2003	2007	
Las Vegas Knights	Premier Arena Soccer League	Las Vegas Sports Park	2006	2014	3
Las Vegas Legends	Major Arena Soccer League	Orleans Arena	2012	2016	
Las Vegas Locomotives	United Football League	Sam Boyd Stadium	2009	2012	2
Las Vegas Outlaws	XFL	Sam Boyd Stadium	2001	2001	
Las Vegas Outlaws	Arena Football League	Thomas & Mack Center	2015	2015	
Las Vegas Posse	Canadian Football League	Sam Boyd Stadium	1994	1994	
Las Vegas Quicksilvers	North American Soccer League	Sam Boyd Stadium	1977	1977	
Las Vegas PROLYMs	American Basketball Association		2006	2007	
Las Vegas Rattlers	American Basketball Association	All American Sportspark	2004	2005	
Las Vegas Showgirlz	Women's Football Alliance	Faith Lutheran Jr/Sr High School	2006	2017	
Las Vegas Silvers	Continental Basketball Association		1982	1983	
Las Vegas Silver Bandits	International Basketball League	Thomas & Mack Center	1999	2000	
Las Vegas Slam	American Basketball Association	Thomas & Mack Center	2001	2002	
Las Vegas Stallions FC	National Premier Soccer League	Piggott Memorial Stadium	2013		
Las Vegas Stars	International Basketball League	Stations Sports Complex	2007	2008	
Las Vegas Strikers	NPSL	Bettye Wilson Soccer Complex	2003	2008	
Las Vegas Sting	Arena Football League	MGM Grand Garden Arena; Thomas & Mack Center	1994	1995	
Las Vegas Tabagators	WPSL	Bettye Wilson Soccer Complex	2005	2006	
Las Vegas Thunder	International Hockey League	Thomas & Mack Center	1993	1999	
Las Vegas Venom	American Basketball Association		2006	2006	
Las Vegas Wranglers	various	Cashman Field	1947	1952	1 (1949)
Las Vegas Wranglers	various	Cashman Field	1957	1958	
Las Vegas Wranglers	ECHL	Orleans Arena	2003	2014	
Silver State Legacy	Women's Football Alliance	Legacy High School	2010	2017	
Vegas Ballers	TBL	Tarkanian Basketball Center	2020	2021	
Vegas Rollers	WTT	Orleans Arena	2019	2019	
Vegas Vipers	XFL	Cashman Field	2023	2023	

== College sports ==
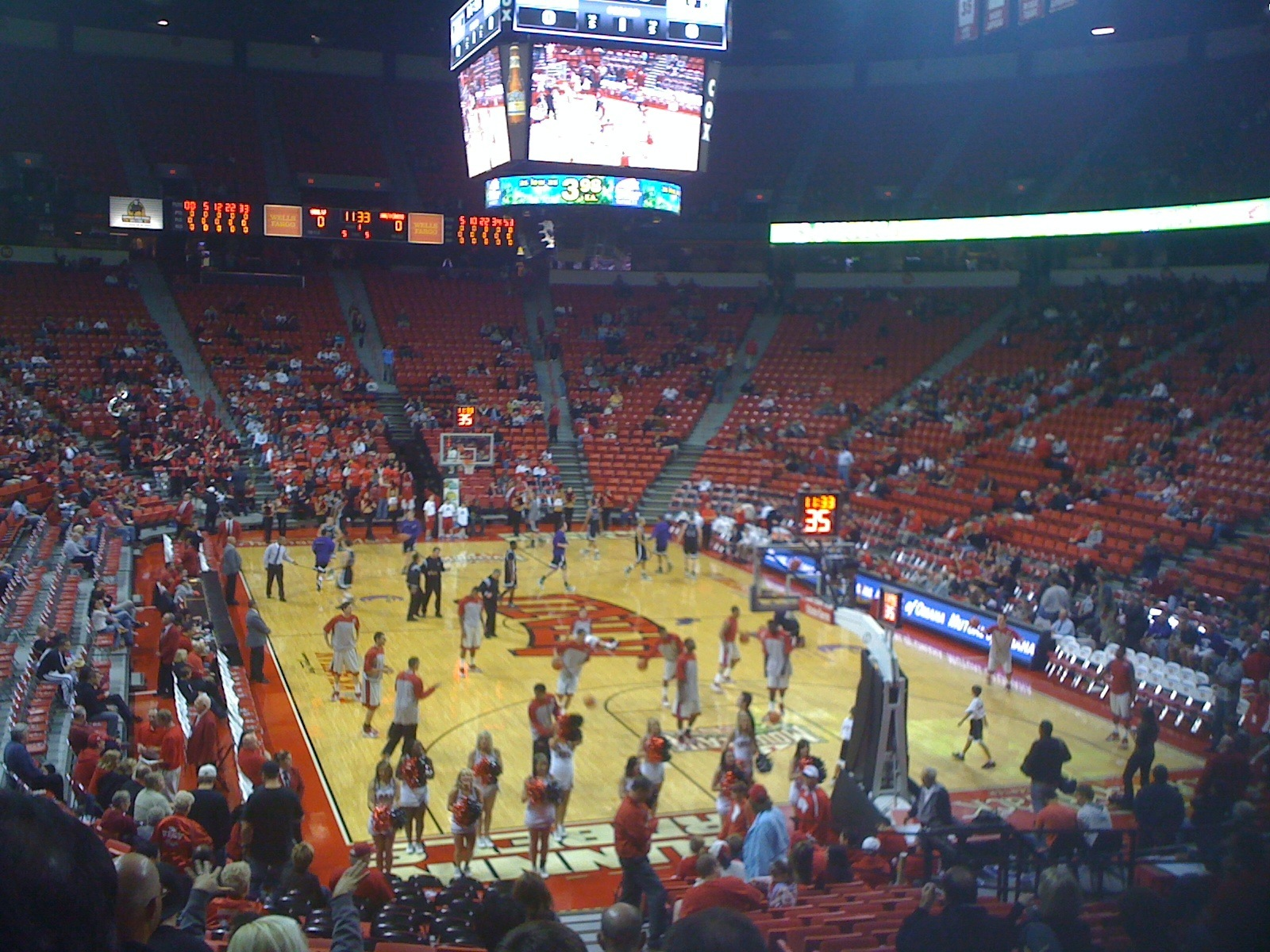
UNLV Basketball at the Thomas and Mack Center

The University of Nevada, Las Vegas (UNLV) Rebels (the name Runnin' Rebels is used only by the men's basketball team) host Mountain West Conference events on the UNLV campus and at Allegiant Stadium. Indoor sporting events are held at the Thomas & Mack Center complex, both at the main arena and at Cox Pavilion, a smaller arena attached to the complex.

The College of Southern Nevada (CSN) Coyotes host Scenic West Athletic Conference events on the CSN campus at William R. Morse Stadium and at Heritage Park both in Henderson.

The city has become a regional hub for college basketball conference tournaments. The Mountain West Conference (MW) holds its annual tournaments for both men and women at the Thomas & Mack Center. Las Vegas hosted the tournaments for the first seven years of the MW's existence, with the tournaments returning to Las Vegas in 2009 after three years in Denver. The MW deepened its ties to the Las Vegas Valley in July 2026 by moving its headquarters from Colorado Springs, Colorado to Town Square south of the Las Vegas Strip. In 2009 the West Coast Conference, which does not have a team in Nevada, moved its men's and women's tournaments to the Orleans Arena. The Western Athletic Conference moved both of its tournaments to Las Vegas in 2011. The WAC also played at Orleans Arena through the 2025–26 season, after which it lost most of its previous members, added new members mainly in southeastern states, and rebranded as the United Athletic Conference, which now holds its tournaments in the Dallas–Fort Worth metroplex.

On March 14, 2012, the Las Vegas Review-Journal reported that the Pac-12 Conference was moving its men's basketball conference tournament to Las Vegas in 2013, to be played at the MGM Grand Garden Arena. The tournament remained at this venue through the 2016 edition, after which it moved to T-Mobile Arena. The Pac-12 later moved its women's tournament from Seattle to Las Vegas, originally at MGM Grand Garden Arena and later at Michelob Ultra Arena. Both tournaments continued to be held on the Strip until the conference's 2024 collapse. More recently, the Big West Conference moved its men's and women's tournaments to the area starting in 2020–21, first at Michelob Ultra Arena in 2021 and then Dollar Loan Center/Lee's Family Forum from 2022. The Pac-12 resumed full operation in July 2026 with the arrival of seven new members, and it soon announced its men's and women's tournaments would be held at MGM Grand Garden Arena starting in the 2026–27 season.

Las Vegas hosts the Las Vegas Bowl, a college bowl game, around Christmas Day. Before the Pac-12 collapsed, the game paired a team from that conference against either a SEC team or Big Ten team.

Despite the state of Nevada having no collegiate wrestling itself, many of the most prestigious college wrestling events are held in the area each year. The Cliff Keen Las Vegas Invitational tournament has been held in the city since 1981. Some of the nation's best wrestling teams, such as Michigan, Nebraska, Virginia Tech, Minnesota, Iowa State, Ohio State and Northern Iowa often attend the event. Nearby Reno, also holds a huge wrestling tournament every year for both collegiate and high school wrestling known as The Reno Tournament of Champions.

Vegas has also been home to many international amateur wrestling events. In 2015, Vegas held the World Wrestling Championships at Orleans Arena.

== Rugby union and variations ==
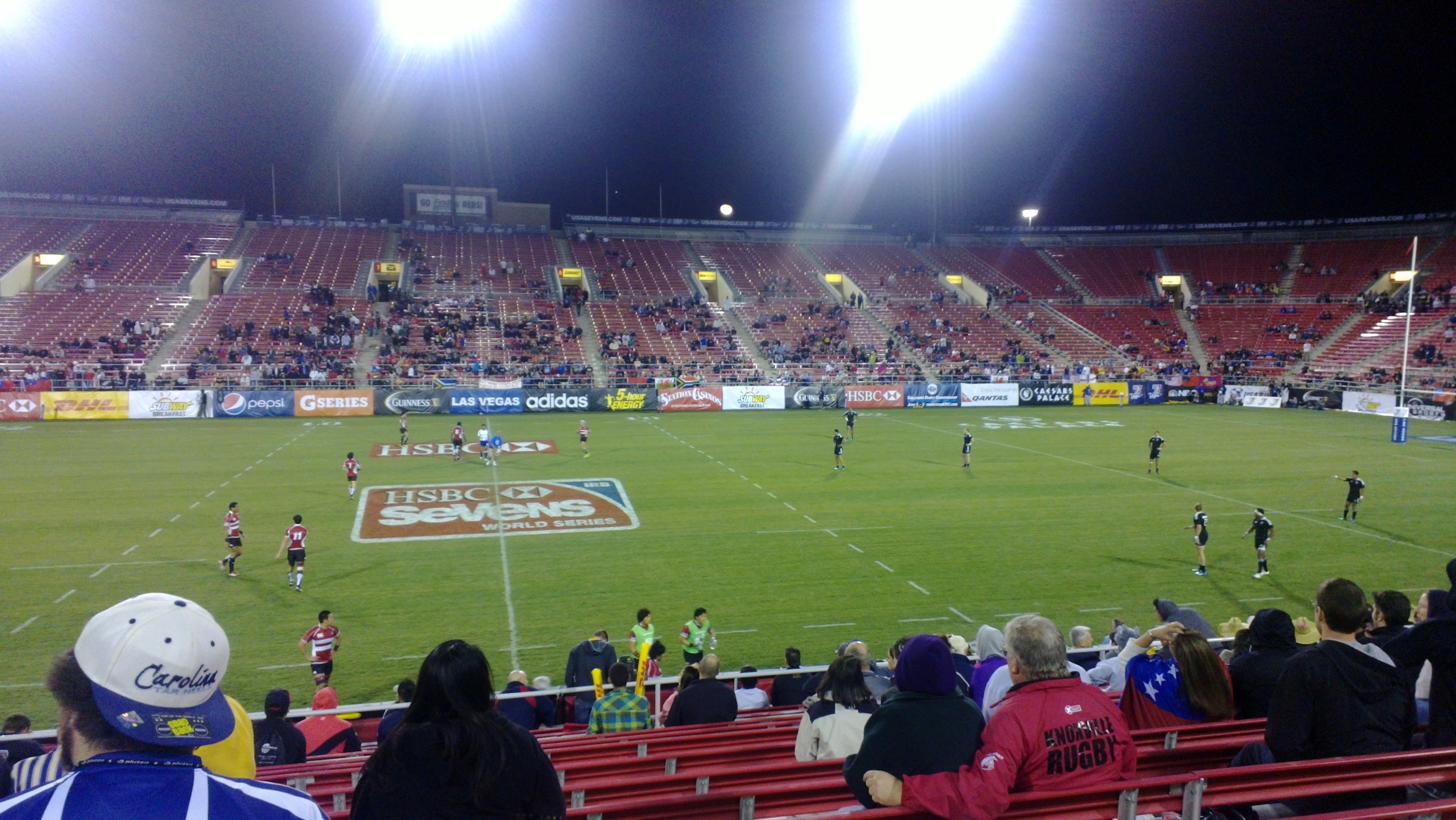
US Sevens 2012

The Las Vegas Blackjacks RFC are a rugby union team that compete in the Southern California Rugby Football Union.

The USA Sevens, the largest annual rugby tournament in North America, was in Sam Boyd Stadium from 2010 until 2018. The tournament had been held in late January or early February until 2016, when it moved to its current date of the first full weekend in March. The USA Sevens, one of the events in the annual World Rugby Sevens Series rugby sevens circuit, moved to Las Vegas from San Diego, where it had previously been held. The 2012 USA Sevens drew over 64,000 fans to the stadium and was broadcast live on NBC. The Sevens World Series is an annual series of tournaments for national sevens teams, with most events featuring 16 teams competing for two distinct trophies.

The 2017 edition saw the addition of the USA Women's Sevens to the tournament weekend, also at Sam Boyd Stadium. The USA Women's Sevens has been part of the World Rugby Women's Sevens Series since the circuit's creation in 2012–13; its first edition had been held in Houston before moving to suburban Atlanta for its next three editions. However, 2017 was the only year in which Las Vegas hosted a women's tournament. The USA Women's Sevens was not held in the 2017–18 season, being superseded by the 2018 Rugby World Cup Sevens in San Francisco. While that event resumed in the 2018–19 season, it was moved to Denver.

In February 2020, five Major League Rugby games were held at Sam Boyd Stadium.

== Special sports events ==
The NASCAR Cup Series has drawn up to 165,000 fans. Las Vegas also hosts a significant number of professional fights. Many of these fights (such as those in MMA's UFC) take place near downtown or on the Strip in one of the major resort/hotel/casino event centers. The T-Mobile Arena is frequently a top contender as a venue for the UFC.

Las Vegas submitted a bid to host the 2020 Summer Olympics, but did so without United States Olympic Committee (USOC) consent. The International Olympic Committee (IOC) requires that a national Olympic committee nominates a city within their country followed by the submission of the bid to the IOC. The USOC stated that they would not submit a 2020 bid. Las Vegas proceeded without USOC support. The IOC reportedly rejected the bid. The day after the September 1, 2011 deadline for bidding, the IOC revealed the six applicant cities and Las Vegas was not one of them.

== Individual sports ==
=== Boxing ===
Las Vegas is known as the home of big time boxing and has hosted many professional boxing matches and championship bouts, including the following notable bouts:

- Larry Holmes vs. Muhammad Ali (1980)
- The Battle of the Little Giants (1981)
- Sugar Ray Leonard vs. Thomas Hearns (1981)
- Larry Holmes vs. Gerry Cooney (1982)
- Marvin Hagler vs. Thomas Hearns (1985)
- Sugar Ray Leonard vs. Thomas Hearns II (1989)
- Julio César Chávez vs. Meldrick Taylor (1990)
- Julio César Chávez vs. Héctor Camacho (1992)
- Michael Carbajal vs. Humberto González (1993)
- Julio César Chávez vs. Oscar De La Hoya (1996)
- Evander Holyfield vs. Mike Tyson II (1997)
- Oscar De La Hoya vs. Julio Cesar Chavez II (1998)
- Oscar De La Hoya vs. Félix Trinidad (1999)
- Lennox Lewis vs. Evander Holyfield II (1999)
- Barrera vs. Morales trilogy (2000, 2002, 2004)
- Oscar De La Hoya vs. Floyd Mayweather Jr. (2007)
- Floyd Mayweather Jr. vs. Ricky Hatton (2007)
- Bernard Hopkins vs. Joe Calzaghe (2008)
- Ricky Hatton vs. Manny Pacquiao (2009)
- Floyd Mayweather Jr. vs. Miguel Cotto (2012)
- Floyd Mayweather Jr. vs. Canelo Álvarez (2013)
- Floyd Mayweather Jr. vs. Manny Pacquiao (2015)
- Floyd Mayweather Jr. vs. Conor McGregor (2017)
- Canelo Álvarez vs. Gennady Golovkin (2017)
- Canelo Álvarez vs. Gennady Golovkin II (2018)
- Deontay Wilder vs. Tyson Fury II (2020)
- Tyson Fury vs. Deontay Wilder III (2021)
- Canelo Álvarez vs. Caleb Plant (2021)
- Canelo Álvarez vs. Gennady Golovkin III (2022)
- Gervonta Davis vs. Ryan Garcia (2023)
- Errol Spence Jr. vs. Terence Crawford (2023)
- Canelo Álvarez vs. Terence Crawford (2025)

=== Golf ===
Las Vegas hosts two pro tour events:

- PGA Tour Shriners Hospitals for Children Open (historically known as the Las Vegas Invitational)
- PGA Tour Champions Las Vegas Open

The Las Vegas Country Club previously hosted the LPGA Takefuji Classic from 2003 until 2006.

=== Mixed martial arts ===
Along with significant rises in popularity in mixed martial arts (MMA), a number of fight leagues such as the premier MMA organization in the world the UFC call Las Vegas home with the headquarters of world operations due to the number of suitable host venues with an annual international fight week held near July 4. The Mandalay Bay Events Center and MGM Grand Garden Arena were among some of the more popular venues for fighting events and have hosted several UFC and other MMA title fights. With the addition of the new T-Mobile Arena all UFC PPV events in Las Vegas are exclusively held there. On September 14, 2024, The Sphere held a UFC PPV. Las Vegas has held the following notable bouts:

- UFC 52: Couture vs. Liddell (2005)
- UFC 66: Liddell vs. Ortiz (2006)
- UFC 91: Couture vs. Lesnar (2008)
- UFC 100: Lesnar vs. Mir 2 (2009)
- UFC 116: Lesnar vs. Carwin (2010)
- UFC 141: Lesnar vs. Overeem (2011)
- UFC 162: Silva vs. Weidman (2013)
- UFC 167: St-Pierre vs. Hendricks (2013)
- UFC 182: Jones vs. Cormier (2015)
- UFC 189: McGregor vs. Mendes (2015)
- UFC 194: Aldo vs. McGregor (2015)
- UFC 196: McGregor vs. Diaz (2016)
- UFC 200: Tate vs. Nunes (2016)
- UFC 202: Diaz vs. McGregor 2 (2016)
- UFC 226: Miocic vs. Cormier (2018)
- UFC 229: Khabib vs. McGregor (2018)
- UFC 245: Usman vs. Covington (2019)
- UFC 246: McGregor vs. Cowboy (2020)
- UFC 264: Poirier vs. McGregor 3 (2021)
- UFC 285: Jones vs. Gane (2023)
- UFC 300: Pereira vs. Hill (2024)
- UFC 306: O'Malley vs. Dvalishvili (2024)
- UFC 317: Topuria vs. Oliviera (2025)
- UFC 329: McGregor vs. Holloway 2 (2026)

=== Motorsports ===
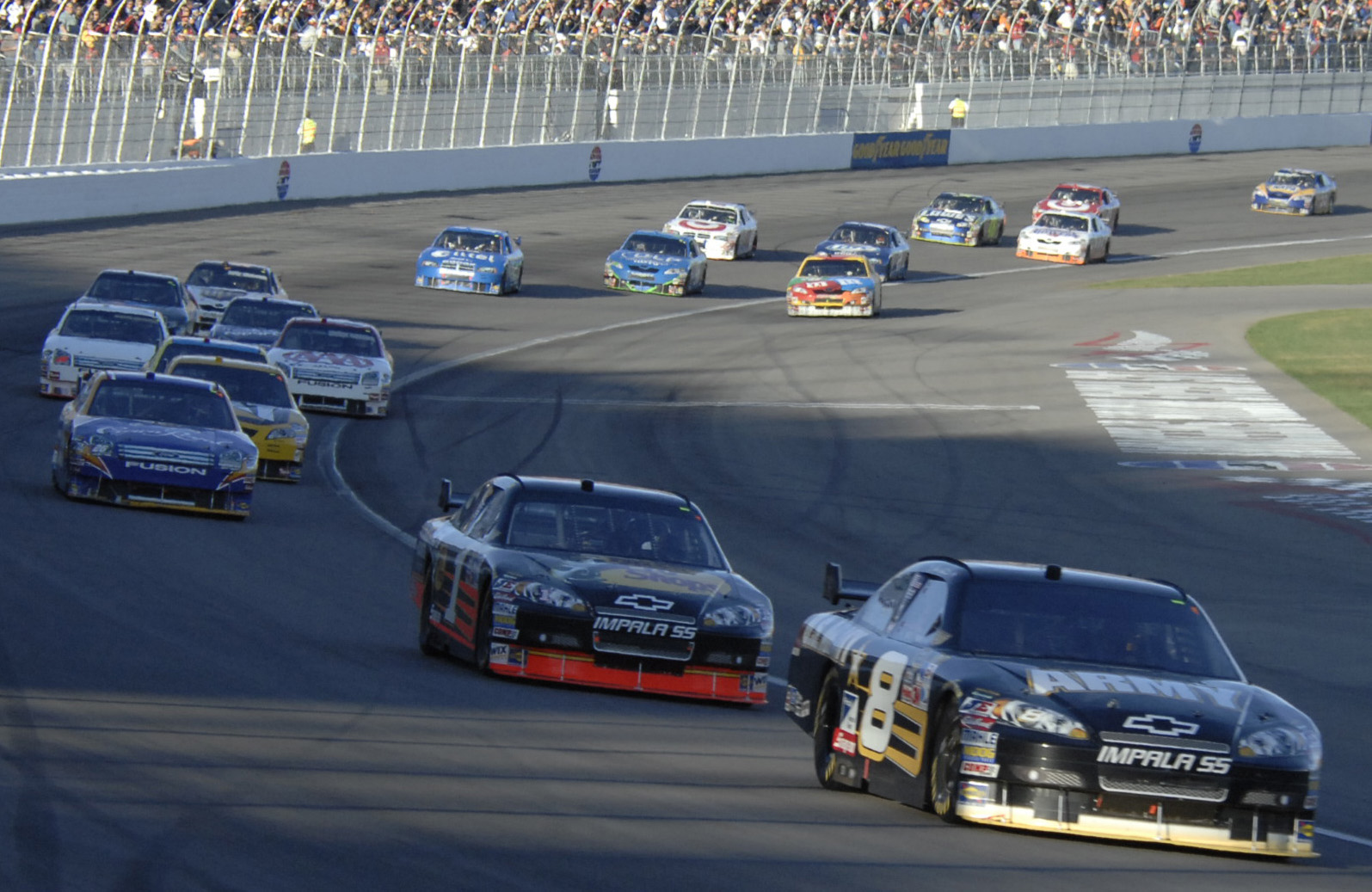
NASCAR racing at Las Vegas Motor Speedway

Las Vegas has become an internationally known motor racing locale, having hosted the elite Formula One racers at Caesars Palace and the Championship Auto Racing Teams (CART) for Indy car racers in the early 1980s. Las Vegas is also home to the Mint 400, an off-road race run in the unforgiving Nevada desert outside Las Vegas. During the race's "classic era" from 1967 to 1987, as many as 100,000 spectators lined the 100-mile (160 km) loop to view the 500-plus off-road racing vehicles. Sponsored by Del Webb's Mint Hotel and Casino, the event was the largest and richest event in the sport. The technical and safety inspection was held on famed Fremont Street and became one of the major must-attend sporting events in Las Vegas history. After the 1987 race, the Del Webb organization sold the Mint Hotel to the adjacent Horseshoe owned by the legendary Binion gaming family, and the race was discontinued after the 1989 edition. In 2008, the Mint 400 was revived under new management, and since 2012 it has been held on a completely new 100-mile desert loop.

The Caesars Palace Grand Prix was held on the grounds of Caesars Palace from 1981 to 1984. It was a Formula One race for its first two years, and CART race for its final two years.

The Can-Am Challenge Cup races in 1966–68 were held at the old Stardust Raceway and were officially called the Stardust Grand Prix.

In July 2006, the Las Vegas City Council approved a 2.44-mile, 14-turn, counterclockwise street circuit in the downtown area for a Champ Car event slated for April 6–8, 2007.

Las Vegas hosts these motor sports at the Las Vegas Motor Speedway:

- NASCAR Cup Series Pennzoil 400, South Point 400
- NASCAR O'Reilly Auto Parts Series The LiUNA!, Focused Health 302
- Denso Spark Plugs NHRA Nationals (April)
- NHRA Toyota Nationals (November)
- Monster Jam World Finals at Sam Boyd Stadium (March)

The Las Vegas Grand Prix has been held at the Las Vegas Strip Circuit since 2023. The inaugural race was held on November 18, 2023.

=== Professional wrestling ===
Over the years, Las Vegas has housed many wrestling events for WWE such as WrestleMania IX at Caesars Palace, No Way Out (2001), Vengeance (2005), Monday Night Raw, and No Way Out (2008) housed at the Thomas and Mack Center. Both Money in the Bank (2016) and Elimination Chamber (2018) took place at T-Mobile Arena. In recent years SummerSlam (2021) was held at the Allegiant Stadium and Money in the Bank (2022) was held at the MGM Grand Garden Arena.

WrestleMania 41 was held in Las Vegas on April 19 and 20, 2025 at the Allegiant Stadium. WrestleMania 42 was held on April 18 and 19, 2026 at the Allegiant Stadium.

Las Vegas also hosted World Championship Wrestling's Halloween Havoc from 1996 to 2000 and TNA Wrestling's TNA Impact! along with numerous Ring of Honor Pay Per View and televised events including the 13th and 14th Anniversary Shows, along with Death Before Dishonor XIV and Death Before Dishonor XV.

AEW's inaugural Double or Nothing pay-per-view was held at the MGM Grand Garden Arena in 2019 and 2024. The event took place at the T-Mobile Arena on 2022 and 2023.

=== Rodeo ===
The Professional Rodeo Cowboys Association's National Finals Rodeo at the Thomas & Mack Center has drawn thousands of fans to the city every December since 1985. A contract extension was signed in 2005 keeping the event in Las Vegas through 2014, followed by another extension that will keep the event in Las Vegas through 2025.

The Professional Bull Riders circuit held its annual World Finals in Las Vegas for many years. From 1994 to 1998, the event was held at the MGM Grand Garden Arena; from 1999 to 2015, it was held at the Thomas & Mack Center; from 2016 to 2019, and again in 2021, it was held at T-Mobile Arena.

Las Vegas has hosted several individual professional rodeo events:

- Professional Rodeo Cowboys Association (PRCA) National Finals Rodeo [1985–2019, 2021–present]
- Las Vegas Days Rodeo (PRCA regular season rodeo)
- International Gay Rodeo Association (IGRA) BigHorn Rodeo [IGRA regular season rodeo]
- IGRA World Finals
- Professional Bull Riders (PBR) World Finals [1994–2019, 2021]
- PBR Last Cowboy Standing (PBR Premier Series regular season event) [2011, 2013–2018]
- Indian National Finals Rodeo

=== Running and triathlon ===
- Rock 'n' Roll Las Vegas Marathon — The marathon was originally organized by Al Boka in 1983, who eventually sold the marathon in 2005 to Devine Racing, a Chicago-based race organization company that is responsible for several other races, including the Los Angeles Marathon. Devine redubbed the race as "The New Las Vegas Marathon", and updated the course to include the Strip. Introduced on December 4, 2005, the new course marks one of the race occasions that the Strip is closed to traffic. Prior to that, the course had run on the old Los Angeles Highway, beginning in the community of Jean, Nevada, and ending inside Las Vegas proper (Sunset Park). Additionally in 2005, the date of the marathon was changed from January to December to help ensure better weather. In 2009, the Las Vegas Marathon was acquired by the Competitor Group, Inc. and renamed as the Rock 'n' Roll Las Vegas Marathon, as part of the company's Rock 'n' Roll Marathon Series.
- Revel Marathon Series stages the USATF certified Revel Mount Charleston Marathon, annually. The race starts on Mount Charleston, proceeds through Kyle Canyon and Spring Mountains National Recreation Area, and ends at the Thunderbird Family Sports Complex in the Centennial Hills, Las Vegas neighborhood.
- Baker to Vegas Challenge Cup Relay – Vegas is the end point for the annual Baker to Vegas Challenge Cup Relay. This 120 mile long foot race is run in April of each year by law enforcement teams from around the world. The race starts in Baker, California and is run over two days. This is the largest law enforcement athletic event in the world.
- The World Triathlon Corporation (WTC) had hosted the Ironman 70.3 World Championships in the Las Vegas metropolitan area from 2011 to 2013. The swim portion of the competition is held at Lake Las Vegas, and the bike and run portions are held in the Henderson, Nevada area. In 2014, the race was renamed the Ironman 70.3 Silverman as the championship race began the practice of changing to a new location each year going forward.
- The Lake Las Vegas/Henderson, Nevada area was host to the ITU Long Distance Triathlon World Championships on November 5, 2011, and organized by the International Triathlon Union. The venue featured the same course as the previously held Nevada Silverman Triathlon.

== Other events ==
- Las Vegas is home to the Tennis Channel Open hosted at Darling Tennis Center. An international series tournament with a $1,000,000 prize fund which attracts stars such as Lleyton Hewitt, James Blake and Las Vegas native Andre Agassi.
- In 2006, the city hosted the USAFL National Championships, the biggest event in the United States for the sport of Australian rules football, with over 2,000 players from the US and Canada including local team Las Vegas Gamblers.
- The annual Evolution Championship Series fighting game event – which holds the largest fighting game tournaments in the world – has been hosted in Las Vegas since its rebranding in 2002.
- Las Vegas is home to the professional paintball team Las Vegas LTZ and amateur team Sin City Paintball.
- Las Vegas is home of the American Ninja Warrior national finals since season 4, which resembles the Mt. Midoriyama course from its Japanese TV series Sasuke. Here, 90 competitors from around the country compete in this city to earn the title of American Ninja Warrior champion and the cash prize of $1,000,000.
- eSports organization Major League Gaming hosted an MLG gaming event in Las Vegas from 2006 to 2008, featuring competitive Halo, Call of Duty, and other gaming tournaments. Las Vegas will be hosting an MLG event called MLG Vegas from December 16-18th. 2016.
- Las Vegas was the host city for three major figure skating events, held at the Orleans Arena: 2019 Skate America, 2020 Skate America, and the 2021 U.S. Figure Skating Championships. The Orleans Arena was also the planned site for the 2021 U.S. Synchronized Skating Championships, which was canceled due to the COVID-19 pandemic.
- Since 2022, T-Mobile Arena in Las Vegas has been home of the Professional Bull Riders Team Series Championship.
- In indoor target archery, Las Vegas hosts two major events every February or March. The first is the final of the World Archery Indoor World Series. This coincides with The Vegas Shoot, organized by the National Field Archery Association, which is the discipline's most lucrative event. Most notably, the winner of the men's professional compound division receives a $100,000 prize.
- National Rugby League's Rugby League Las Vegas event is hosted at the Allegiant Stadium from its inception in 2024 until at least 2028.

== Sports venues ==
- City National Arena
- Cox Pavilion
- Dollar Loan Center
- Las Vegas Ice Center
- Lifeguard Arena
- MGM Grand Garden Arena
- Michelob Ultra Arena
- MSG Sphere
- Orleans Arena
- Sobe Ice Arena
- South Point Events Center
- Tarkanian Basketball Center
- Thomas & Mack Center
- T-Mobile Arena

=== Golf courses ===
- Primm Valley Golf Club
- Rio Secco Golf Club
- Shadow Creek Golf Club – Private
- TPC Las Vegas (formerly TPC at The Canyons)
- TPC at Summerlin – Private
- Wynn Golf and Country Club
- Rhodes Ranch Golf Club
- Chimera Golf Club
- Badlands
- The Club at Sunrise
- Las Vegas Golf Club

=== Motor sports ===
- Las Vegas Motor Speedway
- Las Vegas Strip Circuit

=== Sports fields ===
- Allegiant Stadium
- Bettye Wilson Soccer Complex
- Cashman Field
- New Las Vegas Stadium (2028)
- Sam Boyd Stadium
- Las Vegas Ballpark

== See also ==
- Las Vegas Desert Classic (darts)
- Fabulous Sin City Rollergirls (WFTDA) (roller derby)
- Sports in Nevada
