= Cashman Field =

Stadium in Las Vegas, Nevada

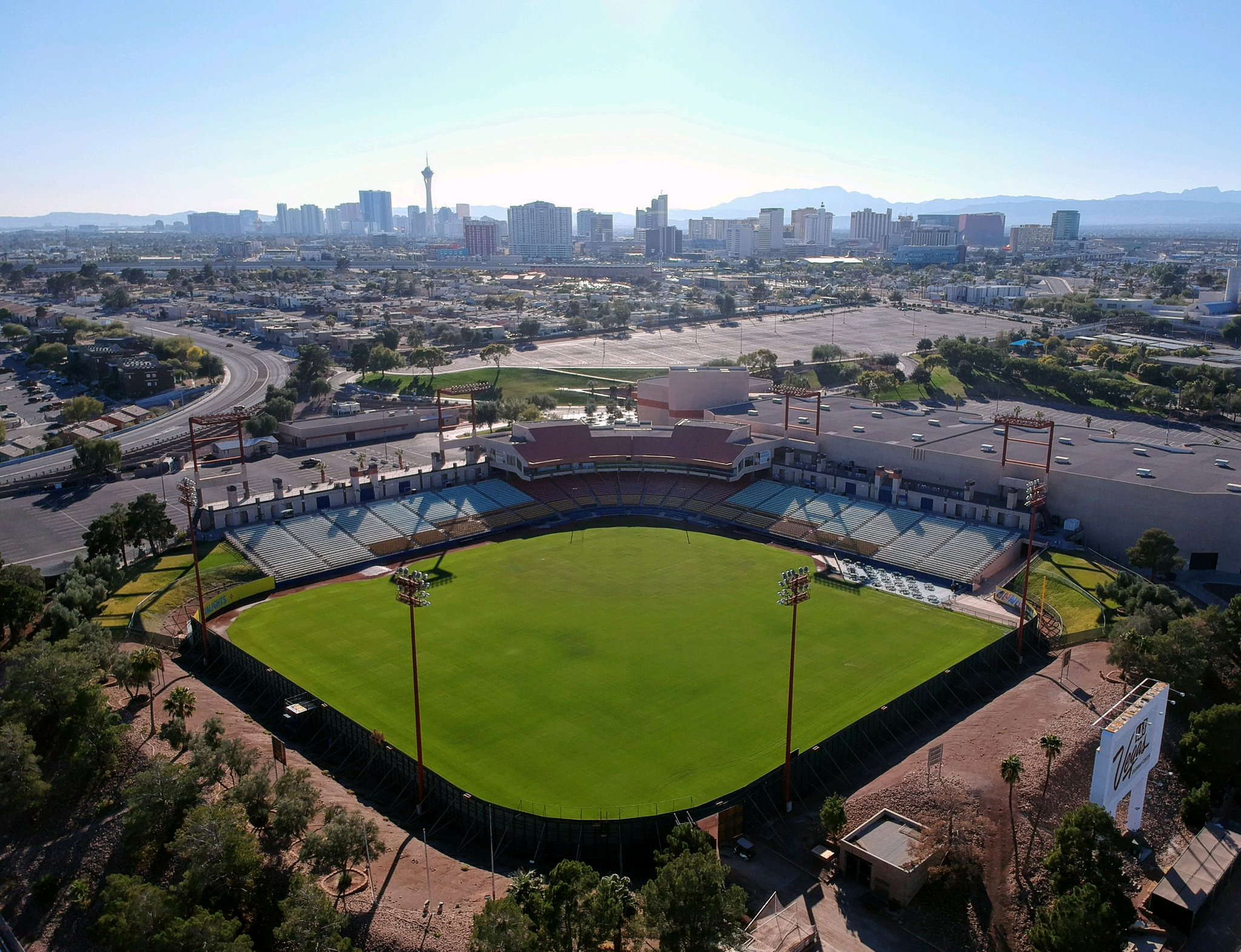
- Aerial view of Cashman Field

- Location in Nevada Location in the United States Location in North America
- Interactive map of Cashman Field
- Address: 850 North Las Vegas Boulevard; Las Vegas, Nevada; U.S.
- Coordinates: 36°10′46.8″N 115°07′47.9″W
- Owner: City of Las Vegas
- Operator: City of Las Vegas
- Capacity: 9,334 (fixed seating); 12,500 (plus standing room and berm)
- Surface: Grass
- Record attendance: 15,025 (April 3, 1993; Chicago White Sox vs. Chicago Cubs)
- Field size: 110 yd × 80 yd (101 m × 73 m)

Construction
- Groundbreaking: April 1981; 45 years ago
- Opened: April 1, 1983; 43 years ago
- Renovated: 2019
- Closed: October 17, 2026; 12 days ago
- Cost: US$26 million ($84 million in 2025 dollars)
- Architects: Tate & Snyder; R. Gary Allen Design Architects
- Structural engineers: John A. Martin & Associates
- General contractor: Mardian Construction Co.

Tenants
- Las Vegas Stars/51s (PCL) 1983–2018; Oakland Athletics (MLB) (six games, 1996); San Diego Legion (MLR) 2021; Las Vegas Lights FC (USLC) 2018–2026; Vegas Vipers (XFL) 2023

Cashman Field is a stadium in downtown Las Vegas, Nevada, United States. Originally built as a baseball stadium, it was the home of the Triple-A Las Vegas Stars/51s of Minor League Baseball from 1983 to 2018, and home to the Vegas Vipers of the XFL in 2023, as well as the Las Vegas Lights FC of the USL Championship. The stadium is connected to Cashman Center, an exhibit hall and theater operated by the City of Las Vegas. The complex, built on the site of a former stadium of the same name, is named for James "Big Jim" Cashman and his family, who have been Las Vegas entrepreneurs for several generations.

== Original Cashman Field ==
The original Cashman Field was built in 1947 on the same property as the modern stadium, with the grandstand on the hillside between the modern parking lots A and B and the field itself on the site of the modern parking lot B and the Cashman Theatre. The original stadium, called Elks Stadium, was used for football and rodeos before the first baseball game was held on May 21, 1948. The stadium was designed primarily for football, rodeo, concerts and boxing with one large grandstand. For baseball this meant all the seats were along first base line. The stadium was home to the Las Vegas Wranglers from 1947 to 1952 and again from 1957 to 1958. Boxing matches were also held at the facility. The first professional football game in Las Vegas was held at the stadium in 1964 when the American Football League then-Oakland Raiders played the then-Houston Oilers.

== Baseball beginnings ==
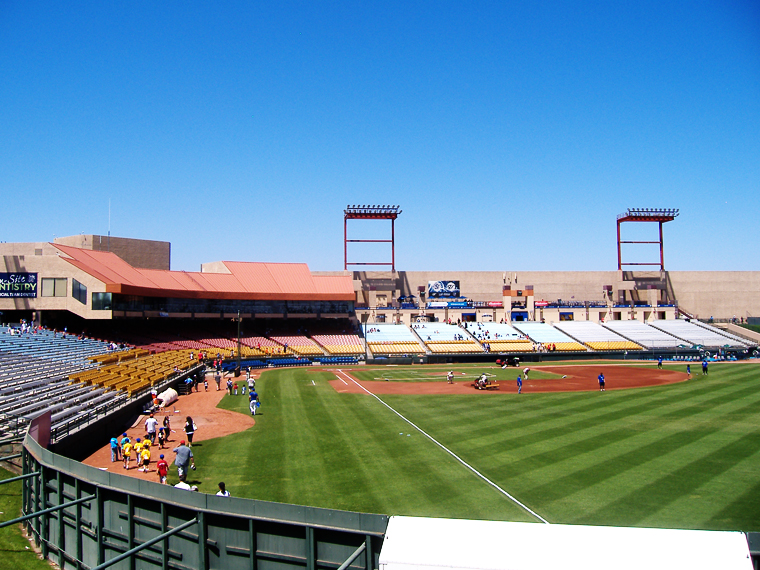
Former Cashman Field baseball configuration

The modern Cashman Field opened in 1983 as the home field of the new Las Vegas Stars, the relocated Spokane Indians of the Triple-A Pacific Coast League, who had moved to Las Vegas following the 1982 season. The symmetrical field boasted dimensions of 328 feet (100 m) down the left and right field foul lines, 433 feet (132 m) feet to center field, and 364 feet (111 m) feet to the power alleys in right-center and left-center fields. The ballpark opened with a maximum seating capacity of 9,334. Its first professional baseball game was a Major League Baseball (MLB) exhibition held on April 1, 1983, in which the San Diego Padres faced the Seattle Mariners in front of 13,878 fans. The Cashman Field attendance record of 15,025 was set on April 3, 1993, for an exhibition game between the Chicago White Sox and Chicago Cubs.

The ballpark played host to the 1990 Triple-A All-Star Game which saw the team of National League-affiliated All-Stars defeat the team of American League-affiliated All-Stars, 8–5. Las Vegas' Eddie Williams was selected as the PCL MVP. In further interleague play, Cashman Field hosted the Triple-A World Series from 1998 until 2000.

Its final professional baseball game was played on September 3, 2018. With the 51s trailing 3–2 in the bottom of the ninth inning and a runner on base, first baseman Pete Alonso hit a walk-off home run to left field giving Las Vegas a 4–3 win over the Sacramento River Cats. The 51s (later renamed the Aviators) moved to Las Vegas Ballpark in Summerlin in 2019.

== Soccer ==
In July 2017, Las Vegas Lights FC, a team in the league then known as the United Soccer League and now as the USL Championship, was announced to begin playing at Cashman Field in 2018. Lights FC played their first game on February 10, 2018, an exhibition match against the Montreal Impact of Major League Soccer (MLS) in front of a crowd of 10,383 people. Cashman Field previously hosted MLS exhibition games between the LA Galaxy and San Jose Earthquakes, dubbed the California Clasico in 2016 and 2017.

The original configuration of Cashman Field is more suited for soccer than other former baseball parks. With center field at a right angle and all the foul territory behind first and third base at equal distance, the field is in a square shape and seats are close to the field for soccer. The Lights intended to renovate Cashman Field into a soccer-specific stadium after the Aviators baseball team formally terminated their lease at the stadium in 2019. However, the COVID-19 pandemic and cancellation of the 2020 season left the organization struggling to find the cashflow needed to properly renovate the aging facility. As of May 2023, the only renovations that the team has completed are fresh coats of paint throughout the walkways leading to the seating area. In 2024, a new seating area known as the Premium Deck was constructed on the eastern side of the field, adding suites and other premium areas. On August 13, 2026, the Lights confirmed that the team would be vacating Cashman Field at the end of the 2026 USL Championship season.

== American football ==
Though the original Cashman Field hosted several American football teams in the 1960s (including the UNLV Rebels football team, the Las Vegas Cowboys of the Continental Football League in 1969 and at least one American Football League exhibition), it ceased doing so around 1971 with the opening of Sam Boyd Stadium, which was designed for football. In 1964, the field was re-organized for an AFL charity game where the Oakland Raiders had played the Houston Oilers, in a game that the Raiders won 53 to 49. The Raiders eventually moved to Las Vegas full-time in 2020 and began playing at Allegiant Stadium in the unincorporated town of Paradise.

The stadium was also considered for use as the home stadium for the Las Vegas Locomotives of the United Football League of 2009 starting in 2011; however, the team remained at Sam Boyd Stadium in Whitney for that season's home games. The team again announced negotiations with Cashman for the 2012 season but decided again to remain at Sam Boyd for at least the first two games of the season. The league ceased operations before the season's other two home games, which Sam Boyd had not yet agreed to host, could take place.

On January 5, 2023, the XFL announced that the Vegas Vipers would play their home games at Cashman Field. When the Vipers took the field for the inaugural home game on February 25, fans and media alike lambasted the poor conditions of the playing field. Dead grass had been replaced in patches, and painted green in other areas. Tire trails from golf carts were visible on the field. A rare Las Vegas rainstorm made the bad conditions worse. On August 31, 2023, it was announced that the Vipers would not return to Cashman Field for the 2024 season, as the league would ultimately not retain Las Vegas as a market when it merged into the United Football League of 2024 (unrelated to the 2009 league).

== Other events ==
=== Other baseball events ===
From 2001 to 2003, the field hosted the Big League Challenge, a home run derby for star major leaguers after the conclusion of the MLB season.

In most years, Cashman Field hosted at least one Major League Baseball spring training game, dubbed Big League Weekend. The Cubs appeared in the game 13 consecutive times, with their final appearance in 2018.

In 2017, the stadium hosted the Mexican Baseball Fiesta, a series of two games between the Naranjeros de Hermosillo and the Águilas de Mexicali of the Mexican Pacific League.

The Oakland Athletics played six games at the facility during the 1996 season when the renovations for the Oakland Coliseum were not yet complete.

=== Rugby ===
Cashman Field was named the temporary home of Major League Rugby's San Diego Legion for the 2021 season due to the COVID-19 pandemic and scheduling issues at their normal home venue.

=== Concerts ===
Several concerts were held at the field such as Jerry Cantrell and Metallica on September 12, 1998. Other concerts have included The Beach Boys, Earth, Wind & Fire and The Doobie Brothers

=== Politics ===
In 2008, presidential candidate Barack Obama hosted a rally for supporters at Cashman Field, prior to his election as President of the United States. Obama returned to the site in 2012 for a re-election rally inside the adjacent Cashman Center.

=== Vaccination site ===
In 2021, the stadium was used as one of the largest mass vaccination sites in the United States.

== Problems and criticism ==
During the last years of Triple-A baseball at Cashman Field, players and staff from both the home and visiting teams criticized the facility. While it had been state-of-the-art when it opened, by the turn of the millennium it was considered far behind the times.

Players complained that the field was hard on their backs and knees. The bullpens and clubhouse were also considered second-class. The weight room was smaller when compared to other Triple-A stadiums, with infielder Ty Kelly calling it "basically just a room... not an actual weight room". The batting cage was also a point of concern for the players. It was a single lane, which was only accessible by walking out of the clubhouse to the parking lot. Johnny Monell described the cage as one likely to be found at a high school facility and not up to par for a Triple-A stadium.

During a 51s game on August 22, 2015, the stadium sewage system backed up, causing raw sewage to flow into the dugouts. The smell was so strong that players were forced to watch the rest of the game from chairs on the field. Team president and chief operating officer Don Logan said, "It's disappointing that Vegas has the worst facility in our league when we have such a great town with the greatest hotels, the greatest dining, the greatest shopping. It's not becoming of this community to have a place like this."

Pacific Coast League commissioner Branch Barrett Rickey expressed his concerns about the feasibility of the continuous usage of Cashman Field as a Triple-A ballpark. In a letter to the Las Vegas Convention and Visitors Authority which owned and operated the facility, he wrote that ensuring that the upgrades necessary to keep Cashman at something approaching Triple-A standards would require spending "many tens of millions of dollars" that would still not be enough to make the stadium "an optimal long-term solution." He also added that Cashman's days of useful life were "well behind it," and that most MLB teams opted to place their top affiliations in "far less appropriate markets" than Las Vegas rather than deal with Cashman's shortcomings. In 2019, Cashman was replaced as a baseball park by Las Vegas Ballpark in Summerlin.

The XFL had difficulties getting the playing surface to professional standards and maintaining it for the Vipers' use; dried, brown grass had to be painted green (causing the field to become slippery when heavy rains fell during the Vipers' home opener), divots caused by heavy equipment were noted on the field, ESPN's press box was open-air and covered by a tarp, and the boundary lines painted on the field were found to not be straight. Both the Vipers players and league president Russ Brandon noted that the field was structurally sound and held up well to the harsh conditions.

== Redevelopment and the future of Cashman Field ==
In 2017, the Las Vegas Convention and Visitors Authority, which had been the primary operators of Cashman Center and Cashman Field, turned over all operations to the City of Las Vegas. Since that time, the city has attempted to redevelop and revitalize the site, even soliciting ideas from the public. In 2018, the site was considered for a proposed stadium for the National Football League's Oakland Raiders during the team's relocation bid, however it was beat out by a larger site closer to the Las Vegas Strip. The city, so far, has been unsuccessful in its attempt to redevelop the site, with the convention halls and theater remaining closed, and only Cashman Field hosting events.

On June 5, 2019, the Las Vegas City Council voted to begin negotiations with the Renaissance Group to redevelop the Cashman Center and adjacent land also owned by the city to feature a new 25,000-seat soccer stadium as well as retail, hotels and residences.

On November 12, 2024, the Cashman Center and Cashman Field were put up on auction. Despite significant interest from several parties, the auction closed on November 19 without a single bid, largely due to a lack of an entitlement clause that would allow the highest bidder to pull out if they failed to obtain the required land entitlements within a certain time frame. The Lights announced they would be leaving Cashman Field once their pre-existing lease expired at the end of the 2026 USL Championship season, with the property slated for redevelopment.

== See also ==
- Sports in the Las Vegas metropolitan area

Events and tenants
Preceded by First stadium	Home of the Las Vegas 51s 1983–2018	Succeeded by Las Vegas Ballpark
Preceded by First stadium	Home of the Las Vegas Lights FC; 2018–present	Succeeded by Current
Preceded by Raymond James Stadium	Home of the Vegas Vipers; 2023–present	Succeeded by Current
