= City National Arena =

Ice hockey arena in Summerlin, Nevada

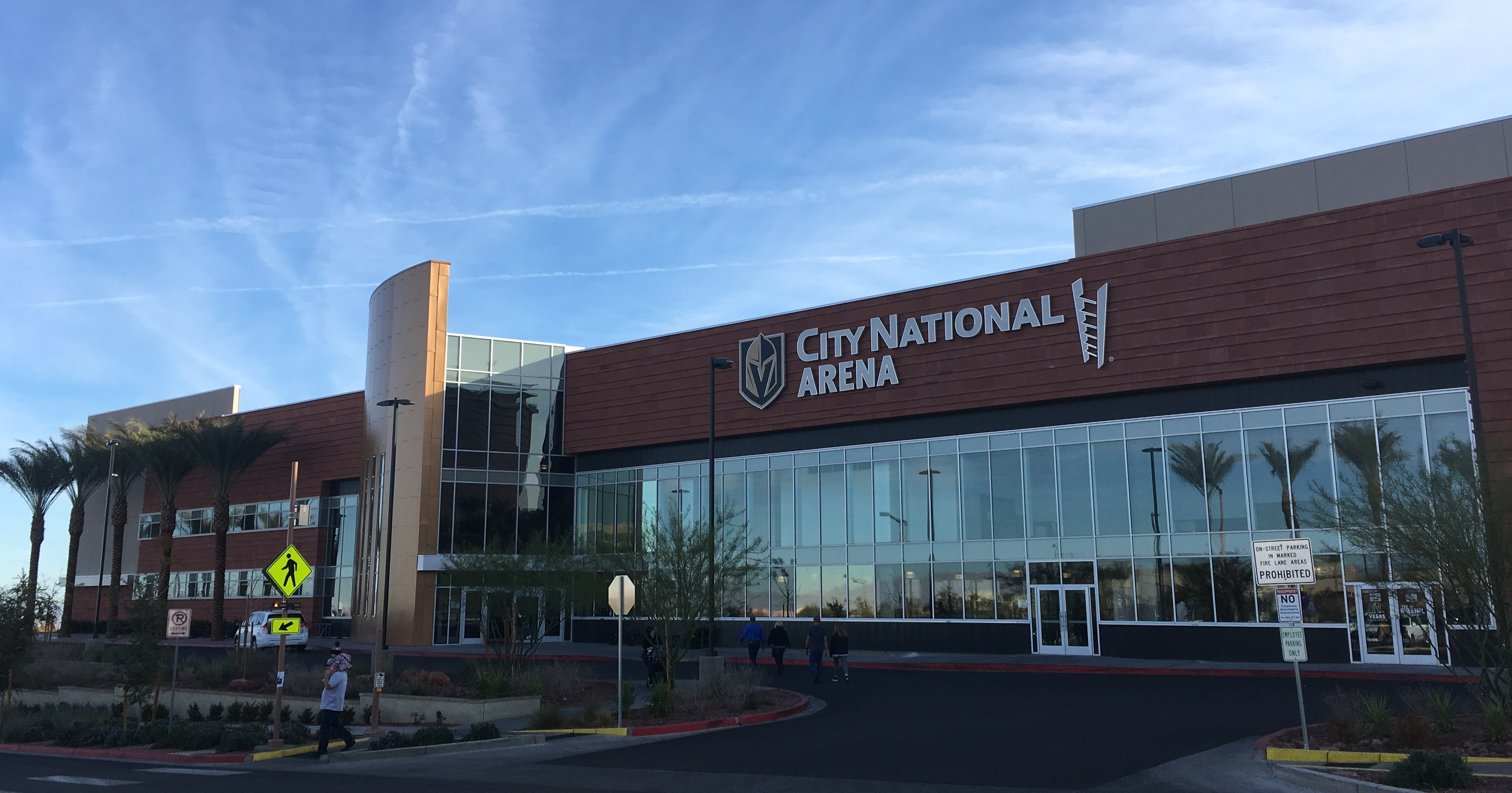

- Location in Nevada Location in the United States Location in North America
- Interactive map of City National Arena
- Address: 1550 South Pavilion Center Drive
- Location: Summerlin South, Nevada, U.S.
- Coordinates: 36.1540°N 115.3294°W
- Owner: Vegas Golden Knights (building); Howard Hughes Holdings (land)
- Operator: Vegas Golden Knights
- Capacity: 600 (per rink)
- Surface: 200' x 85' (Rinks 1 and 2)
- Public transit: RTC Transit Downtown Summerlin Transit Facility

Construction
- Groundbreaking: October 5, 2016; 10 years ago
- Opened: September 18, 2017; 9 years ago
- Cost: $25–30 million
- Architect: Leo A. Daly

Tenants
- Vegas Golden Knights (practice facility); Las Vegas Thunderbirds (USPHL) (2020–2024)

City National Arena is the practice facility and team headquarters of the Vegas Golden Knights of the National Hockey League. City National Arena opened on September 18, 2017, and is located in Summerlin South, Nevada, a suburb of Las Vegas. It contains the headquarters for the team, a team store, and a MacKenzie River Pizza, Grill & Pub restaurant, among other features. It was also the home venue for the Las Vegas Thunderbirds from 2020 to 2024.

== History ==
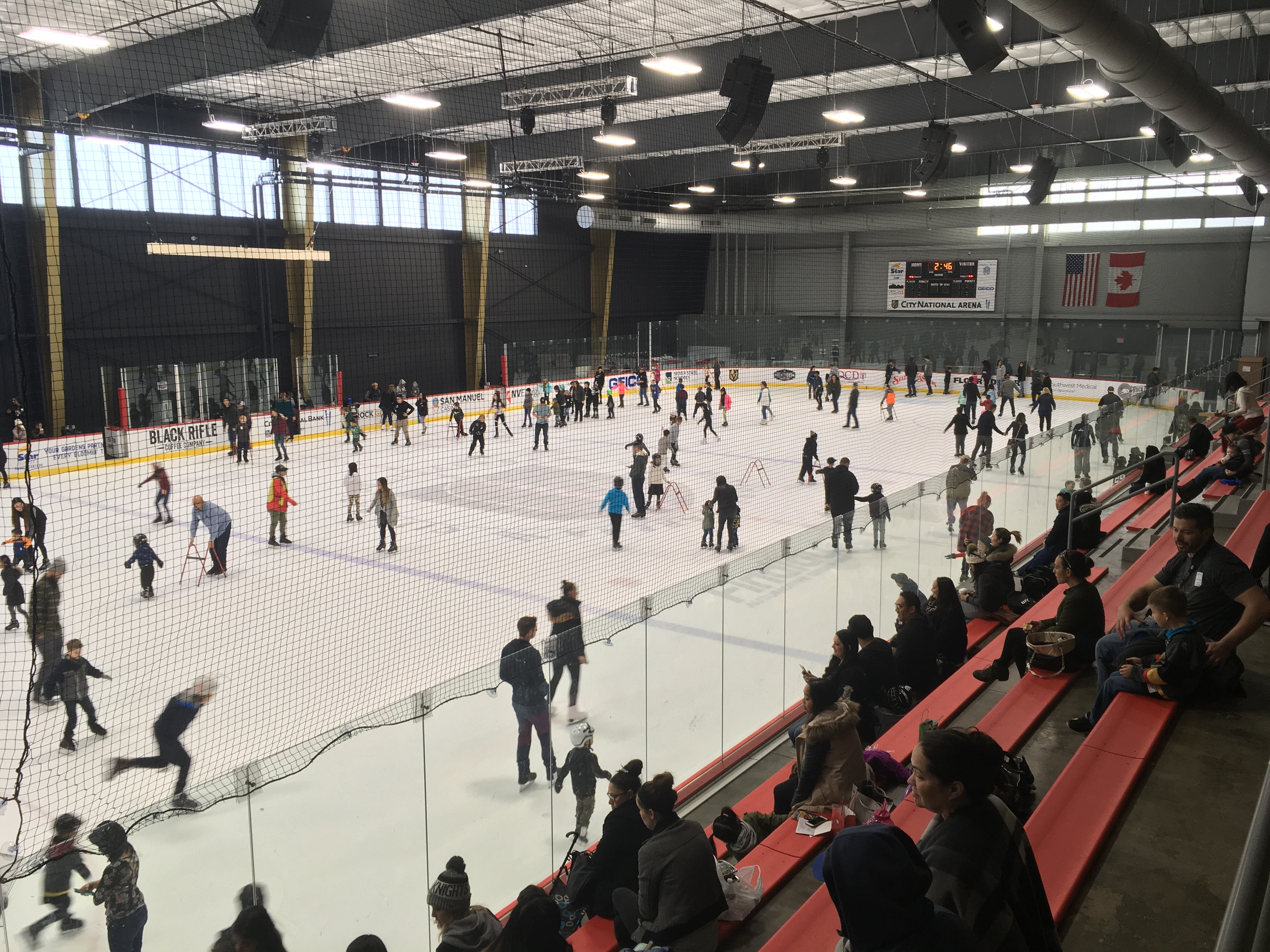
One of the arena's two ice rinks during an open skate event in 2018.

Ground was broken on City National Arena on October 5, 2016, shortly after the National Hockey League granted Las Vegas an expansion franchise due to play beginning in the 2017–18 NHL season. It was also built partly to be a hub for recreational and youth hockey for Southern Nevada. In July 2017, the team, now named the Vegas Golden Knights, reached a multi-year deal with City National Bank for the naming rights of the facility branding it as City National Arena. The facility opened on September 18, 2017, after 11 months of construction. County commissioner Steve Sisolak declared the day "City National Arena Day".

The arena is the home of the UNLV Skatin' Rebels hockey program. The Rebels moved to the arena from splitting time between the Las Vegas Ice Center and SoBe Ice Arena over the previous ten years. City National Arena becoming the home to the Rebel's hockey program allowed the program to move up to ACHA Division 1. The team's first game at the arena was on September 22, 2017, a 3–0 loss against University of Colorado.

The arena has also hosted showcases for the Western States Hockey League.

The facility is owned by the Vegas Golden Knights on land owned by the Howard Hughes Corporation. The primary designer of the facility was Murray Craven who was the Vegas Golden Knights first senior vice president and a 17-year NHL veteran. Craven took what he thought to be the best features among other practice faculties around the league and incorporated them into City National Arena. The facility is two floors and 146,000 square feet and features two regulation rinks, team locker rooms for both the Golden Knights and UNLV, sports medicine facilities, equipment room, video room, player lounge, coaches’ offices, restaurant and bar, team store, skate rental, and snack bar. Team offices are on the second floor. The facility has become a favorite among players.

The Golden Knights practice and UNLV play on Rink 1 which is branded as Summerlin Hospital Rink. Both Rinks 1 and 2 have a capacity of 600. Rink 2 is branded the Ghost Energy Rink.

Soon after the opening of the City National Arena in 2017, Las Vegas Ballpark was constructed on land behind the building for the Las Vegas Aviators baseball team.

== See also ==
- Allegiant Stadium
- T-Mobile Arena
- Sports in the Las Vegas metropolitan area
