= Henderson Force =

- City: Henderson, Nevada
- League: United States Premier Hockey League; Premier Division
- Division: Pacific
- Founded: 2019
- Home arena: America First Center
- Colors: Black, blue, grey, white
- Owners: Marco Benvenuti, Joe Micatrotto, Allan Creel
- Head coach: Landon Quinney
- Website: https://hendersonforce.com/

Franchise history
- 2019–2024: Las Vegas Thunderbirds
- 2024–2026: Henderson Force

The Henderson Force are a junior ice hockey team in the United States Premier Hockey League (USPHL). The Force play their home games at America First Center in Henderson, Nevada, in the Las Vegas Valley.

== History ==
In June 2023, three local Las Vegas entrepreneurs — Joe Micatrotto, Marco Benvenuti and Allan Creel — purchased the Las Vegas Thunderbirds from Adam Bonaldi and Corey St. Germain. The team relocated to Henderson from Summerlin South, Nevada, for the 2024–25 season, and were rebranded as the Force. Following the 2025-26 season the Henderson Force leadership determined it was in their best interest to withdraw from the USPHL Premier League and seek out alternative opportunities.

== Season-by-season records ==
Season	GP	W	L	OTL	Pts	GF	GA	PIM	Finish	Playoffs
2024–25	46	29	15	2	60	189	132	786	4th of 8, Pacific; 25th of 73, USPHL-Premier	Lost Div. Semifinal, 0-2 vs. Fresno Monsters
2025-26	46	36	8	2	74	258	116	782	2nd of 8, Pacific; 7th of 77, USPHL-Premier	Lost Div. Semifinal, 1-2 vs. Ontario Jr. Reign
