= Las Vegas Tabagators =

- Full name: Las Vegas Tabagators
- Nickname: Tabagators
- Founded: 2005
- Stadium: Bettye Wilson Soccer Complex
- Chairman: (United States) Saeed Bonabian
- Manager: (United States) Saeed Bonabian
- League: Women's Premier Soccer League
- 2006: 8th, West
Home colours	Away colours

Las Vegas Tabagators was an American women's soccer team, founded in 2005. The team was a member of the Women's Premier Soccer League, the third tier of women’s soccer in the United States and Canada, until 2006, when the team left the league and the franchise was terminated.

The team played its home games in the Bettye Wilson Soccer Complex in Las Vegas, Nevada. The team's colors were white, gold and black.

The name "Tabagators" came from TAB Contractors, the team's sponsor. Prior to joining the WPSL the Tabagators were among the most successful youth clubs in the region, having won 5 state titles.

The team was associated with the National Premier Soccer League franchise Las Vegas Strikers, which has also since folded.

== Year-by-year ==
Year	Division	League	Reg. season	Playoffs
2005	2	WPSL	6th, West	
2006	2	WPSL	8th, West	Did not qualify
