= Frank D'Amelio =

American soccer player (born 1957)

Personal information
- Date of birth: March 14, 1957 (age 69)
- Place of birth: Turin, Italy
- Position: Defender

College career
Years	Team	Apps	(Gls)
1976	Adelphi Panthers		
1978–1979	Evansville Purple Aces		

Senior career*
Years	Team	Apps	(Gls)
1980	Philadelphia Fury	8	(0)
1980–1981	Fort Lauderdale Strikers (indoor)	17	(3)
1981	New York United		

Managerial career
- 1980: University of Evansville (assistant)
- 1982: Reitz Memorial High School
- Baldwin High School (assistant)
- 1998–2005: UNLV (assistant)
- 2003–2006: Las Vegas Strikers
- Valley High School
- 2006: Las Vegas Toros
- * Club domestic league appearances and goals

Frank D'Amelio (born March 14, 1957) is an American former soccer defender who played one season in the North American Soccer League, one in the American Soccer League and the 1980–81 indoor NASL season. He later coached for over two decades on the collegiate, high school and youth club levels.

== Playing career ==
Born in Italy, D'Amelio moved to the United States at some point during his early youth. He grew up on Long Island, New York and attended Baldwin High School. He began college at Adelphi University in 1976. He took a year off to play for the U.S. U-21 national team in 1977 then returned to college at the University of Evansville. He spent the 1978 and 1979 seasons with the Purple Aces. He was inducted into the Evansville Athletic Hall of Fame in 1992. In 1980, the Philadelphia Fury selected D'Amelio in the first round of the North American Soccer League's college draft. He played eight games for the Fury. In the fall of 1981, he moved to the Fort Lauderdale Strikers and played the 1980–81 NASL season before being released. He then moved to New York United for the 1981 American Soccer League season. United went to the championship game where it fell to the Carolina Lightnin'. He retired from playing professionally at the end of the season.

== Coaching career ==
D'Amelio began his coaching career as an assistant coach with Evansville in the fall of 1980 as he finished his bachelor's degree in languages. In 1982, he coached the Reitz Memorial High School soccer team to the semifinals of the Indiana State championship. However, it was an unpaid position and D'Amelio was making a living as a construction worker with Traylor Brothers Construction Company. In March 1983, his brother and sister were able to get him a position as a blackjack dealer in Las Vegas at a considerable increase in salary compared to his construction work. He lived in Nevada for only a year or two before moving to East Rockaway, New York where he worked for KLM. He also played at the amateur level and was an assistant coach with Baldwin High School. In 1993, he returned to Las Vegas. In 1998, he became an assistant coach at UNLV, a position he held for eight seasons. In 2003, he became the head coach of the Las Vegas Strikers in the National Premier Soccer League. The Strikers folded following the 2006 season. He also coached at Valley High School. In 2006, he coached the Las Vegas Toros in the National Alliance Soccer League.
