= Ontario Jr. Reign =

- City: Ontario, California
- League: United States Premier Hockey League NCDC
- Conference: West
- Division: Pacific
- Founded: 2021
- Home arena: Ontario Ice Skating Center
- Colors: Black and silver
- General manager: Jeremy Blumes
- Head coach: Jeremy Blumes

Franchise history
- 2021–present: Ontario Jr. Reign

The Ontario Jr. Reign are a junior ice hockey team that is currently a member of the United States Premier Hockey League (USPHL) NCDC Division. The Jr. Reign play their home games at the Ontario Ice Skating Center in Ontario, California.

== History ==
On May 26, 2021, the USPHL announced the approval of the Ontario Jr. Reign as an expansion franchise for the upcoming season. The team was placed in the Pacific region of the Premier Division. The team shares their logo and colors with the Ontario Reign.

== Season-by-season records ==
Season	GP	W	L	OTL	Pts	GF	GA	Finish	Playoffs
2021–22	44	19	23	2	40	183	234	4th of 6, Pacific Div. t-42nd of 64, USPHL Premier	Lost Div. Semifinal series, 0–2 (Fresno Monsters)
2022–23	46	34	11	1	69	268	154	3rd of 7, Pacific Div. t-14th of 70, USPHL Premier	Lost Div. Semifinal series, 0–2 (Las Vegas Thunderbirds)
2023–24	46	37	8	1	75	241	110	2nd of 7, Pacific Div. t-4th of 61, USPHL Premier	Won Div. Semifinal series, 2–1 (Las Vegas Thunderbirds); Lost Div. Final series, 0–2 (Fresno Monsters)
2024–25	46	33	11	2	68	245	126	3rd of 8, Pacific Div. t-11th of 73, USPHL Premier	Won Div. Semifinal series, 2–0 (Lake Tahoe Lakers); Lost Div. Final series, 0–2 (Fresno Monsters)
2025–26	46	35	9	2	72	234	104	3rd of 7, Pacific Div. 10th of 77, USPHL Premier	Won Div. Semifinal series, 2–1 (Henderson Force); Won Div. Final series, 2-1 (Fresno Monsters); Advance to Nationals - Pool 2 eliminated pool rounds - scores of {Won 5-3 Coral Springs Jr. Cats)(Lost Fresno Monsters 1-9)(Lost 0-6 Hampton Road Whalers
