= Bettye Wilson Soccer Complex =

Sports complex in Las Vegas, Nevada

- Location in Nevada Location in the United States Location in North America
- Interactive map of Bettye Wilson Soccer Complex
- Address: 7353 Eugene Avenue
- Location: Las Vegas, Nevada, U.S.
- Coordinates: 36.197638°N 115.253534°W
- Owner: City of Las Vegas
- Operator: City of Las Vegas

Construction
- Opened: 2001; 25 years ago

Tenants
- Las Vegas Strikers (NPSL) (2003); Las Vegas Tabagators (WPSL) (2005)

The Bettye Wilson Soccer Complex is a 10-field soccer complex located on 58.3 acres (23.6 ha) in Las Vegas, Nevada. The facility is located adjacent to Cimarron-Memorial High School. The complex is home to the Las Vegas Mayors Cup International Tournaments. The Las Vegas Mayors Cup is the nation's largest international soccer tournament. The complex is also the host for the Players College Showcase, the first college showcase tournament in the country. Bettye Wilson Soccer Complex is named after Bettye Wilson. Wilson was a pioneer in Las Vegas youth soccer and was responsible for creating Nevada's first girls' soccer league.

== Professional teams ==
- Las Vegas Strikers, National Premier Soccer League (2003)
- Las Vegas Tabagators, Women's Premier Soccer League (2005)
