= Las Vegas Thunderbirds =

- City: Summerlin South, Nevada
- League: United States Premier Hockey League
- Division: Premier – Pacific
- Founded: 2019
- Home arena: City National Arena (2020–2024); Pepsi Ice Arena (2019–2020)
- Colors: Black, orange, grey, white
- Owners: Marco Benvenuti, Joe Micatrotto, Allan Creel
- Head coach: Matthew Johnson; Landon Quinney
- Affiliates: Ogden Mustangs (NCDC)
- Website: https://tbirds.vegas/

Franchise history
- 2019–2024: Las Vegas Thunderbirds
- 2024–present: Henderson Force

Championships
- Division titles: 1 (2022–23)

The Las Vegas Thunderbirds were a junior ice hockey team in the United States Premier Hockey League (USPHL). The Thunderbirds played their home games at City National Arena in Summerlin South, Nevada, in the Las Vegas Valley.

== History ==
The Las Vegas Thunderbirds were announced by the Western States Hockey League (WSHL) as an expansion team on February 14, 2019. They began play in the 2019–20 season. Team ownership included Corey St. Germain, while its president was announced as former NHL player John Marks. Marks had previously coached at junior and professional hockey. He retired from coaching in 2015 after four seasons leading the Fargo Force of the United States Hockey League. The team played their first season at SoBe Ice Arena.

In 2020, the Thunderbirds left the WSHL after one season and joined another independent junior hockey league, the United States Premier Hockey League (USPHL), at the Premier (Tier III) level. They also moved their home games to City National Arena beginning with the 2020–21 season. In 2022, the team improved and reaching the conference final against the Fresno Monsters. In 2023, they clinched their first division title by sweeping Fresno in the playoff final. This result allowed the Thunderbirds to advance to the USPHL Premier National Championship, held in Utica, New York, for the first time in their history.

In June 2023, three local Las Vegas entrepreneurs — Joe Micatrotto, Marco Benvenuti and Allan Creel — purchased the team from Adam Bonaldi and Corey St. Germain. The team relocated to Henderson, Nevada for the 2024–25 season, and were rebranded as the Henderson Force.

== Season-by-season records ==
Season	GP	W	L	OTW	OTL	Pts	GF	GA	PIM	Finish	Playoffs
WSHL
2019–20	51	26	22	2	1	83 (Note: The WSHL awarded 3pts for a win, 2pts for an overtime win, and 1pt for an overtime loss.)	194	146	605	3rd of 5, Western; 11th of 20, WSHL	Playoffs cancelled
USPHL–Premier
2020–21	40	24	14	—	2	50	196	149	1028	2nd of 5, Pacific; 28th of 62, USPHL-Premier	Won Div. Semifinal game, 4–0 (Anaheim Avalanche); Lost Division Championship game, 2–7 (Fresno Monsters)
2021–22	44	29	14	—	1	59	213	192	857	2nd of 6, Pacific; 20th of 64, USPHL-Premier	Won Div. Semifinal, 2–0 (Lake Tahoe Lakers); Lost division finals, 0–2 (Fresno Monsters)
2022–23	46	34	9	4	3	71	278	148	881	2nd of 7, Pacific; 12th of 69, USPHL-Premier	Won Div. Semifinal, 2–0 (Ontario Jr. Reign); Won Division Finals, 2-0 (Fresno Monsters); Seeding Rd: (L, 2–5 (Metro Jets); L, 2–4 (Tampa Bay Juniors); Lost Eighthfinal, 3–6 (Richmond Generals)
2023–24	46	31	14	1	-	63	222	151	857	3rd of 7, Pacific; 17th of 61, USPHL-Premier	Lost Div. Semifinal, 0-2 (Ontario Jr. Reign)
