= Las Vegas Blackjacks RFC =

US rugby union club, based in Las Vegas, NV

(United States) Las Vegas RFC
- Full name: Las Vegas Rugby Football Club
- Union: USA Rugby
- Nickname: Blackjacks
- Founded: 1976; 50 years ago
- Ground: Charlie Frias Park
- President: Thomas Carter
- Coach: Herve Mazzocco
- League: SCRFU Division I
1st kit	2nd kit

Official website
- www.vegasblackjacksrugby.com

The Las Vegas Blackjacks Rugby Football Club (Las Vegas Blackjacks RFC) was a rugby union team based in Las Vegas, Nevada. They were members of the Southern California Rugby Football Union and competed in the Senior Men's 1st (Red) Division of USA Rugby.

The Blackjacks finished in fourth place at the USA Rugby Nationals - Division I Tournament and won their first SCRFU Regular Season title in 2008. The Blackjacks won the regular season again in 2009 and made it to the National Final where they lost to the Gentlemen of Aspen. Redemption was found in 2010 as the boys claimed the nations top prize with a win in the national final against Belmont Shore.

== History ==
The Las Vegas Rugby Club was established in 1976, following a newspaper advertisement to recruit players for a local rugby club. The Blackjacks have reached the National Final 4 competition three times since 2006 and were the national runner-up in 2009. The club finally reached the mountain top as they edged Belmont Shore for the 2010 National Championship.

In 2010, LVRC signed a player development agreement with Top 14 side, Montpellier Hérault RC. The agreement with Montpellier will have the French side sending young players to play with LVRC during France's offseason, while allowing amateur players with the Blackjacks the opportunity to play top-level professional rugby.

== Season-by-season record ==
Note: W = Wins, L = Losses, D = Draws, Pts = Points, PF = Points for, PA = Points against

Season	W	L	D	Pts	PF	PA	Finish	Playoffs
2003	4	7	0	-	174	283	5th, Division I	USA Sweet 16
2004	2	6	0	-	130	278	6th Division I
2005	2	7	1	-	142	226	7th, Division I
2006	9	4	0	-	347	174	2nd, Division I	National Semifinalist
2007	5	7	0	26	219	250	4th, Division I	Lost in Round of 32
2008	9	2	1	48	375	130	1st, Division I	National Quarterfinals
2009	5	1	0	25	192	45	T-1st, Division I	National Finalists
2010	4	1	1	22	309	115	2nd, Division I	National Champions
2011	5	8	0	25	285	323	5th, Division I	DNQ

== Sponsors ==
The Blackjacks were sponsored by several different companies, including McMullan's Irish Pub, Bugsy's Bar and Grill, and the Megapixel Cafe. Canterbury of New Zealand is the official merchandise supplier of the team in 2012.

== Honors ==
=== Club Championships ===
- USA Rugby Premier Division
  - Champions - 2010
  - 2nd Place - 2009
  - 4th Place - 2006
- SCRFU Division I
  - Gainy Cup Champions - 2009
  - Regular Season Champions - 2008
  - Playoff Champions - 2008
