= Tate Snyder Kimsey Architects =

American architectural firm

Tate Snyder Kimsey Architect is an architectural practice located in Las Vegas, Nevada with branches in Reno, Los Angeles, and Shenzhen.

== History ==
The firm was established in 1960 as George G. Tate & Associates. Bill Snyder joined the firm in 1979 and Windom Kimsey in 1991; Kimsey is currently the firm's president and CEO.

In 1998 the firm, then known as Tate & Snyder Architects, was honored with the AIA Western Mountain Region Honor Award as the Architectural Firm of the Year. The firm received AIA Nevada awards in 1996, 1998, 2005 and 2019.

== Headquarters building ==
The 11,000-square-foot (1,000 m^{2}) office building of Tate Snyder Kimsey Architects at 709 Valle Verde Court in Henderson, Nevada was built in 1994 and expanded in 1997. In 2006 it became the first building in Nevada to receive LEED certification from the U.S. Green Building Council. This building has won three AIA Nevada Design Awards in the years 1997, 1996, and 1993.

== Projects ==
The firm has done multiple projects for Los Angeles International Airport, McCarran International Airport, the Port of Long Beach, the University of Nevada Las Vegas, and other schools and government buildings. The Animal Foundation headquarters in Las Vegas was praised for its "green" features including wind turbines, solar panels, and water recycling. The company has designed one building in Shenzhen, China, and in 2012 it received a state export grant to allow it to expand its presence there. In 2011 the company received two awards from the Las Vegas AIA for projects still under development: a port of entry on the United States-Mexico border in San Diego and the Symphony Park project in downtown Las Vegas.
