= Las Vegas Strikers =

- Full name: Las Vegas Strikers
- Nickname: The Strikers
- Founded: 2003
- Dissolved: 2008
- Chairman: Steve Lazarus, Frederic Apcar
- Manager: Frank D'Amelio
- League: National Premier Soccer League
- 2006: 6th, did not make playoffs
Home colours	Away colours

Las Vegas Strikers were an American soccer team, founded in 2003. The team were a member of the National Premier Soccer League (NPSL), the fourth tier of the American Soccer Pyramid, and play in the Southwest Conference.

The Strikers played their home matches at the Bettye Wilson Soccer Complex in Las Vegas, Nevada. The team's colors are yellow, white, red and black.

In 2006 the team's management announced that they would spend the 2007 NPSL season on hiatus, but after two seasons on hiatus, the team officially folded in 2008.

== Year-by-year ==
Year	Division	League	Reg. season	Playoffs	Open Cup
2003	"4"	MPSL	6th	Did not qualify	Did not qualify
2004	"4"	MPSL	8th	Did not qualify	Did not qualify
2005	"4"	NPSL	7th, Western	Did not qualify	Did not qualify
2006	"4"	NPSL	6th, Southwest	Did not qualify	Did not qualify
