= Wendy's 3-Tour Challenge =

Tournament information
- Location: Henderson, Nevada
- Established: 1992
- Course: Rio Secco Golf Club
- Organized by: Dave Thomas Foundation for Adoption
- Format: Stroke play
- Prize fund: $1 million
- Final year: 2013

Final champion
- Natalie Gulbis, Cristie Kerr, Stacy Lewis
- Location within Nevada

The Wendy's 3-Tour Challenge was an unofficial golf event held in November at the Rio Secco Golf Club in Henderson, Nevada at Reflection Bay Golf Club. The tournament was a unique stroke play event, and, as the name suggests, pitted three teams, with three members per team, from the PGA Tour, the LPGA Tour, and the Champions Tour (known as the Senior PGA Tour prior to 2001) against each other. The 2013 purse was $1 million.

The challenge event was done in one day, over 18 holes, and is usually held on a Tuesday. It was preceded by an amateur tournament and a one-day pro-am tournament. The event was handicapped to provide all competitors a fair and equal chance of succeeding. The PGA Tour players played the course at its full length, while the Champions Tour players hit from tee positions that made the course shorter and the LPGA players from even shorter tee positions.

The event supported the Dave Thomas Foundation for Adoption, a charity established by the founder of Wendy's, the fast food restaurant that sponsored the tournament. In 2013, the tournament raised a record $4.1 million, and, since it was founded in 1992, it raised more than $50 million overall for the charity.

ABC televised the event until 2009, showing the tournament tape-delayed on a weekend in December just before Christmas, with the first nine holes broadcast on Saturday, and the final nine holes on Sunday. Terry Gannon did the on-air play-by-play. From 2010 to 2013, the event aired on the Golf Channel.

== Winners ==
Year	Winning tour	Players representing winning tour	Other teams	
2013	LPGA	Natalie Gulbis, Cristie Kerr, Stacy Lewis	Champions: Fred Funk, Bernhard Langer, Kenny Perry	PGA: Jason Day, Billy Horschel, Boo Weekley
2012	PGA	Jason Day, Davis Love III, Nick Watney	LPGA: Natalie Gulbis, Cristie Kerr, Stacy Lewis	Champions: Fred Funk, Bernhard Langer, Tom Lehman
2011	Champions	Mark Calcavecchia, Jay Haas, Kenny Perry	LPGA: Paula Creamer, Natalie Gulbis, Cristie Kerr	PGA: Jonathan Byrd, Boo Weekley, Gary Woodland
2010	PGA	Dustin Johnson, Bubba Watson, Boo Weekley	Champions: Bernhard Langer, Kenny Perry, Nick Price	LPGA: Natalie Gulbis, Cristie Kerr, Suzann Pettersen
2009	LPGA	Natalie Gulbis, Cristie Kerr, Suzann Pettersen	Champions: Fred Funk, Jay Haas, Nick Price	PGA: Stewart Cink, Fred Couples, Bubba Watson
2008	Champions	Fred Funk, Jay Haas, Nick Price	LPGA: Helen Alfredsson, Natalie Gulbis, Cristie Kerr	PGA: Stewart Cink, Rocco Mediate, Kenny Perry
2007	LPGA	Natalie Gulbis, Cristie Kerr, Morgan Pressel	Champions: Fred Funk, Jay Haas, Nick Price	PGA: Chris DiMarco, Camilo Villegas, Bubba Watson
2006	PGA	Stewart Cink, Zach Johnson, Scott Verplank	Champions: Jay Haas, Tom Kite, Craig Stadler	LPGA: Natalie Gulbis, Juli Inkster, Cristie Kerr
2005	Champions	Jay Haas, Hale Irwin, Craig Stadler	LPGA: Grace Park, Lorena Ochoa, Cristie Kerr	PGA: Mark Calcavecchia, Fred Couples, John Daly
2004	LPGA	Grace Park, Juli Inkster, Cristie Kerr	Champions: Peter Jacobsen, Tom Kite, Craig Stadler	PGA: Jay Haas, Fred Couples, John Daly
2003	PGA	Mark Calcavecchia, Peter Jacobsen, John Daly	LPGA: Grace Park, Juli Inkster, Rachel Teske	Champions: Hale Irwin, Tom Kite, Craig Stadler
2002	PGA	Rich Beem, John Daly, Jim Furyk	LPGA: Juli Inkster, Laura Diaz, Karrie Webb	Senior: Ben Crenshaw, Tom Kite, Gary McCord
2001	LPGA	Dottie Pepper, Annika Sörenstam, Karrie Webb	Senior: Jack Nicklaus, Tom Watson, Fuzzy Zoeller	PGA: Mark Calcavecchia, John Daly, Fred Couples
2000	PGA	Notah Begay III, Rocco Mediate, Phil Mickelson	LPGA: Karrie Webb, Juli Inkster, Dottie Pepper	Senior: Hale Irwin, Tom Kite, Tom Watson
1999	Senior PGA	Hale Irwin, Jack Nicklaus, Tom Watson	LPGA: Karrie Webb, Juli Inkster, Dottie Pepper	PGA: Lee Janzen, Tom Lehman, Justin Leonard
1998	Senior PGA	Hale Irwin, Gil Morgan, Larry Nelson	LPGA: Annika Sörenstam, Donna Andrews, Se Ri Pak	PGA: Fred Couples, Davis Love III, Justin Leonard
1997	PGA	Fred Couples, Tom Lehman, Phil Mickelson	Senior: Johnny Miller, Larry Nelson, Jack Nicklaus	LPGA: Nancy Lopez, Annika Sörenstam, Karrie Webb
1996	PGA	Fred Couples, Davis Love III, Payne Stewart	Senior: Jim Colbert, Raymond Floyd, Hale Irwin	LPGA: Laura Davies, Patty Sheehan, Annika Sörenstam
1995	Senior PGA	Raymond Floyd, Hale Irwin, Jack Nicklaus	LPGA: Laura Davies, Dottie Mochrie, Kelly Robbins	PGA: John Daly, Peter Jacobsen, Lee Janzen
1994	PGA	Paul Azinger, Fred Couples, Greg Norman	Senior: Raymond Floyd, Jack Nicklaus, Dave Stockton	LPGA: Laura Davies, Nancy Lopez, Patty Sheehan
1993	Senior PGA	Raymond Floyd, Jack Nicklaus, Chi-Chi Rodríguez	LPGA: Nancy Lopez, Lauri Merten, Patty Sheehan	PGA: Paul Azinger, Lee Janzen, Greg Norman
1992	LPGA	Nancy Lopez, Dottie Mochrie, Patty Sheehan	Senior: Larry Laoretti, Jack Nicklaus, Chi-Chi Rodríguez	PGA: Fred Couples, Raymond Floyd, Tom Kite

=== Summary ===
Tour	Wins
PGA Tour	9
Champions Tour	7
LPGA Tour	6

== See also ==
- Hitachi 3Tours Championship (similar Japanese golf event)
