= Railroad Pass (Nevada) =

Mountain pass in Nevada

- Interactive map of Railroad Pass
- Elevation: 2,358 feet (719 m)

First Approach
- Traversed by: Dawson Avenue

Second Approach
- Traversed by: I-11 / US 93 / US 95 (Purple Heart Highway)

Third Approach
- Traversed by: Boulder City spur (Union Pacific Railroad)
- Location: Henderson, Nevada
- Range: Black Hills
- Coordinates: 35°58′44″N 114°54′54″W

Railroad Pass, 2,358 ft (719 m), is a mountain pass through the Black Hills of the River Mountains in the southeastern portion of the city of Henderson, Nevada, which is part of the Las Vegas Valley. Traversed by the Union Pacific Railroad's Boulder City spur of the Henderson branch line and Purple Heart Highway (I-11/US 93/US 95), the pass connects Henderson with Boulder City.

In 1998, the Nevada Department of Transportation (NDOT) paved over the at-grade crossing of the railroad tracks on Boulder Highway. The sharp skew angle (64 degrees) at this junction, high speeds on the highway, and little to no rail usage made this dangerous crossing a prime candidate for elimination. However, the historical significance of this rail spur and future potential for use by excursion and/or commuter trains merited its preservation. The initial phase of NDOT's Boulder City Bypass project will result in a new grade separation of the highway by 2015, allowing the rails to be reconnected so trains can once again reach Boulder City via Railroad Pass, As of April 10, 2018 the grade separation was complete, effectively allowing trains to reach Henderson.

The Railroad Pass Hotel/Casino, is sited on the south side of the pass. Opened on August 1, 1931, it is one of the oldest casinos still operating in Nevada.
