= Clark County Museum =

History museum in Henderson, Nevada

Coordinates: 36°00′37″N 114°56′43″W

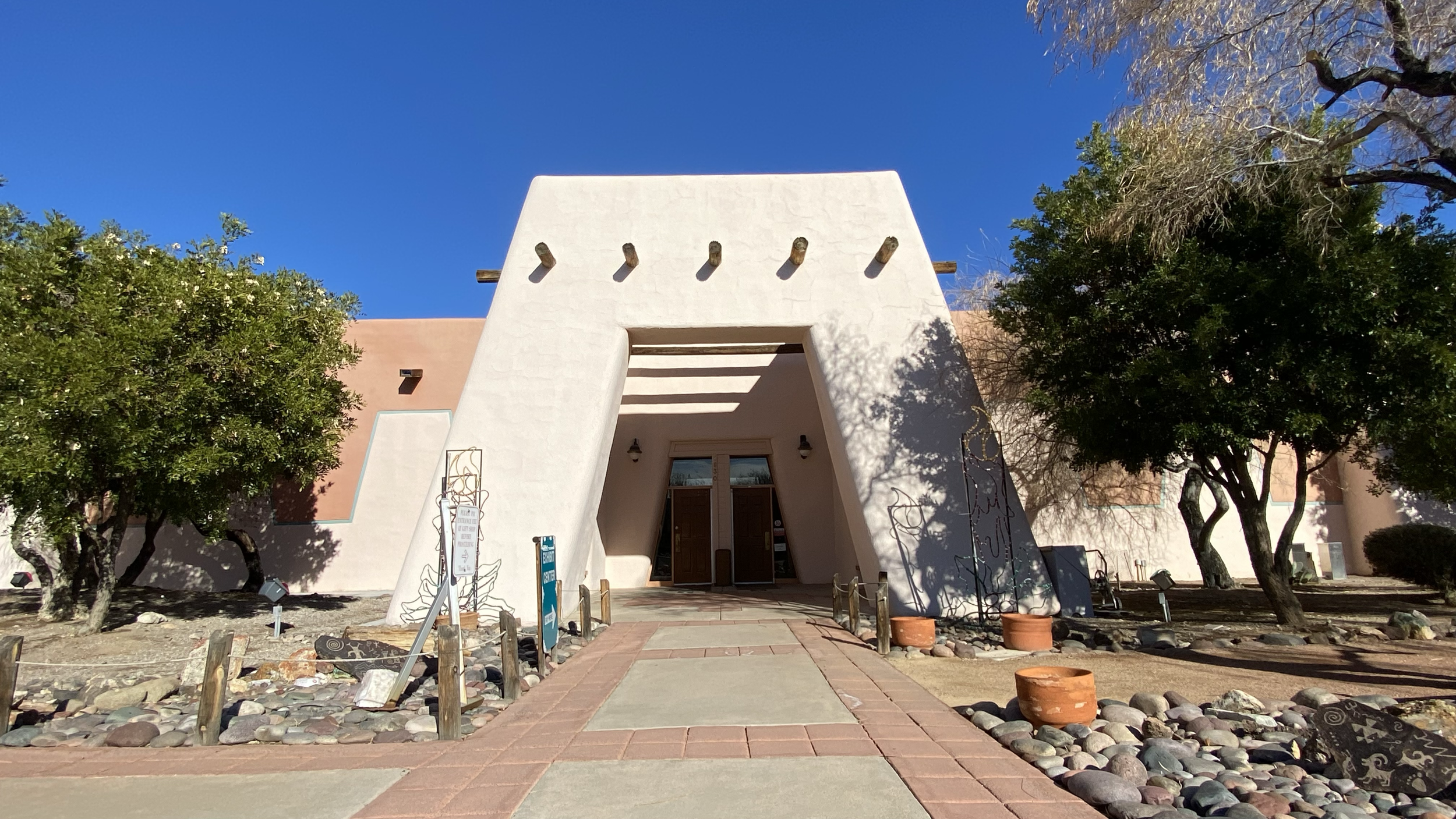
- Clark County Museum main entrance
- Location: 1830 South Boulder Highway, Henderson, Nevada, U.S.
- Type: History museum
- Director: Clark County Parks and Recreation Department
- Website: Official website

The Clark County Museum is a public history museum located in Henderson, Nevada operated by the Clark County Parks and Recreation Department. The museum preserves and interprets the cultural, social, and industrial history of Southern Nevada. Its thirty-acre campus combines an indoor exhibition hall with a collection of historic structures and outdoor interpretive spaces. The institution is considered one of the principal regional museums of the Las Vegas Valley, offering visitors opportunities to explore the area's heritage through artifacts, relocated architecture, and educational programming.

== History ==
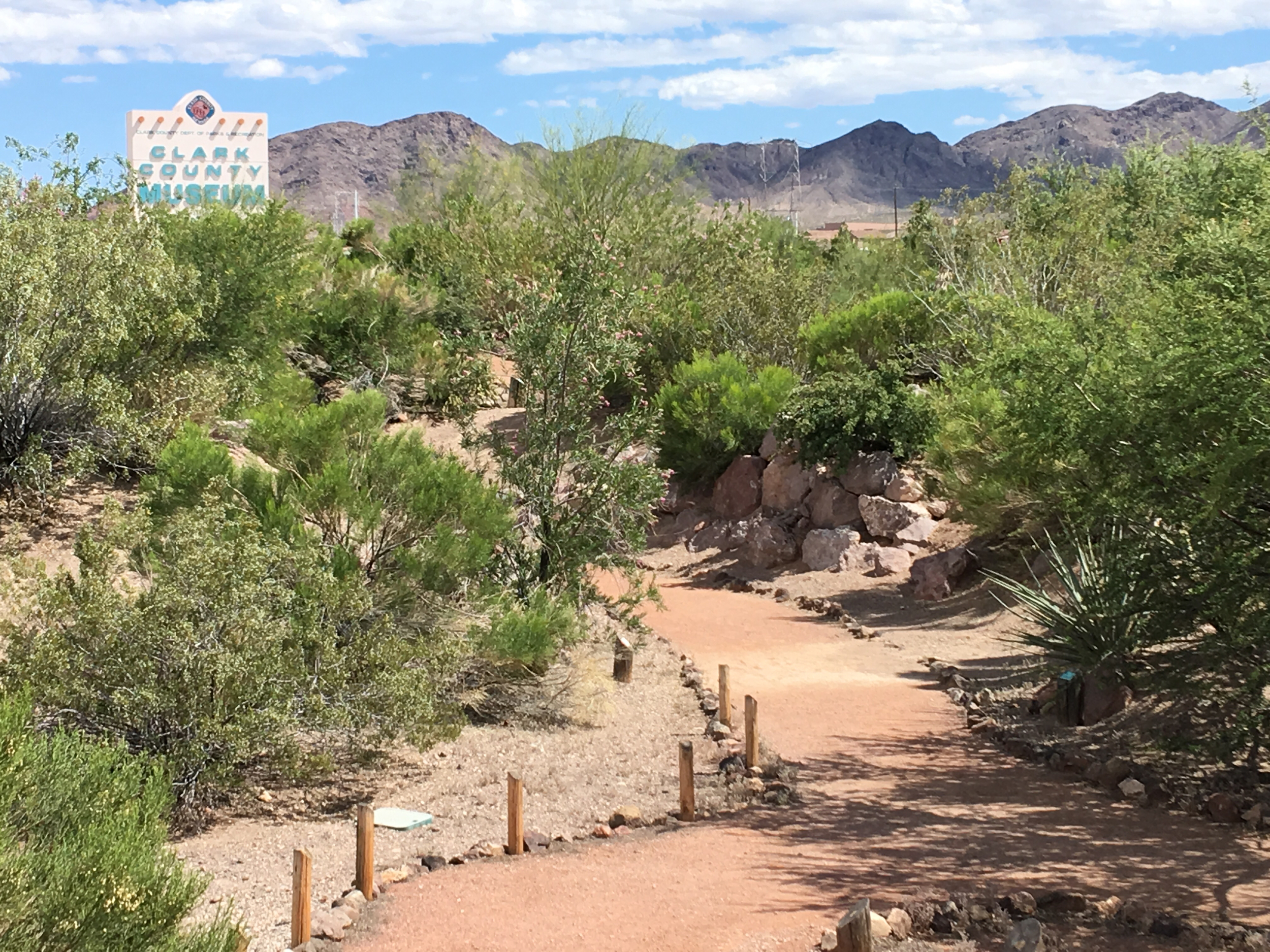
Along the walking paths connecting the museums outdoor exhibits and buildings, xeroscape landscaping features plants and trees native to the Mojave desert.

First opened as the Southern Nevada Museum, the museum began with the estate of Anna Roberts Parks, a Las Vegas mortician and avid collector, containing a vast assortment of cultural and natural history artifacts. Following her death in 1962, her daughter sought a permanent home for the collection, and local historian Maryellen Vallier Sadovich joined efforts to secure community support. The Henderson Chamber of Commerce became a primary sponsor and in April 1968 the institution opened in a converted school gymnasium in downtown Henderson near Water Street.

The original facility soon proved inadequate, and the city of Henderson donated land along Boulder Highway for a permanent site. In 1974 the museum relocated the Boulder City railroad depot to its grounds, marking the beginning of its outdoor historic district. By the end of the 1970s, financial challenges led Clark County to assume direct administration, and the institution was renamed the Clark County Museum. Under county oversight the museum expanded its collections and programs. By the end of the 1990s, it had become a prominent center for historic preservation for the Southern Nevada region.

== Exhibits ==
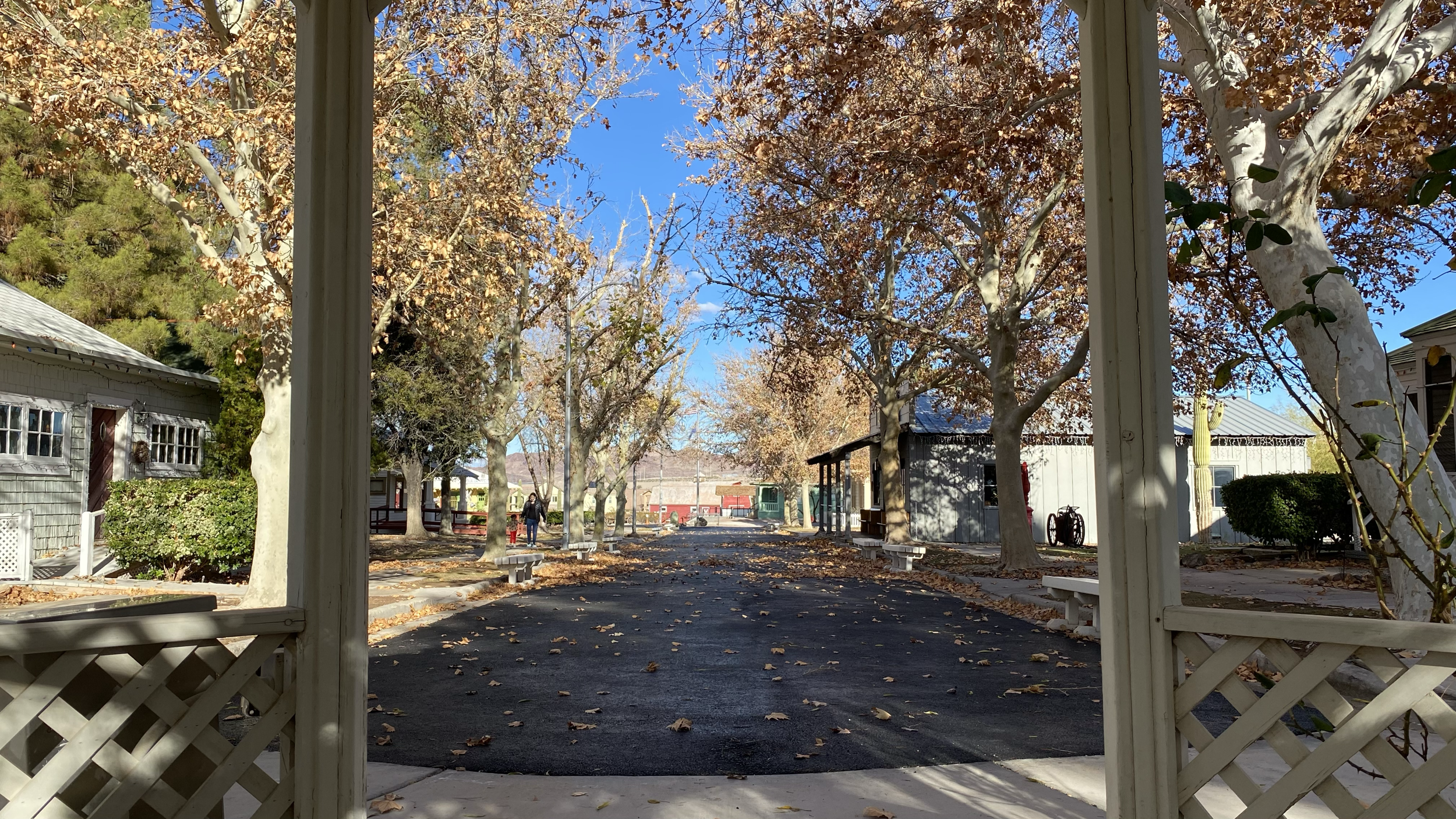
A view of several of the buildings adjacent the main hall of the museum.

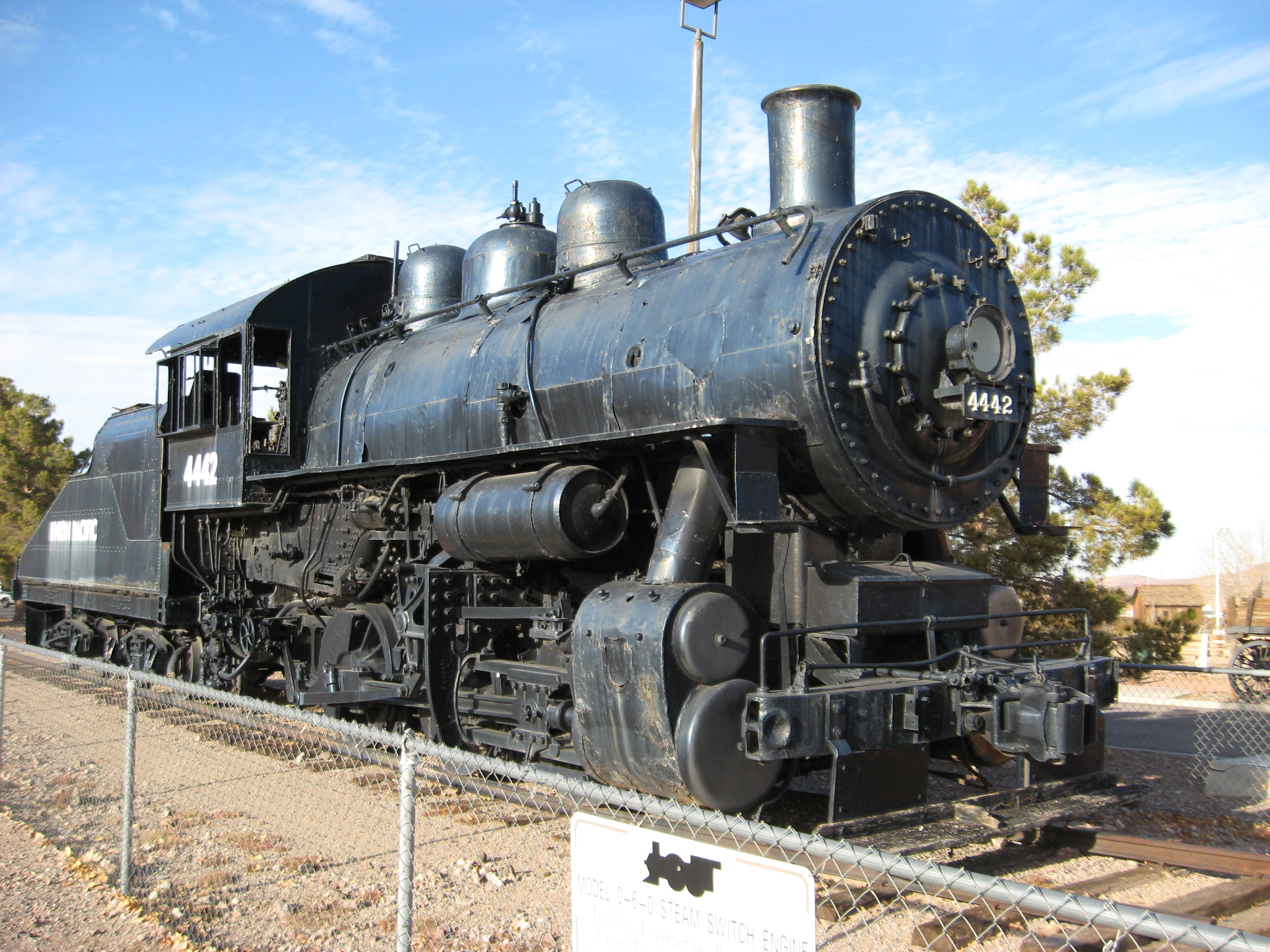
One of the outdoor exhibits featuring an historical steam engine used in early Southern Nevada history.

At the center of the property is the Anna Roberts Parks Exhibit Hall, which presents a chronological narrative of Southern Nevada history. The displays cover subjects including Native American cultures (especially Southern Paiute and Pueblo peoples), regional mining history, the railroad era, Hoover Dam construction, the development of Henderson as an industrial town, and the rise of the Las Vegas gaming industry. Dioramas, multimedia elements, and interactive stations are employed to illustrate historical themes, while artifacts range from prehistoric tools to early slot machines and railroad equipment.

Beyond the exhibit hall, the museum maintains Heritage Street, an assemblage of historic buildings relocated from communities across southern Nevada. The structures, dating from the early 20th century through the mid-century suburban era, have been restored and furnished to represent different periods in the region's development. Visitors can enter the buildings, many of which include interpretive audio tours and period-appropriate artifacts. The outdoor campus also features the restored Boulder City Depot, vintage railcars and locomotives, mining equipment, ghost town structures, and interpretive trails. The museum's broad collection of materials attempts to summarize a holistic Clark County and the surrounding region.

The museum also hosts lectures, community events, and temporary exhibitions.

In 2025 it presented a program on the 1969 Historic Westside uprising in Las Vegas, demonstrating its continuing role in connecting historical scholarship with contemporary civic dialogue.

== See also ==
- Museums in Las Vegas
- Museums in Clark County, Nevada
- History of Las Vegas
- Timeline of Las Vegas
