= Anthem, Henderson =

Coordinates: 35.964°N 115.090°W

Anthem
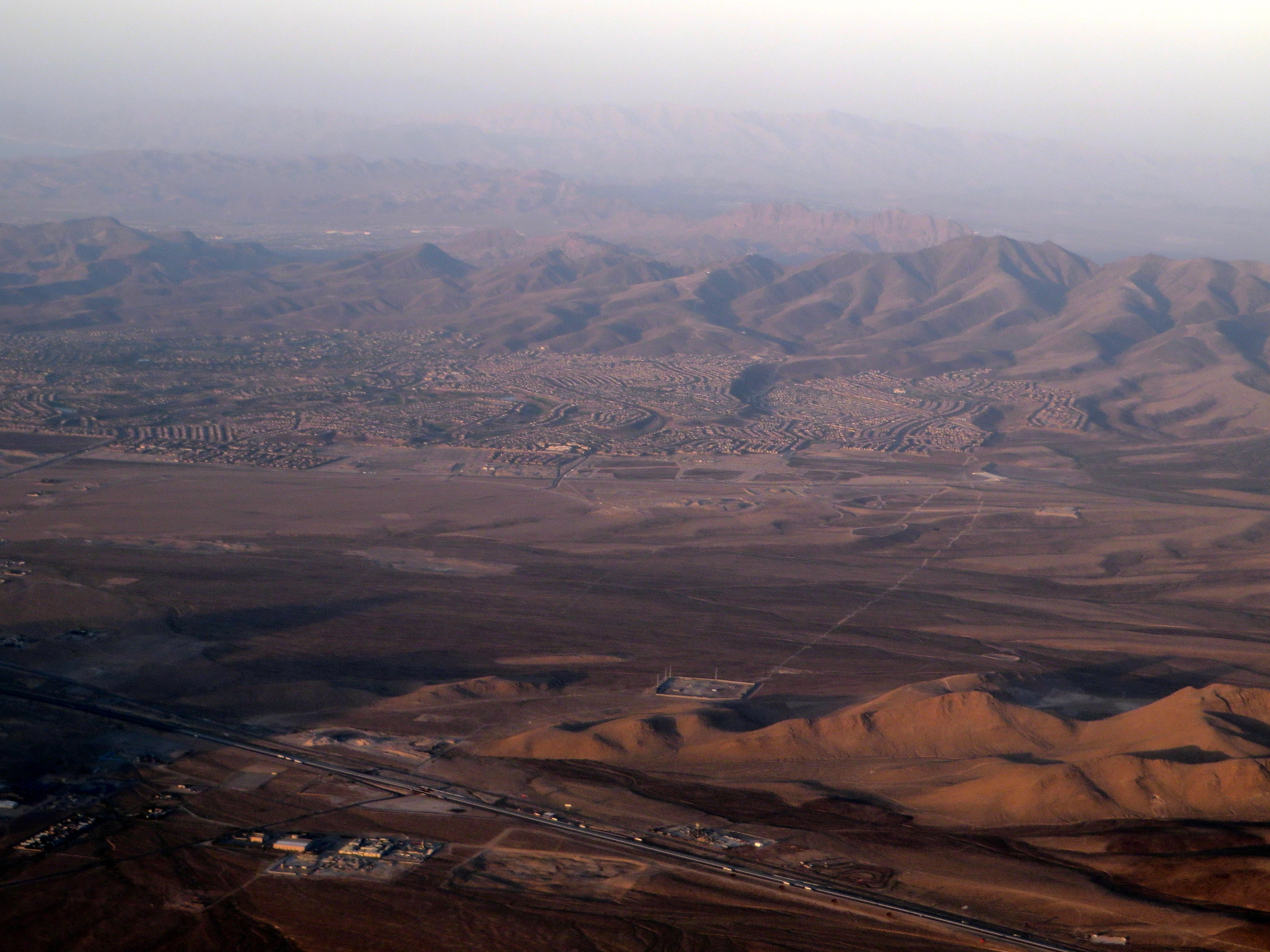
- Anthem in 2014
- Interactive map of Anthem
- Country: United States
- State: Nevada
- Counties: Clark
- City: Henderson
- Area: Las Vegas Valley
- ZIP code: 89052, 89044
- Area codes: 702, 725

Anthem is a master-planned community in Henderson, Nevada, part of the Las Vegas Valley. It was developed by Del Webb Corporation and opened in 1998.

== History ==
Anthem was developed by Del Webb Corporation. In November 1997, Henderson, Nevada approved the first phase of Anthem by annexing 2,535 acres (1,026 ha) of vacant land into the city. Del Webb acquired the land through a property swap with the Bureau of Land Management (BLM), and the annexation had been in the planning for two years prior to its approval. Del Webb planned to start preparing the site for construction by the end of 1997. Anthem was expected to take 15 to 20 years to fully build out. The development project would include a country club community and a Sun City senior community. Anthem would eventually consist of 11,000 to 13,000 homes. Approximately 72 acres of the first phase were set aside for parks and recreation.

Henderson ensured that its water supply would meet the future needs of the new community. As part of the annexation agreement, Del Webb and property owners would be responsible for projects such as the paving of roads and the installation of sewer lines and utilities. Del Webb would also pay to build a fire station, and worked with the Clark County School District to locate a 20-acre site for the construction of a middle school.

By January 1998, the inspector general for the U.S. Department of the Interior was investigating the land swap deal after former and current BLM officials complained about it. The land was valued at $10,900 per acre, although critics of the deal said each acre was worth $36,000. The deal also raised questions about the involvement of Bruce Babbitt and senator Harry Reid, who both supported it. Babbitt, the Secretary of the Interior, had once represented Del Webb in efforts to acquire BLM land. Although Babbitt recused himself from the Anthem deal, he became involved with the project at a critical point when he ordered the BLM to prioritize the Anthem deal. At the time, other property exchange applications had been put on hold. In addition, Del Webb had previously held a fundraiser for Reid in 1994, although Reid said his support for the Anthem deal was unrelated to the fundraising.

The Anthem land was ultimately appraised at $12,210 per acre, although a retired appraiser challenged this figure, stating each acre was worth between $15,000 and $17,000, which would equal taxpayer losses ranging from $8 million to $24 million in undervalued appraisals. Del Webb and the BLM stated that critics did not take into consideration the $250 million infrastructure that Del Webb was putting into place on the land.

Anthem home sales began in mid-1998, and the community held its grand opening on October 24, 1998. Approximately 3,000 people attended, more than twice what was expected. Anthem consisted of three subdivisions: Anthem Country Club, Sun City Anthem, and Coventry Homes at Anthem. The latter subdivision was marketed as affordable housing. Sun City Anthem offered new residents free advice from professional home designers. At the time of opening, construction was nearing completion on two golf courses, and had begun on a 74,000 sq ft (6,900 m^{2}) recreation center. Upon completion in about 13 years, it was expected that Anthem would have 30,000 residents. The community would include retail and office space. Del Webb relocated its local administrative offices to Anthem in January 1999.

In February 1999, the Henderson Planning Commission approved plans for parts of Anthem, including its commercial subdivision. Anthem Country Club opened its golf course in April 1999, and received approval for residential units in August 1999. That year, Del Webb transferred ownership of 147 acres of Lake Tahoe land, including the Thunderbird Lodge, to the BLM. In exchange, Del Webb received an additional 2,535 acres for the Anthem project, for a total of more than 5,000.

A year after opening, Del Webb had sold more than 1,000 homes in Anthem. Sun City Anthem had 660 residents, while Anthem Country Club had approximately 200 residents and 100 golf members. During 2000 and 2001, Anthem was the sixth-best-selling master-planned community in the United States. Anthem was ranked fifth for 2005, but did not make the top 10 list in 2006.

== Demographics ==
It has a median household income of $115,612.

== Education ==
- Frank J. Lamping Elementary School
- Elise L. Wolff Elementary School
- Shirley and Bill Wallin Elementary a School
- Del E. Webb Middle School
- Coronado High School
- Liberty High School

The neighborhood is served by the Clark County School District. The schools above are the schools serving all of the Anthem community. There are also multiple private schools in the surrounding area including The Henderson International School, Challenger School, and Hillcrest Academy.
