= The Cliff (Henderson) =

Coordinates: 36.01994°N 115.09887°W

The Cliff is an under construction retail development located in Henderson, Nevada, within the Las Vegas metropolitan area, developed by Partners Capital and Cast Capital Partners.

The development is expected to cost about $100 million. It is described as an "urban outdoor lifestyle center" and a "design-forward lifestyle and entertainment destination". It is intended to reuse 10 acres of unused office space at 2500-2550 Paseo Verde Parkway in Green Valley Ranch. The project was approved by the city council in 2025, and construction began in 2026.
