= Acacia Demonstration Gardens =

Public park in Henderson, Nevada

Coordinates: 36.0304°N 115.0153°W

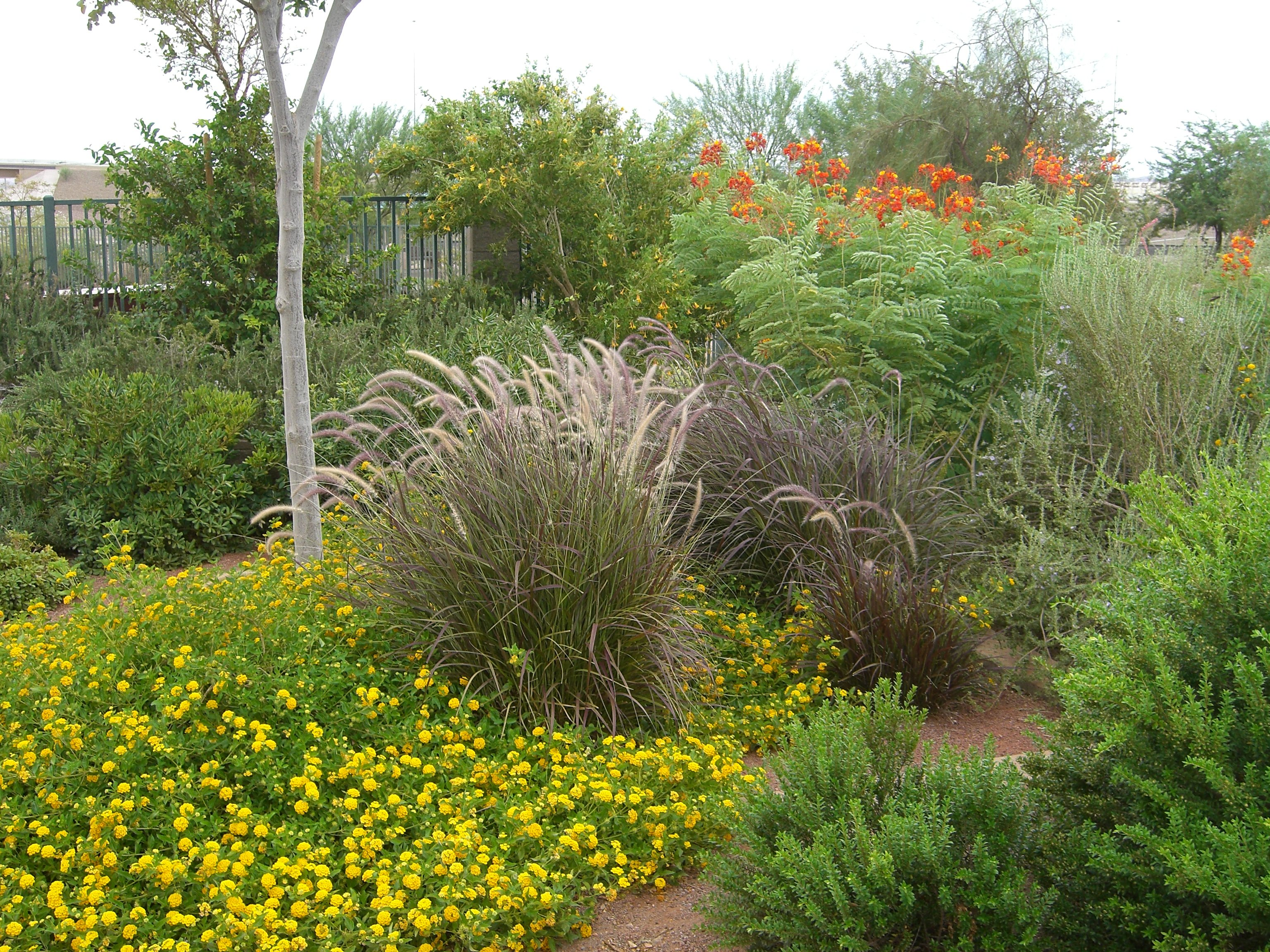
Some plants in the Acacia Demonstration Gardens

The Acacia Demonstration Gardens is a public park in Henderson, Nevada that features many examples of how to landscape in a dry desert climate. The park was built by the Conservation District Southern Nevada in coordination with the City of Henderson.

== Demonstration Gardens ==
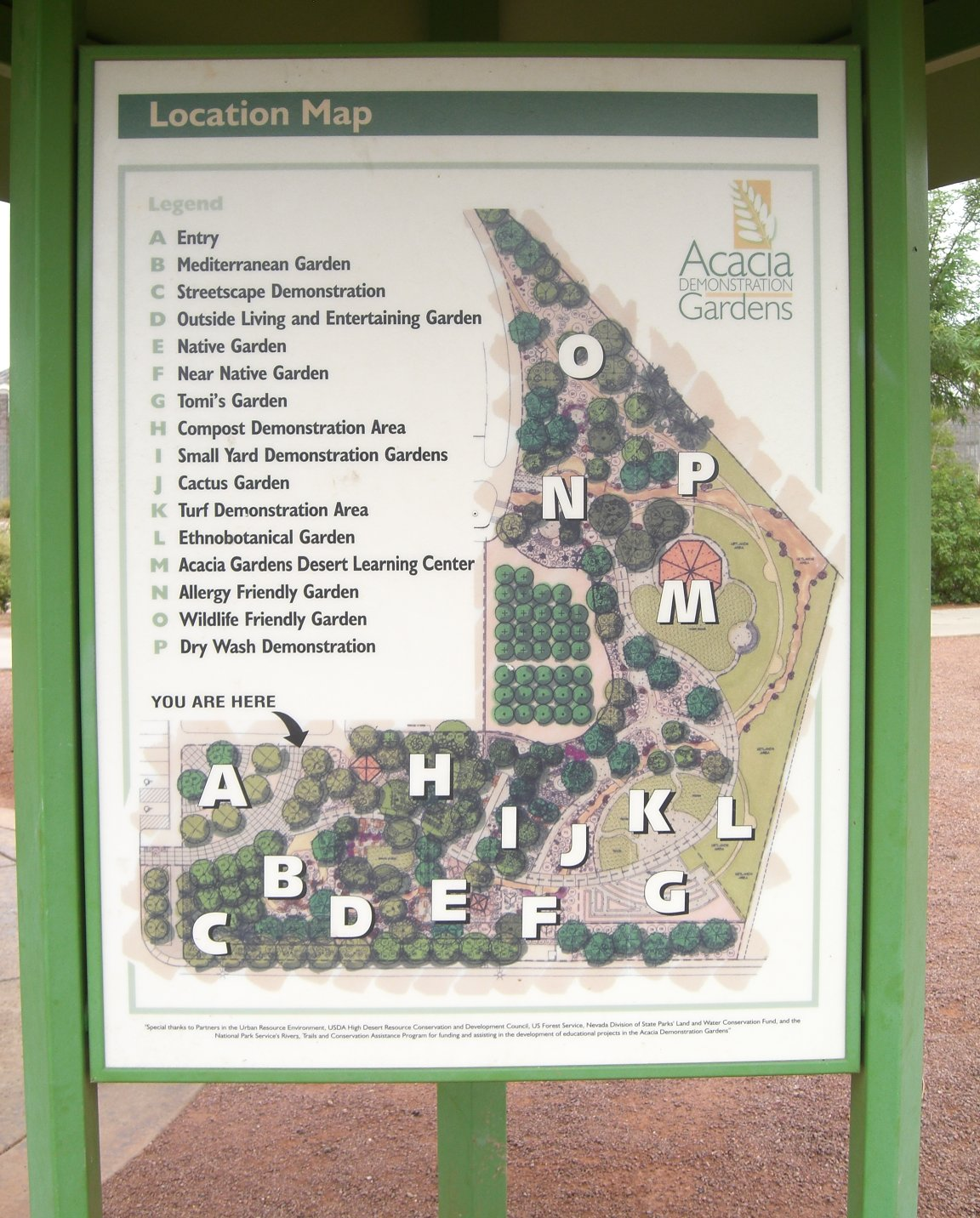
Official map of Acacia Demonstration Gardens

- Allergy Friendly Garden
- Cactus Garden
- Compost Demonstration Area
- Dry Wash Demonstration
- Ethnobotanical Garden
- Mediterranean Garden
- Native Garden
- Near Native Garden
- Outside Living and Entertaining Garden
- Small Yard Demonstration Gardens
- Streetscape Demonstration
- Tomi's Garden - In Memory of Nanyu Tomiyasu
- Turf Demonstration Area
- Wildlife Friendly Garden

== Other features ==
Near the gardens are other park features, including:

- Water park playground for children
- Soccer field
- Baseball field
- Dog park
