= MacDonald Highlands =

- Neighborhood of Henderson
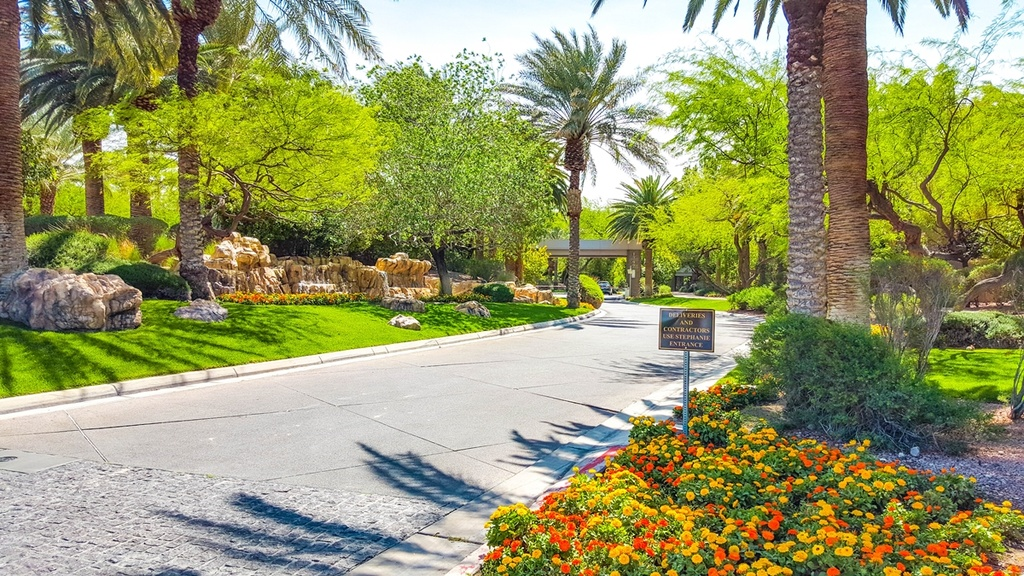
- The west entrance to MacDonald Highlands, at Horizon Ridge Parkway.
- Interactive map of MacDonald Highlands
- Coordinates: 36.010531°N 115.045603°W
- State: Nevada
- County: Clark
- City: Henderson
- Mountain Range: Black Mountain

The MacDonald Highlands are a series of residential neighborhoods in Henderson, Nevada in the foothills of Black Mountain. The community is part of the greater Las Vegas Valley.

The community is situated approximately 15 miles (25 km) from the Las Vegas Strip and 20 miles (32 km) from downtown Las Vegas. It sits on the edges of the McCullough Mountains and overlooks much of Henderson and the Las Vegas Valley.

It is a guard-gated community and is home to DragonRidge Country Club, which opened in 2000. MacDonald Highlands is bordered by the communities of Del Webb to the west, The Canyons to the southwest, McCullough Hills to the northeast and west, and Green Valley Ranch to the northwest. MacDonald Highlands is also adjacent to the neighborhoods of Ascaya and Roma Hills.

Notable residents include Andrew Cherng, Nancy Walton Laurie, SSSniperWolf, and Oscar De La Hoya. Anthony Hsieh, founder of mortgage firm LoanDepot, purchased a newly built home for $25 million in 2021, but later sold the residence.

== See also ==
- Southern Highlands Golf Club
