= Reflection Bay Golf Club =

Golf club in Nevada

Coordinates: 36.1101°N 114.9258°W

- Interactive map of Reflection Bay Golf Club

Club information
- Location: Henderson, Nevada

Reflection Bay Golf Club is located in Henderson, Nevada, United States. It is a public resort golf course in Nevada personally designed by Jack Nicklaus and built in 1998.

It hosts the Wendy's 3-Tour Challenge tournament benefiting the Dave Thomas Foundation for Adoption.

The Par- 72 course goes back to 7,261-yard and makes its way through the desert while providing views of Lake Las Vegas.

In 2022, Reflection Bay Golf Club used 383,088,000 gallons of water. In 2023, they closed for renovations from May 2023 to Sept 2023 to put down new surface green.
