= Seven Hills, Henderson, Nevada =

Seven Hills
- Neighborhood of Henderson
- Location within Nevada
- Coordinates: 35.985149°N 115.121112°W,
- State: Nevada
- County: Clark
- City: Henderson
- ZIP Code: 89052
- Area code: 702

Seven Hills is a master-planned community located in Henderson, Nevada.

Seven Hills is approximately 7 miles (11 km) from the Las Vegas Strip. It is home to the Rio Secco Golf Club. Seven Hills is located half of a mile east of the Henderson Executive Airport.

== History ==
A community on the property was initially proposed in the mid-1980s, known as Sky Harbor Ranch, with Japan-based Cosmo World Corporation as the developer. The community's name subsequently changed to Cosmo World, and later to Silver Canyon. The project was cancelled in 1991, when Cosmo World filed for bankruptcy. Forest City Enterprises, in partnership with Canadian developer Terry Johnston, purchased the site in 1993. In January 1996, American Nevada Corporation became a partner in the project, with Forest City remaining as the managing partner and American Nevada becoming the development manager. Development was in progress by April 1996, with site preparations and negotiations with home-builders both underway. Completion of the entire community was expected six to seven years later.

A 1,940-acre (7.9 km^{2}) parcel southwest of Seven Hills was sold in 2004 for $557 million. Labeled as 'Inspirada', the area became a high-density one-lane neighborhood kept as separate area with no interconnecting roads.

== Schools ==
- Elise L. Wolff Elementary School (2001)
- Glen C. Taylor Elementary School (2003)
- Del E. Webb Middle School (2005)
- Henderson International School (2005)
- Bob Miller Middle School (1999)
- Coronado High School (2001)

== Notable people ==
- Bryce Harper
- Pierre Omidyar
- Mike Tyson

== See also ==
- Seven hills (disambiguation)
