= Henderson, Nevada =

Henderson
- City
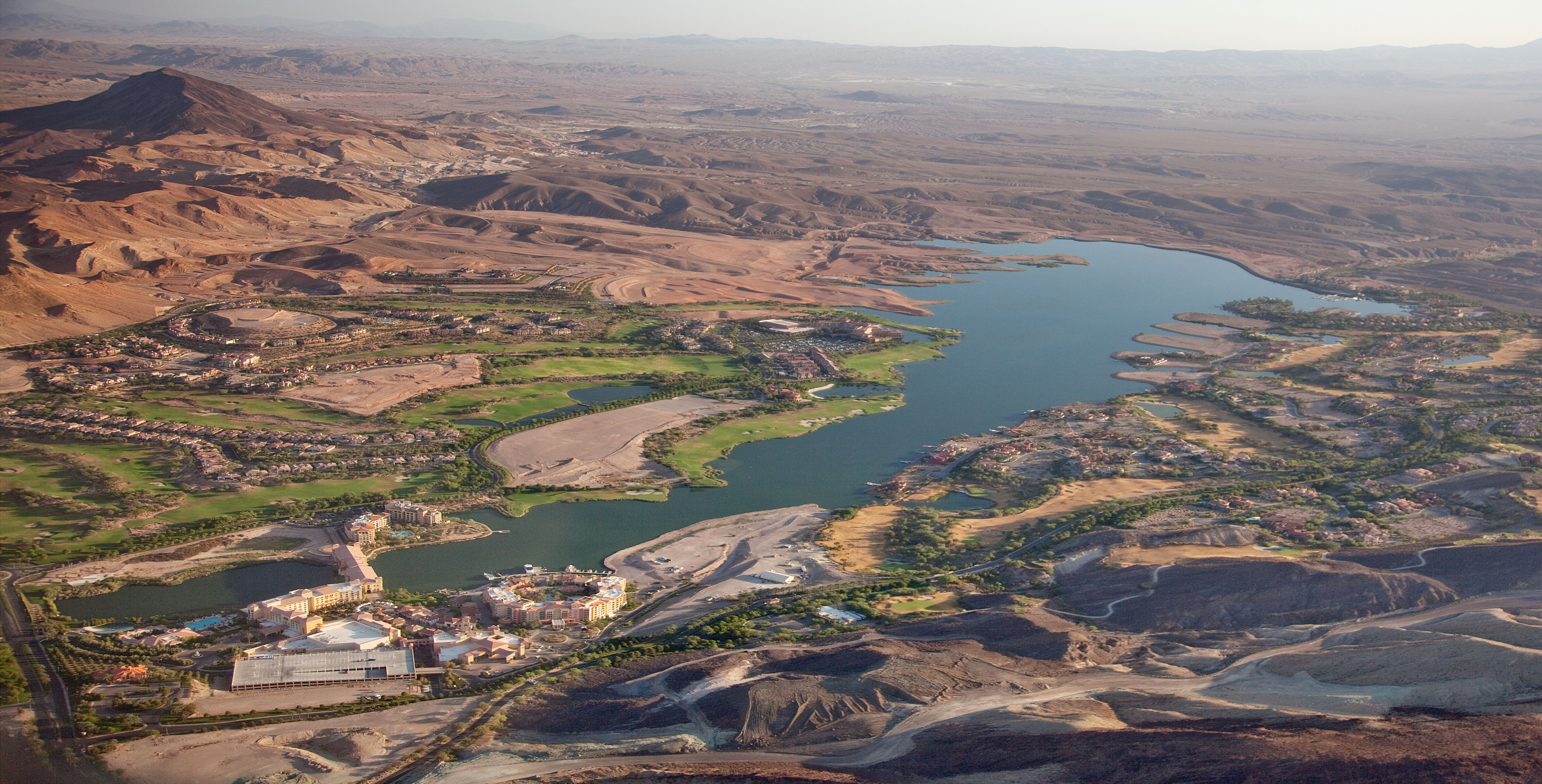
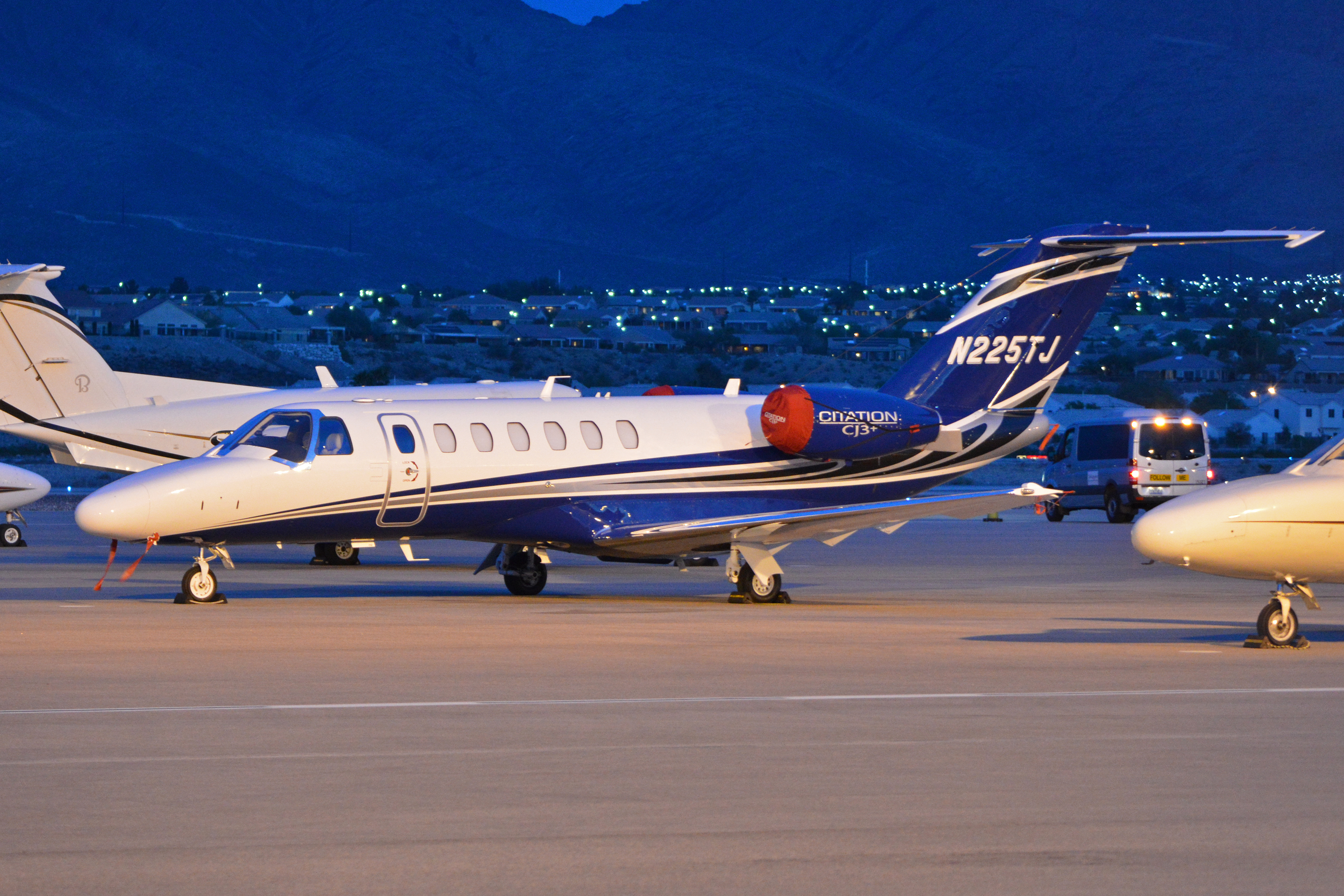
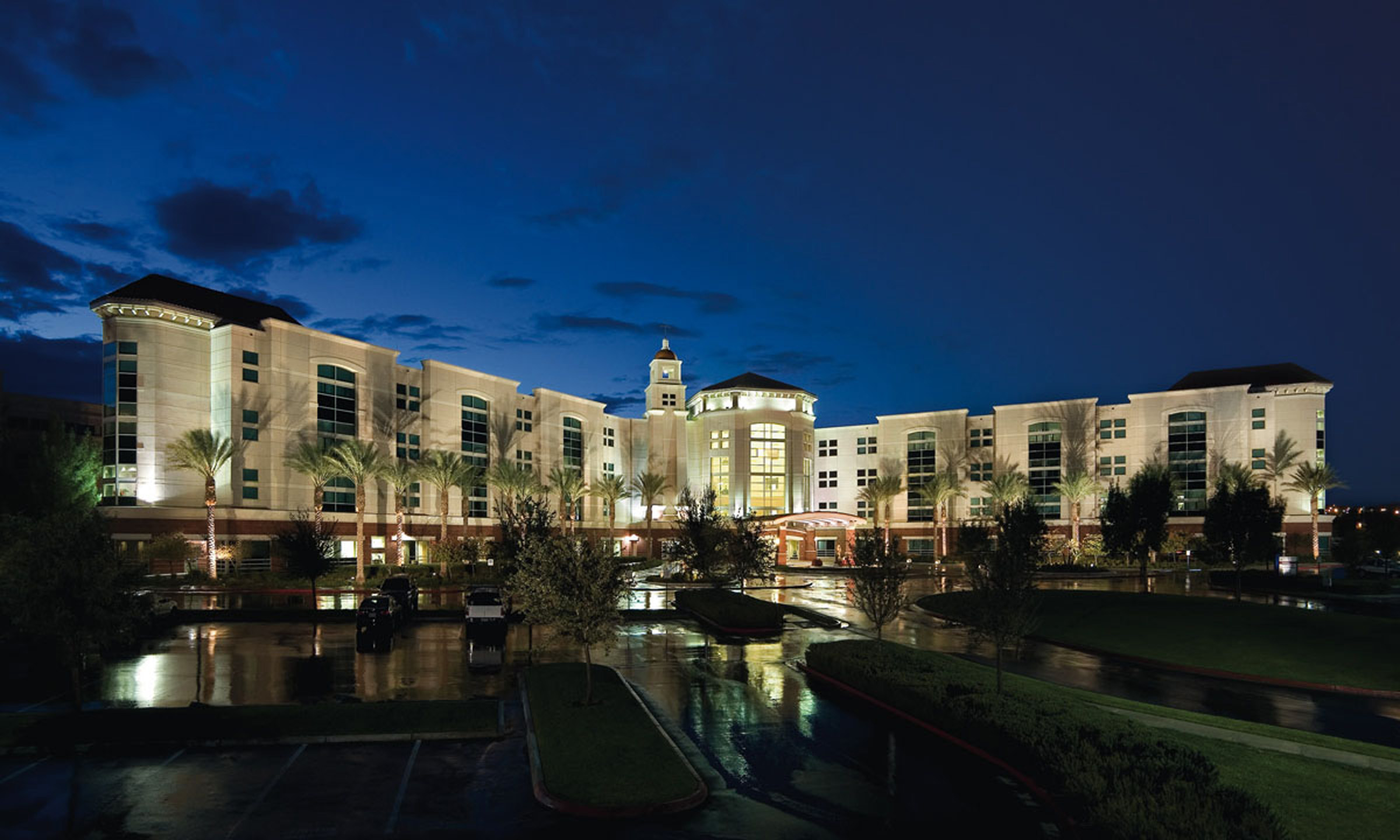
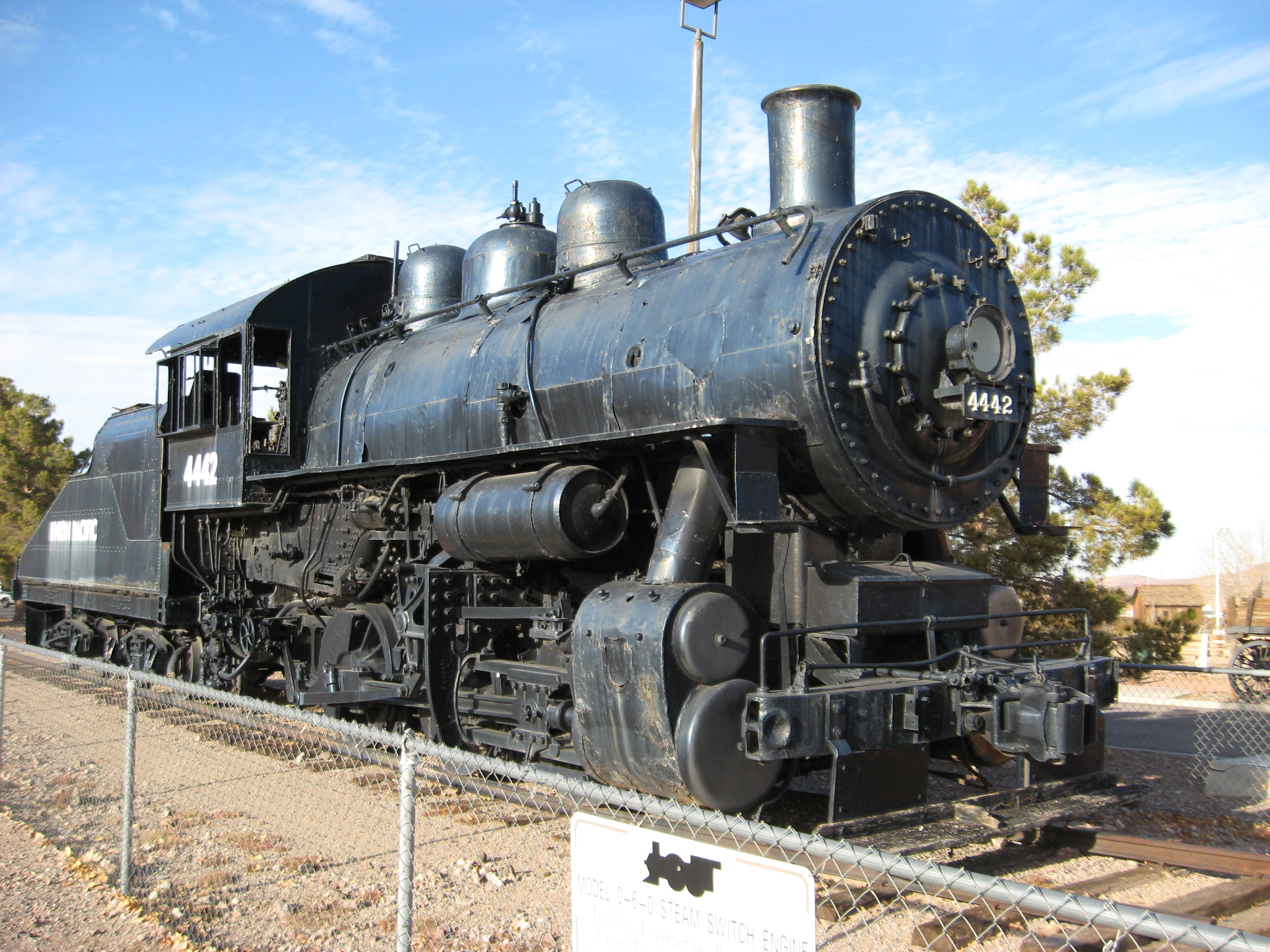
- Left-right from top: Lake Las Vegas, Henderson Executive Airport, The District at Green Valley Ranch, St. Rose Dominican Hospital, Ethel M Chocolate Botanical Gardens, Clark County Heritage Museum

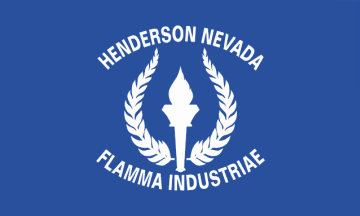
- Flag Seal Logo
- Motto: A Place to Call Home
- Location within Clark County

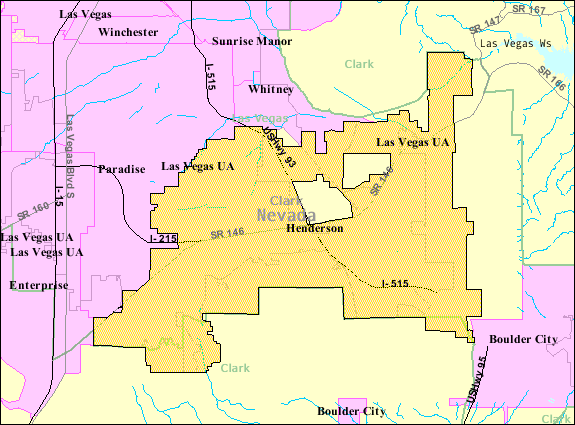
- U.S. Census map

- Location within Nevada Location within the United States
- Coordinates: 36°2′N 114°59′W
- Country: United States
- State: Nevada
- County: Clark
- Founded: 1941; 85 years ago
- Incorporated: April 16, 1953; 73 years ago
- Named for: Charles Henderson

Government
  - Type: Council–manager/CEO
  - Mayor: Michelle Romero (R)
  - City manager/CEO: Stephanie Garcia Vause

Area
  - Total: 106.93 sq mi (276.94 km^{2})
  - Land: 106.43 sq mi (275.66 km^{2})
  - Water: 0.49 sq mi (1.27 km^{2})
- Elevation: 1,867 ft (569 m)

Population (2020)
  - Total: 317,610
  - Estimate (2025): 353,289 ▲
  - Rank: 55th in the United States
  - Density: 2,984.1/sq mi (1,152.16/km^{2})
- Time zone: UTC−8 (PST)
  - Summer (DST): UTC−7 (PDT)
- ZIP Codes: 89002, 89009, 89011, 89012, 89014–89016, 89044, 89052, 89053, 89074, 89077
- Area codes: 702 and 725
- FIPS code: 32-31900
- Website: www.cityofhenderson.com

Henderson is a city in Clark County, Nevada, United States, about 16 miles (26 km) southeast of Las Vegas. It is the 2nd most populous city in Nevada, after Las Vegas, with 317,610 residents as of the 2020 census. The city is part of the Las Vegas Valley metropolitan area.

Henderson has an extensive system of outdoor recreation facilities, including over 220 miles (350 km) of trails and 72 parks.

Incorporated in 1953, Henderson was originally known for its role in magnesium production during World War II. Since then, it has grown rapidly through the development of master planned communities starting with the large Green Valley neighborhood, redevelopment and reinvestment after the PEPCON disaster, and the city government's historically proactive planning and management.

== History ==
=== 1913 to the Hoover Dam ===
In the fall of 1917, manganese ore along with other metals were found at the site of the Three Kids Mine, a now-defunct mine adjacent to the Lake Las Vegas area 8 miles (13 km) northwest of Boulder City and 15 miles (24 km) southeast of Las Vegas. Mining would continue intermittently until the mine was officially closed in 1961.

Instead, there were clusters of Hoovervilles scattered throughout the area with a variety of names. Pittman, the most prominent settlement of what would become Henderson, still exists today —though not incorporated nor a city—was the most prominent of the settlements and is currently known, many of which remain neighborhood names today.

=== World War II growth ===
In an effort to supply the Allies in World War II, the federal government needed vast quantities of magnesium for the war. Mined from Gabbs, Nevada, the ore needed to be processed in order to produce a variety of critical war materials, such as airplane engines, fuselages, and incendiary munitions casing.

The area was chosen to build a two-mile long industrial complex to house the company chosen to run the operation, Basic Magnesium Incorporated (BMI), which would go on to have a massive impact on the development of Henderson.

The War Department identified the area as being ideal for military industrial manufacturing. The area was at least 250 miles from the coast in between the McCullough Hills and River Mountains, protecting the area from low-altitude aircraft attacks. The area is also roughly halfway between the railroad line connecting Las Vegas to Los Angeles and Salt Lake and the Hoover Dam's water and electricity.

In September 1941, around 2,700 workers began construction of the BMI complex in order to complete it in just 11 months. When the plant opened in February 1942, around 15,000 people would come from around the country to come work at the plant. At its peak, it would produce 25% of the nation's magnesium. In between the preexisting communities of Pittman and Midway, what is now downtown Henderson was referred to as the Basic Townsite.

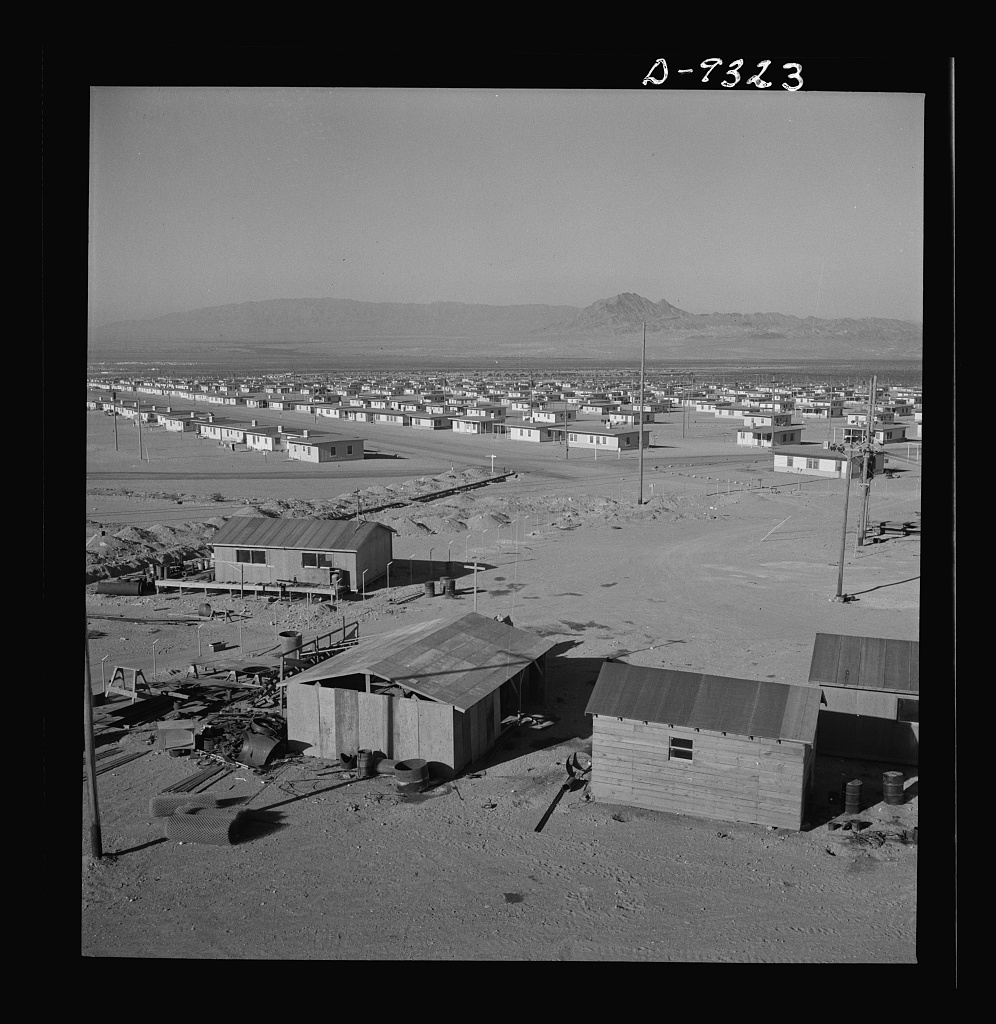
The first permanent houses in Henderson being built to house Basic Magnesium workers

During this time, the first high school in Henderson and second in Clark County, Basic High School, was established in 1942. The school has moved twice, once in the 1950s and again in 1972 to its current location. The school has a large, white letter "B" made of painted boulders on the side of the River Mountain range.

=== Incorporation ===
By the end of World War II, Henderson suffered a sharp decline when the BMI plant ceassed production, with most of its 14,000 employees leaving with their families. With the sharp population decline, Henderson's future was uncertain and the state government was looking to public and private sectors to repurpose infrastructure. In 1946, the Nevada Legislature authorized the Colorado River Commission of Nevada to purchase the industrial plants, preventing the town's dissolution.

This intervention paved the way for the city of Henderson to exist. Henderson was officially incorporated as a city on April 16, 1953, with a population of 7,500 and Dr. Jim French serving as its first mayor.

=== Post-war growth to 1980s ===
Despite its proximity to Las Vegas, Henderson maintained a distinct identity throughout the 1960s and 1970s, with slower rates of development and a priority placed on developing single-family homes, retail, and manufacturing industries. Land continued to be developed independently across Henderson, in particular expanding around the former towns of Pittman and Midway City, as well as near the Water Street District and the area east of Boulder Highway and south of Lake Mead Boulevard.

In 1971, a land sale involving KLAS-TV founder and Las Vegas Sun publisher, Hank Greenspun, caused controversy but resulted in the development of the first neighborhoods outside the original downtown, Green Valley. Greenspun acquired 4,720 acres of government-released land directly in between Las Vegas and downtown Henderson at approximately $280 per acre, a low price which drew criticism.

Throughout the 1960s into the 1980s, the Green Valley development encouraged growth with other master-planned communities following suit including other early-built developments including MacDonald Highlands in the 1970s, the Fountains in 1988, Seven Hills in 1996, and Anthem in 1988.

=== PEPCON disaster and aftermath ===
On May 4, 1988, the Pacific Engineering and Production Company of Nevada (PEPCON) chemical plant had a catastrophic fire and series of massive explosions. The facility was one of only two in the United States producing ammonium perchlorate, a key component in solid rocket fuel.

The disaster resulted in two fatalities, injured over 300 individuals, and caused extensive damage throughout Henderson. The explosions were so powerful and massive that they registered seismic activity equivalent to a 3.5 magnitude earthquake and were felt up to 10 miles away.

The incident led to significant changes in industrial safety regulations and emergency response protocols. In the aftermath of the disaster, PEPCON ceased operations in Henderson, and the site was eventually redeveloped into a mix of commercial use and business parks.

== Geography ==
Henderson is about 16 miles (26 km) southeast of Las Vegas has a total land area of 106.7 square miles (276 km^{2}).

Situated in the Las Vegas Valley, a large basin the Mojave Desert, Henderson is within the Colorado River watershed by way of the Las Vegas Wash. Occupying the southeast quadrant of the larger valley, all of Henderson is atop the piedmonts of the McCullough Range and River Mountains.

River Mountains between Henderson and Boulder City.

Because the piedmonts are coextensive with complex alluvial fans, also called bajadas, significant damage due to flash flooding during the summer monsoon is possible. During the 20th century, major floods in September 1952, June 1954, July 1955, July 1974 were noted for causing extensive property damage and temporary, but major disruptions to daily life.

To the north, Henderson is bounded by the unincorporated town of Whitney and by land managed by the Bureau of Land Management and the Bureau of Reclamation. That land includes two mountains, Frenchman Mountain and Sunrise Mountain, as well as the adjacent Rainbow Gardens ridge and Lava Butte.

The River Mountains and eastern Henderson.

To the east, Henderson is bounded by the River Mountains, which separate the city from Boulder City. The range is composed primarily of early-to-mid Miocene volcanic rock: lava flows and volcaniclastic breccias of dacite, andesite, and basalt, cut by numerous dikes. The site of the former Three Kids Mine lies south of Lake Mead Parkway, near where the Las Vegas Wash leaves the valley through the northern River Mountains on its way to Lake Mead.

To the southeast, Henderson borders Boulder City at Railroad Pass, which separates the River Mountains from the McCullough Range and connects the Las Vegas Valley with the neighboring Eldorado Valley. The concurrent Interstate 11 and U.S. Routes 93 and 95 run through the pass.

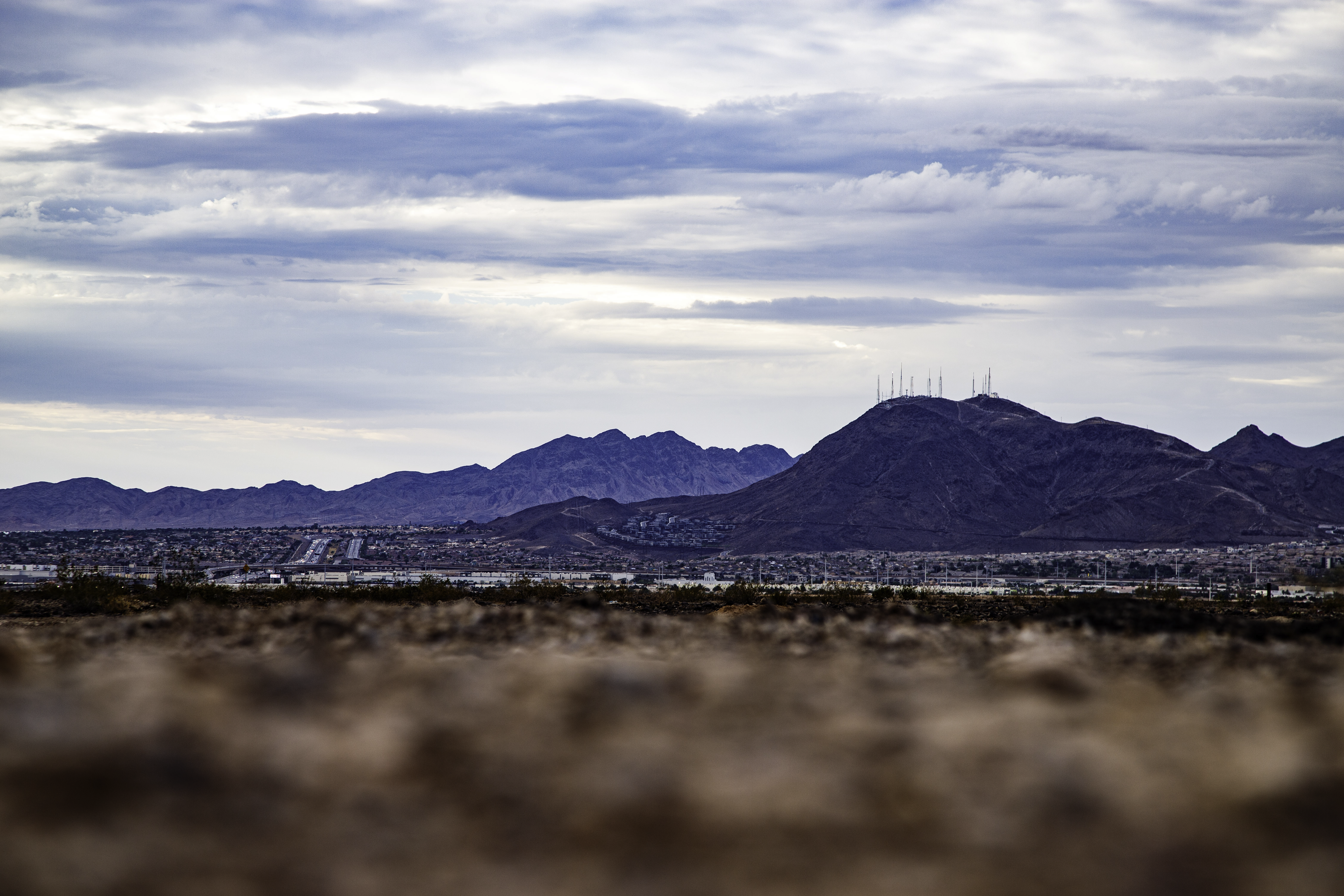
The north end of the McCullough Range and southeastern Henderson.

To the south, Henderson is bounded by the northern half of the McCullough Range. Much of it is protected within the 48,438 acres (19,602 ha) of Sloan Canyon National Conservation Area since 2002. The conservation area contains the North McCullough Wilderness and the Sloan Canyon Petroglyph Site, which has more than 300 rock art panels. Several of the range's peaks serve as important cultural landmarks. Black Mountain, at 5,093 feet (1,552 m), is the highest point in the northern half of the range. A separate, unnamed peak at the range's northeastern edge beside Interstate 11 carries many of the valley's broadcast transmission towers, and residents commonly mistake it for Black Mountain.

To the west, Henderson borders the unincorporated towns of Paradise to the northwest and Enterprise to the west, with Sloan to the southwest. Enterprise was formed in 1996 partly to prevent annexation by Henderson. In West Henderson, the city limits extend to Las Vegas Boulevard near St. Rose Parkway and the Sloan exit on Interstate 15.

Residential neighborhoods in Henderson include Anthem, Anthem Country Club, Ascaya, Black Mountain Vistas, Cadence, Calico Ridge, Champion Village, The Fountains, Grand Legacy, Green Valley, Green Valley Estates, Green Valley Ranch, Hillsboro Heights, Inspirada, Lake Las Vegas, MacDonald Highlands, MacDonald Ranch, Madeira Canyon, Club at Madeira Canyon, Roma Hills, Seven Hills, Sun City Anthem, Sun City MacDonald Ranch, Tuscany Village, and Whitney Ranch.

=== Climate ===
Henderson is classified as having a hot desert climate (BWh) in the Köppen climate classification. It has mild winters and hot summers. Snow can occasionally fall in the winter. The monsoon can bring storms in the summer, which can cause flash flooding and thunderstorms. The hottest month is July and the coldest month is December. On average there are 292 clear days per year.

Climate data for Henderson, Nevada
Month	Jan	Feb	Mar	Apr	May	Jun	Jul	Aug	Sep	Oct	Nov	Dec	Year
Record high °F (°C)	75 (24)	86 (30)	91 (33)	97 (36)	111 (44)	118 (48)	120 (49)	112 (44)	115 (46)	100 (38)	90 (32)	78 (26)	120 (49)
Mean daily maximum °F (°C)	54 (12)	59 (15)	67 (19)	75 (24)	85 (29)	95 (35)	101 (38)	99 (37)	91 (33)	78 (26)	64 (18)	54 (12)	77 (25)
Mean daily minimum °F (°C)	41 (5)	44 (7)	49 (9)	56 (13)	65 (18)	74 (23)	79 (26)	78 (26)	71 (22)	60 (16)	48 (9)	40 (4)	59 (15)
Record low °F (°C)	11 (−12)	12 (−11)	25 (−4)	31 (−1)	37 (3)	41 (5)	56 (13)	59 (15)	43 (6)	30 (−1)	4 (−16)	9 (−13)	4 (−16)
Average precipitation inches (mm)	0.70 (18)	0.96 (24)	0.57 (14)	0.23 (5.8)	0.11 (2.8)	0.11 (2.8)	0.46 (12)	0.72 (18)	0.42 (11)	0.36 (9.1)	0.49 (12)	0.60 (15)	5.73 (144.5)
Source: Weather.com

== Demographics ==
Historical population
Census	Pop.	Note	%±
1950	3,643		—
1960	12,525		243.8%
1970	16,395		30.9%
1980	24,363		48.6%
1990	64,942		166.6%
2000	175,381		170.1%
2010	257,729		47.0%
2020	317,610		23.2%
2025 (est.)	353,289	▲	11.2%
U.S. Decennial Census

=== 2020 census ===
According to the 2020 census, Henderson had a population of 317,610 residents, a just-over 23% increase from the 2010 census. The city's racial makeup was 66.4% White alone, 6.0% Black or African American alone, 0.8% American Indian and Alaska Native alone, 9.3% Asian alone, 0.7% Native Hawaiian and Pacific Islander alone, and 10.9% identifying as two or more races. Hispanic or Latino people of any race were 19.1% of the population, while 59.3% were non-Hispanic White.

There were 124,626 households, with an average household size of 2.54 individuals. Owner-occupied housing units accounted for 65.2% of all households, with a median value of $427,900. The median gross rent was $1,641.

The age distribution in 2020 was as follows: 4.9% under 5 years old, 21.4% under 18, and 20.0% aged 65 or older. The median age was 42.2 years. For every 100 females, there were 98.81 males.

Economically, the median household income was $85,311, with a per capita income of $46,882. Approximately 8.1% of the population lived below the poverty line.

Residents with at least a high school diploma accounted for 93.6% of the population, while residents with bachelor's degrees or higher accounted for 35.3%.

Henderson, Nevada – racial and ethnic composition Note: the US Census treats Hispanic/Latino as an ethnic category. This table excludes Latinos from the racial categories and assigns them to a separate category. Hispanics/Latinos may be of any race.
Race / ethnicity (NH = Non-Hispanic)	Pop 2000	Pop 2010	Pop 2020	% 2000	% 2010	% 2020
White (NH)	137,174	177,039	186,109	78.21%	68.69%	58.60%
Black or African American (NH)	6,376	12,471	20,288	3.64%	4.84%	6.39%
Native American or Alaska Native (NH)	955	1,182	1,253	0.54%	0.46%	0.39%
Asian (NH)	6,838	18,172	28,930	3.90%	7.05%	9.11%
Pacific Islander or Native Hawaiian (NH)	681	1,354	2,225	0.39%	0.53%	0.70%
Some other race (NH)	260	479	1,748	0.15%	0.19%	0.55%
Mixed-race or multiracial (NH)	4,312	8,655	20,093	2.46%	3.36%	6.33%
Hispanic or Latino (any race)	18,785	38,377	56,964	10.71%	14.89%	17.94%
Total	175,381	257,729	317,610	100.00%	100.00%	100.00%

=== 2010 census ===
At the census of 2010, 257,729 people resided in Henderson. The racial makeup was 76.9% White, 5.1% African American, 0.7% Native American, 7.2% Asian, 0.6% Pacific Islander, and 4.8% from two or more races. Hispanic or Latino people of any race were 14.9% of the population and 68.7% of the population was non-Hispanic White.

According to the 2000 census, there were 175,381 people, 66,331 households, and 47,095 families residing in the city. The population density was 2,200.8 inhabitants per square mile (849.7/km^{2}). There were 71,149 housing units at an average density of 892.8 per square mile (344.7/km^{2}). The city's racial makeup was 80.49% White, 3.76% African American, 0.70% Native American, 3.98% Asian, 0.42% Pacific Islander, 3.16% from other races, and 3.49% from two or more races. Hispanic or Latino people of any race were 13.71% of the population.

There were 66,331 households, out of which 33.0% had children under the age of 18 living with them, 56.4% were married couples living together, 10.0% had a female householder with no husband present, and 29.0% were non-families. 20.3% of all households were made up of individuals, and 5.0% had someone living alone who was 65 years of age or older. The average household size was 2.63 and the average family size was 3.05.

In the city, the population was spread out, with 25.1% under the age of 18, 7.9% from 18 to 24, 32.5% from 25 to 44, 24.4% from 45 to 64, and 10.1% who were 65 years of age or older. The median age for the city was 36 years. For every 100 females, there were 98.4 males. For every 100 females age 18 and over, there were 96.4 males.

The city's median household income was $63,830, and the median family income was $74,120. The per capita income for the city was $33,238. About 3.9% of families and 5.6% of the population were below the poverty line, including 6.4% of those under age 18 and 4.7% of those age 65 or over.

== Economy ==
The largest single employer in Henderson is the city government itself, with 3,524 full-time equivalent employees. Other large employers include Barclays, Green Valley Ranch, Sunset Station, Amazon, the Las Vegas Raiders, and Dignity Health, which operates two hospital campuses in Henderson.

In 2023, the city released a report to identify areas for public policy improvement to support the city economy's primary industries, including: logistics, electric equipment and components manufacturing, financial and credit services, media and sports production, and back-office management and support services. Overall, the city attracts more advanced industries than its Southern Nevada counterparts such as Las Vegas, North Las Vegas, and Boulder City since Henderson has more bachelor's and master's degree-holding residents per capita.

=== Manufacturing ===
TIMET, one of the largest manufacturers of titanium in the world, operates a facility in Henderson that produces titanium sponge and titanium tetrachloride, employing approximately 600 people.

Levi Strauss operates a 620,000-square-foot (58,000 m^{2}) manufacturing and distribution facility in Henderson, where it utilizes advanced laser technology to create custom-designed denim products. This facility allows for the production of personalized designs at a rapid pace.

Haas Automation, a leading manufacturer of computerized numerical control machines, began constructing a major production facility in Henderson in 2024. The new facility will cover 2,400,000 square feet (220,000 m^{2}) and is expected to employ up to 1,400 people over five years.

ProCaps Laboratories, a vitamin manufacturing company, operates a 90,000-square-foot (8,400 m^{2}) facility in Henderson. The facility includes a unique 1,400-square-foot (130 m^{2}) glass-enclosed broadcast studio that enables live broadcasting while production continues uninterrupted. This arrangement is a first-of-its-kind setup in the U.S. for a vitamin production facility.

=== IT networking infrastructure ===
Google's $600 million data center in Henderson operates on a 64-acre (260,000 m^{2}) campus. This facility supports Google's network infrastructure Google Cloud, AI, Maps, Search in North America. In addition to the initial investment, Google announced plans to invest an additional $400 million in 2024 to upgrade its Nevada data centers, including the one in Henderson.

=== Logistics ===
Amazon operates multiple facilities in Henderson. Among them is a 600,000-square-foot (56,000 m^{2}) cross-dock facility that enables efficient redistribution of large inventory shipments. The facility employs over 1,000 workers and is one of three Amazon fulfillment centers in Nevada.

The Las Vegas Raiders maintain their corporate headquarters and a healthcare performance center in Henderson. The facility features a 336,000-square-foot (31,200 m^{2}) complex with training fields and administrative offices.

Kroger operates a major distribution center in Henderson, which supports grocery operations throughout the region. The 428,000-square-foot (39,800 m^{2}) facility employs around 270 people and serves as a vital logistics hub for the company's network of stores.

Ethel M Chocolates, established by Forrest Mars Sr., has been a part of Henderson's economic fabric since 1981. The facility produces gourmet chocolates and offers a popular tourist attraction with its cactus garden and interactive experiences.

=== Top employers ===
West Henderson Hospital, part of the Valley Health System, is a constituent of the largest employers in Henderson.

Although ranges are given in order to protect employee privacy, according to the city of Henderson Comprehensive Annual Financial Report, fiscal year ending June 30, 2024, identifies the city's largest employers as:

Top single employers, Henderson, NV (2024)
#	Employer	# of employees
1	City of Henderson	3,527
2	Barclays Services, LLC	1,000–4,999
3	Green Valley Ranch Resort & Spa	1,000–4,999
4	St. Rose Dominican Hospital, Siena	1,000–4,999
5	Sunset Station Hotel and Casino	1,000–4,999
6	Amazon LAS1 Distribution Center	1,000–4,999
7	Henderson Hospital	1,000–4,999
8	M Resort, Spa, Casino	1,000–4,999
9	St. Rose Dominican Hospital, de Lima	500–999
10	Las Vegas Raiders	500–999

== Arts and culture ==
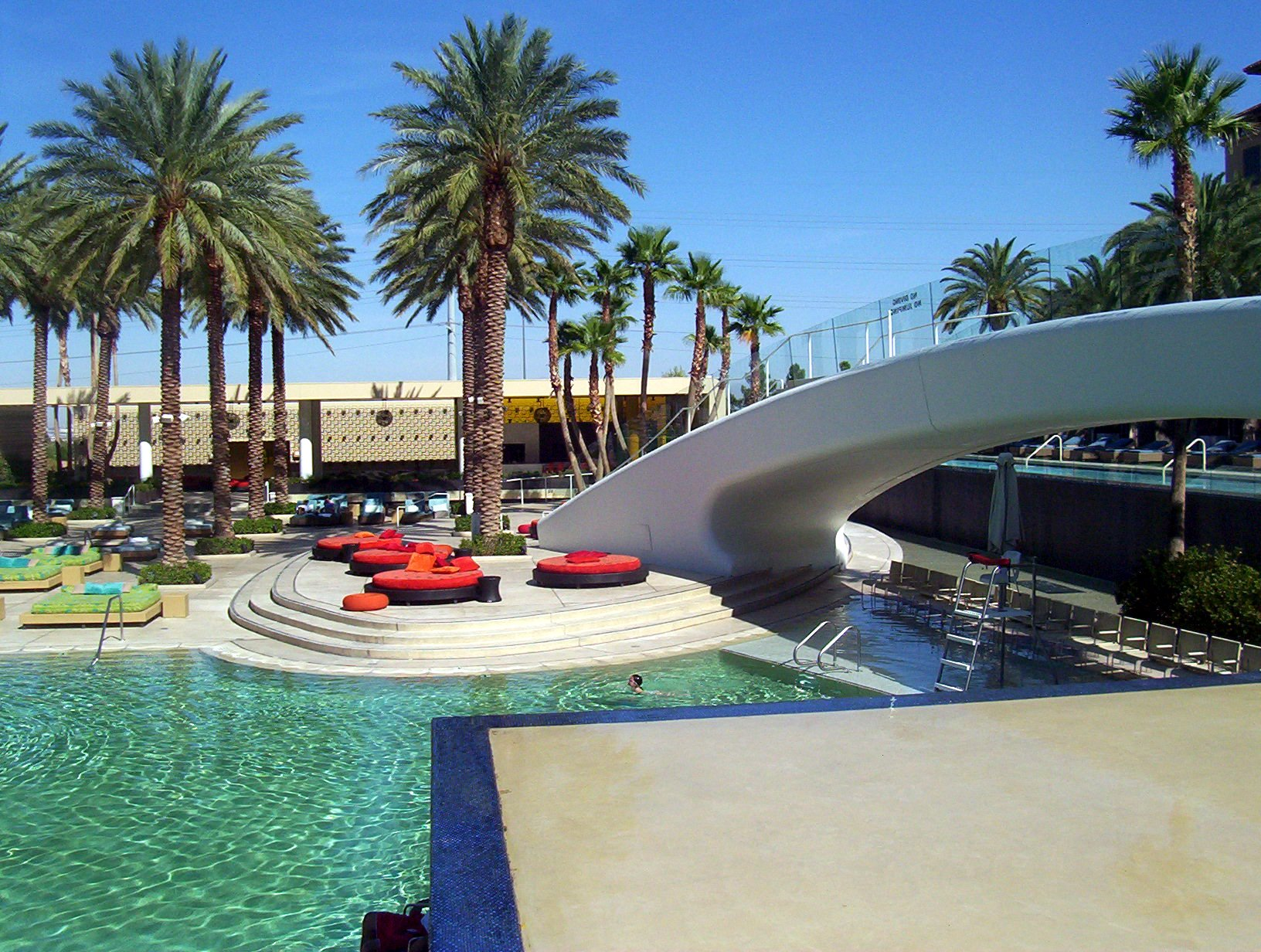
Green Valley Ranch

Entrance to the Water Street District in downtown Henderson.

An increasing number of major shopping malls, movie theater complexes, concert venues, restaurants and casino resorts offer residents a variety of choices for leisure time in Henderson. The city also sits a few miles southeast of Las Vegas and is not too far from the world-famous Las Vegas Strip. "Shakespeare in the Park" celebrated its tenth anniversary in 1996, a testament to Henderson's long-standing support for the arts and cultural programs. The city also boasts the largest recreational facility – the Henderson Multigenerational Facility – in Nevada as well as Nevada's only scenic Bird Preserve. The city supports a variety of other cultural events, many of which are held at the outdoor amphitheater, the largest one of its kind in Nevada.

=== Points of interest ===
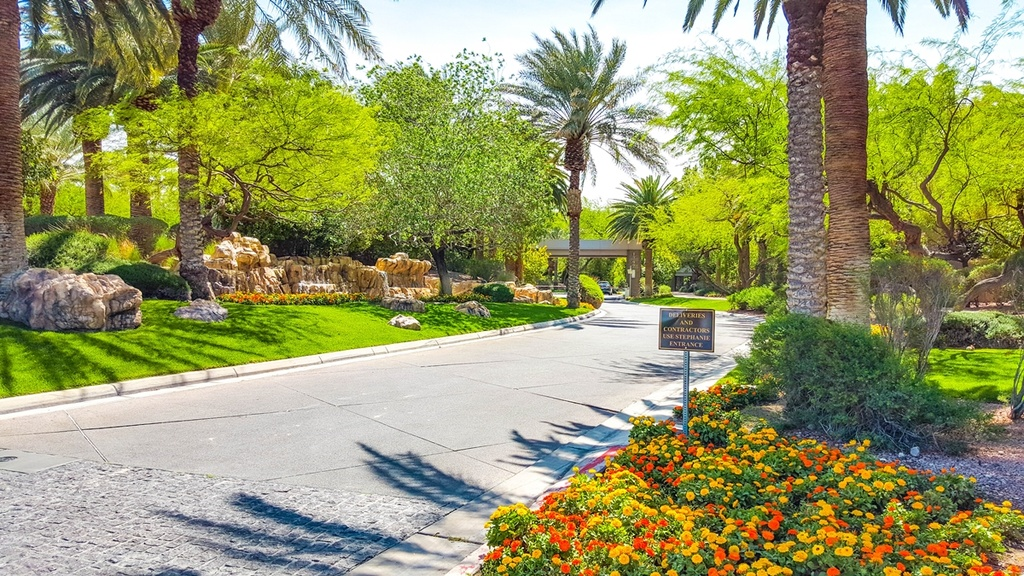
The entrance to MacDonald Highlands in Henderson

- Acacia Demonstration Gardens
- Anthem Country Club
- Clark County Heritage Museum
- The Cliff
- The District at Green Valley Ranch
- Ethel M Botanical Cactus Garden
- Ethel M Chocolate Factory
- Green Valley Ranch Resort, Spa, and Casino
- Henderson Bird Viewing Preserve and Water Reclamation Facility
- Lake Las Vegas
- Mershops Galleria at Sunset
- M Resort
- MacDonald Highlands
- Nevada State University
- Reflection Bay Golf Club
- Rio Secco Golf Club
- Seven Hills Estates
- Sunset Station
- Veteran's Wall

=== Library ===
Henderson has a public library system with five branches.

== Sports ==
America First Center in the Water Street District in downtown Henderson. The center is the practice arena for the Henderson Silver Knights.

The headquarters of the Las Vegas Raiders (NFL) and the Las Vegas Aces (WNBA) are located in Henderson.

The Las Vegas Raiders, formerly the Oakland Raiders, announced their relocation to Las Vegas in 2017. In 2018, they announced the purchase of 55 acres in the southwest part of Henderson where the team's executive offices and practice facility were built. The $75 million complex was named the Intermountain Health Performance Center and opened in June 2020.

The Las Vegas Aces' 64,000-square-foot (5,900 m^{2}) complex houses the team's practice facility, offices, training and weight rooms, hydrotherapy space, physical therapy area, locker rooms, a lecture hall, player and alumni lounges, and an on-site day care center. In 2023, the Aces became the first WNBA team to have a facility built exclusively for itself when their new complex opened.

Henderson is also home to three minor league professional sports teams: the Henderson Silver Knights of the American Hockey League, the Vegas Knight Hawks of the Indoor Football League, and the Vegas Thrill of Pro Volleyball Federation. All three teams are headquartered and play at the 6,000-seat Lee's Family Forum, formerly the Dollar Loan Center. Before folding, the NBA G League Ignite spent its final two seasons headquartered at the arena.

Henderson hosts an annual invitational rink bandy tournament.

=== Minor professional teams ===
Team	Sport	League	Venue (capacity)	Established	Titles
NBA G League Ignite	Basketball	NBAGL	Dollar Loan Center (6,019)	2020	0
Henderson Silver Knights	Ice hockey	AHL	Dollar Loan Center (5,567)	2020	0
Vegas Knight Hawks	Indoor football	IFL	Dollar Loan Center (5,567)	2021	0

== Parks and recreation ==
Henderson manages more than 300 miles (480 km) of scenic trails.

== Government ==
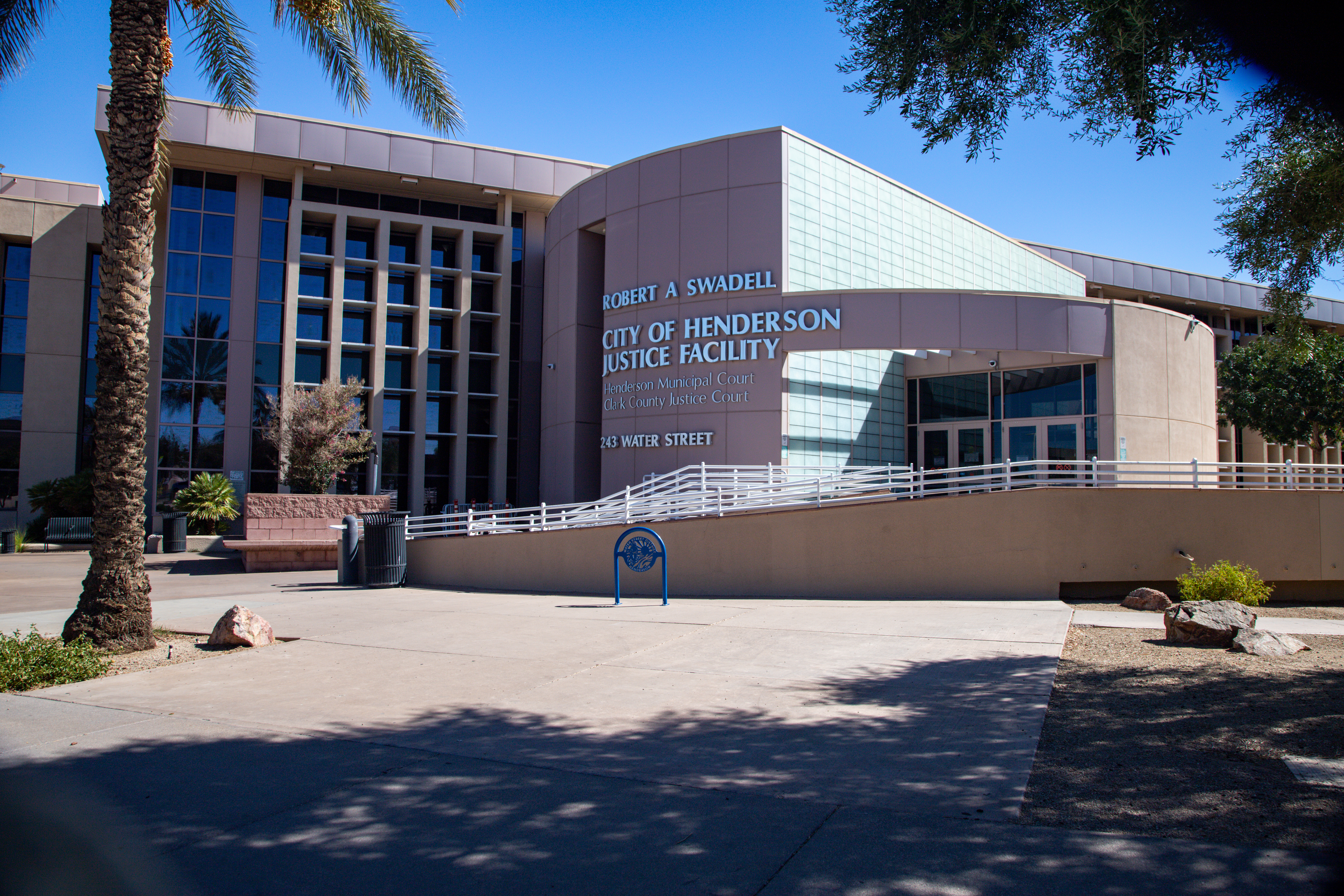
Henderson municipal and judicial township courthouse in the Water Street District. The facility also houses the Henderson Police Department detention center.

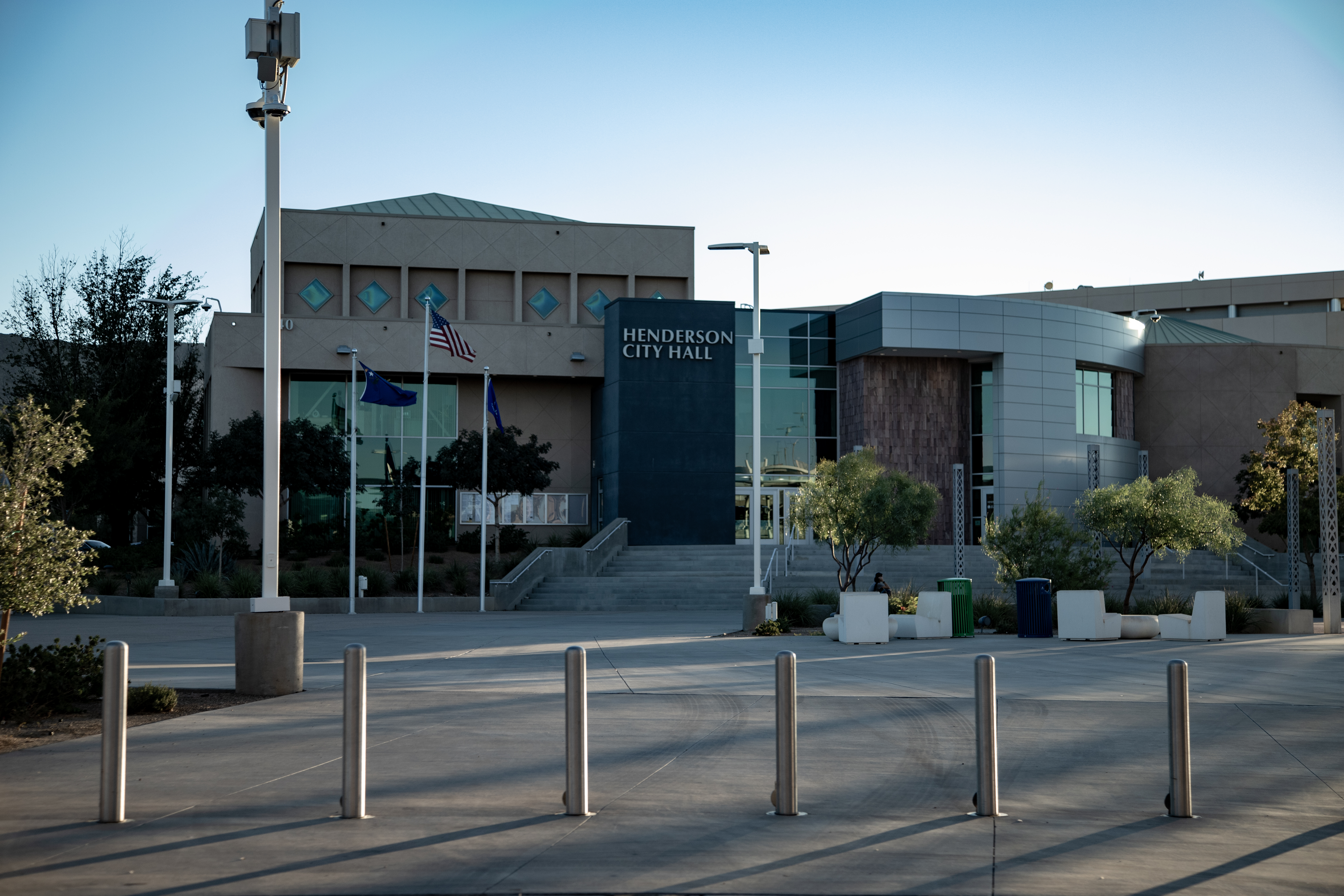
Henderson city hall, located in the Water Street District, houses many of the municipal government's administrative offices, including the city council chambers and mayor's office.

The city received its charter from the Nevada State Legislature in 1953, formally incorporating the city with a council/manager form of government.

Henderson is divided into four wards. A mayor and four council members are elected citywide, but no more than one council member are allowed to reside in each ward.

Lorna Kesterson was elected as Henderson's first female mayor, serving two terms until 1993.

Service	Mayor
1953–1957	James B. French
1957–1965	William B. Byrne
1965–1969	William R. Hampton
1969–1973	Estes M. McDoniel
1973–1975	Cruz Olague
1975	Richard A. Stewart Sr.
1975–1981	Lorin L. Williams
1981–1985	Leroy Zike
1985–1993	Lorna J. Kesterson
1993–1997	Robert A. Groesbeck
1997–2009	James B. Gibson
2009–2017	Andy Hafen
2017–2023	Debra March
2023–present	Michelle Romero

=== 2013 Americans with Disabilities Act settlement ===
In 2013, the Department of Justice (DOJ) announced it had reached a cooperative settlement agreement with the city of Henderson under the Americans with Disabilities Act (ADA). The DOJ received complaints by individuals who are deaf that officers for the city of Henderson did not provide them with qualified sign language interpreters and other auxiliary aids and services when needed for effective communication. One of the complainants was arrested and detained for two days in the Henderson detention facility, while the other was an alleged crime victim.

During its investigation into the allegations, the department inquired whether the city of Henderson would be interested in resolving the matter voluntarily. The city expressed its full commitment to ensure compliance with the ADA. Under the settlement, the city of Henderson will pay $35,000 to the complainants. The city agreed to provide sign language interpreters, usually within an hour of a person's request to law enforcement officers. Henderson also agreed to modify its handcuffing policies for people who use sign language or hand writing to communicate, and to adopt other policies consistent with the ADA.

== Education ==
The Clark County School District provides elementary and secondary public education. Henderson is the location for 29 elementary schools, nine middle schools, and nine high schools. Five of the nine high schools are public schools, including Basic, Coronado, Green Valley, Foothill, and Liberty. The remaining four are private college preparatory schools, including the Henderson International School. A tenth high school, Silverado High School, also serves parts of Henderson but is in unincorporated Clark County.

=== Findlay College Prep ===
Findlay Prep was a high school basketball program sponsored by the Henderson International School. Henderson International School – a private preparatory school owned by Meritas – hosted Findlay College Prep. Since its creation in 2006 by businessman Cliff Findlay, its dozen students were intermingled with The Henderson International School's already existing high school.

=== Colleges and universities ===
Henderson is home to Nevada State University, a member of the Nevada System of Higher Education, and has a satellite campus of the College of Southern Nevada. It also has campuses for private institutions of higher education including the Roseman University of Health Sciences, Touro University, and DeVry University.

Several for-profit colleges also operate in the city, including The Art Institute of Las Vegas and Everest College.

== Media ==
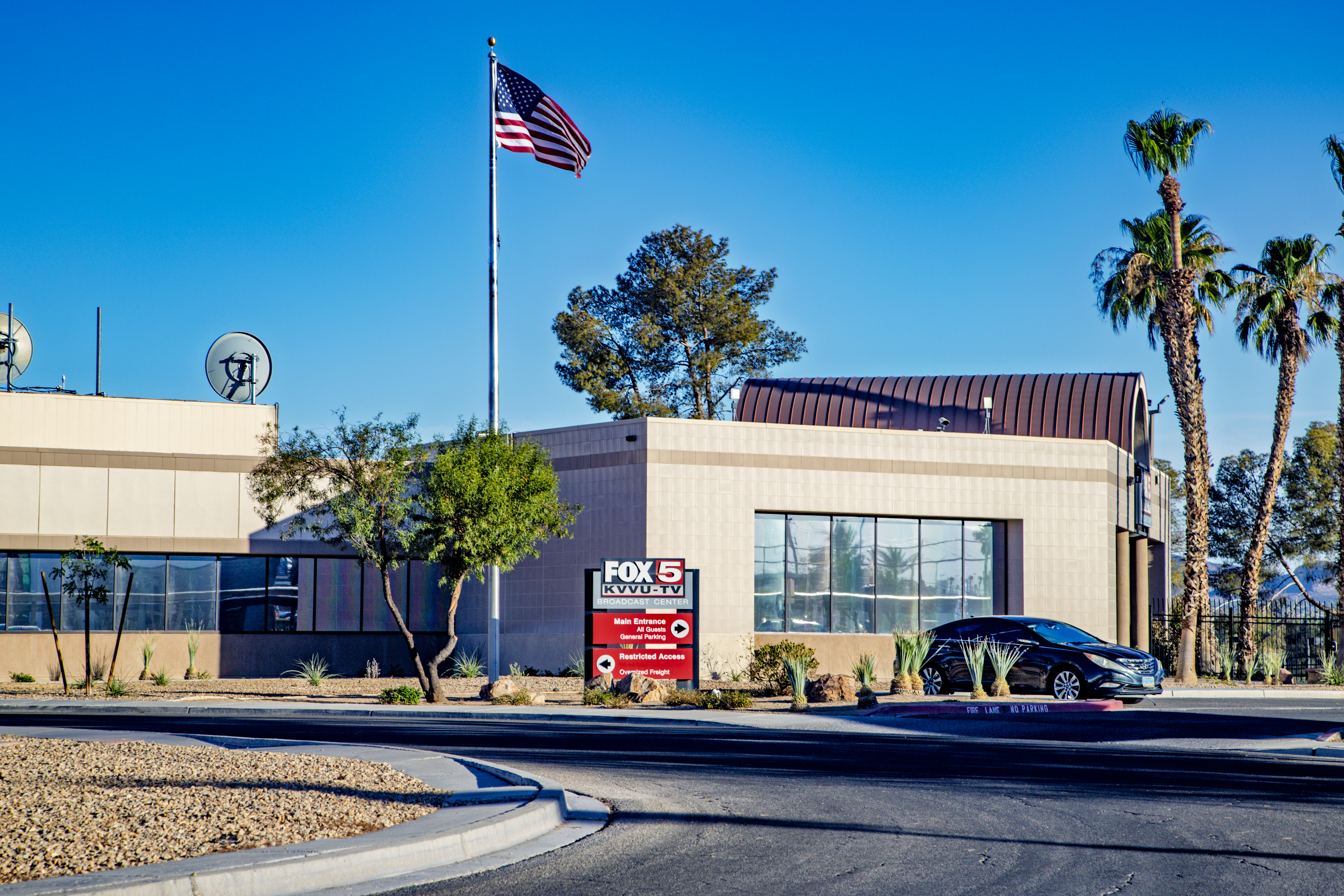
KVVU-TV studios in Henderson.

=== Newspapers ===
- Las Vegas Review-Journal
- Las Vegas Sun

=== Television ===
KVVU-TV (channel 5) is the Las Vegas Valley's Fox affiliate and licensed to Henderson, and is based from studios on the northwest side of the city.

== Infrastructure ==
=== Transportation ===
The city is served by RTC Transit (formerly Citizens Area Transit/CAT) with its network of bus routes which run throughout the Las Vegas Valley.

Henderson is served by four major highways: Boulder Highway (State Route 582), which is the main thoroughfare connecting with Las Vegas and Boulder City; Lake Mead Parkway (State Route 564); Interstate 11 and Interstate 215. State Route 146, also known as Saint Rose Parkway, connects Interstate 15 near Sloan with Interstate 215 in Green Valley. This stretch is formally a part of Lake Mead Parkway which is a direct link to Henderson for motorists traveling in and out of Southern California.

The city of Henderson has a low percentage of households without a car. In 2015, 2.8 percent of Henderson households lacked a car, and increased to 5 percent in 2016. The national average was 8.7 percent in 2016. Henderson averaged 1.74 cars per household in 2016, compared to a national average of 1.8.

Henderson is home for the Henderson Executive Airport. The main airport for the metropolitan area is Harry Reid International Airport, northwest of Henderson.

Street numbering is different within the city of Henderson than with the rest of the Las Vegas Valley. The center of Henderson lies within the intersection of Water Street and Lake Mead Parkway. The Henderson Police Department for years referred to Lake Mead Parkway (and its former name Lake Mead Drive) as "146", while Boulder Highway is often referred as "93", its former highway designation.

The Union Pacific Railroad serves Henderson's industrial area around the site formerly occupied by Basic Magnesium over a branch line originally built to support construction of Hoover Dam. The final few miles of the line, owned by the U.S. Government, were abandoned after the dam was completed. The line still extends to Boulder City; in 1985, the state purchased the section east of appropriately I-11, with the Nevada Southern Railroad Museum operating excursion trains over the easternmost seven miles (11 km).

=== Public safety ===
Fire prevention services are provided by the Henderson Fire Department and police services by the Henderson Police Department.

== Notable people ==
The following is an incomplete list of notable Henderson residents:

- Steve Aoki (born 1977), electro-house musician, record producer, DJ and music executive
- Zico Bailey (born 2000), soccer player
- Gavin Beavers (born 2005), soccer player
- Erica Blasberg (1984–2010), LPGA golfer
- Lisa Cano Burkhead, 36th lieutenant governor of Nevada
- Glen and Les Charles, creators of Cheers and Taxi
- Andrew Cherng (born 1948), founder of Panda Express
- Chumlee (full name Austin Lee Russell, born 1982), star of History Channel TV show Pawn Stars
- Tony Curtis (1925–2010), actor
- Phyllis Davis (1940–2013), film and television actress
- Hailey Dawson (born 2010), girl with 3D-printed robotic hand
- Thomas Dekker (born 1987), actor
- Sheena Easton (born 1959), Scottish singer and actress
- Joe Farré (born 1967), racing driver
- Flavor Flav (born 1959), rap music artist and reality television personality
- Brandon Flowers (born 1981), vocalist for The Killers
- Joey Gallo (born 1993), professional baseball outfielder
- Danny Gans (1956–2009), entertainer
- Greg Haugen (1960-2025), three-time world champion boxer
- Joe Heck (born 1961), U.S. Army brigadier general, former U.S. representative, and 2016 Republican nominee for United States Senate in Nevada
- Iris Kyle (born 1974), professional female bodybuilder
- Oksana Marafioti, author
- Danny Musovski (born 1995), soccer player
- Pierre Omidyar (born 1967), CEO and founder of eBay
- Jermaine O'Neal (born 1978), NBA player
- Marie Osmond (born 1959), singer, doll designer, and talk show host
- Orlando Pace, NFL Hall of Fame offensive lineman with the St. Louis Rams, purchased a home in Henderson in 2025.
- Paul Pierce (born 1977), NBA player
- Nick Rattigan (born 1992), multi-instrumentalist, journalist and music video director
- Harry Reid (1939–2021), United States senator
- Wayne Allyn Root (born 1961), political commentator and television host
- Jacky Rosen (born 1957), United States senator; former United States representative
- Nia Sanchez (born 1990), Miss Nevada USA 2014, Miss USA 2014 and 1st runner-up Miss Universe 2014
- David Sklansky (born 1947), professional poker player/author
- Mike Tyson (born 1966), retired heavyweight boxer and television personality
- Nancy Walton Laurie (born 1952), daughter of Walmart co-founder James "Bud" Walton
- Mary Wilson (1944–2021), singer

== In popular culture ==
Henderson appears in the 2010 video game Fallout: New Vegas, where it is depicted as home to the REPCONN headquarters.
