= Purple Heart Highway =

Purple Heart Highway may refer to:

- Des Moines Bypass
- Guam Highway 8
- Interstate 11
- Interstate 20, from Interstate 285 to U.S. Route 441
- Interstate 76, from Interstate 71 to Interstate 80
- Interstate 180 (Nebraska)
- Pennsylvania Route 5
- Pennsylvania Route 45
- U.S. Route 5, from East Hartford to East Windsor-Enfield
- U.S. Route 171
