= Water Street District (Henderson, Nevada) =

Redeveloped portion of downtown Henderson, Nevada, US

Coordinates: 36.032727°N 114.983047°W

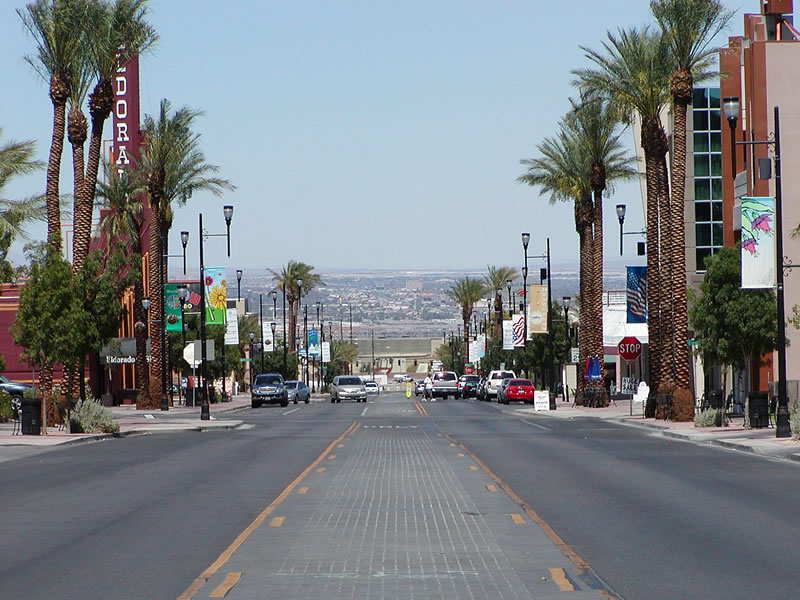
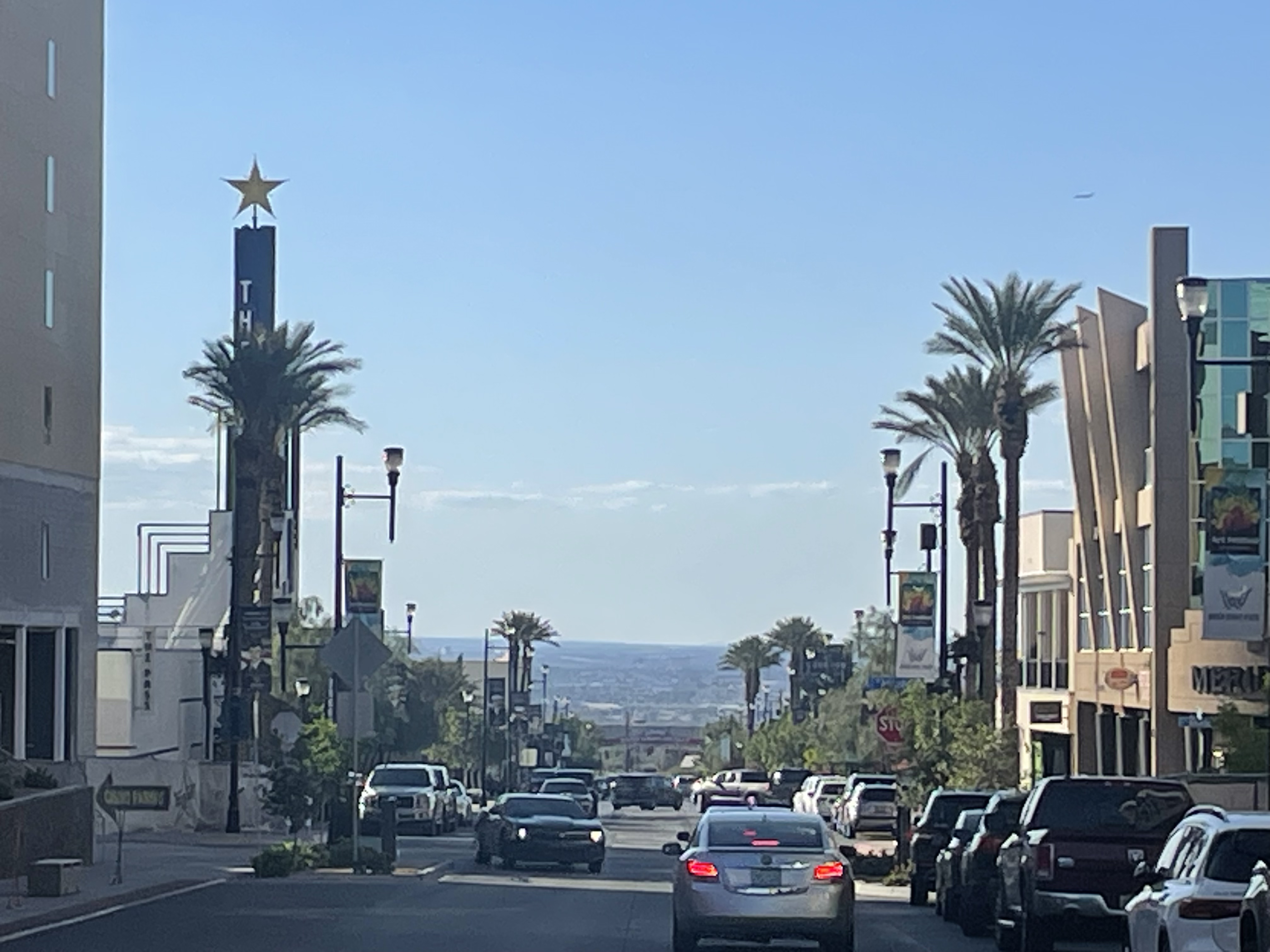
Looking north on Water Street toward the intersection of Atlantic Avenue, seen in 2008 (top) and 2024

The Water Street District is a redeveloped portion of downtown Henderson, Nevada. It includes stores, restaurants, office and residential space, and an ice rink used as the practice facility of the Henderson Silver Knights hockey team. The area is also home to Henderson's city hall and justice facility. The Water Street District hosts numerous annual events, including festivals, parades, car shows, and a farmers' market.

Water Street is the main road in downtown Henderson. Its name is derived from a water main that runs beneath the street; both date back to 1941. Retail in downtown Henderson gradually declined in the 1980s, as other parts of the city saw new development. The Henderson Redevelopment Agency was formed in 1995 to revitalize older areas of the city, with Water Street as the primary focus.

In 2002, the city branded the downtown area as the Water Street District. Visitation began to see an uptick in the late 2010s, following various redevelopment projects. The district runs along a one-mile stretch of South Water Street, from the intersections of Ocean Avenue at the south end to Lake Mead Parkway at the north end.

== History ==
The city of Henderson began in 1941, as a company town built by Basic Magnesium Inc. A water main was also built that year, leading to the company's magnesium plant. The road above the main was named Water Street. Downtown revitalization efforts go as far back as 1962, when Henderson's Urban Renewal Agency unsuccessfully proposed the demolition of "substandard" houses and businesses on Water Street. New areas of Henderson were rapidly developed starting in the mid-1980s, leaving older areas to deteriorate. Water Street evolved to feature different businesses such as banks and legal offices, while retail gradually dwindled. The Galleria Mall, opened in Henderson in 1996, contributed to the decline of downtown as shoppers migrated to the mall and newly opened retailers located elsewhere.

In 1992, a beautification project for Water Street was approved by the city council. The $1.8 million project added palm trees, landscaped medians, and street lights. In 1995, the city formed the Henderson Redevelopment Agency to revitalize older areas. The agency had 30 years to achieve its goal. Downtown was designated as a redevelopment district, with Water Street as the primary focus of revitalization efforts. In 1997, the city purchased 16 parcels in downtown that covered four acres, near Basic Street and Water Street. The property consisted of commercial and residential space, and the city planned to redevelop the land as part of its beautification efforts.

By the late 1990s, Henderson mayor James B. Gibson and business owners on Water Street were frustrated by the slow pace of redevelopment. However, the abundance of new housing nearby sparked a renewed interest in reviving the downtown area. A mixed-use project, Fountain Plaza, was proposed. It was downtown's first major redevelopment project since efforts began to revive the area. However, it was eventually canceled due to inadequate financing.

By 2000, the city had introduced a homeowner assistance program to fund renovations in downtown residences, hoping to improve the area. A utilities upgrade, including sewer and electrical, took place along Water Street in 2001. The project included the addition of fiber-optic cables for improved communication. A storm drainage system was also added to prevent the flooding of businesses, a common problem on Water Street.

City officials sought to make Water Street a pedestrian-friendly shopping area. In 2002, the city branded the downtown area as the Water Street District. The name was trademarked by the city 12 years later. Naperville, a suburb of Chicago, subsequently agreed to stop using the name when referring to its own downtown redevelopment.

Henderson sought to remove businesses such as pawn shops and bail bond agents by 2003, as part of its redevelopment efforts. A significant shopping demographic for the Water Street District would be the 8,000 workers in the nearby area, including city employees and those working at St. Rose Dominican Hospital. The city rezoned some nearby residential areas for possible future redevelopment, although this has yet to take place. An art gallery opened on Water Street in 2003, and was the first of several to open over the next three years as the city sought to attract hipsters to the area. Public art pieces such as murals were also added.

The city had issued a downtown revitalization strategy report in 2002, but its vision did not pan out due to the Great Recession (2007–2009). Two high-rise condominium projects – City Tower and Water Street Commons – were postponed due to poor economic conditions, ultimately going unbuilt. A third condominium project, Parkline Lofts, was also canceled. Existing businesses struggled in the years to come.

During 2008, the city passed a commercial rent incentive program to attract businesses to Water Street. The following year, the city approved a $1.5 million project to improve the area's natural gas infrastructure. Ongoing road construction and improvements resulted in forced closures for several businesses. As of 2011, the redevelopment agency had spent more than $60 million on the downtown area over the course of 16 years.

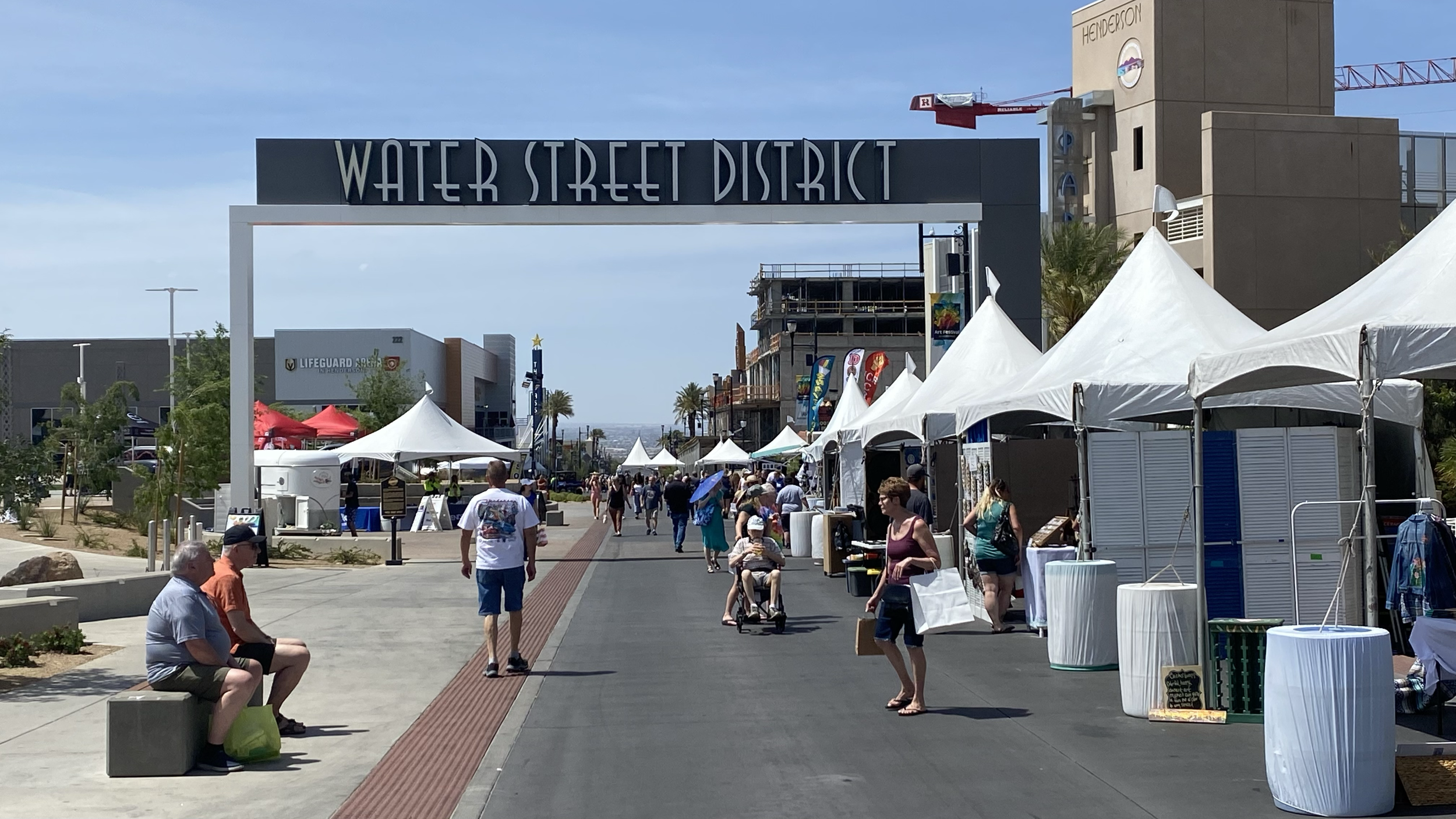
Water Street District arch next to city hall, 2022

In 2013, city officials hoped to bring several lounges to Water Street in an effort to add nightlife to the area. A year later, city planners issued a revised strategy report for reviving downtown. The plan would include loosened restrictions in order to attract more developers to the area, which had a population of 4,100 at the time. Another road improvement project, totaling $10.6 million, was underway in 2017.

Several restaurants opened in 2018, including one by rapper Flavor Flav. Several arch signs were also installed over Water Street to welcome visitors. With the new business openings, Henderson officials believed that redevelopment efforts over the preceding two decades had begun to pay off. Interest among developers had been renewed following the announcement that the Henderson Silver Knights, an American Hockey League team, would open an arena on Water Street. An uptick in Water Street visitation was attributed to a growing population nearby.

== Notable features ==
In addition to stores and restaurants, Water Street is also home to several gaming properties. Among them is The Pass Casino, which previously operated as the Eldorado from 1962 to 2020. The Pass began construction on a hotel addition, Atwell Suites, in 2023; it opened the following year, becoming the Water Street District's first hotel. Another casino, the Rainbow Club, has operated since 1967. The Pot O' Gold casino opened in 1996, and was renamed Emerald Island in 2003, following an ownership change and renovation. The Gold Mine Tavern has also operated on Water Street since the 1960s.

Parades have long been held on Water Street, which is also host to various other events as well. These include festivals and car shows. In 1999, Water Street began hosting regular art festivals and farmers' markets to help revitalize the downtown area.

=== Mixed-use ===
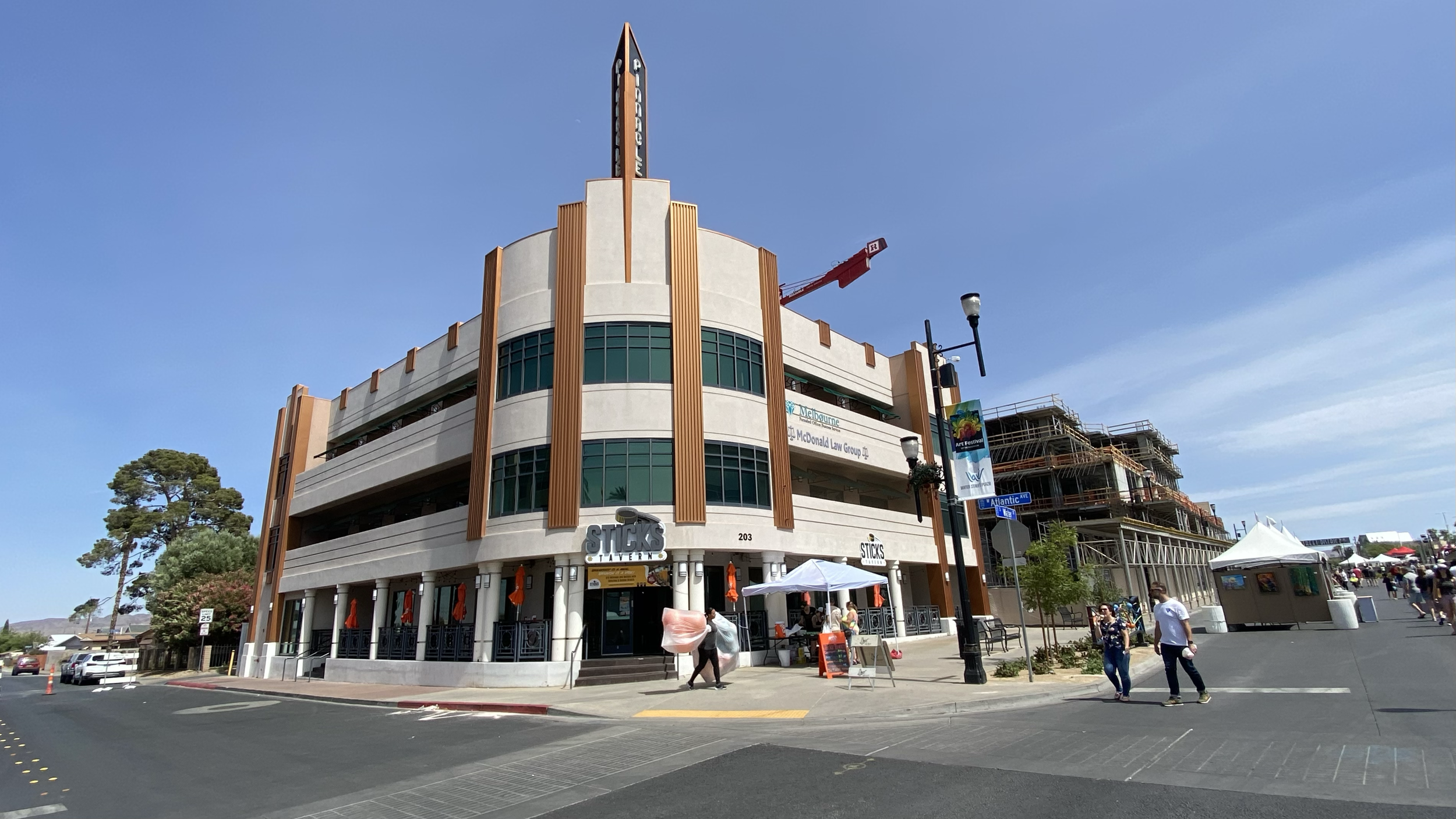
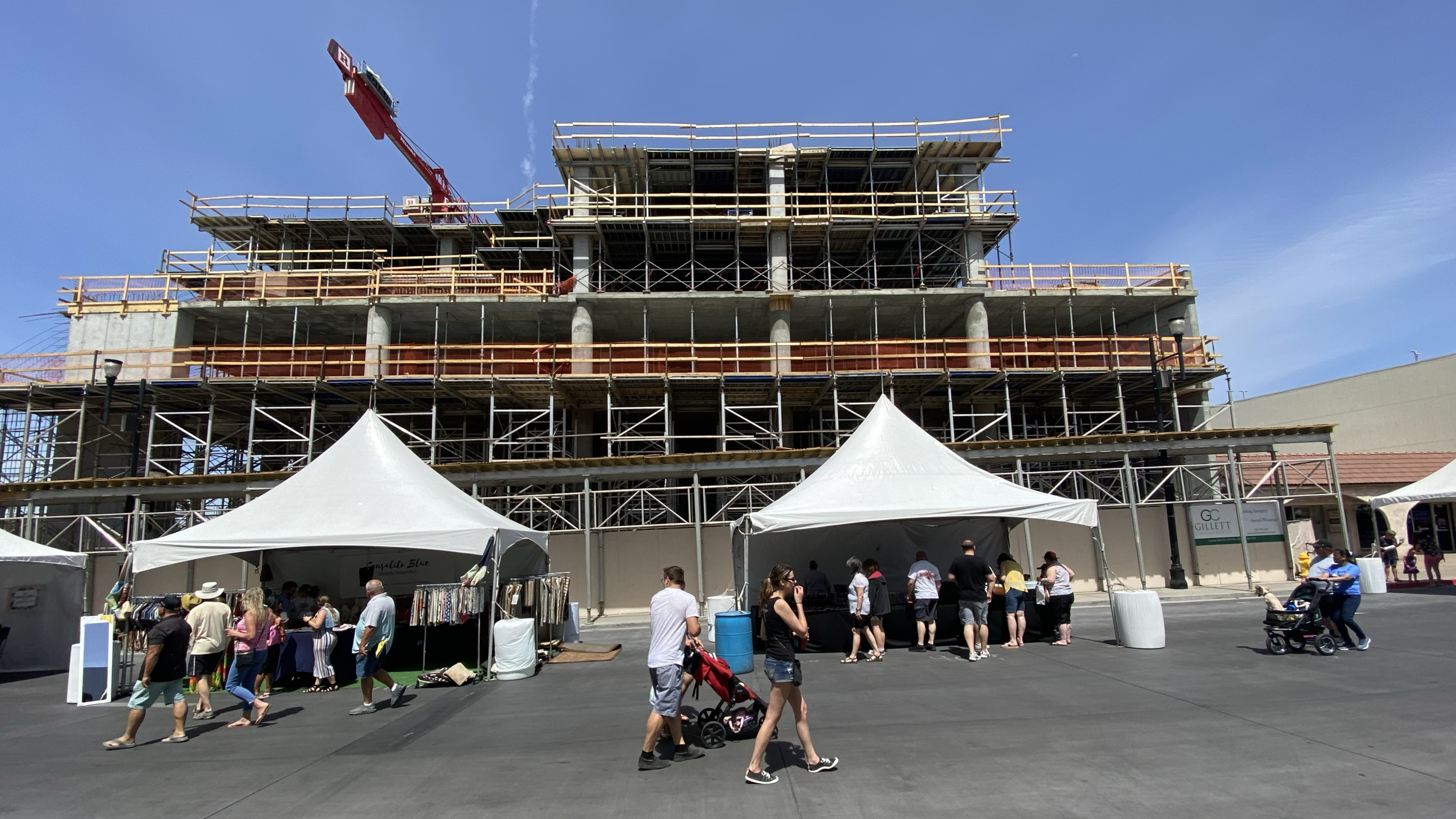
The Pinnacle and construction of The Watermark, 2022

Water Street has several mixed-use projects. Water Street South, an office and retail project, opened in 2005, on land that was occupied years earlier by houses. It has since been renamed the Corley Center. Nevada State College was among the building's early tenants, opening a satellite campus there.

The three-story Pinnacle opened in 2006 with office space and a restaurant. Another project, the three-story Meridian, includes office space and retailers. A multi-phase project, Southend on Water, was among new businesses opened in the late 2010s, providing additional office space and residential units. A motel, the Henderson Town House Motor Lodge, had opened on Water Street in 1962, and was demolished in 2019 to make way for additional mixed-use development.

In 2021, Strada Development Group began construction on The Watermark, a $50 million project that would include retailers, office space, and 151 apartments. At seven stories, it is the tallest building on Water Street. The Watermark was scheduled to open in 2023, but completion was pushed back due to financial problems, with the opening expected in mid-2025.

In 2022, Strada announced separate plans for The Waterfalls, a 22-story mixed-use project that would include hotel rooms and apartment units. It would be built on the site previously planned for City Tower, at the north end of the Water Street District. Construction was expected to begin during 2024, but this was delayed as a result of the Watermark's financial problems.

=== City facilities and ice rink ===
The city's Henderson Convention Center opened on Water Street in 1982, and would be expanded several times. Henderson City Hall opened adjacent to the convention center in 1989. Henderson's justice facility is located across from city hall. A library operated on Water Street until 2010, and the building has since been used for other city departments.

A renovation and expansion of city hall concluded in 2004, with new facilities constructed on land previously used as an event space. As a replacement, the city subsequently built the Henderson Events Center, adjacent to city hall on nearly three acres, previously used as a parking lot. The $11 million project opened in 2006, and includes an amphitheater. A $12 million improvement project was announced for the plaza in 2020. By 2021, the space had been renamed the Water Street Plaza.

The Henderson Convention Center was demolished in 2019, making way for the Silver Knights' Lifeguard Arena, which opened on November 10, 2020. It is an ice-skating center used by the team for practice, and is open to the public for youth and adult hockey programs, figure skating and special events. It shares design similarities with City National Arena at Downtown Summerlin. Lifeguard Arena was renamed America First Center in 2023.
