= Serket Golf Club =

Golf course in Henderson, Nevada, U.S.

Serket
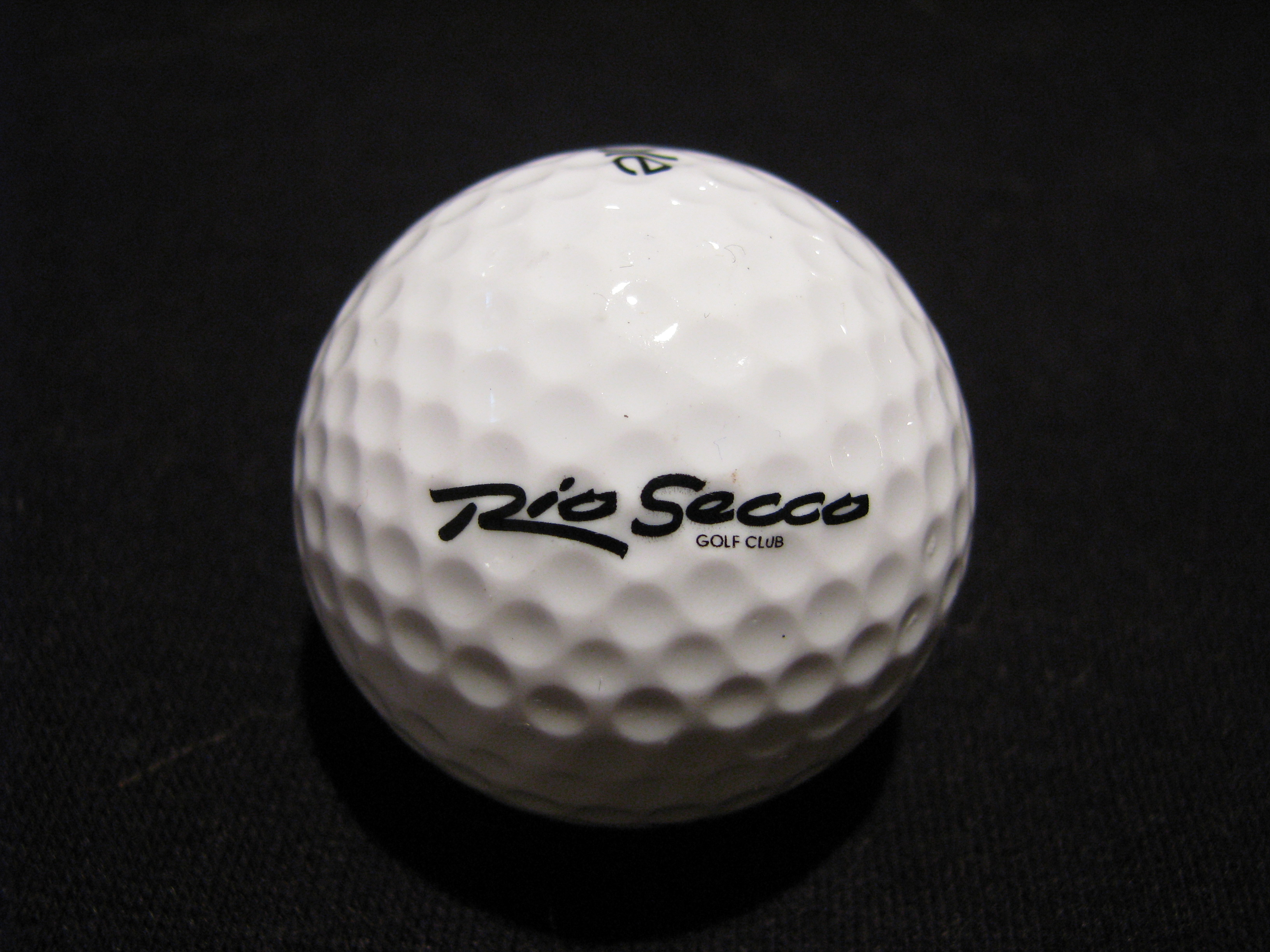
- Interactive map of Serket
- 35°58′33″N 115°6′38″W

Club information
- Location: Henderson, Nevada, U.S.
- Established: 1997; 29 years ago
- Type: Public
- Owner: Vici Properties
- Operator: Cabot-Managed Properties
- Total holes: 18
- Website: golfserket.com
- Designed by: Rees Jones
- Par: 72
- Length: 6,927 yards (6,334 m)
- Course rating: 73.7
- Slope rating: 138

Serket, formerly Rio Secco Golf Club, is a public golf course located in the Seven Hills neighborhood of Henderson, in the Las Vegas Valley. The course has hosted the annual Tiger Woods Jam and other charity and competitive events including the VegasGolfer Pro Showdown. It is owned by Vici Properties and operated by Cabot.

Serket features six holes through steep canyons, six holes on a plateau overlooking the city and six holes in a broad desert mountain range. The range is 5778 to 7332 feet.

== History ==
Rio Secco was designed and built in 1997 by golf course architect Rees Jones for the Rio All Suite Hotel and Casino. When Rio Secco opened in 1997, Golf Digest and Golf Magazine voted it among the top ten new public courses.

The Rio was purchased by Harrah's Entertainment (later Caesars Entertainment) in 1998. The golf club was included in the 2017 spin-off of Vici Properties from Caesars.

In 2022, Cabot assumed the operations of Rio Secco and Vici's other golf courses under a 20-year agreement. In 2025, Cabot rebranded Rio Secco as Serket.
