= River Mountains =

Mountain range in Nevada, United States

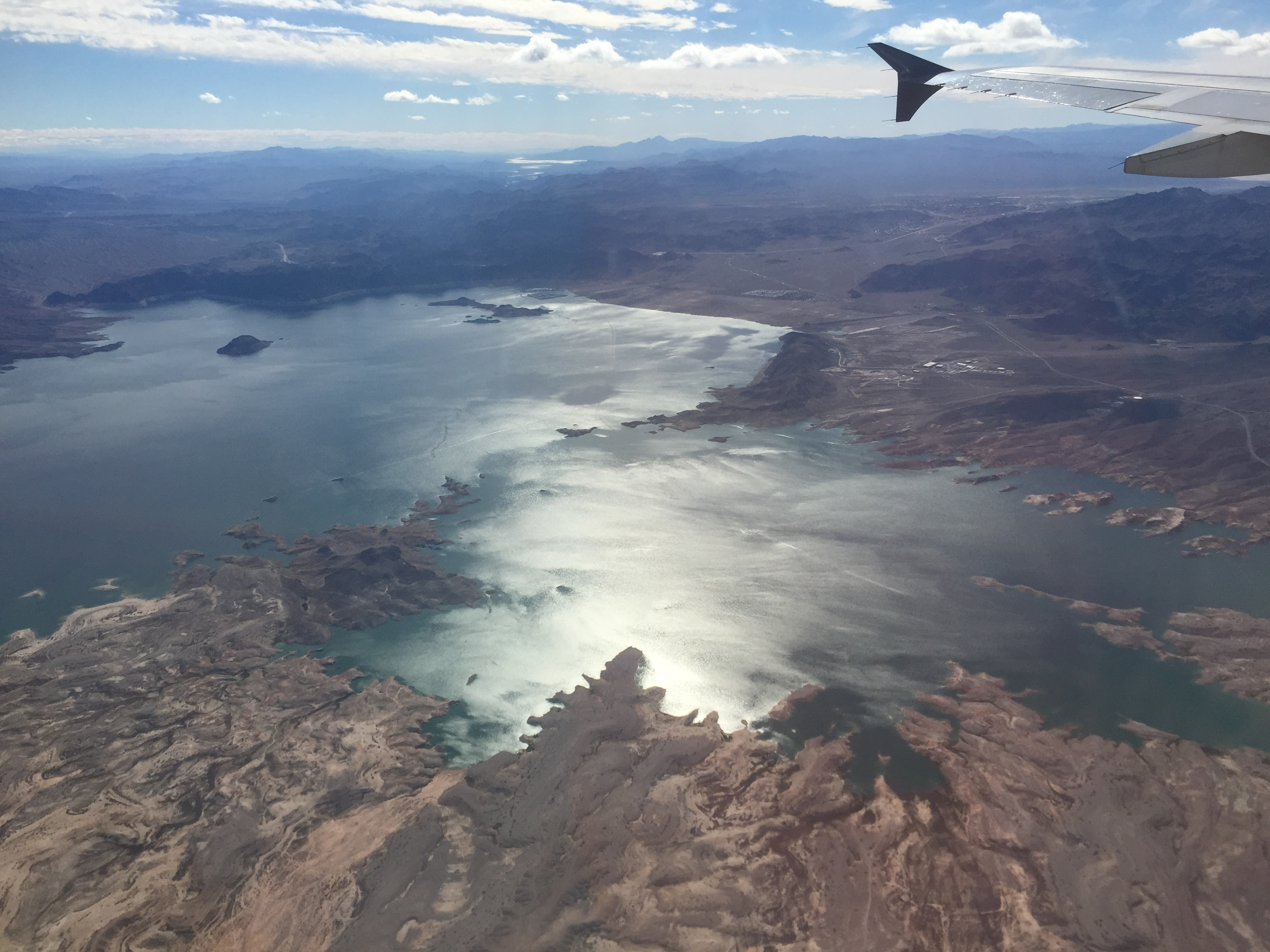
- The River Mountains, the black range at upper right near bay

Highest point
- Elevation: 963 m (3,159 ft)

Geography
- Location within Nevada
- Country: United States
- State: Nevada
- District: Clark County
- Range coordinates: 36°1′49.923″N 114°51′39.955″W
- Topo map: USGS Boulder Beach

The River Mountains are a mountain range in Clark County, Nevada, United States. They demarcate the Las Vegas Watershed from the Lake Mead Watershed.
