= Luxury magazine =

A luxury magazine is a printed or online magazine marketed to the ultra-affluent that feature high-value products like sports cars, jewelry, mechanical watches, real estate, yachts, private jets and exotic vacations.

Nationally, magazines such as Robb Report primarily offer advertisements for expensive goods. In many expensive markets, local titles exist to target the affluent, including more than 65 magazines across 22 cities by Modern Luxury, which acquired longtime competitor Niche Media in 2017.) Its titles include San Francisco, Hamptons, Ocean Drive, Aspen Magazine, Peak (magazine), Philadelphia Style, Austin Way, Manhattan, and Angeleno, among others.
