= Matt Medved =

American entrepreneur

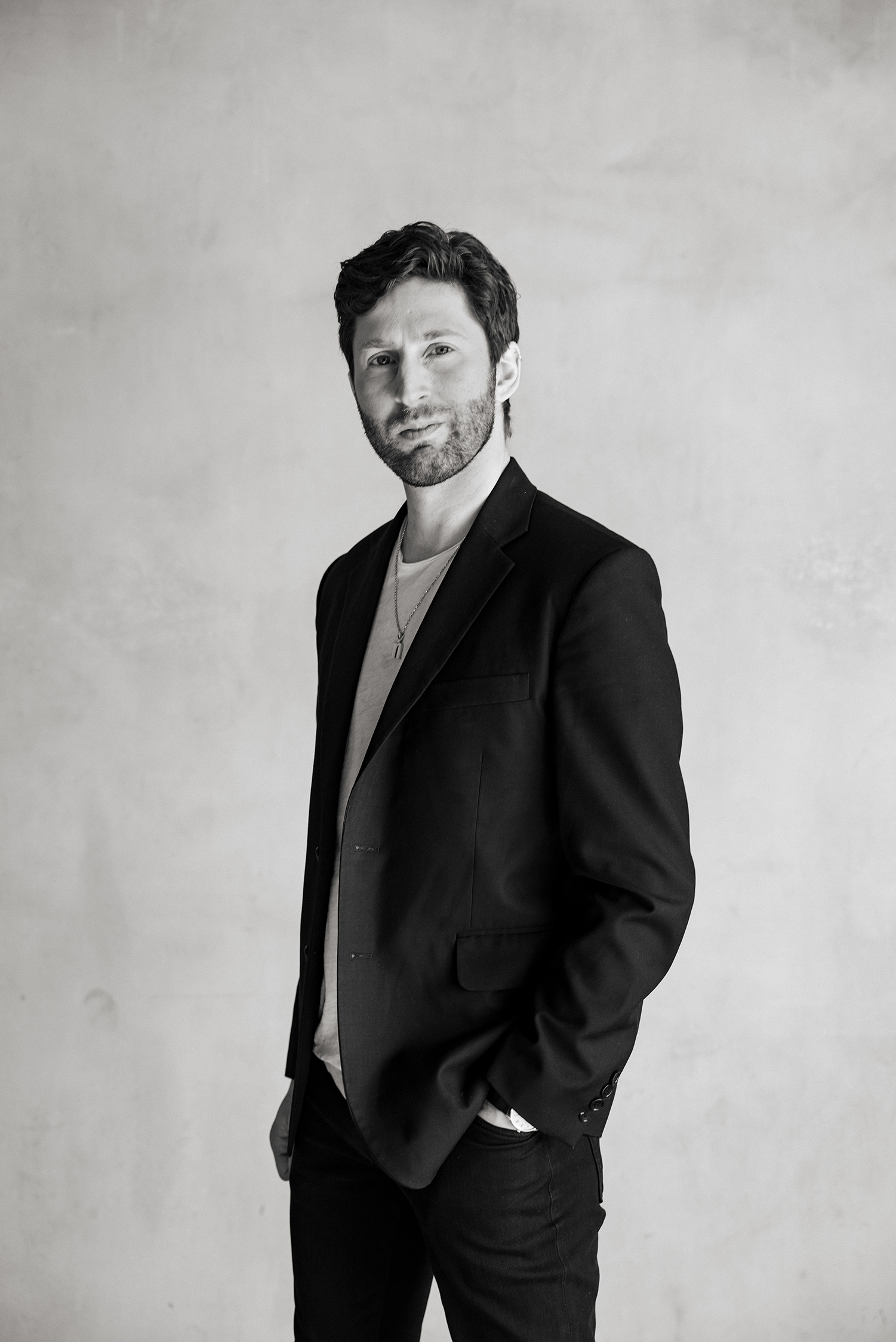
- Born: Matthew Bryan Medved; Rochester, New York, U.S.
- Education: Northwestern University George Washington University Law School Elliott School of International Affairs
- Occupations: Journalist; DJ; record producer

Matthew Bryan Medved is an American entrepreneur, journalist, DJ and record producer.

He is the co-founder, CEO, and editor-in-chief of Now Media, a digital media company covering technology and culture, with a focus on art, AI, and blockchain.

Medved previously served as senior vice president of content at lifestyle publisher Modern Luxury and editor-in-chief of Spin, an American music and culture magazine. He is the founder of Billboard Dance, Billboard's dance and electronic music channel.

== Background ==
Medved grew up in Rochester, New York. Medved is a graduate of Northwestern University where he majored in journalism and worked for the Medill Innocence Project.

While earning law and master's degrees from George Washington University, Medved worked for global conflict resolution NGO Search for Common Ground in Nigeria. He is based in New York City.

== Career ==
=== Billboard ===
In May 2015, Medved launched Billboard Dance, Billboard's dance and electronic music channel. He played a role in breaking future headliners like Kygo and Marshmello.

In September 2017, Medved co-hosted the inaugural Electronic Music Awards in Los Angeles.

In March 2018, Medved launched Billboard's new ranking of dance musicians titled Billboard Dance 100.

During his time at Billboard, artists like Alison Wonderland, REZZ, TOKiMONSTA, DJ Snake, Marshmello, Zedd, Major Lazer, The Chainsmokers, Diplo, Kygo, Martin Garrix and Steve Angello appeared on the magazine's cover.

=== Spin ===
In December 2018, Medved was named editor-in-chief of Spin. During his tenure, artists like Billie Eilish, Ty Dolla $ign, Charli XCX and Avicii graced the publication's cover. Medved exited with the title's sale to private equity in 2020.

=== Modern Luxury ===
In August 2020, Medved was named senior vice president of content at lifestyle publisher Modern Luxury, whose titles include Ocean Drive, Hamptons, Gotham, LA Confidential, Aspen, Boston Common, Philadelphia Style, Chicago Social, San Francisco, Vegas and others.

=== Now Media ===
In January 2021, Medved co-founded web3 digital media company Now Media with Alejandro Navia and Sam Hysell.

In December 2021, Now Media partnered with Christie's on an exhibition titled "The Gateway" during Art Basel Miami and co-curated the major auction house's sale that closed at $3.6 million.

In December 2023, Now Media brought Gateway Miami to the Faena Forum.

In February 2024, Now Media deployed its Sovereignty content tool suite on the Base blockchain to help combat misinformation with onchain content authentication.

=== DJ ===
As a DJ/producer, Medved has performed at global festivals including Tomorrowland, Electric Daisy Carnival, Electric Zoo, Billboard Hot 100 Festival, Sunset Music Festival, Sunburn Festival, Camp Bisco, Oasis Festival and Abroadfest.

He has signed releases to Interscope Records, RCA Records, Astralwerks and Downtown Records.
