= Peak (magazine) =

Colorado luxury lifestyle magazine

- Cover of Winter 2022/Spring 2023 issue, featuring Bode Miller by Dave Pecunies
- Frequency: Biannual
- Total circulation: 40,227 (2013)
- Founded: 2004
- First issue: July 2004
- Company: Modern Luxury
- Country: United States
- Based in: Aspen
- Language: English
- Website: www.modernluxury.com/aspen

Peak (formerly Aspen Peak) is a Colorado luxury lifestyle magazine published by Modern Luxury Media. Originally founded as Aspen Peak in 2004 to serve the Aspen community, the publication was repositioned in 2021 as Modern Luxury Peak with an expanded statewide focus covering both the Front Range and Colorado's mountain resort towns. It is published biannually.

== History ==
Aspen Peak was founded in July 2004 by Jason Binn under his company Niche Media, established in 1992. The magazine was designed to serve Aspen's most affluent residents and visitors, covering topics including art, beauty, business, culture, dining, entertainment, fashion, interior design, jewelry, nightlife, philanthropy, real estate, sports, and travel, as well as the Colorado social scene. It was published biannually—once in summer/fall and once in winter/spring—and positioned itself as "Aspen's own coffee table book," with the first issue featuring Kate Hudson on the first cover, and Kevin Costner on the second cover. Leigh Vogel was the founding editor-in-chief, at the helm for over three years; her successors included Erin Lentz, Damien Williamson, and Brooke Ely Danielson. The magazine celebrated its 15th anniversary in 2019.

In 2006, Binn sold Niche Media to the Greenspun Media Group. After a successful merger and transition, Binn continued to oversee operations until his resignation in 2010, at which point he became Chief Advisor to Gilt Groupe Chairman Kevin Ryan and went on to found DuJour. The Greenspun Media Group was subsequently rebranded as GreenGale Publishing.

In April 2017, Modern Luxury Media acquired GreenGale Publishing, bringing Aspen Peak into a portfolio that also included Aspen Magazine, Hamptons, Ocean Drive, and more than 65 other titles across 22 markets. Modern Luxury CEO Michael Dickey stated at the time that he had "no plans to close any of the newly acquired magazines" and affirmed that Aspen Peak would continue to exist.

== Relaunch as Modern Luxury Peak (2021–present) ==
In March 2021, Modern Luxury Media announced the repositioning of the publication as Modern Luxury Peak, with the first issue launching in June 2021. The inaugural issue's publisher letter described the title as "completely reenvisioned" to cover all of Colorado beyond the Roaring Fork Valley, expanding its scope to include Denver, Boulder, and resort towns such as Vail, Telluride, and Crested Butte.

Helen Olsson was named editor-in-chief. Olsson had previously served as editor-in-chief of Epic Life magazine and held editorial roles at Skiing and Sensi. Her writing has appeared in the New York Times, Ski, and 5280, among others. The magazine is published each August and November.

Peak covers luxury lifestyle across Colorado, with content spanning art and culture, food and wine, fashion, architecture, real estate, and travel, alongside profiles of notable Coloradans.
