= Green Valley Ranch =

Casino hotel in Nevada, United States

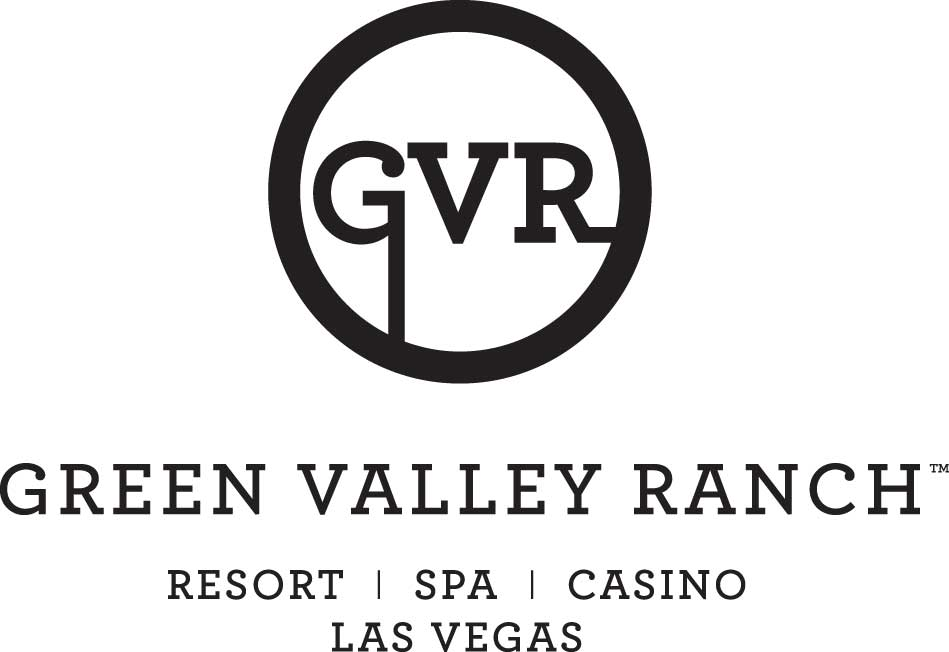

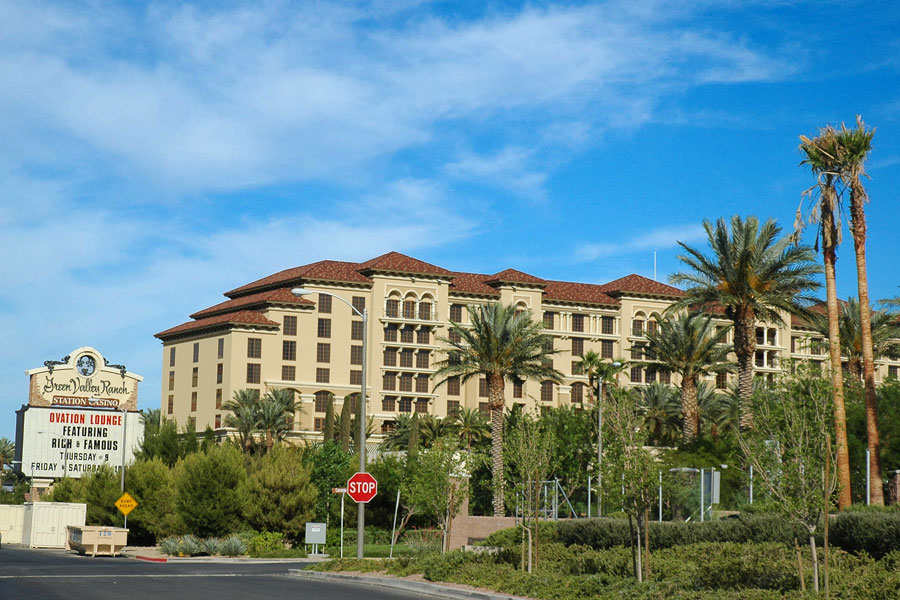
- Green Valley Ranch in 2007
- Interactive map of Green Valley Ranch
- Location: Henderson, Nevada, U.S.; 2300 Paseo Verde Parkway; 36°1′15.56″N 115°5′27.8″W
- Opened: December 18, 2001; 24 years ago
- Theme: Mediterranean
- No. of rooms: 497
- Gaming space: 143,891 sq ft (13,367.9 m^{2})
- Signature attractions: Drop Bar; Ovation Lounge (2007–2012); Regal Cinemas
- Notable restaurants: Lucky Penny (formerly Grand Café); Feast Buffet (2002–2020); Borracha Mexican Cantina; Bottiglia Cucina & Enoteca; Hank's Fine Steaks; Oyster Bar; Pizza Rock; Tony's Slice House
- Casino type: Land-based
- Owner: Station Casinos
- Renovated in: 2003–2006, 2014–15, 2023–24
- Website: greenvalleyranch.com

Green Valley Ranch is a hotel and casino located within the eponymous community in Henderson, Nevada. It is owned and operated by Station Casinos, and includes a 143,891 sq ft (13,367.9 m^{2}) casino. The resort was initially proposed by American Nevada Corporation, which received city approval to build it in 1996. In addition to a hotel-casino, the company also planned to build a mixed-use project to accompany it.

Construction began in 2000, after American Nevada partnered with Station Casinos, which would co-own and operate the property. Green Valley Ranch opened on December 18, 2001, with 201 rooms and a 50,000 sq ft (4,600 m^{2}) casino. While a locals casino, the resort was designed with an upscale element. Built at a cost of $300 million, it was Station's most expensive resort up to that point, and the most expensive locals casino in Las Vegas history. The resort includes various restaurants, a Regal Cinemas movie theater, and a spa.

American Nevada's mixed-use project opened on adjacent property in 2004, as The District at Green Valley Ranch. A hotel expansion opened in 2005, increasing the room count to 497. Station took over full ownership of the resort in June 2011.

== History ==
=== Background and construction ===
The resort was built in the neighborhood of Green Valley Ranch, located within the city of Henderson, Nevada. The Green Valley Ranch area was developed by American Nevada Corporation, a company owned by the Greenspun family. American Nevada received city approval to build a resort in 1996. In addition to a hotel and casino, the project plans also included restaurant, retail, medical, and office space. American Nevada planned to develop the project with a joint partner. The project would take 10 to 15 years to fully build out, and construction was not scheduled to begin for at least two years, pending the completion of the adjacent Las Vegas Beltway. The beltway made the property a desirable location for a resort.

Some nearby homeowners opposed the project, concerned about the impact it could have on the area, although the company alleviated most concerns after holding more than 30 meetings with residents. American Nevada assured homeowners that the project would be an upscale resort and a benefit to the community. The company had planned for a 250-foot-high hotel tower, allowing for more property which would be used as scenic landscaping. However, the tower was scaled down to 80 feet after residents complained about the height.

The project took years to materialize as it went through the design process, while American Nevada simultaneously awaited the completion of the nearby beltway. In September 1999, American Nevada and Station Casinos were in negotiations to partner on the future resort project. The two companies had previously partnered on a small casino and microbrewery in Henderson. The Greenspun family would provide the property for the resort, while Station would develop and operate it. Station would co-own the project with GCR Gaming LLC, a subsidiary of American Nevada. The two announced their partnership in March 2000, and the resort would include 200 hotel rooms, the minimum number required for a non-restricted gaming license. It would be the smallest of Station's local resort properties.

Construction began around August 2000, with Perini Building Company as the general contractor. By April 2001, the resort's estimated cost had increased to $300 million, up approximately $30 million from a year earlier. The increase was attributed to design changes involving additional convention space and higher-end hotel rooms. The construction of an underground parking facility also cost more than initially expected. Both companies contributed $50 million, and a bank group provided $165 million to the project. Various equipment was leased for $35 million.

=== Opening and early years ===
Green Valley Ranch opened at 9:30 p.m. on December 18, 2001, following a fireworks show. It opened on schedule despite poor economic conditions brought on by the September 11 attacks. The resort employed 2,000 people, including roughly 400 who had been laid off from other resorts. Brian Greenspun, head of The Greenspun Corporation, said the opening date was not ideal but "on the other hand, we're putting all of these (laid off) people back to work, and you've got to open sometime".

Green Valley Ranch features a Mediterranean theme. It was Station's most expensive and upscale resort ever, and the most expensive locals casino in Las Vegas history. It included features such as a presidential suite and a high-limit gaming area. The company's prior resorts were known for cheap amenities, although Green Valley Ranch would also continue such offerings, including $5 blackjack and penny slot machines. The resort was described by its general manager as a "value-priced luxury hotel". Station president Lorenzo Fertitta described the upscale design as "the next step in the evolution of our company". The resort was targeted at local residents, particularly those over the age of 55. The design was made to appeal to higher-end residents living in nearby communities such as Anthem and Seven Hills. Another target demographic was tourists, and the hotel offered a 24-hour limousine shuttle service to take them to the Las Vegas Strip.

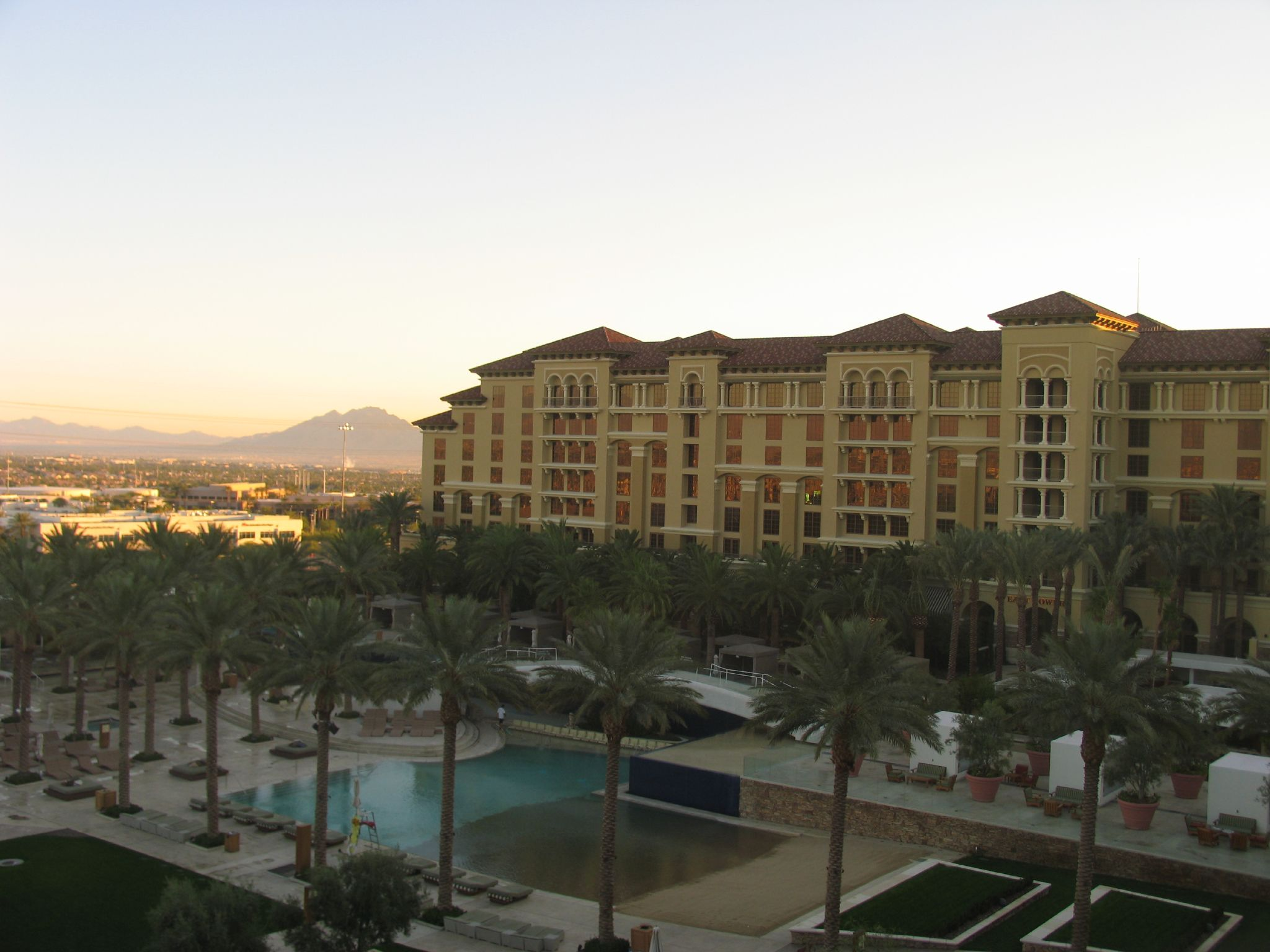
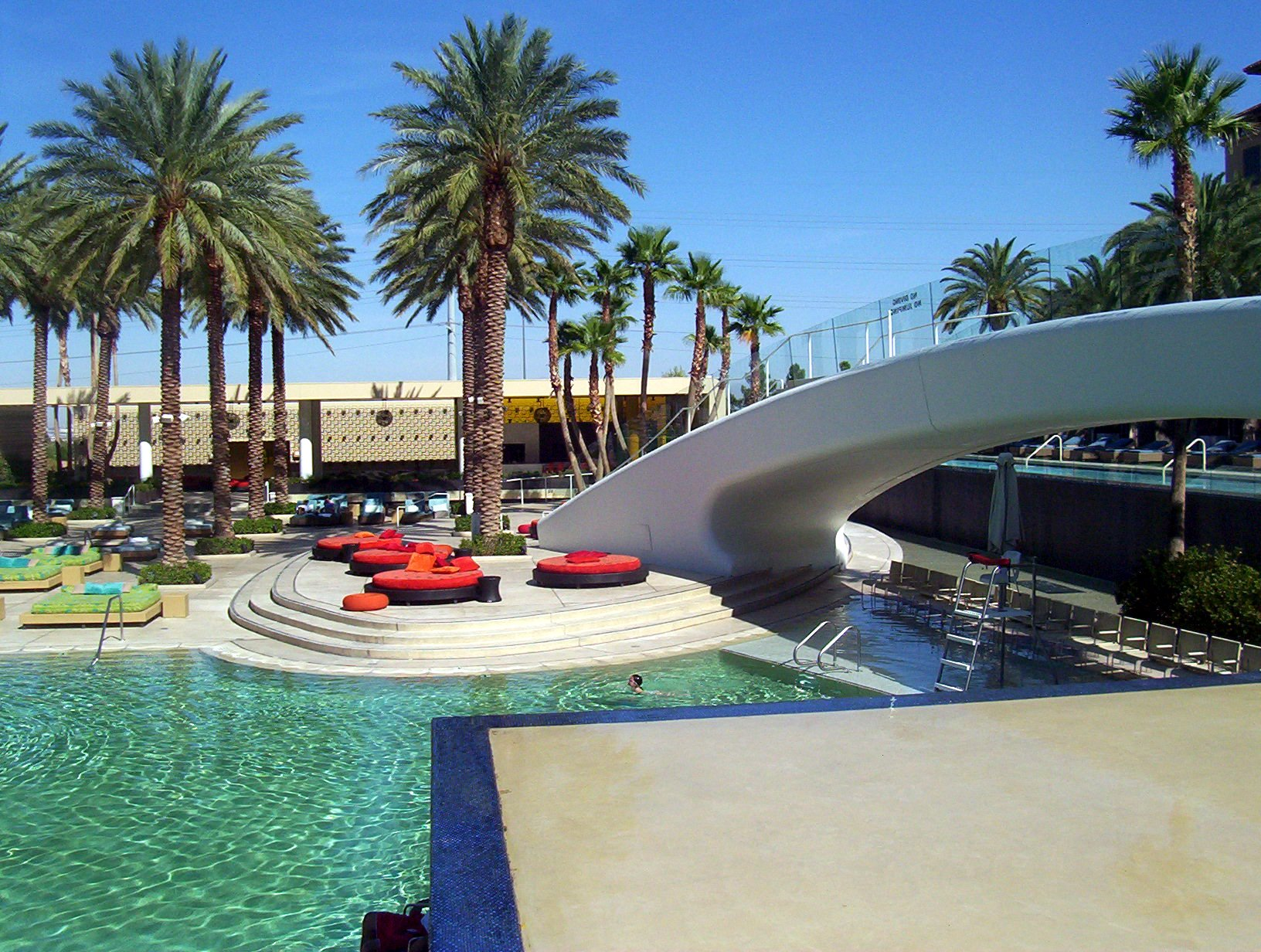
New hotel tower and pool area

The 50,000 sq ft (4,600 m^{2}) casino had more than 2,500 slot machines, 53 table games, and a sportsbook. The hotel included 201 rooms, and due to popular demand, design plans were underway for a second tower offering another 200. The property had enough acreage to support 600 rooms in total. The resort had seven main restaurants, including The Original Pancake House, a sports-themed restaurant, and a 500-seat buffet. It also had a food court with six fast-food eateries. Other features included a 10-screen Regal Cinemas theater, and 11,000 sq ft (1,000 m^{2}) of convention space.

The resort also included the Whiskey Sky nightclub, which occupied interior space and an outdoor pool area. It was operated by Midnight Oil Company, marking its fifth location nationwide. The outdoor portion was known as Whiskey Beach, and it included a spa, a restaurant, tennis and bocce ball courts, and a three-acre vineyard. Wine is not produced from the vineyard, which was added only for atmosphere. The casino's Drop Bar was designed by Michael Czysz, and was operated by Rande Gerber, who also owned Whiskey Sky.

In January 2003, Green Valley Ranch became the first locals casino in the Las Vegas Valley to receive an AAA Four Diamond Award. An expansion began at the end of the year. It included 296 hotel rooms, built on the property's north side, in between a parking garage and the pool area. The project brought the room count to 497, and also added more meeting space. The spa was also enlarged, and three high-end suites were added in an effort to attract high rollers from the Las Vegas Strip. The expansion cost $115 million, and began opening in January 2005. A poker room was added later that year. The expansion also included several new restaurants, such as Hank's Fine Steaks & Martinis, a steakhouse named after Hank Greenspun. Phase three of the expansion project opened in October 2006, adding additional restaurants and a new parking garage. The resort's pool area is popular among local residents and has hosted pool parties going back to 2005.

=== Dispute and ownership change ===
Station Casinos filed for bankruptcy in 2009, due to the effects of the Great Recession. A dispute emerged between GCR Gaming and Station Casinos at the end of the year. GCR believed that Station had been involved in a "long-running scheme" to divert customers from the Green Valley Ranch to other properties that were fully owned by Station. GCR sought to have Station removed as manager, but did not intend to buy out its interest in the resort. Station said that GCR's allegations originated from a disgruntled general manager who was fired in November 2009. Station said that he threatened to go public with false allegations in an attempt to extort money from the company.

GV Ranch Station Inc. – a Station subsidiary which managed the resort – filed for bankruptcy in February 2010. The resort itself did not file and continued operations. GCR filed a complaint and alleged that the bankruptcy filing was done in an effort to block attempts to remove Station as manager. In response, Station said, "We are extremely disappointed that the Greenspuns have joined the fray of out-of-the-money constituents seeking to bring merit-less lawsuits in connection with our bankruptcy proceedings". Meanwhile, bondholders for Station were opposed to loans that the company had been making to the managing subsidiary. The money was used to keep the resort operational, although bondholders considered the loans risky.

A settlement between GCR and Station was announced in May 2010, and the two companies hoped to restructure the resort's debt, which amounted to more than $770 million. Station Casinos LLC was formed to buy back most bankrupt assets from the original Station Casinos Inc. In March 2011, the newly formed company announced an agreement to buy the Green Valley Ranch for $500 million, with an option for the Greenspuns to maintain an ownership stake. Unsecured creditors challenged the sale, believing that the purchase price was too low. Nevertheless, the sale was approved in June 2011, with Station taking over full ownership.

=== Later years ===
The Original Pancake House closed at the end of 2011, after its lease expired. A 400-seat bingo hall was added in 2013. A $20 million renovation began in 2014, and was expected to conclude the next year. It included several new restaurants such as Pizza Rock, as well as a keno lounge, and a new LED sign along the Las Vegas Beltway. The former Whiskey Sky space, which had only been used for corporate events in recent years, was replaced with meeting space and a business center in 2017.

In November 2017, employees voted for unionization through the Culinary Workers Union. Out of 730 workers, 78 percent voted in favor of the union. Station was disappointed with the result and "the manner in which the union conducted the Green Valley Ranch election campaign". The company filed a complaint with the National Labor Relations Board, alleging that the union forced employees to vote in favor of unionization. The Culinary union ultimately prevailed.

By 2020, the resort had renovated its Presidential Suite, which had not been rented out for nearly 10 years. The resort's wedding chapel was also converted into a suite. In mid-2023, the casino added a new bar as part of a revamping of its amenities, scheduled to conclude in early 2024. The project will also include new restaurants in the former buffet space and add new high-limit gaming areas.

== The District at Green Valley Ranch ==
American Nevada's mixed-use project, The District at Green Valley Ranch, opened its first phase in 2004, directly east of the resort. It includes retail, restaurants, office space, and condominiums. A second phase, just east of the original, was opened in 2005.

== Television appearances ==
- The series CSI: Crime Scene Investigation filmed at Green Valley Ranch in 2003.
- During its first season in 2003, the series Las Vegas sometimes filmed at Green Valley Ranch, which stood in as the fictional Montecito resort.
- The 2004 reality television series American Casino, based on the daily tasks of various casino employees, was filmed entirely at Green Valley Ranch.
- The 2004 series Dr. Vegas shot some scenes at the resort.
- The soap opera Passions shot at Green Valley Ranch in 2005.
- Rahman "Rock" Harper, the winner of the 2007 third season of Hell's Kitchen, was rewarded with a one-year contract as head chef at the resort's Terra Verde restaurant.

== Entertainers ==
A music venue, the Grand Events Center, opened in December 2004. Another venue, the Ovation Lounge, opened in May 2007, with seating for 500 people. It often featured free shows. The Sin City Sinners began performing regularly at Ovation starting in 2009. A year later, the resort was named "casino of the year" by the Academy of Country Music, for its hosting of country musicians, including Blake Shelton, Lady Antebellum, Montgomery Gentry and Toby Keith. Other notable entertainers have included The Fixx, Julio Iglesias, Asia, and Michael Grimm. Ovation closed in November 2012, and was replaced by the bingo hall.
