= Sugar (Maroon 5 song) =

Single by Maroon 5

from the album V
- Released: January 13, 2015
- Recorded: 2014
- Studio: Conway, Hollywood, California; Luke's in the Boo, Malibu, California; The Mothership, Sherman Oaks, California
- Genre: Disco; funk-pop; soul
- Length: 3:55
- Label: 222; Interscope
- Songwriters: Mike Posner; Adam Levine; Joshua Coleman; Lukasz Gottwald; Jacob Kasher Hindlin; Henry Walter
- Producers: Ammo; Cirkut

Maroon 5 singles chronology
"Animals" (2014)	"Sugar" (2015)	"This Summer's Gonna Hurt like a Motherfucker" (2015)

Music video
- "Sugar" on YouTube

"Sugar" is a song by the American rock band Maroon 5 from their fifth studio album V (2014). It was written by Mike Posner, Adam Levine, Dr. Luke, and Jacob Kasher Hindlin together with its producers Ammo and Cirkut. It was sent to contemporary hit radio in the United States, as the third single from the album on January 13, 2015. "Sugar" is a disco, funk-pop and soul song that features a wide range of instruments including percussion, keyboards and guitars. Commercially, the song peaked at number two on the US Billboard Hot 100 and became the band's third top 10 single from V, and eighth consecutive top 10 entry. "Sugar" is the 68th song in history to score at least 20 weeks in the top 10 of the Hot 100. The song was certified Diamond by the Recording Industry Association of America (RIAA) in 2022, as Maroon 5's third certified single.

Film director David Dobkin shot the accompanying music video for the single in Los Angeles. Inspired by the 2005 romantic comedy Wedding Crashers, it features Maroon 5 crashing weddings that happened in the city. The video premiered on January 14, 2015, and received its television premiere on January 17. A reality television series based on the music video was released on YouTube in August 2018. The remix versions of the song were released, one featuring rapper Nicki Minaj on March 10, and the other by Matt Medved (also known as Sicarii) on November 9, 2015, respectively.

"Sugar" received a nomination for Best Pop Duo/Group Performance at the 58th Grammy Awards.

== Background ==
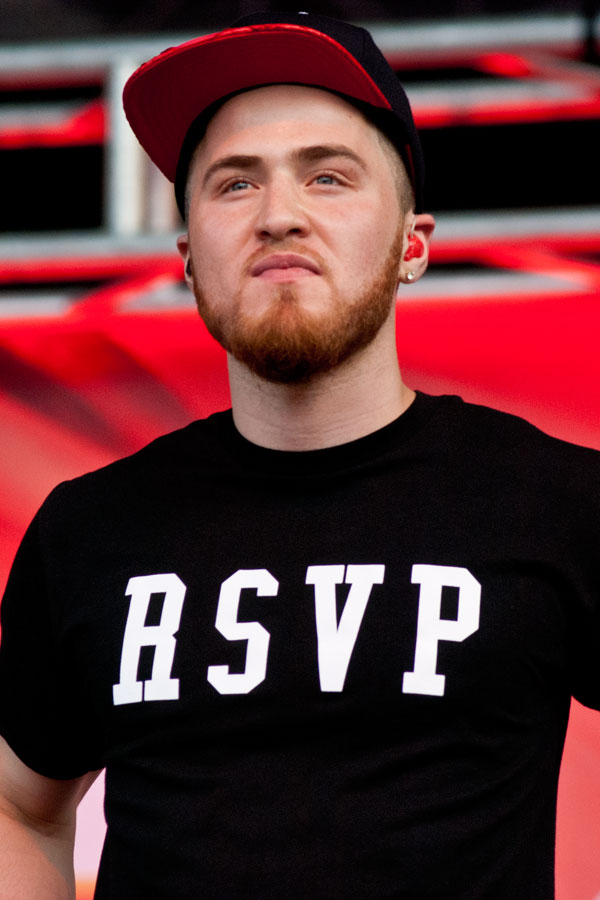
Mike Posner originally wrote "Sugar" for his planned album Pages, but forwarded it to Maroon 5 after the album's release was cancelled.

Since the release of his debut studio album, 31 Minutes to Takeoff (2010), American singer and songwriter Mike Posner started writing material to be included in his follow-up record, titled Pages. One of the songs set to be included in the album was "Sugar", which Adam Levine heard and wanted to have it on the upcoming Maroon 5 album, but Posner declined. However, in 2014, he switched labels and announced that Pages would not be launched, and instead a new body of music would be released. In an interview with, Billboard, Posner elaborated: "Well, this is just gonna sit on my laptop' so I gave it to them and when they recorded the song Adam added his flavor to it and he wrote on it as well, lyrically and some melodic things, and he really sang it well. I'm a big fan, so I'm glad they did it". The final version of "Sugar" was written by Levine, Posner, Lukasz Gottwald, Jacob Kasher Hindlin, Joshua Coleman and Henry Walter. The production of the song was done by the latter two under their respective production names Ammo and Cirkut.

The lead vocals were sung by Levine, with backing vocals provided by Posner. "Sugar" was recorded at Conway Recording Studios in Hollywood, Dr. Luke in the Boo in Malibu and The Mothership in Sherman Oaks while it was mixed at MixStar Studios in Virginia Beach. Doug McKean, Clint Gibbs, Noah Passovoy and Jonathan Sher all served as engineers of the song, while John Armstrong, Eric Eylands, Rachael Findlen and Cameron Montgomery helped them finish the engineering, serving as additional engineers. John Hanes was the mixing engineer while all the instrumentation and programming was provided by Maroon 5, Dr. Luke, Ammo and Cirkut. Artie Smith was the instrument technician. "Sugar" was announced to be the third single from V in November 2014. Interscope Records distributed the song to contemporary hit radio stations in the United States on January 13, 2015. The same day, the band unveiled the official artwork for the single that features red-colored lips holding a sugar cube; Mike Wass of Idolator called it "candy-colored".

== Music and lyrics ==
"Sugar" (2015)
A 23-second sample of "Sugar", a disco, funk-pop and soul song that features a composition similar to the works of artists Bruno Mars and Katy Perry.

"Sugar" is a disco, funk-pop, and soul song with a length of three minutes and fifty-six seconds. It features guitars provided by James Valentine, Jesse Carmichael and Dr. Luke, bass played by Mickey Madden, and synth bass provided by Dr. Luke. The drums were provided by Matt Flynn and Cirkut while PJ Morton, Jesse Carmichael, Dr. Luke, Ammo, and Cirkut contributed to the keyboards and synthesizers. One writer at Popmatters feels that musically, "Sugar" combines the grooves of the funk and "synth-driven" 1980s music. According to Kobalt Music Publishing's digital sheet music for the song, "Sugar" is composed in the key of D♭ major and set in common time signature, and has a moderate groove of 120 beats per minute. Levine's vocals span from the low note of D♭_{3} to the high note of F♭_{5}, over one octave higher.

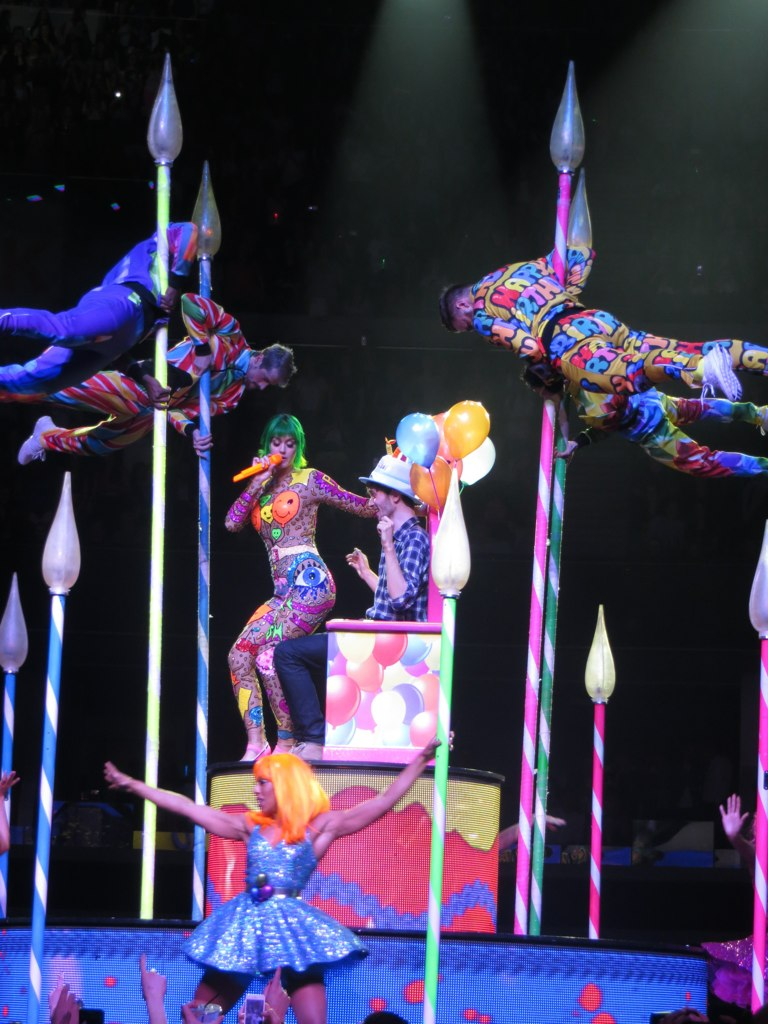
Critics noted similarity with "Birthday" by Katy Perry.

Kyle Anderson of Entertainment Weekly noted the reminiscence of "Sugar" to the music of singer Bruno Mars. Brad Wete of Billboard magazine compared the song's production to that of Katy Perry's 2014 single "Birthday", which was also produced by Cirkut, together with Dr. Luke. Similarly, Rolling Stone's Jon Dolan compared the song to the works of Perry and wrote that the "funk-guitar licks zip across a spry, sun-drunk groove as Levine sings..." Lyrically, Levine sings the lines to his romantic interest, "I just wanna be there where you are/And I gotta get one little taste". The song uses the word "sugar" to describe both the love interest's sweet nature, and coitus. Jon Caramanica of The New York Times wrote that on the Levine sounds most lecherous while singing the lyrics "I want that red velvet, I want that sugar sweet". According to him "he croons so cleanly it's possible to imagine that he is truly singing about cake".

== Critical reception ==
"Sugar" received generally positive reviews from music critics. In a review of V, Stephen Thomas Erlewine of AllMusic wrote that the best moments on the album "are when Maroon 5 embrace the tuneful, slightly soulful adult contemporary pop band they've always been, as they do on 'Sugar'" among other songs. Alexa Tietjen of VH1 stated that the track is a "radio-friendly pop song". Mike Wass of Idolator labeled the song a "ridiculously catchy jam". Similarly, Saeed Saeed of The National called the song a "highlight" on V and further wrote that it "has a bullseye of a chorus that will have you singing along immediately". PopMatters' Annie Galvin praised the song and wrote that it "hits a sweet spot by layering a subtly funky guitar pulse over gossamer synths and multiple tracks of Levine's easy-on-the-ears upper range". On the negative side, Anderson of Entertainment Weekly called the song "simultaneously empty and cluttered". In 2022, Billboard and American Songwriter ranked the song number eight and number nine, respectively, on their lists of the 10 greatest Maroon 5 songs.

== Chart performance ==
Following the release of V, "Sugar" debuted and peaked at number 13 and number 77 on the South Korean International and South Korean Gaon Chart respectively. After the song and its accompanying video was released, it gathered attention at the digital media outlets. Billboard predicted that in its first week the song is set to debut in the top 25 with digital sales of over 150,000 copies. For the week dated January 31, 2015, "Sugar" debuted at number eight on the US Billboard Hot 100 chart. It became Maroon 5's third song to debut in the top ten of the chart; their previous singles "Moves like Jagger" (2011) debuted same at number eight and "Payphone" (2012) debuted higher, at number three. Consequently, it became the band's 11th top ten hit and their eighth in row. The song peaked at number one on the Billboard Twitter Top Tracks chart, their second number one after "Maps" (2014). "Sugar" peaked at number two on the chart for four consecutive weeks, behind "Uptown Funk" by Mark Ronson featuring Bruno Mars. The song spent 21 weeks in the top ten of the chart before falling 10–12 on the chart issue dated June 27, 2015. This marks the longest time the band has spent in the top ten of the chart, along with "Moves Like Jagger" and "One More Night" (2012), which also spent 21 weeks in the top ten. They have since surpassed this feat with their "Girls Like You" single featuring Cardi B in 2018, which spent more than 30 weeks in the top ten. As of August 2015, it has sold 3.3 million copies in the United States.

== Music video ==
=== Development and concept ===
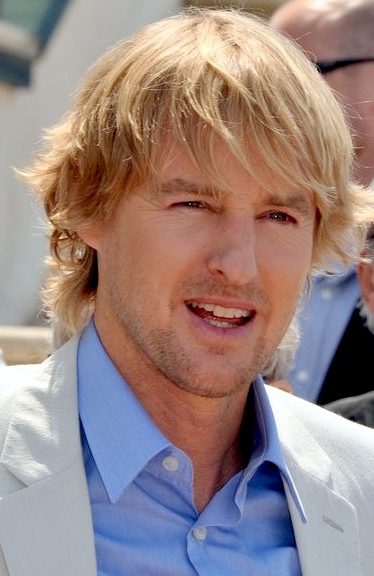
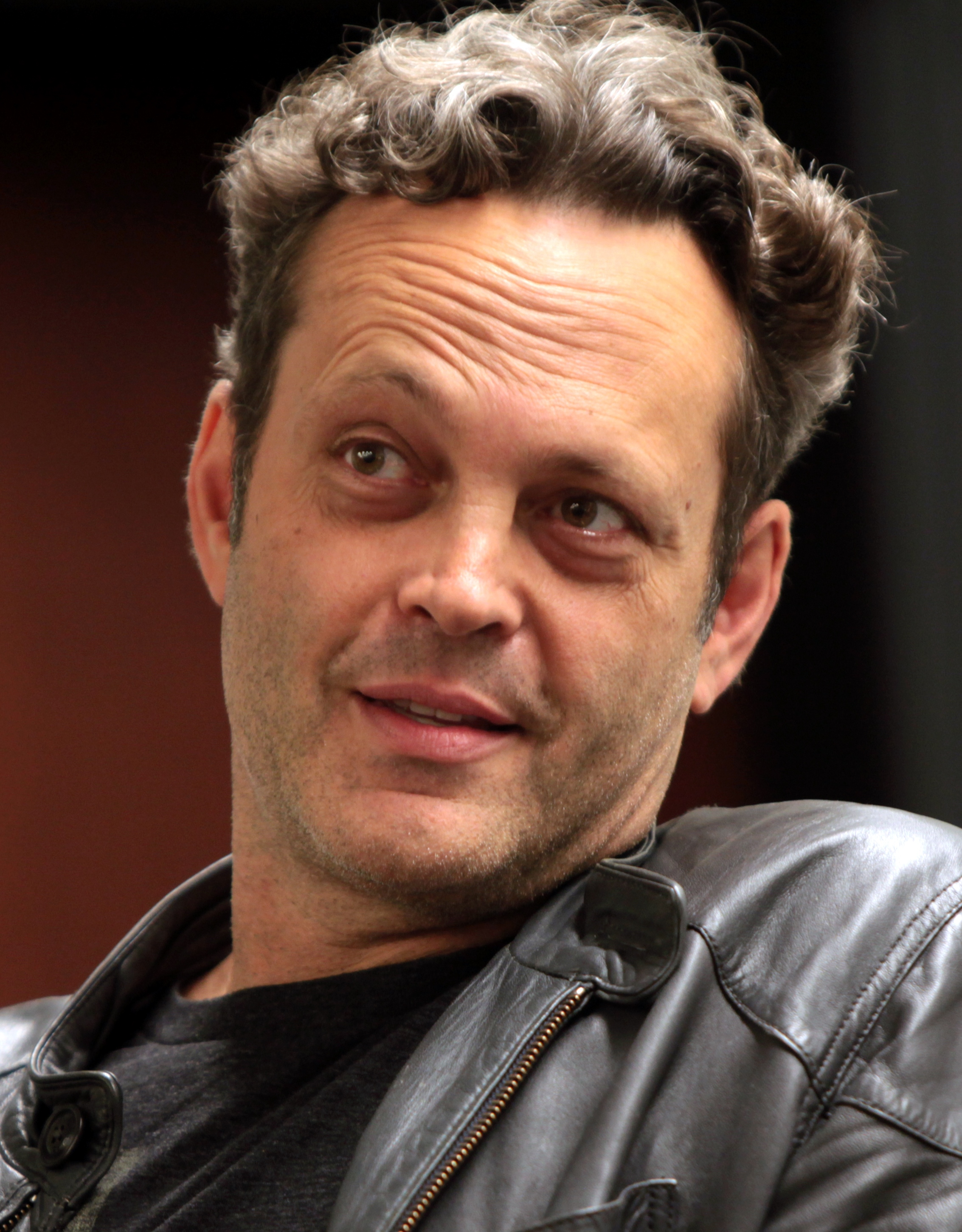
The plot of the music video was based on the story of the 2005 romantic comedy Wedding Crashers starring Owen Wilson (left) and Vince Vaughn (right).

In 2014, film director David Dobkin was in Rome, Italy, for the premiere of his film, The Judge. During his stay there, he received an e-mail from Levine asking him to direct the band's new music video: "I've known Adam for over a decade. I met him before the first Maroon 5 album came out. My wife's parents are best friends with his grandparents and I spend Christmas with him every year. So we've known each other for a long time and always talked about doing something together but were never able to get our schedules lined up". After he agreed to film the video for "Sugar", they started discussing ideas for its concept. Dobkin wanted the video to be about the band's connection with their audience and wanted elements of real people and Los Angeles, Levine's hometown. In an interview with VH1, the director revealed: "Then the idea came up of, what if they went to real weddings and showed up as the surprise wedding band?". When Levine heard the idea, he loved it.

In 2005, Dobkin directed the film Wedding Crashers in which Owen Wilson and Vince Vaughn played the characters of John Beckwith and Jeremy Grey. They star as "two dashing rogues who sneak into nuptials in search of lovelorn bridesmaids". The film received positive reviews from movie critics and was a box office success earning over $285 million worldwide. Dobkin revealed: "For 10 years everyone asks me to do something related to that movie. I've never wanted to go back there, just because it's something that worked so well. But we locked in on this idea and thought it would be great. And then it was like, holy shit, how do we pull this off?" After the concept was decided on, they started preparing the wedding crashes. At the beginning, Dobkin thought that no one should know about the crash and filming. After some rethinking, however, he decided that at least one person should know about it. So they informed only the grooms and decided to keep the secret from the brides. The grooms were not, however, told the name of the band; they were only told that they are very popular and had won several Grammy Awards. The next step was deciding how, at the beginning of each performance, the band would hide. Dobkin designed and had built a drop-down tent, where a button was pressed, causing the curtains drop to the floor. After that, Dobkin visited many wedding planners in Los Angeles and visited a number of the locations where weddings would be happening, in order to decide which location at the site would be the best for setting up the tent.

=== Filming ===
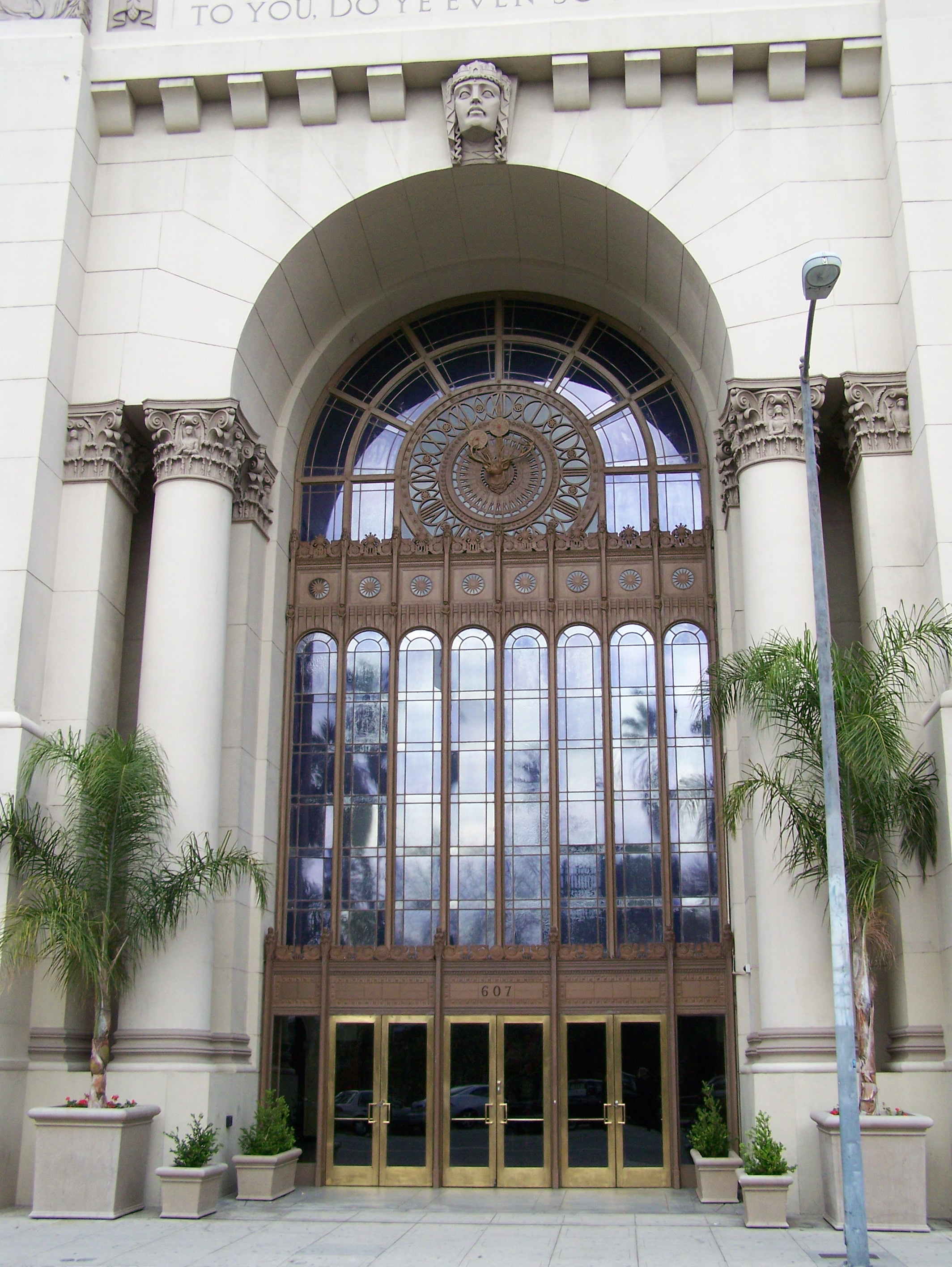
One of the filming locations was the ballroom at the Park Plaza Hotel.

The music video was filmed in Los Angeles, California. It was shot at several ballrooms, located at various locations around the city, where weddings were happening. One of the ballrooms was at the Park Plaza Hotel, a very popular location for celebrations and parties. A week before filming the video commenced, Dobkin went to see the band, who were rehearsing for the visual. During the meeting, Levine questioned the concept: "What if people don't like us? What happens if we ruin the bride's moment?" That was the first time they started wondering, "What if we're ruining someone's most special day?" In order to prevent that from happening, Levine got an idea: after performing "Sugar", he and the band's guitarist, James Valentine would perform an acoustic version of their 2004 single "She Will Be Loved" just for the bride and the groom. The dance floor would be cleared of everyone except for the newlyweds and the song would be another traditional "First Dance" for the newlyweds. According to Dobkin, that was a very good idea.

A few days before shooting began, most of the grooms started getting nervous and wanted to cancel the wedding crash. Dobkin met with each of them and talked them out of canceling. At one point, he told them that the mysterious band is in fact Maroon 5. Eventually, it turned out that most of them were fans of Maroon 5 and Adam from The Voice and had positive responses for performing "She Will Be Loved" after shooting "Sugar". Prior to the filming of each sequence, the production team had approximately 20 minutes to enter the location and begin building the tent, while the band tried to get in unnoticed. During the first wedding, which was a Jewish wedding, the bride and the groom were sitting in their chairs and while the tent was being constructed, Dobkin received a call on his radio saying that the band was stuck in the elevator. Eventually, they got out of the elevator and had to run up nine flights of stairs to get to the ballroom in time for filming. Dobkin recalled that when the performance of "Sugar" finished, the members of the band looked at him like they wanted to say, "Oh my God. That was awesome! Where's the next one?"

=== Release ===
In a press release for the video, Levine stated: "It was an out of body experience. I had no idea I would be affected by the overwhelming reactions we received from the couples and guests. Being able to create an unforgettable experience for several people was the highlight of it all". He also spoke with Kevin Frazier of Entertainment Tonight and told him how it was stressful to arrange the whole video. However, the brides and grooms were shocked that the band crashed their wedding. He added: "It was a lot of fun. It felt good to kind of surprise these people and make them happy. Happy that they liked our band too. It would have been a total disaster [if not]". A representative for Duke Photography, who photographed the weddings, has said: "It was an incredible surprise and everyone at the wedding is going to cherish those memories". The video for "Sugar" premiered on the day after the single, via the band's Vevo channel on YouTube. It was available for digital download the same day, via the iTunes Store in Canada and the United States. It received its television premiere on January 17 at 9AM (EST) and won VH1 Top 20 Video Countdown.

=== Synopsis ===
The video starts with the members of Maroon 5 leaving the Carondelet House, with Levine saying: "It's December 6, 2014. We're going to drive across L.A. and hit every wedding we possibly can". After his introduction, Levine gets into the car and starts driving. Subsequently, a van parks near the Park Plaza Hotel where a wedding is taking place in the ballroom. A group gets out of the van, enters the building and starts constructing a secret stage, surprising guests, who wonder what's happening. One stands up and starts anxiously questioning the builders, while scenes are intercut with Maroon 5 driving around the city and Levine singing the song lyrics. The band arrives in front of the hotel and sneaks into the building, ducking behind the white curtains where the instruments are set up. As they finish their preparations, the bride and the groom are asked to stand in front of the stage. The curtain drops to reveal the band playing "Sugar" and the couple screams happily while confused guests look on. Afterwards, the unwitting wedding party audience starts smiling and all the guests get up to dance to the song.

Scenes are intercut with the band driving to another wedding and sneaking inside the building where it's taking place. A similar situation occurs as they appear before the guests, who are both surprised and delighted. While the band is driving around Los Angeles, young women pulling up to a traffic light beside them recognize the group and take selfies with Valentine. During the last part of the video, the band crashes five more weddings, leaving the attendees utterly surprised. The video concludes with the wedding guests applauding the band, while Maroon 5's members toast, embrace, and cheer with the newlyweds.

=== Analysis and reception ===
According to Ryan Reed of Rolling Stone, the video showed the band channeling the roles of actors Owen Wilson and Vince Vaughn in Wedding Crashers while surprising the audience with its performance of "Sugar". The Daily Telegraph's Catherine Gee felt the video proved that "not a soul in Los Angeles would mind if the rock band arrived at their reception unannounced and performed their new single". Elias Leight of Billboard noted that the reaction of the people in the weddings ranged from screaming and pointing to shouting, and finally dancing. He also noted that the women were quicker to recognize Levine than the men. Melodi Smith of CNN wrote that the looks of faces in the rooms are "priceless: delight, tears, confusion". Jennifer Maas of Entertainment Weekly noted how every groom should be embarrassed by Levine hugging his bride after the performance and wrote: "All in all, if this is somehow an authentic stunt, the music video director totally stole the thunder of those couples' wedding videographers".

Steven Gottlieb of Video Static called the video "fun" and a "gambit" with a goal just to surprise the wedding and not to pick up drunk bridesmaids, a reference to Wedding Crashers. Elizabeth Vanmetre of Daily News wrote that "having Adam Levine crash your wedding would be the icing on any wedding cake". Time's Laura Stampler reviewed the video and wrote that although the video will not make you mad like Maroon 5's previous visual for "Animals" in which Levine stalks a woman who is played by his real wife, model Behati Prinsloo, while covered in blood, "but you'll probably still be annoyed". She further stated that "I do" is the happiest moment in your life, but seeing Levine singing the lyrics "hotter than southern California Bay" to the new wife "is the happiest moment in your life". According to Leigh Weingus of The Huffington Post in the video, Levine made the wedding crashing a lot more "awesome" than Wilson and Vaughn. Paul Grein of Yahoo! Music's Chart Watch labeled the video as a little bit "corny", but according to him it's also "cute" and "fun".

As of February 2026, the video is YouTube's 22nd-most viewed video, with over 4.2 billion views, and is the group's most viewed video.

=== Staging accusations ===
Several sources including Life & Style, Rolling Stone and Cosmopolitan reported that the video was allegedly staged and filmed over the course of three days at the same location. According to these sources, the first groom was played by New Zealand actor Nico Evers-Swindell, while actor Eric Satterberg and former America's Next Top Model contestant Raina Hein also played the roles of guest and bride, respectively. Additionally, two of the actors who played the role of parents said: "The Buzz on the internet is whether the Maroon 5 'Sugar' music video is real or staged. We played the parents of the Asian bride and yes, everything was staged".

Carly Mallenbaum of USA Today also analyzed the situation and wrote that although it is possible that some of the weddings were staged, at least two of them were real. She spoke to wedding photographer Eric Parsons, who told her he was shooting one of the weddings when Maroon 5 made the surprise appearance: "Sharon [the bride] knew nothing about it. She's the one who mouths 'what the fuck' in the video". Another photographer, Duke Khodaverdian, was shooting another wedding: "Around 10:30, some producer came up and said, 'Ladies and gentlemen, we have a great surprise for you'. Everyone went berserk. The room was electric". The scenes where the band toasts the newlyweds with cognac were filmed at the wedding in which Khodaverdian was taking photos.

Video footage on YouTube contains footage of two of the real weddings crashed in the final video, including couple number 5 (Martin and Sharis) and number 7 (Ryan and Melanie). Eric Parsons' published photograph and testimony confirms that the wedding of couple number 4 (Sharon and Steve) was also genuine. The published article confirms that the groom, Steve Weaver, was a friend of the video producer and was in on the setup, though his bride was unaware.

=== Fan video ===
A fan video version of the song was released on January 21, 2015. It features fans from around the world are lip-syncing and dancing to the song with the use of JamCam app.

== Live performances ==
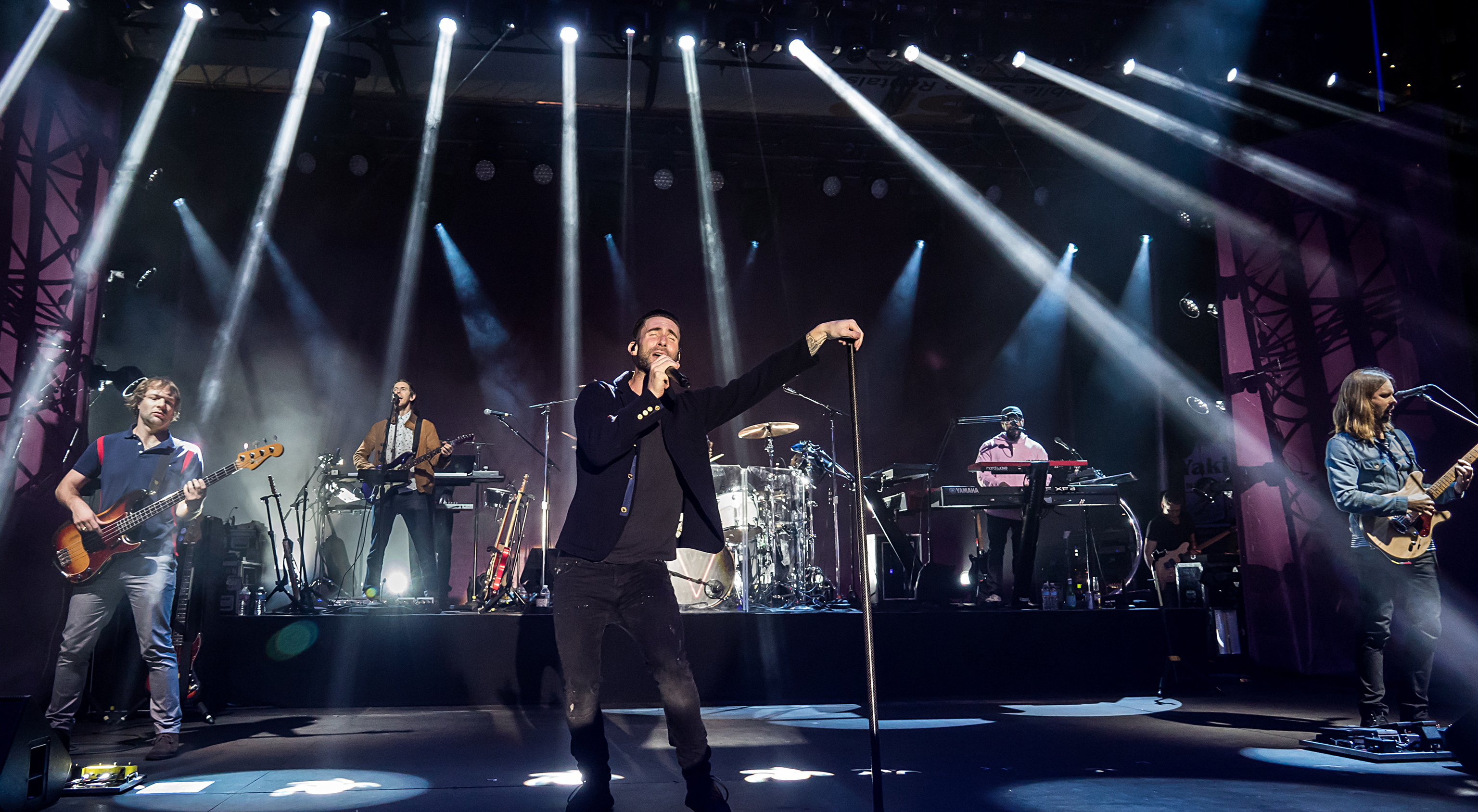
Maroon 5 performing live from Los Angeles in 2016.

Maroon 5 performed "Sugar" in Puerto Rico for the first edition of Victoria's Secret Swim Special, which aired on February 26, 2015. They also played the song in various appearances, such as the eighth season of The Voice and the television talk shows Jimmy Kimmel Live!; and Alan Carr: Chatty Man, respectively. The band performed the song live for their worldwide tour, Maroon V Tour (2015–2018). On March 20, 2026, Maroon 5 played "Sugar" for A Night of Extra event by Clarins, at the Academy Museum of Motion Pictures in Los Angeles.

== In other media ==
"Sugar" was featured on advertisements for the 2015 Nissan GT-R. The song appeared on the band's greatest hits album Singles.

== Awards and nominations ==
Year	Ceremony	Category	Result	Ref.
2015	MTV Millennial Awards	International Hit of the Year	Nominated	
2015	MTV Video Music Awards	Best Pop Video	Nominated	
2015	MTV Video Music Awards Japan	Best Pop Video – International	Nominated	
2015	NRJ Music Awards	Video of the Year	Nominated	
2015	Radio Disney Music Awards	So Happy – Best Song That Makes You Smile	Won	
2015	Teen Choice Awards	Choice Music Single: Group	Nominated	
2015	Teen Choice Awards	Choice Music: Love Song	Nominated	
2016	APRA Awards	International Work of the Year	Nominated	
2016	ASCAP Pop Music Awards	Most Performed Song	Won	
2016	BMI Pop Awards	Award Winning Song	Won	
2016	Grammy Awards	Best Pop Duo/Group Performance	Nominated	
2016	SOCAN Awards	Pop or Rock Music Award	Won	
2016	SOCAN Awards	Online Streaming Music Award	Won	

== Track listing ==
Digital download

1. "Sugar" – 3:55

Digital download – Remix

1. "Sugar" (featuring Nicki Minaj) – 3:55

Digital download – Sicarii Remix

1. "Sugar" (Sicarii Remix) – 3:31

Digital download – Slaptop Remix

1. "Sugar" (Slaptop Remix) – 4:05

== Credits and personnel ==
Credits adapted from the liner notes of V.

Locations

- Recorded at Conway Recording Studios Hollywood, CA; Luke's in the Boo Malibu, CA; The Mothership Sherman Oaks, CA
- Mixed at MixStar Studios, Virginia Beach, VA

Personnel

- Songwriting – Adam Levine, Joshua Coleman, Lukasz Gottwald, Jacob Kasher Hindlin, Mike Posner, Henry Walter
- Production – Ammo, Cirkut
- Vocals – Adam Levine
- Additional vocals – Mike Posner
- Engineering – Doug McKean, Clint Gibbs, Noah Passovoy, Jonathan Sher
- Assistant engineers – John Armstrong, Eric Eylands, Rachael Findlen, Cameron Montgomery
- Mix engineer – John Hanes
- Instruments and programming – Maroon 5, Dr. Luke, Ammo, Cirkut
- Guitar – James Valentine, Dr. Luke and Jesse Carmichael
- Bass guitar – Mickey Madden
- Synth bass – Dr. Luke
- Drums – Matt Flynn and Cirkut
- Keyboards/synthesizers – Jesse Carmichael, PJ Morton, Dr. Luke, Ammo, Cirkut
- Instrument Technician – Artie Smith

== Charts ==
=== Weekly charts ===
Chart (2015–2016)	Peak position
Australia (ARIA)	6
Austria (Ö3 Austria Top 40)	25
Belgium (Ultratop 50 Flanders)	24
Belgium (Ultratop 50 Wallonia)	24
Bulgaria (IFPI)	2
Canada Hot 100 (Billboard)	2
Canada AC (Billboard)	1
Canada CHR/Top 40 (Billboard)	1
Canada Hot AC (Billboard)	1
CIS Airplay (TopHit)	26
Czech Republic Airplay (ČNS IFPI)	8
Czech Republic Singles Digital (ČNS IFPI)	1
Denmark (Tracklisten)	5
Euro Digital Song Sales (Billboard)	11
Finland (Suomen virallinen lista)	11
France (SNEP)	15
Germany (GfK)	41
Hungary (Rádiós Top 40)	2
Hungary (Single Top 40)	2
Hungary (Stream Top 40)	1
Iceland (RÚV)	26
Ireland (IRMA)	5
Israel (Media Forest)	3
Italy (FIMI)	6
Italian Airplay (EarOne)	6
Japan Hot 100 (Billboard)	19
Lebanon (OLT 20)	1
Mexico (Billboard Mexican Airplay)	1
Mexico Anglo (Monitor Latino)	1
Netherlands (Dutch Top 40)	9
Netherlands (Single Top 100)	10
New Zealand (Recorded Music NZ)	3
Norway (VG-lista)	11
Poland Airplay (ZPAV)	3
Portugal (AFP)	66
Russia Airplay (TopHit)	41
Scottish Singles Sales (Official Charts)	6
Slovakia Airplay (ČNS IFPI)	1
Slovakia Singles Digital (ČNS IFPI)	2
Slovenia (SloTop50)	9
South Africa Airplay (EMA)	1
South Korea (Gaon Music Chart)	17
Spain (Promusicae)	12
Sweden (Sverigetopplistan)	17
Switzerland (Schweizer Hitparade)	10
UK Singles (Official Charts)	7
Ukraine Airplay (TopHit)	52
US Billboard Hot 100	2
US Adult Contemporary (Billboard)	2
US Adult Pop Airplay (Billboard)	1
US Dance Club Songs (Billboard)	36
US Latin Pop Airplay (Billboard)	35
US Pop Airplay (Billboard)	1
US Rhythmic Airplay (Billboard)	23

=== Weekly charts ===
Chart (2025)	Peak position
Japan Hot Overseas (Billboard Japan)	5

=== Year-end charts ===
Chart (2015)	Position
Australia (ARIA)	13
Belgium (Ultratop Flanders)	80
Belgium (Ultratop Wallonia)	52
Brazil (Crowley)	39
Canada (Canadian Hot 100)	5
Denmark (Tracklisten)	23
France (SNEP)	38
Hungary (Rádiós Top 40)	38
Hungary (Single Top 40)	23
Israel (Media Forest)	10
Italy (FIMI)	21
Japan (Japan Hot 100)	34
Netherlands (Dutch Top 40)	57
Netherlands (Single Top 100)	35
New Zealand (Recorded Music NZ)	7
Poland (ZPAV)	27
Slovenia (SloTop50)	38
Spain (PROMUSICAE)	23
South Korea (Gaon Music Chart)	9
Sweden (Sverigetopplistan)	68
Switzerland (Schweizer Hitparade)	33
UK Singles (OCC)	13
US Billboard Hot 100	5
US Adult Contemporary (Billboard)	2
US Adult Top 40 (Billboard)	4
US Dance/Mix Show Airplay (Billboard)	19
US Mainstream Top 40 (Billboard)	5
Chart (2016)	Position
Argentina (Monitor Latino)	61
US Adult Contemporary (Billboard)	27

=== Decade-end charts ===
Chart (2010–2019)	Position
US Billboard Hot 100	76

== Certifications and sales ==
Region	Certification	Certified units/sales
Australia (ARIA)	11× Platinum	770,000^{‡}
Belgium (BRMA)	Gold	10,000^{‡}
Brazil (Pro-Música Brasil)	9× Diamond	2,250,000^{‡}
Canada (Music Canada)	Platinum	80,000^{*}
Denmark (IFPI Danmark)	2× Platinum	120,000^{^}
France (SNEP)	Gold	75,000^{*}
Germany (BVMI)	Gold	200,000^{‡}
Italy (FIMI)	3× Platinum	150,000^{‡}
Japan (RIAJ)	Platinum	250,000^{*}
Mexico (AMPROFON)	Diamond+2× Platinum+Gold	450,000^{‡}
New Zealand (RMNZ)	6× Platinum	180,000^{‡}
Poland (ZPAV)	3× Platinum	60,000^{*}
South Korea	—	2,500,000
Spain (Promusicae)	2× Platinum	120,000^{‡}
Sweden (GLF)	2× Platinum	80,000^{‡}
United Kingdom (BPI)	3× Platinum	1,460,000
United States (RIAA)	11× Platinum	11,000,000^{‡}
Streaming
Japan (RIAJ)	Platinum	100,000,000^{†}
South Korea	—	100,000,000
^{*} Sales figures based on certification alone.^{^} Shipments figures based on certification alone.^{‡} Sales+streaming figures based on certification alone.^{†} Streaming-only figures based on certification alone.

== Release history ==
Region	Date	Format(s)	Version	Label(s)	Ref.
United States	January 13, 2015	Contemporary hit radio	Original	222; Interscope	
Italy	February 20, 2015	Contemporary hit radio	Original	Universal	
Canada	March 10, 2015	Digital download	Nicki Minaj Remix	222; Interscope	
United States	March 10, 2015	Digital download	Nicki Minaj Remix	222; Interscope	
United States	September 1, 2015	Digital download	Slaptop Remix	222; Interscope	
United States	November 9, 2015	Digital download	Sicarii Remix	222; Interscope	

== See also ==
- List of highest-certified singles in Australia
- List of best-selling singles in Brazil
- List of most-viewed YouTube videos
