= Jen Kramer =

American magician

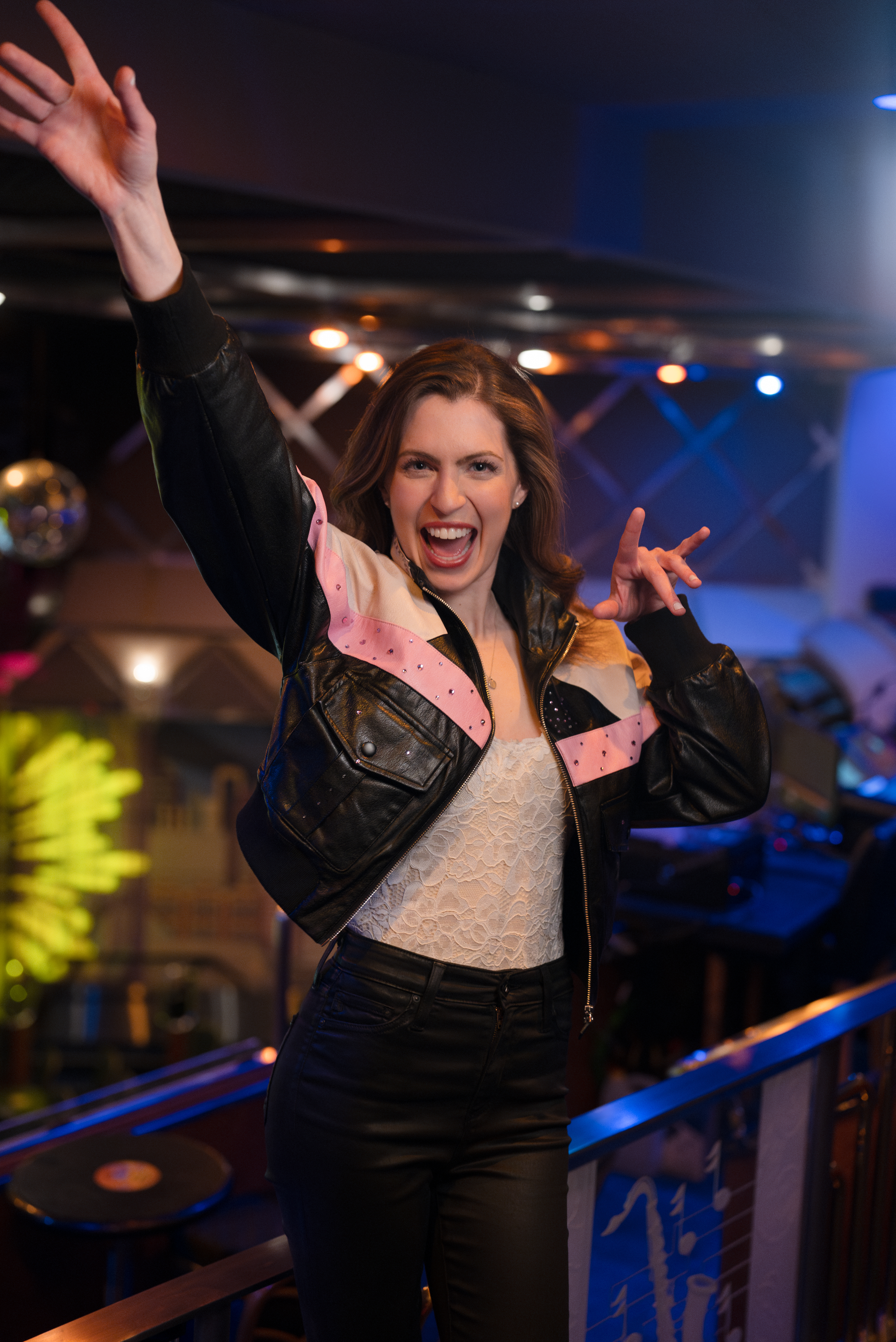
- Kramer in Las Vegas in 2025
- Education: Yale University (BA)
- Occupation: Magician

Jen Kramer is an American magician. Since 2018, she has performed her magic show, The Magic of Jen Kramer, at Westgate Las Vegas. Her sets include card tricks and mentalism.

== Early life and education ==
On her tenth birthday, Kramer was given a "book about magic" from her uncle, after which she "became fascinated by magic... joined a young magicians' group, went to magic camp and began performing anywhere and everywhere I could" according to VEGAS INC.

Kramer attended Yale University, where she founded the Yale Magic Society, and graduated with a degree in theater studies. She also interned for magician Nathan Burton, in addition to doing her own shows in Southern Nevada.

== Career ==
In 2019, VEGAS INC. named Kramer in its 40 Under 40. In 2024, Las Vegas Weekly named her Best Magician in its 2024 Best of Vegas–Reader's Choice. The International Magicians Society named her Female Magician of the Year.

As of 2025, Kramer was "the only female magician currently headlining her own Las Vegas magic show" according to BroadwayWorld. In addition to her years of performances in Las Vegas, Nevada, Kramer has also appeared in Penn & Teller: Fool Us, Masters of Illusion, and other shows. She is also on the board of Magicians Without Borders.
