= VEGAS.com =

American travel agency

Vegas.com LLC
- Industry: Online Commerce; Hotel booking Travel booking Ticketing
- Founded: 1998; 28 years ago
- Headquarters: Las Vegas, Nevada, United States
- Website: www.vegas.com

VEGAS.com, LLC is a destination-specific Online Travel Agency (OTA) founded in 1998 and headquartered in Las Vegas, Nevada. VEGAS.com provides extensive travel content and books discounted travel products including hotel rooms, air-hotel packages, show tickets, tours, dining, golf, and other activities exclusively for the Las Vegas destination.

== History ==
VEGAS.com was one of The Greenspun Corporation's family of companies, which include The Las Vegas Sun, a newspaper distributed in Las Vegas. In 2005, a Chicago Tribune article ranked Vegas.com among the 50 most popular travel websites.

In 2015, Las Vegas-based Remark Media acquired Vegas.com with the goal of making it the "go-to booking destination for new millennial travelers." In 2023, Remark Media (renamed Remark Holdings) sold it to Vivid Seats, the online technology and event ticket marketplace.

== See also ==
- Vegas.com 500
