= Henderson Home News =

The Henderson Home News was a community newspaper based in Henderson, Nevada. It began as a separate section of the Boulder City News in 1948 (78 years ago), and became its own publication in 1950. The Henderson Home News had a close, working alliance with the larger Las Vegas Sun throughout its existence. The Las Vegas Sun later acquired the Henderson Home News outright and closed the smaller newspaper in 2010 (16 years ago).

Lorna Kesterson worked as a reporter and, later, managing editor of the Henderson Home News for nearly thirty years. She was later elected the first female Mayor of Henderson in 1985.
