= Lorna Kesterson =

American mayor

Mayor of Henderson, Nevada
- In office 1985–1993
- Preceded by: Leroy Zike
- Succeeded by: Robert A. Groesbeck

Personal details
- Born: December 30, 1925 St. George, Utah, U.S.
- Died: January 16, 2012 (aged 86) Henderson, Nevada, U.S.
- Spouse: Robert Kesterson (died)
- Education: Utah State University
- Occupation: Journalist; newspaper editor

Lorna J. Kesterson (December 30, 1925 – January 16, 2012) was an American journalist, newspaper editor and politician. She served as the first female mayor of the city of Henderson, Nevada, for two consecutive four-year terms from 1985 to 1993. She was the first and only woman to be Henderson's mayor until Debra March was sworn in to office in 2017. Kesterson was also a longtime reporter and managing editor for the Henderson Home News, a local community newspaper.

== Biography ==
=== Early life ===
Kesterson was born Lorna Jolley in St. George, Utah, on December 30, 1925, to parents Donal and Nora Jolley. She was raised in Springdale, Utah. She moved to Boulder City, Nevada, ranch with her family during the 1930s and graduated from Boulder City High School. She and her sisters were nicknamed the "Boulder City Babes" during the 1930s owing to their looks.

Kesterson received her bachelor's degree in journalism from Utah State University. She worked as a missionary for the Church of Jesus Christ of Latter-day Saints (LDS Church) after completing college, primarily in Philadelphia and New York City. She returned to Clark County, Nevada, where she began her career and started a family with her husband, Robert "Bob" Kesterson. She had four children.

U.S. President Harry S. Truman awarded her the Red Cross Certification of Merit in 1947 for rescuing a boy scout from California who was drowning in Lake Mead.

=== Journalism ===
Kesterson reported for both the Las Vegas Review-Journal and the Las Vegas Sun during the 1950s. She covered local Henderson and Boulder City news for the newspapers.

Kesterson was next hired as a reporter for the now defunct Henderson Home News, a local community paper, for nearly thirty years before launching a career in politics. She later became the managing editor of the Henderson Home News as well. Kesterson sold the newspaper's articles to larger publications, including the Deseret News and the Las Vegas Sun.

She continued to work as a reporter while serving on the Henderson City Council from 1977 to 1985. She retired as managing editor of the Henderson Home News upon her election as Mayor of Henderson in 1985.

=== Political career ===
Kesterson did not enter politics until she was 49 years old. She was appointed to the Henderson City Council in 1975. Kesterson was named as Henderson's woman of the year in 1975, the same year as her appointment. Two years later, in 1977, Keterson won re-election to the Henderson city council, and served on the council until 1981. She remained a newspaper reporter and editor while serving on the council until her retirement from the newspaper in 1985.

In 1985, Lorna Kesterson was elected Henderson's first female mayor, becoming the first woman to hold that office. She was re-elected to a second, four-year in term in 1989. Henderson experienced unprecedented population growth during Kesterson's eight-year tenure as mayor, ultimately becoming Nevada's second largest city after Las Vegas. Kesterson and the city council planned the city's new infrastructure, neighborhoods, city parks and recreational facilities to accommodate the needs of the new residents. She left office in 1993.

In recognition, Henderson named her the "Henderson Woman of Distinction" in 1985. In 1991, the state of Nevada named her "Nevada Public Official of the Year." Lorna J Kesterson Elementary School, dedicated in her honor in February 2001, and a Henderson recreational area are named for Kesterson.

She also served on a number of boards of directors within the Las Vegas Valley, including the Henderson Development Association, the Nevada League of Cities and the Las Vegas Convention and Visitors Authority. She held a seat on the Clark County Board of Health throughout the 1980s.

== Death and legacy ==
Lorna Kesterson collapsed and died unexpectedly during a routine visit to her doctor's office on January 16, 2012, at the age of 86. She was survived by her two sons, Don Kesterson of Henderson and Roger Kesterson; seven grandchildren, seven great-grandchildren; and two siblings, Venus Marriages and Donal Jolley. She was predeceased by two sons, Robert Ross Kesterson and Jim Lynn Kesterson, and her husband of nearly 40 years, Robert Earl Kesterson.

Andy Hafen, Mayor of Henderson from 2009 to 2017, also served in the city council during Kesterson's eight-year tenure as mayor and paid tribute to his predecessor saying, "Lorna Kesterson was one of the finest ladies I've had the privilege of working with during my career in public service," said Hafen in a statement. "She was a Henderson icon and a pioneer both in politics and in our community."

In 2012, the Lorna J. Kesterson Elementary School was named in her honor.

== See also ==
- List of mayors of Henderson, Nevada
