= The District at Green Valley Ranch =

Mixed-use in Henderson, Nevada, U.S.

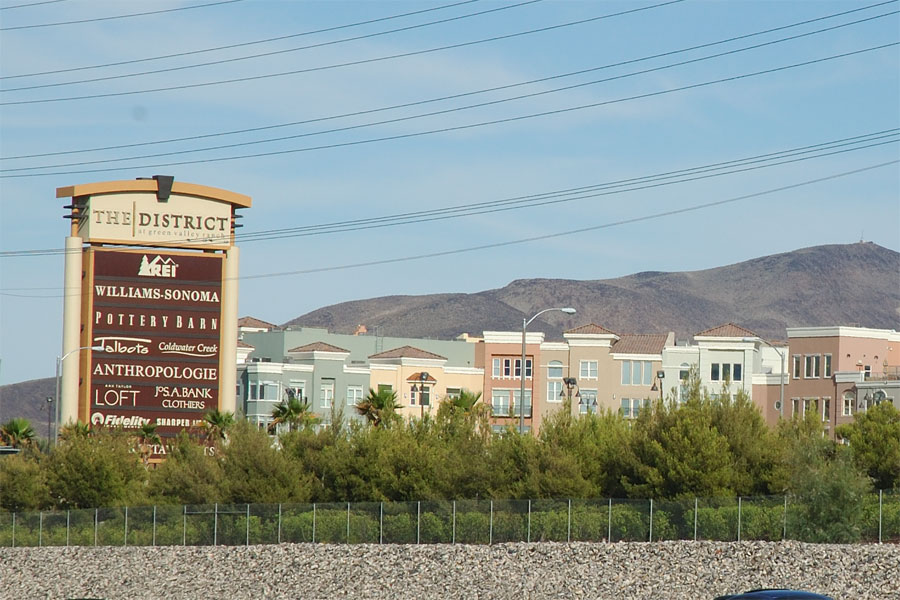

Project
- Opening date: April 15, 2004 (first phase); August 2005 (second phase)
- Developer: American Nevada Corporation
- Architect: Perlman Architects (first phase); JMA Architecture Studios (second phase)
- Owner: Vestar Development; American Nevada Corporation (undeveloped acreage)
- Website: shopthedistrictgvr.com

Physical features
- Streets: Green Valley Parkway

Location
- Location in Nevada
- Coordinates: 36.021418°N 115.086749°W
- Location: Henderson, Nevada; I-215 & Green Valley Parkway

The District at Green Valley Ranch is a mixed-use development in Green Valley Ranch, a neighborhood in the city of Henderson, Nevada. It is located east of the Green Valley Ranch hotel-casino, and includes retail, restaurant, office, and residential space. The District, like the resort, was developed by American Nevada Corporation. Planning for a mixed-use project dates to 1996, as part of the resort plans.

The District's first phase was opened on April 15, 2004, becoming the first mixed-use project in the Las Vegas Valley. A second phase opened in 2005, on a separate parcel located just east of the original phase. The District was hurt financially due to the Great Recession, and American Nevada eventually sold it to lenders in 2011. Vestar Development took over ownership later that year with Rockwood Capital as a partner, before buying out the latter's interest in 2015.

== History ==
The project was built in the Green Valley Ranch neighborhood located within the city of Henderson, Nevada, which is part of the Las Vegas Valley. The District is split across two parcels, which are divided by South Green Valley Parkway and were developed as separate phases. It is located east of the Green Valley Ranch resort. The District and the resort were both developed by American Nevada Corporation.

Plans for the resort were underway in 1996, along with a proposed mixed-use center on adjacent property that would include restaurant, retail, medical, and office space. The Green Valley Ranch hotel-casino opened in December 2001, and American Nevada announced that it would proceed with plans for an urban village, to be built on 30 vacant acres located east of the resort. A pedestrian walkway would link directly to the hotel-casino. The project was described by American Nevada president John Kilduff as a "pedestrian-friendly Main Street concept". It was meant to resemble the downtown areas of small towns in the Northeastern and Midwest United States. Kilduff said, "It will look like this center was built over 60 or 70 years. It will look like you're going through different neighborhoods. One building might be brick, the next stucco".

The project, known as The Shops at Green Valley Ranch, received final city approval in December 2002. The city's zoning codes had to be altered to allow for the project to proceed. It was designed by Perlman Architects, with McCarthy Building Companies as the general contractor. Construction on the $80 million project was underway in early 2003. The project's location was considered desirable, being situated beside the Las Vegas Beltway. In March 2004, a name change was announced: The District at Green Valley Ranch. The new name was chosen to reflect the project's wide array of features other than shopping.

=== Opening ===
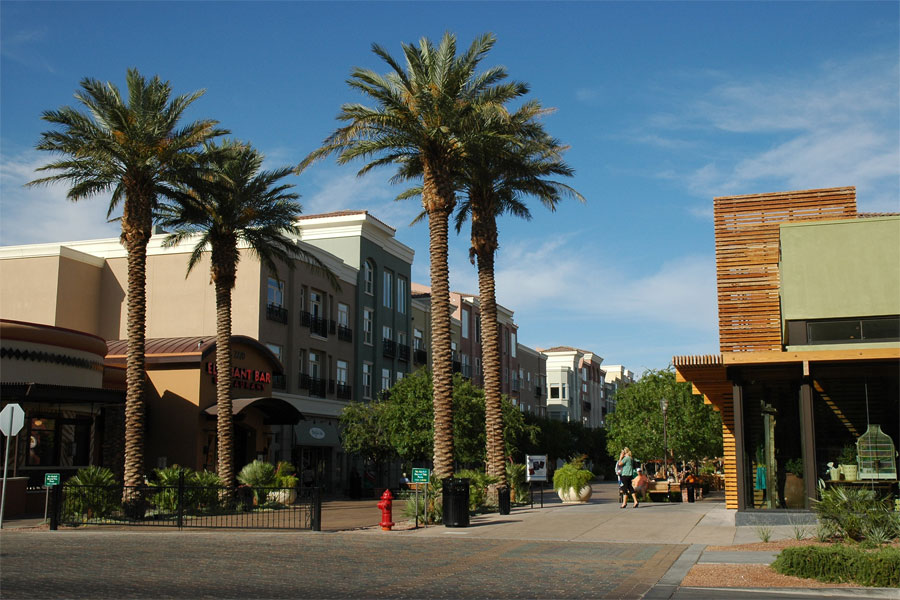
"Main Street" area in 2007

The District opened on April 15, 2004, as the Las Vegas Valley's first mixed-use project, predating Town Square (2007) and Downtown Summerlin (2014). It contained seven buildings for a total of 406,260 sq ft (37,743 m^{2}). Among them was a three-story office building with 65,000 sq ft (6,000 m^{2}), located on the property's southeast corner. Residential units were located in other buildings, above the ground-floor retail tenants. The District had 42 retail spaces totaling 195,000 sq ft (18,100 m^{2}). The open-air mall opened with 29 retailers, while additional stores opened later in the year. Retailers included Anthropologie, Coldwater Creek, and REI's first Las Vegas location. Restaurants included Lucille's Smokehouse Bar-B-Que and P. F. Chang's, The District includes a total of 88 condominium units, previously planned as apartments. A 150-space parking facility was built underground for residents.

In April 2005, American Nevada began construction on its second phase for The District, located east of the first phase. It was built on half of a 40-acre parcel, and included retail and office space. The second phase was designed by JMA Architecture Studios, with Korte Company as the general contractor. Some tenants in the second phase, such as The Cheesecake Factory, began opening in August 2005. Others, such as Whole Foods, would open the following year.

=== New owners and changes ===
The District was negatively affected by the Great Recession, and a loan on the project was put into default in 2009, in an attempt to restructure its debt. After 16 months of unsuccessful negotiations, the District was sold to its lenders in January 2011. It was purchased through foreclosure for $50 million, although American Nevada continued to manage it. The District was sold again at the end of 2011, for $79 million. The new owners were Vestar Development and Rockwood Capital. A carousel was not part of the purchase and was removed from the District. American Nevada ended its managerial role following the sale, and business subsequently increased, with more than 20 new tenants being added over the next four years.

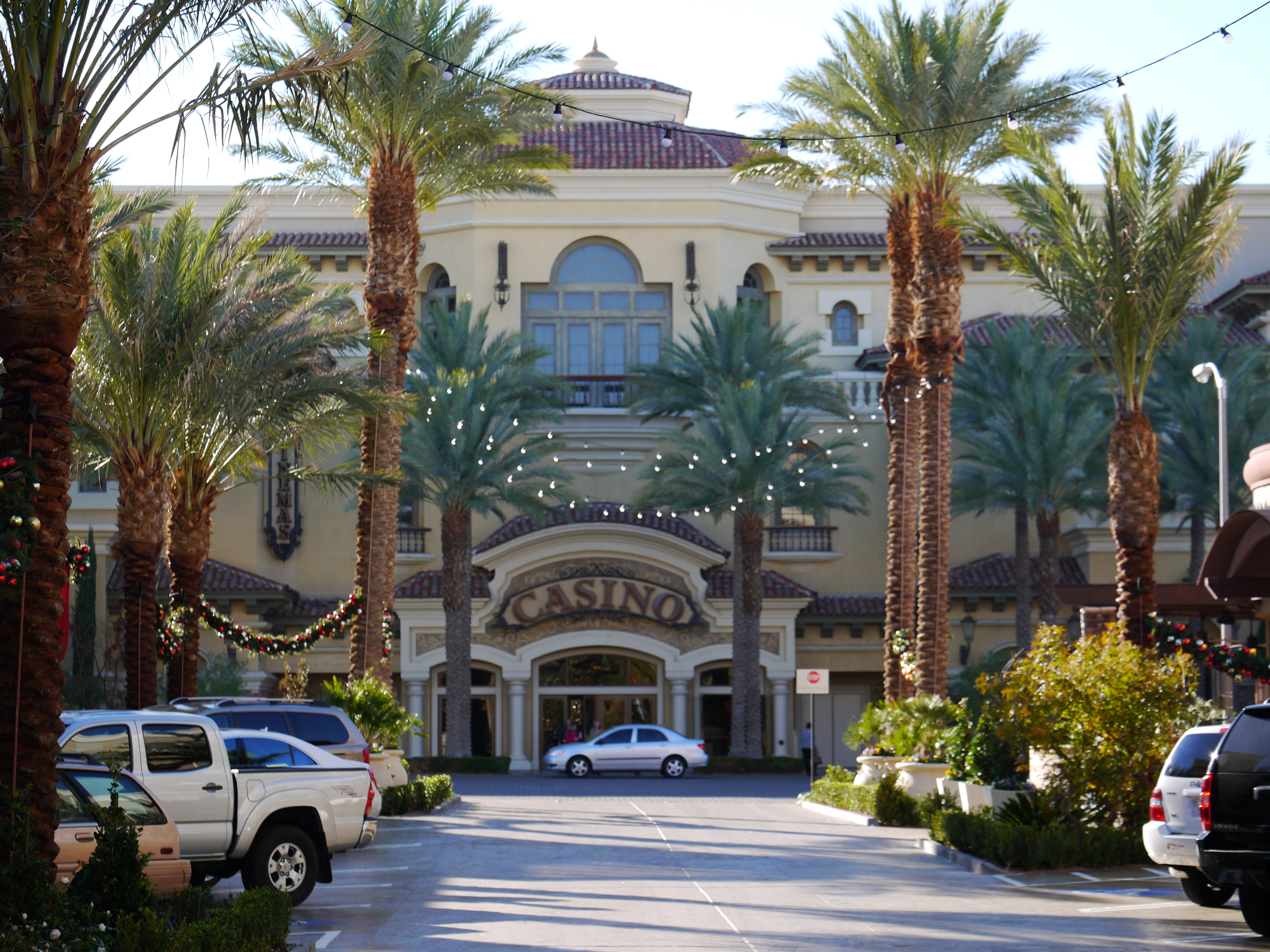
New roadway leading to casino, November 2013

When the first phase opened in 2004, it included a street that ran between the buildings, before being turned into a pedestrian walkway the following year. In November 2012, Vestar proposed turning the pedestrian walkway back into a street. It would include 45 angled parking spaces and would lead straight to the Green Valley Ranch resort. Some businesses located along the walkway had struggled to attract customers, whereas a road would provide quick and easy access. Construction on the project began in mid-2013. Some residents opposed the change, viewing the pedestrian walkway as a signature feature. The new roadway was finished in October 2013, and opposition to the change had decreased by then. Aside from the street, other new features included new lighting, landscaping, and a splash pad. Vestar took over full ownership in July 2015, buying out Rockwood's stake for $120 million.

In 2006, American Nevada had plans to build townhouses on the remaining acreage of the District's eastern parcel. However, the project received opposition from residents of Green Valley Ranch. In 2011, The Calida Group proposed building a 438-unit apartment complex on the land. Previous plans for condominiums were scrapped following the Great Recession. Residents were opposed to the apartment project, believing it lacked an adequate number of parking spaces and would contribute to traffic problems, so the project was later downsized to 360 units. Construction was underway in 2014, and the project opened the following year as Elysian at the District.

American Nevada retains ownership of a vacant two-acre lot on the north side of the first-phase parcel. In 2020, the company announced plans to eventually build more restaurant, retail and office space on the site.
