= American Casino =

- Genre: Reality
- Country of origin: United States
- Original language: English
- No. of seasons: 2
- No. of episodes: 31

Production
- Executive producer: Craig Piligian

Original release
- Network: Discovery Channel
- Release: June 4, 2004 – December 28, 2005

American Casino is an American reality television series which tracks the daily events of the managers and employees of the Green Valley Ranch Casino resort in Henderson, Nevada, a suburb of Las Vegas. The show began airing on the Discovery Channel on June 4, 2004, but was moved to the Travel Channel in June 2005. In other countries including Europe, the show continued to air on Discovery.

The show was executive produced by Craig Piligian of Pilgrim Films & Television. Piligian had also created American Chopper and American Hot Rod.

== Subjects ==
Subjects of the show have included:

- Pat Kearns - SVP of Operations
- Dan Wilson - VP of Marketing
- Joe Hasson - General Manager
- Ralph Marano - Assistant General Manager
- Wayne Shadd - Director of Marketing
- David Demontmollin - Marketing Manager
- Michael Tata - Vice-President of Hotel Operations (2004)
- Brett Magnan - Vice-President of Hotel Operations
- Ninya Perna - Hotel Manager
- Joe Mulligan - Executive Chef
- Willie Bierlien - Banquet Chef
- James Fricker - Pastry Chef
- Alex Peluffo - banquet and Convention Operations
- Dawn Laguardia - Director of Food and Beverage
- Bill Burt - Director of Casino Operations
- Matt Sacca - Director of Player Operations
- Cheryl Rose - Director of Slot Operations
- Fred Tuerck - Assistant Security Manager
- Kelly Downey - Manager, Race and Sports Books
- Lorenzo Fertitta, President, Station Casinos
- Frank Fertitta, Chairman & CEO

Relatively free of interpersonal drama, episodes have included a behind-the-scenes look during rock concerts, slot promotions, blackjack tournaments, weddings, and other events.

== Production ==
Filming began in January 2004, at the Green Valley Ranch hotel and casino in Henderson, Nevada. Approximately 600 hours of footage was shot for the first hour-long episode.

Michael Tata, vice president of hotel operations, died of an accidental fentanyl overdose on July 6, 2004. Prior to Tata's death, more than a dozen additional episodes had been planned for the series' first season, which initially consisted of 13 episodes. The ending of the series' seventh episode, airing on July 16, 2004, acknowledged Tata's death: "In memory of Michael Tata." In August 2004, the show was renewed for an additional 18 episodes. Later that month, an episode involving Tata's death was delayed without explanation until later in the year.

== See also ==
- List of television shows set in Las Vegas
