= Hank Greenspun =

American journalist (1909–1989)

- Born: Herman Milton Greenspun; August 27, 1909; Brooklyn, New York, U.S.
- Died: July 23, 1989 (age 79); Las Vegas, Nevada, U.S.
- Occupations: Newspaper publisher Real estate developer Journalist
- Known for: Publisher of the Las Vegas Sun
- Spouse: Barbara Joan Ritchie
- Children: 4

Herman Milton "Hank" Greenspun (August 27, 1909 – July 23, 1989) was the publisher of the Las Vegas Sun newspaper. He purchased the Sun in 1949, and served as its editor and publisher until his death. Greenspun was also a prominent real estate developer in the Las Vegas Valley.

== Early years ==
Greenspun was born into a Jewish family in Brooklyn, the son of immigrants from Russian Congress Poland. During World War II, while stationed in Northern Ireland, Greenspun met his wife, Barbara, at a dinner party hosted by Maureen Black (née Peres) daughter of Harold Peres of Solomon and Peres and wife of British businessman Roy Keith Black. As a young man, Greenspun became closely involved with Benjamin "Bugsy" Siegel and the work he was doing to reopen his Flamingo casino. Greenspun worked as the Flamingos's publicity agent. Following the murder of Siegel in Los Angeles in 1947, Greenspun renewed his interest in his Jewish heritage and became a prominent figure in supporting the struggle to establish the State of Israel.

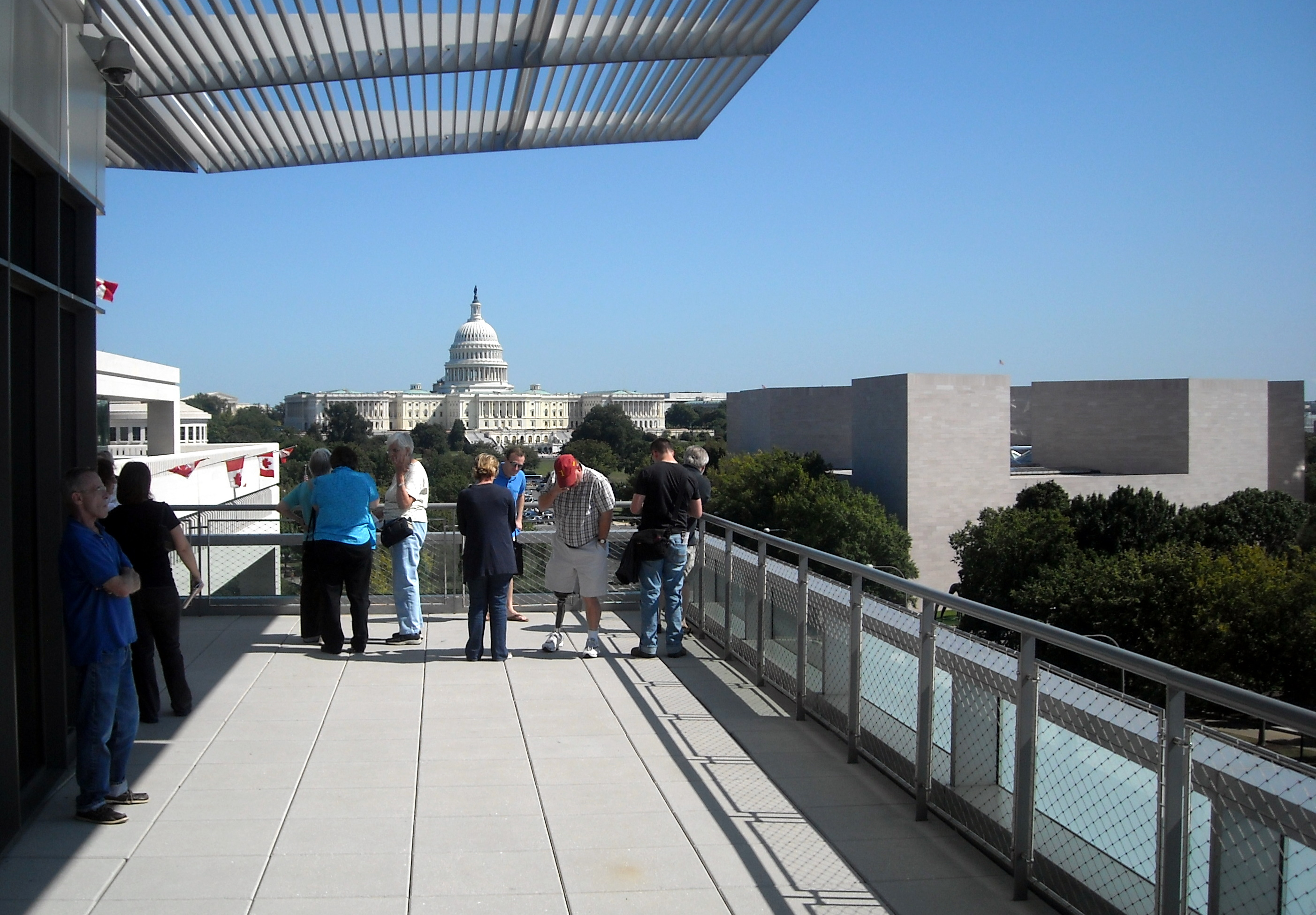
People standing on the Newseum's Hank Greenspun Terrace, which overlooks Pennsylvania Avenue and the National Mall in Washington, D.C. The United States Capitol, the East Building of the National Gallery of Art, and the Embassy of Canada are visible in the background.

== Supplies arms to Israel ==
In 1947, when the Haganah was already in armed conflict with Arab forces, Greenspun shipped machine guns and airplane parts to that organization (which later became the core of the Israel Defense Forces). This was a violation of the U.S. Neutrality Acts, a crime for which Greenspun was arrested and ultimately convicted on July 10, 1950. He was fined $10,000 but received no prison time. On October 18, 1961, President John F. Kennedy granted Greenspun a pardon. Upon Greenspun's death in 1989, former Israeli Prime Minister Shimon Peres called Greenspun "a hero of our country and a fighter for freedom".

== Feuds with Joe McCarthy ==
Greenspun began a feud with Republican Senator Joseph McCarthy in 1952, publishing several articles attacking him as a demagogue. He also wrote articles accusing McCarthy of being a homosexual. Greenspun became further entrenched in domestic politics when allegations were made that he held blackmail information against prominent Democratic presidential nominees.

== Target of Watergate plumbers ==
On June 17, 1972, Virgilio González, Bernard Barker, James W. McCord, Jr., Eugenio Martínez and Frank Sturgis were arrested while placing electronic devices in the Democratic Party campaign offices in an apartment block called Watergate, in Washington, D.C. It later emerged that people working for President Richard Nixon wanted to wiretap the conversations of Larry O'Brien, chairman of the Democratic National Committee. The Watergate scandal developed from this incident, leading to wide-ranging investigations, Congressional hearings, and steady media coverage for the next two years.

On May 23, 1973, McCord admitted that this group (known as the "Plumbers") had been involved in several covert activities. This included a plot to steal documents from Hank Greenspun's safe. McCord testified that Attorney General John N. Mitchell had told him that Greenspun had in his possession blackmail type information involving a Democratic candidate for president. E. Howard Hunt and G. Gordon Liddy believed Greenspun possessed incriminating information on Edmund Muskie, and wanted to capture the documents in a joint operation with billionaire Howard Hughes’ security team. The operation fell through because Hughes's team refused to go further.

== Business dealings and career ==
Immediately after Greenspun's death, his family entered the Sun into a joint operating agreement with the Las Vegas Review-Journal. As a result, the Sun operated as an afternoon daily from 1990 on. Beginning in October 2005, under an amended joint operating agreement, the paper began delivery with the morning Review-Journal as an insert.

Greenspun formed The Greenspun Corporation to manage the family's assets.

Greenspun was also heavily involved in real estate, acquiring most of the western portion of Henderson, Nevada for a development that eventually became Green Valley. Much of the original seed money for the real estate investment was acquired through a loan from the International Brotherhood of Teamsters. His family controls the majority of this land and associated real estate developments, including golf courses and the Green Valley Ranch, Resort and Spa with interest being held through The Greenspun Corporation.

Greenpsun started the first TV station in Nevada, KLAS-TV, in 1953.

Greenspun ran for Governor of Nevada in 1962, but was defeated in the Republican Party primary by Oran Gragson.

In 2008, SGP Media produced a feature documentary about the life and times of Hank Greenspun, narrated by Anthony Hopkins.

== Personal life ==
In 1944, he married Northern Ireland native Barbara Joan Ritchie, who also was Jewish. They had four children: Brian Greenspun, president and editor of the Sun and chairman of The Greenspun Corporation; Daniel Greenspun, president of the Greenspun Media Group and vice president of the Sun; Susan Greenspun Fine, member of the Anti-Defamation League Board; and Jane Greenspun Gale, animal-rights activist. Barbara died in 2010 at the age of 88. Barbara & Hank Greenspun Junior High School, a middle school in Henderson, Nevada opened in 1991 in honor of the two.

Greenspun was a friend of Las Vegas promoter Ed Becker and the investigative journalist Ed Reid, he introduced them to one another and they would go on to work together for Reid's book The Grim Reapers: The Anatomy of Organized Crime in America (1970).

== See also ==
- List of people pardoned or granted clemency by the president of the United States
