= Austin Way =

- Cover of the April 2024 issue, featuring Willie Nelson, photographed by Kate Liddy
- Editor-in-chief: Riki Altman-Yee
- Categories: Regional lifestyle magazine
- Frequency: 7x per year
- Circulation: 50,000
- Publisher: John Lunn
- First issue: September 2014; 11 years ago
- Company: Modern Luxury
- Country: United States
- Based in: Austin, Texas
- Language: English
- Website: modernluxury.com/austin
- OCLC: 940843207

Austin Way is a luxury lifestyle magazine published by Modern Luxury and based in Austin, Texas, covering fashion, style, music, philanthropy, real estate, dining, and art for the city's affluent community. It is published seven times a year with a circulation of 50,000.

== History ==
Austin Way was launched in September 2014 by GreenGale Publishing, the renamed successor to Niche Media, which had been founded by Jason Binn in 1998. The launch was timed to capitalize on Austin's emergence as a major technology hub and luxury destination, a period of rapid population and economic growth that made the city an attractive market for a high-end regional title. GreenGale was acquired by Modern Luxury, a national city and regional magazine publisher, in 2017.

The following year, Austin Way was abruptly shut down in 2018 amid the financial strain that followed Modern Luxury's post-acquisition integration of GreenGale, the same period during which Modern Luxury significantly reduced editorial budgets across its portfolio. The magazine remained dormant for five years, a hiatus longer than that experienced by any other current Modern Luxury title. Modern Luxury relaunched Austin Way in September 2023, with Katerina "Kat" Cotroneo named as editor-in-chief. At the time of the relaunch, Cotroneo described Austin as "a modern boomtown growing more each day, especially in the luxury space." Riki Altman-Yee subsequently became editor-in-chief in 2025 and currently holds the role.
