= Philadelphia Style =

Coordinates: 39.93427°N 75.14684°W

- Cover of the June 2023 issue featuring Joel Embiid, photographed by Jesse D. Garrabant
- Editor in Chief: Marni Manko
- Categories: Lifestyle magazine
- Frequency: Monthly (10x per year)
- Publisher: John M. Colabelli
- Total circulation: 50,000 (2017)
- Founded: 1997
- Company: Modern Luxury
- Country: United States
- Based in: Philadelphia, Pennsylvania, U.S.
- Language: English
- Website: modernluxury.com/philadelphia/

Philadelphia Style is a luxury lifestyle magazine published by Modern Luxury and based in Philadelphia, Pennsylvania, covering fashion, beauty, travel, philanthropy, entertainment, interior design, architecture, real estate, and coverage of Philadelphia personalities for readers in the greater Philadelphia metropolitan region. It is published ten times a year.

== History and profile ==
Philadelphia Style was started in 1997 by John M. Colabelli, Publisher and CEO. Colabelli, who had previously worked as a financial consultant and broker at Merrill Lynch and as principal and publisher at Tear Sheet Publications, founded the magazine to serve Philadelphia's affluent community. Dana Spain-Smith became the magazine's CEO in 2001 and bought out Colabelli in 2004, operating the publication under DLG Media Holdings, which also published the online titles DC Style and ACConfidential.com. On February 4, 2008, Jason Binn's Niche Media acquired DLG Media Holdings, purchasing Philadelphia Style along with its sister online publications. Spain-Smith cited her desire to devote her time to the Philadelphia Animal Welfare Society as her reason for selling. Colabelli remained as publisher following the acquisition.

Niche Media was subsequently sold to Greenspun Media Group and later renamed GreenGale Publishing. In May 2017, GreenGale was acquired by Modern Luxury. Following the acquisition, the magazine started publishing ten issues per year compared to six beginning with the January 2018 issue and expanded into ancillary titles including Weddings Philadelphia, Medicine + Doctors Philadelphia, the annual Charity + Social Datebook. Colabelli was named to oversee Modern Luxury's entire Philadelphia regional portfolio and subsequently became President of Modern Luxury's Mid-Atlantic portfolio.

Kristin Detterline, who had served as editor-in-chief since 2009, was appointed Philadelphia group editor under the new ownership and remained in the role until 2021. Marni Manko, the magazine’s founding editor-in-chief, returned to the position in 2023 following Antonia DePace’s two-year tenure.

Its coverage extends beyond Philadelphia to the broader region, including Atlantic City a tradition dating to the magazine's origins under DLG Media Holdings, which published ACConfidential.com as a sister publication. Its annual Best of Style feature highlights editorial picks across food and drink, home design, style, beauty and wellness, and medical; the feature is accompanied by a live event.
