= Green Valley, Henderson =

Coordinates: 36.04°N 115.08°W

Green Valley
- Master-planned community
- Neighborhood of Henderson, Nevada
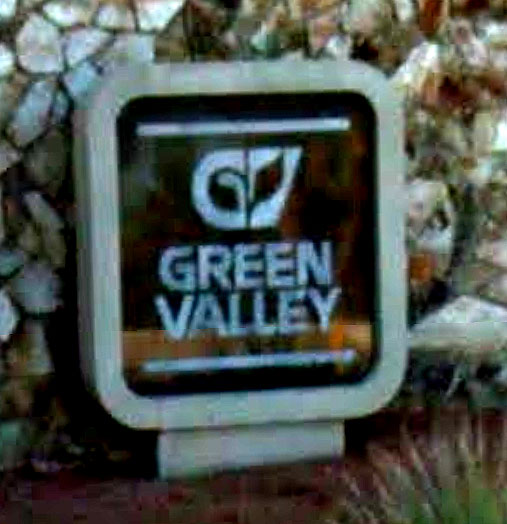
- Original Green Valley Entrance Marker
- Interactive map of Green Valley
- Country: United States
- State: Nevada
- County: Clark
- City: Henderson
- ZIP codes: 89074, 89014, 89012, 89052
- Areas: Green Valley North; Green Valley South; Green Valley Ranch

Green Valley is a master planned community located in Henderson, Nevada, and Southern Nevada's first master-planned community built before Summerlin. The Green Valley Master Community development was founded in 1978 by American Nevada Corporation in an area of 8,400 acres (34 km^{2}) in the southeast part of the Las Vegas Valley. Smaller neighborhoods called Green Valley Ranch and Green Valley South are within the boundaries of the master community. Green Valley South began construction around 1985, while Green Valley Ranch began construction in 1994. Shopping, bars, and restaurants are located at The District at Green Valley Ranch. Green Valley (North, South, and Ranch) postal codes include: all of 89074, 89014, and 89012. Green Valley Ranch extends into the eastern areas of the zip code of 89052.

== History ==
Green Valley was developed by American Nevada Corporation, which had begun planning the community as of 1973. Green Valley's grand opening was held on October 24, 1978. Attendees included Nevada governor Mike O'Callaghan.

== Master planned areas ==
Master planned areas of Green Valley include:

- Green Valley Estates
- The Village of Fox Ridge
- Whitney Ranch
- Hillsboro Heights
- MacDonald Ranch
- Sun City MacDonald Ranch
- MacDonald Highlands
- Ascaya
- Roma Hills
- Resort Villas
- The Fountains
- Quail Ridge
- The Village of Silver Springs
- The Legacy Village
- The Grand Legacy
- The Masters Series
- Green Valley Ranch
- Southfork
- Sunridge Heights
- Ventana Canyon
- The Bluffs
- Millwood Village
- Westwood Village
- Sentosa
- Crown Pointe

== Education ==
Public education is provided by the Clark County School District. The community is home to 11 public elementary schools, 3 middle schools, and 3 high schools. Silverado High School also covers the borderline of the community, as it resides in both Green Valley and Paradise.

=== Elementary schools ===
- David M. Cox Elementary School
- Aggie Roberts Elementary School
- Selma F. Bartlett Elementary School
- James Gibson Elementary School
- Nate Mack Elementary School
- Estes M. McDoniel Elementary School
- Glen C. Taylor Elementary School
- Jim Thorpe Elementary School
- Harriet A. Treem Elementary School
- Neil C. Twitchell Elementary School
- John C. Vanderburg Elementary School

=== Middle schools ===
- Francis H. Cortney Junior High School
- Barbara & Hank Greenspun Junior High School
- Bob Miller Middle School
- Thurman White Middle School

=== High schools ===
- Coronado High School
- Green Valley High School
- Southeast Career & Technical Academy

== Shopping ==
- The District at Green Valley Ranch, a mixed-use development center.
- Galleria at Sunset, a shopping mall.
- Galleria Shopping District
