= The Greenspun Corporation =

- Company type: Private
- Founder: Hank Greenspun
- Headquarters: Henderson, Nevada, U.S.

The Greenspun Corporation (TGC) is a privately owned corporation that manages the Greenspun family assets. The company was founded by Hank Greenspun and is based in Henderson, Nevada.

== Subsidiaries ==
- American Nevada Corporation- Land development
- Greenspun Media Group- Print publications
- Las Vegas Sun- Daily print newspaper
- VEGAS.com- Travel and tourism related services
  - Casino Travel and Tours- Tourism related services, subsidiary of VEGAS.com
  - CTT Transportation- Limousine and motor coach services, subsidiary of VEGAS.com
- Sun Media Productions- Film and video production
- Niche Media acquired by GMG in 2007 from Jason Binn

== Joint ventures ==
- KTUD-CD (VegasTV) Greenspun had 60% interest with Catalyst Investors and later defunct
- Las Vegas One: A defunct local cable news channel with Cox Cable and KLAS-TV
- Sky Mall joint project with Spire Capital and former joint venture owner
