= San Francisco (magazine) =

U.S. magazine

- Cover of the October 2020 issue, featuring Kamala Harris, photographed by Shayan Asgharnia
- Editor: Michael McCarthy
- Categories: Lifestyle
- Frequency: Ten times per year
- Publisher: Autumn O'Keefe
- Total circulation: 75,000
- Founded: 1955; 71 years ago
- Company: Modern Luxury
- Country: United States
- Based in: San Francisco
- Language: English
- Website: modernluxury.com/san-francisco/
- ISSN: 1097-6345

San Francisco is an American city and regional magazine covering culture, dining, style, real estate, and lifestyle topics in the San Francisco Bay Area. It is published by Modern Luxury. The magazine originated from publications developed by public broadcaster KQED and became known for long-form and investigative journalism during the 2000s and 2010s. It has received two National Magazine Awards for General Excellence, in 2010 and 2018.

== History ==
=== Early magazine (1962–1990) ===
There have been two separate magazines named San Francisco. The first grew out of an earlier publication from the late 1950s titled San Francisco Town and Country and began publishing in 1962. It was a widely circulated news and lifestyle magazine by the 1970s but faced strong competition from San Francisco Focus and was financially struggling by the 1980s, declaring Chapter 11 bankruptcy in 1985. The magazine ceased publishing between December 1985 and December 1986, was picked up by Maryland-based publisher Ted Venetoulis and revived briefly, but failed to regain circulation. It was resold in the late 1980s to Texas-based publisher Jeffrey Gluck, financially collapsed in 1989, and was last published in January 1990.

=== KQED and San Francisco Focus ===
The second and current magazine has its roots starting in 1955, when San Francisco public broadcasting station KQED-TV began publishing a programming guide called KQED in Focus. The guide gradually expanded its editorial content and took on the character of a full magazine, eventually renamed to Focus Magazine and then San Francisco Focus. In 1984, a new programming guide, Fine Tuning was separated off from Focus, which carried on as a self-contained magazine. San Francisco Focus was the recipient of a National Headliner Award for feature writing in 1993. In 1996, KQED sold San Francisco Focus to Diablo Publications to pay off debts. The magazine was spun off into an independent entity in January 1997 and rebranded as simply San Francisco in October of that year. During the dot-com boom, the magazine produced a satirical "Greed Issue" lampooning internet-fueled excess in the Bay Area, reflecting its willingness to critically engage with the region's dominant industries.

=== Independent era and editorial growth ===
New management took over in 1999, and Bruce Kelley arrived as the editor-in-chief in June 2000. Under Kelley's leadership, San Francisco won a National Magazine Award for General Excellence in 2010 and three Maggies as Best City and Regional Magazine from the Western Publications Association (2006, 2007, and 2009). Prior to the sale to Modern Luxury, the magazine had operated as an independent LLC under owner Barry Traub, with San Francisco financier Warren Hellman also holding a stake. On November 20, 2005, the magazine was sold to Modern Luxury Media by its owners, including publisher Steven Dinkelspiel, Diablo Publications founder Steve Rivera, businessman Philip Shenon, and the estate of private investigator Hal Lipset. Dinkelspiel, who had previously served as the magazine's circulation director and general counsel, became publisher in March 1999 and president following Modern Luxury's acquisition.

=== Editorial restructuring and transition ===
Jon Steinberg served as editor-in-chief from 2012 to 2018, overseeing the magazine during a period of significant editorial ambition. Unlike most Modern Luxury titles, San Francisco maintained a reputation for narrative-driven and investigative journalism, producing long-form features on Bay Area politics, homelessness, crime, and social issues that earned national recognition, including a second National Magazine Award for General Excellence in 2018.

In 2018, following Modern Luxury's acquisition of GreenGale Publishing the previous year, the magazine faced significant financial strain as the parent company struggled to integrate the two companies' staffs and accounting systems. Modern Luxury reduced the per-issue freelance budget from $30,000 to $20,000 and consolidated design operations to Chicago.

Steinberg resigned in summer 2018, and shortly after, all but two members of the editorial staff quit or gave notice. Modern Luxury named Jason Sheeler, formerly style director at Departures, as his successor. The November 2018 issue—the last produced under the outgoing team—contained, for the first time in the magazine's history, a corporate-mandated story: a two-page travel spread on the Dominican Republic coinciding with a tourism ministry advertisement, a practice the departing editorial staff described as a breach of the magazine's longstanding separation of editorial and advertising. Sheeler's tenure was brief; he was succeeded by Bay Area journalist Pati Navalta Poblete, who was laid off in 2020 amid pandemic-related cuts. Michael McCarthy has served as editor-in-chief since 2020, concurrently overseeing Modern Luxury's Silicon Valley, Washington, D.C., and Aspen publications.

Following the 2018 restructuring, the magazine shifted away from investigative journalism toward a lifestyle and luxury editorial focus more consistent with other Modern Luxury titles, covering dining, fashion, real estate, philanthropy, and Bay Area personalities. Its annual Best of the Bay feature highlights editorial picks across food and drink, home and real estate, style, beauty and wellness, arts and entertainment, and local travel; the feature is accompanied by a live event, with the 2025 edition marking its 24th year, coinciding with the magazine's 70th anniversary.

== Editorial style and coverage ==
During the 2000s and 2010s, San Francisco became known for long-form narrative and investigative journalism covering Bay Area politics, technology, crime, homelessness, food, and culture. Following editorial restructuring under Modern Luxury in 2018, the magazine shifted toward lifestyle and luxury-focused coverage.

== Awards and recognition ==
San Francisco has received multiple National Magazine Awards, City and Regional Magazine Awards, and James Beard Foundation Awards for journalism and feature writing.

American Society of Magazine Editors (ASME)

- Winner, General Excellence, 2018
- Finalist, Personal Service: "The New School of Fish", by Erik Vance, 2012
- Finalist, General Excellence (Special Interest Magazines), 2011
- Winner, General Excellence, 2010
- Finalist, Public Interest: "War of Values", by Danelle Morton, 2010
- Finalist, Public Interest: "Innocence Lost", by Nina Martin, November 2004
- Finalist, Public Interest: "Trouble in the Presidio", by Kerry Tremain, December 2001

City & Regional Magazine Awards (CRMA)

- Gold Award, Civic Journalism: "Innocence Lost", by Nina Martin, November 2004
- Bronze Award, General Excellence, 2003
- Bronze Award, Reporting: "The Brobeck Mutiny", July 2003
- Bronze Award, Special Issue: "Think Green", June 2003
- Silver Award, Special Issue: "Our Dot-com Decade: What Really Happened", April 2002
- Bronze Award, Reporting: "What Just Happened Here?", April 2002
- Bronze Award, Food and Dining Criticism: Josh Sens's monthly review "Critical Dish" ("The Best Restaurant", July 2002; "Now We're Not Cooking", September 2002; "A Maison of His Own", November 2002)
- Bronze Award for General Criticism: Dana Goia's classical music criticism ("Good Lord!", December 2001; "Glass Appeal", October 2002; "Moulin Rogue", September 2002)
- Bronze medal, 2001 City-Regional Magazine Awards (National Competition) for Reporting, October 2001; Bud Hazelkorn, "The Sausage King;" San Francisco (magazine). Mindfully.org. Archived from the original on May 27, 2016. Retrieved June 28, 2011.

Maggie Awards
Awards by the Western Publications Association in magazine, periodical, and online publishing.

- Best Feature Article/Consumer: "What Happened to Black San Francisco", Sept. 2006, by Jaimal Yogis
- Best Feature Article/Consumer: "What it Really Means to be Green", June 2003
- Best Regularly Featured Department, Section or Column/Consumer: "City Journal"
- Best City & Metropolitan/Consumer: April 2006

James Beard Foundation Awards

- Winner, Best Food and Culture Writing, "The Toxic, Abusive, Addictive, Supportive, Codependent Relationship Between Chefs and Yelpers", Rebecca Flint Marx, August 2014
- Finalist, Best Feature Writing, "King of the Mall", Maile Carpenter, August 2004
- Winner, Best Feature Writing, "Eating in Michael Bauer's Town", Maile Carpenter, August 2001

== See also ==
- KQED
- Media in San Francisco
