= Gotham (magazine) =

American magazine

- Frequency: 8 per year
- Publisher: Lynn Scotti
- Total circulation: 65,000 (December 2011)
- Founded: 2001
- Final issue: 2018
- Company: Niche Media
- Country: USA
- Based in: New York City
- Language: English
- Website: www.gotham-magazine.com

Gotham was a fashion magazine founded by publisher Jason Binn in 2001 and published by Niche Media, LLC. The magazine covered fashion, and beauty. Published eight times a year, it was distributed in Manhattan. The editor-in-chief was Samantha Yanks. The magazine was published by Debra Halpert until August 2011 when David Katz began to publish it.

According to a survey commissioned by the company, 56 percent of Gotham readers were male, with 51 percent married, and some two-thirds within the age group of 30 and 60 years old. Gotham was a sister publication to Hamptons magazine, sharing advertising and production.

Niche Media was renamed GreenGale Publishing in 2018. GreenGale was acquired by Modern Luxury in 2017. In 2018, Gotham was merged into its new sister magazine, Manhattan. The magazine can still be accessed at its website and social media platforms, now a digital platform by Modern Luxury covering New York City's luxury lifestyle.
