= DuJour Media =

Lifestyle publishing brand

DuJour
- Categories: Lifestyle
- Frequency: Quarterly
- Total circulation: 100,000
- Founder: Jason Binn
- First issue: September 2012
- Company: DuJour Media
- Country: United States
- Based in: New York City
- Language: English
- Website: www.dujour.com

DuJour is a print and digital luxury lifestyle publishing brand. Its chief publication is DuJour Magazine, a controlled circulation quarterly print magazine for which subscribers must fulfill highly specific wealth requirements, with one of the criteria being "a net worth of over $5 million". There is also a monthly digital version, and a weekly e-mail newsletter. The print publication is distributed to more than 100,000, and is audited by BPA Worldwide. The average age of its readership is 41.

It is distributed in U.S. markets, such as Southern California, New York, Chicago, Palm Beach, Miami, Atlanta, Dallas, Houston, San Francisco and Las Vegas, with seasonal editions in the Hamptons, Aspen, and Sun Valley. It sets aside half the editorial content for local and regional news and events.

== History ==
The DuJour Media brand was created by Niche Media founder Jason Binn in September 2012. The idea was to offer the "glamour of print" while tapping into the fast-paced consumer effect of the digital world.

Its total reach is near 4 million. For the brands that advertise to DuJour's readership, the value of its annual offerings, combining its digital and social reach with the quarterly rhythm of its print magazine, is estimated to be worth just over $2 million.

== Awards ==
- DuJour.com was awarded a Webby for Best Home/Welcome Page.
- DuJour was selected as the Best Newcomer in the AdWeek Hot List Readers’ Choice Poll of 2013, and as Hottest Lifestyle Magazine in 2014.
- In 2014, DuJour was among the Reader's Choice Award Top 10 Covers by the American Society of Magazine Editors.
