= Boulder City News =

Weekly newspaper serving community in Nevada, US

- Type: Weekly newspaper
- Owner: Greenspun Media Group
- Founded: 1937
- Ceased publication: October 2009
- Language: English
- City: Boulder City, Nevada

The Boulder City News was a weekly newspaper distributed in Boulder City, Nevada. The paper was first published in 1937. When it ceased publication in late October 2009, the paper was published by the Greenspun Media Group. The paper was focused on the community of Boulder City including the local sports, news and events. According to the Circulation Verification Council, for the first half of 2009 the paper's circulation increased by 29.3% which was the largest increase in the country for any community newspaper.

== History ==
The paper was the follow on to the Boulder City Daily News. The paper switched to a weekly format on February 11, 1949. Oral history states that the paper was actually weekly from about 1940 onward. During the war, Robert E. Carter published as often as supplies were available, but he made sure that papers were printed at least once a week. This led to an erratic schedule as both paper and ink supplies, and gas for delivery, were restricted by war-time regulations. The paper issued on August 14, 1945, with the Headline "Japs Accept" stated that the paper was "published every morning except Sunday and Monday. Only newspaper printed and published in Boulder city under government permit."

== Awards ==
The paper was recognized at the third-best newspaper with a circulation under 10,000 in the United States in 2007. Before it shut down in 2009, the paper's circulation was 4,623.

== Other local papers ==
- Boulder City Citizen
- Boulder City Daily News {November 18, 1946 - January 30, 1948}
- Boulder City News (1940) (January 2, 1941 - November 15, 1946)
- Boulder City News (1948)
- Boulder City Reminder
- Boulder City Reporter
