= Ocean Drive (magazine) =

American lifestyle and fashion magazine

- Camille Kostek on the cover of the October 2025 issue
- Editor-in-Chief: Paige Mastrandrea Pulichino
- Categories: Lifestyle, fashion
- Frequency: 10x per year
- Publisher: Christie Rhodes
- Total circulation: 50,000 (2017)
- Founded: 1992; 34 years ago
- First issue: January 1993
- Company: Modern Luxury
- Country: United States
- Based in: South Florida
- Website: modernluxury.com/miami

Ocean Drive is an American luxury lifestyle and fashion magazine first published in January 1993 by Jason Binn and Jerry Powers during the South Beach renaissance, a period marked by the restoration of the Art Deco Historic District, an influx of European fashion houses, and the emergence of Miami as a global center for modeling and nightlife. Focused on the affluent culture of Miami and its surrounding areas, it covers "trends on fashion, beauty, art, travel, real estate, and entertainment", and has been called the "Bible of South Florida" for its decades of celebrity-driven coverage of Miami's social, fashion, and cultural scenes. The magazine is published ten times a year. Since 2021, Paige Mastrandrea Pulichino has served as editor-in-chief.

== History ==
Powers brought extensive Miami media experience to the venture, having previously worked as a DJ, founded the alternative culture magazine the Daily Planet in Miami Beach, and collaborated with artists including Andy Warhol and Peter Max. The inaugural cover featured supermodel Claudia Schiffer in a Versace evening gown, a deliberate departure from the conventional city magazine format of best-of lists and local service journalism; from the outset, the founders decreed the cover would instead embrace a worldly glamour reflecting Miami's growing reputation as a global fashion destination. Subsequent covers featured supermodels including Christy Turlington, Linda Evangelista, Naomi Campbell, and Tyra Banks, establishing Ocean Drive as a nationally recognized showcase for the supermodel era that coincided with South Beach's rise. Rather than relying on conventional newsstand sales, Binn employed aggressive promotional tactics to distribute the magazine directly to its target audience, including hiring models to hand out copies along Ocean Drive, a strategy that prefigured the controlled circulation model the magazine continues to use. The magazine's first editor-in-chief was Lori Capullo, who worked from an office above the News Café on Ocean Drive at Eighth Street. Among Capullo's early pursuits was landing an interview with fashion designer Gianni Versace, who maintained a residence at Casa Casuarina on Ocean Drive and was a defining figure of the South Beach scene the magazine chronicled.

In 1998, Binn departed to found Niche Media, under which Ocean Drive was later formally consolidated when Greenspun Media Group acquired both entities and merged the Ocean Drive Media Group into Niche Media Holdings in 2007. Powers sold his stake in the magazine around this time and subsequently filed a federal lawsuit against Niche Media, alleging that Binn had interfered with his ability to return to publishing by invoking a noncompete agreement. GreenGale Publishing, as the company had been renamed, was acquired by Modern Luxury in 2017. Over time, Ocean Drive expanded beyond print into digital and live events, and now coexists with its former competitor—now sister publication—MIAMI magazine.
