= Greenspun Media Group =

- Industry: Media
- Headquarters: Henderson, Nevada, U.S.
- Website: gmgvegas.com

The Greenspun Media Group is an independent company and was a wholly owned subsidiary of The Greenspun Corporation. Headquartered in Henderson, Nevada, the group has over 60 years experience in the Las Vegas Valley. Beginning with the Las Vegas Sun newspaper in 1950, the company has grown to more than 30 publications and a total distribution exceeding 27 million magazines and newspapers.

In 2007, The Greenspun Group acquired Niche Media, which was founded in 1992 by Jason Binn. Niche Media was sold in 2014.

== Publications ==
- Las Vegas Sun
- VEGAS INC – Vegas' business newspaper
- Las Vegas Weekly – an alternative weekly newspaper
- Las Vegas Magazine – a tourist guide; prior to 2006, known as Showbiz Weekly
- Vegas2Go

== Former publications ==
- The Home News Community Newspapers of Nevada
  - Boulder City News – 89005
  - Green Valley Home News – 89014, 89074
  - Henderson Home News – 89002, 89011 and 89015
  - Silverado Home News – 89123, 89183; canceled in 2009
  - South Valley Home News – 89012, 89052, 89044
  - Summerlin Home News (NE edition) – 89128, 89129, & 89134; canceled in 2009
  - Summerlin Home News (SW edition) – 89117, 89135, 89138, 89144 & 89145; canceled in 2009
- West Valley News – 89117, 89147; canceled in 2008
- Las Vegas Life, a monthly magazine

== See also ==
- List of companies based in Nevada
