= Aspen Magazine =

American lifestyle magazine

- Nacho Figueras and Delfina Blaquier on Aspen magazine's Holiday 2025/Winter 2026 cover. Photographed by Isaias Miciu
- Editor in Chief: Michael McCarthy
- Categories: Lifestyle
- Frequency: Five times a year
- Publisher: Christine Zanjanipour
- Total circulation: 28,297 (2019)
- Founded: 1974
- Company: Modern Luxury
- Country: United States
- Based in: Aspen, Colorado, U.S.
- Language: English
- Website: modernluxury.com/aspen

Aspen Magazine is a luxury lifestyle magazine published by Modern Luxury and based in Aspen, Colorado, United States. It covers the greater Roaring Fork Valley, with editorial spanning adventure, culture, fashion, food and wine, real estate, and well-being. The magazine's coverage extends across the valley's communities, including Snowmass Village, Basalt, Carbondale, and Glenwood Springs.

== History ==
Aspen, The Magazine, a local publication, was founded in 1974 by Ernie Ashley Goodnough. In 1987, Janet O'Grady and Randy Beier bought the company that owned it, and ceased its publication, founding the publishing company Ridge Publications and copyrighted their new title as Aspen Magazine, with both a local and national editorial direction and an advertising and circulation business model. O'Grady and Beier were the creative and public-facing forces behind the brand and active figures in the Aspen community. The magazine was known for its satirical Best of Aspen issues, which lampooned local culture, personalities, and the quirks of life in one of America's wealthiest resort towns. The publication gradually evolved into a luxury lifestyle magazine through the 1990s and 2000s, tracking Aspen's own transformation into one of America's premier destinations for ultra high-net worth residents and visitors. Aspen Magazine covers culture, fashion, cuisine, health, personalities, travel, luxury, sports, and nature. Randy Beier died of cancer in 2001.

In the year leading up to the sale, the magazine faced financial and staffing difficulties; O'Grady canceled the midsummer and fall 2012 editions and vacated the magazine's downtown Aspen office. O'Grady, who co-led the magazine with Beier from 1987 until his death and served as sole editor in chief from 2001, sold the company in October 2012 to Atlanta-based Modern Luxury, one of the largest luxury regional publishers in the United States, with titles in cities including New York, Los Angeles, Miami, and Chicago. She remained as editor-in-chief for one year following the acquisition to assist with the transition before departing to pursue freelance writing in travel, food, and health. Following O'Grady's departure, the magazine has had several editors-in-chief; Michael McCarthy currently holds the role, which he also holds for Modern Luxury's San Francisco, Silicon Valley, and Washington, D.C. titles.

The magazine once published six issues a year, but as of 2026, it is published five times a year—in February, May, August, October, and December—including the Aspen Insider's Guide. It also publishes the Art Gallery Guide.
