= Hamptons (magazine) =

American magazine

Coordinates: 40.887797°N 72.387389°W

- Cover of the Fall Fashion 2025 issue, featuring Martha Stewart by Carin Backoff.
- Editor-in-chief: Phebe Wahl
- Categories: Lifestyle
- Frequency: 11x per year
- Circulation: 50,000 (2022)
- Publisher: Lynn Scotti
- Founder: Randy Schindler
- Founded: 1978
- Company: Modern Luxury
- Country: United States
- Based in: Southampton, NY
- Language: English
- Website: modernluxury.com/hamptons
- OCLC: 795114073

Hamptons is a magazine founded in 1978 by Randy Schindler and his wife Roberta Stryhas, published eleven times throughout the year focused on real estate, interior design, fashion, art, culture, dining, entertainment, fitness, and philanthropy. The magazine has an approximate circulation of 50,000 copies, distributed across the East End of Long Island, from Westhampton to Montauk.

== History ==
Randy Schindler, who studied at Southampton College, recognized the area's appeal to New York's elite and launched the publication to serve its affluent seasonal and year-round community. The magazine launched that summer as a modest 12-page weekly, produced on a low budget using computer typesetting borrowed from Stryhas's uncle's business; Schindler and Stryhas handled all writing, editing, photography, and layout themselves from their Shelter Island home. The inaugural issue featured interviews with artists including Roy Lichtenstein, Willem de Kooning, and Larry Rivers, reflecting Schindler's background as an art student and the area's established creative community. From the outset the magazine competed with established local titles such as Dan's Papers, a longstanding East End weekly. Through the 1980s and 1990s, the magazine developed a picture-driven, glossy identity, featuring work from photographers including Francesco Scavullo, Peter Beard, and Patrick Demarchelier, as well as prominent coverage of the social scene that defined the Hamptons during that era.

In 1998, Jason Binn acquired the magazine as the founding title of Niche Media, his newly established regional luxury publishing company, around which he built a nationwide portfolio of city-specific luxury titles. Schindler retained a stake in the company following the acquisition; in 2003, he filed suit against Niche Media Holdings in a dispute over its management. In 2006, Binn sold Niche Media to Greenspun Media Group for a sum believed to exceed $100 million; the company was subsequently renamed GreenGale Publishing in November 2015.

Jason Oliver Nixon served as editor-in-chief from 2002 to 2005, helping establish the magazine's aspirational luxury tone under Niche Media. Samantha Yanks, who had risen internally from fashion and accessories director, served as editor-in-chief from 2005 to 2018, simultaneously overseeing sister publication Gotham, before departing to found her own creative agency; Gotham was merged into Modern Luxury's Manhattan magazine in 2018.

GreenGale was acquired by Modern Luxury in 2017, making it the largest luxury lifestyle publisher in the United States, with 65 titles across 22 markets. At the time of the acquisition, Modern Luxury also owned Beach magazine, a competing luxury lifestyle title serving the same East End market; the two titles were editorially differentiated, with Beach pivoting toward health and wellness coverage while Hamptons continued as the flagship luxury lifestyle publication for the region. Beach subsequently folded in 2019. In February 2018, Anetta Nowosielska was named editor-in-chief. She stepped down in February 2021 to pursue book projects and other ventures. Phebe Wahl, Modern Luxury's executive vice president of editorial, succeeded her in summer 2021.
