= Las Vegas Sun =

Daily newspaper in Las Vegas, Nevada

- Type: Daily subscription insert
- Format: Broadsheet (insert)
- Owner: Greenspun Media Group
- Publisher: Brian Greenspun
- Editor: Brian Greenspun
- Founded: May 21, 1950; 76 years ago
- Headquarters: 2275 Corporate Circle Drive; Suite 300; Henderson, Nevada 89074; U.S.
- Website: lasvegassun.com

The Las Vegas Sun was one of the Las Vegas Valley's two daily subscription newspapers, and as of April 3, 2026 its content is only available online. It is owned by the Greenspun family and is affiliated with Greenspun Media Group. The paper published afternoons on weekdays from 1990 to 2005 and was included as a section inside the pages of the morning Las Vegas Review-Journal until April 2, 2026, but continues operating exclusively on its own website.

Its publisher and president is Brian Greenspun, former publisher Hank Greenspun's son. Brian was a college roommate of President Bill Clinton. It has been described as "politically liberal".

== History ==
The Las Vegas Sun was first published on May 21, 1950, by Hank Greenspun, who served as its editor until his death. Hank acquired the Las Vegas Free Press and two weeks later renamed it the Las Vegas Sun. He started the Las Vegas Sun after receiving a US$1,000 loan from businessman Nate Mack. From its founding, the paper was published in the mornings. Starting in 1989, after it signed a Joint Operating Agreement with the Las Vegas Review-Journal, the paper switched to publishing in the afternoon.

On April 20, 2009, the Las Vegas Sun was awarded a Pulitzer Prize for Public Service for its coverage of the high death rate of construction workers on the Las Vegas Strip amid lax enforcement of regulations. The Pulitzer Prize committee noted that the Sun's coverage led to changes in government policy and improved safety conditions. Alexandra Berzon was the primary author of the four-part series. Berzon soon left the Sun after her win, as did health reporter and Pulitzer finalist Marshall Allen in 2011.

== Current status ==
The afternoon edition of the paper was published until September 30, 2005, when, on October 2, 2005, the Las Vegas Sun began distribution with the Las Vegas Review-Journal. The change came about after the Sun entered into an amended joint operating agreement with the Las Vegas Review-Journal to deliver the Sun with the Review-Journal, but with the Sun's content inserted in the Review-Journal. The staff for each paper remained independent.

The Sun is produced by its editors, reporters and photographers at The Greenspun Corporation's offices, then printed by the Review-Journal and included inside the pages of the morning R-J. The section typically contains no advertisements. The two newspapers' editorial departments continue to have in-print disputes, often on the op-ed pages by Brian Greenspun and former Review-Journal publisher Sherman Frederick.

Before Christmas in 2009, the Sun fired more than half its staff. Then, in September 2011, the paper laid off a dozen additional employees, with Greenspun pointing to layoffs at the Sun as being a direct result of recent layoffs at the Review-Journal.
