= Jason Binn =

American publisher and entrepreneur (born 1968)

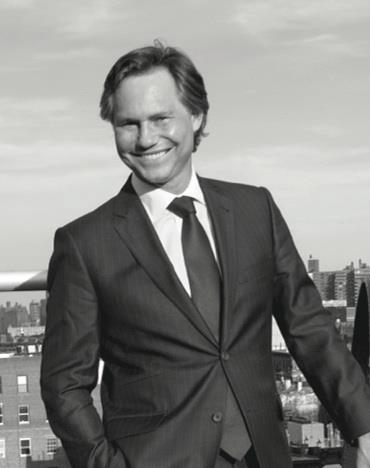
- Binn in 2012
- Born: Jason Frederick Binn; 1968 (age 57–58); Roslyn, New York, U.S.
- Education: Boston University
- Occupation: Publisher
- Known for: DuJour Media, Ocean Drive Magazine, Niche Media

Jason Binn (born 1968) is an American publisher and entrepreneur known for founding Niche Media and DuJour Media.

== Early life and education ==
Binn was born in 1968 to Moreton and Penny Binn in Roslyn, New York. He graduated from Boston University's College of Communications in 1986. He serves on the university's advisory board.

== Publishing career ==
At 23, he began his publishing career at D'Arcy Masius Benton & Bowles. After graduating from Boston University, he built media brands across the country. Upon moving to South Florida, he founded Ocean Drive magazine in 1992, a luxury publication focusing on the Miami lifestyle.

In 1998, he founded Niche Media, a publisher of regional luxury magazines including Hamptons Magazine (The Hamptons, Long Island, New York), Aspen Peak (Aspen, Colorado), Boston Common (Boston, Mass), Capitol File (Washington, D.C.)., Gotham (New York), Los Angeles Confidential, Vegas Magazine (Las Vegas) and Michigan Avenue (Chicago).

In 2010, Binn was appointed Chairman of Niche Media Holdings LLC. In the same 2010, Binn was the Chief Advisor to Gilt Groupe, an online luxury shopping company

In 2012, Binn founded DuJour Media, his first major media launch since he sold Niche Media in 2006. DuJour's publications include Gotham Los Angeles, Aspen Peak and DuJour Magazine, the quarterly released chief publication, that caters to those who have a minimum net worth of $5 million.

== Personal life ==
Binn married Haley Lieberman in December 2003. They have three children and resided together in New York City. before separating in 2016.

== Awards and recognition ==
In fall 2012, Crain's New York credited Binn with making print magazines more successful in a time when print is losing market to digital media. He was also recognized by American Advertising Federation. In 2008 he was a recipient of Boston University's Distinguished Alumni Award for Service to Profession for his work in the field of communications and media.
