= Greenspan =

Greenspan is a typically Ashkenazi Jewish surname. It is the anglicized form of the Yiddish surname Grünspan (Yiddish: גריןשפּאַן, lit. 'green branch/green bridle', actually referring to Copper(II) acetate which was commonly known as "Spanish green"). Cognate are the surnames Grynszpan, Grinszpan and Grinshpan (Poland, Romania, Hungary).

Notable people with the surname include:

- Alan Greenspan (1926–2026), American economist, former Federal Reserve Chairman
- Alison Greenspan (1972–2021), American film and television producer
- Ben Greenspan, American baseball coach
- Bennett Greenspan (born 1952), American entrepreneur, founder of Family Tree DNA
- Brad Greenspan (born 20th century), American entrepreneur (MySpace)
- Brian Greenspan (born 1947), Canadian lawyer
- Bud Greenspan (1926–2010), American film director
- Christopher Dexter Greenspan, creator of OOoOO
- Dave Greenspan (born 1965), American politician
- David Greenspan (born 1956), American actor and playwright
- Deborah Greenspan, British-American scholar
- Dorie Greenspan (born 20th century), American author of cookbooks
- Edward Greenspon (born 1957), Canadian newspaper editor
- Haim Aviv (1940–2021), born Haim Greenspan, Israeli scientist
- Harvey P. Greenspan (1933–2026), American mathematician
- Herschel Grynszpan (1921–before 1945), Jewish assassin
- Jane Cutler Greenspan, American judge
- Jason Scott Greenspan (born 1959), aka Jason Alexander, American actor
- Jerry Greenspan (1941–2019), American basketball player
- John S. Greenspan (1938–2023), American academic
- Joseph Greenspan (born 1992), American soccer player
- Marshall Greenspan, American engineer
- Mauro Cabral Grinspan, (born 1971), Argentinian intersex and trans activist
- Melissa Greenspan (born 20th century), American actress
- Michael Greenspan, Canadian filmmaker
- Nachman Shlomo Greenspan (1878–1961), Polish-born UK rabbi and Talmudic scholar
- Nancy Thorndike Greenspan, American author
- Natan Grinszpan-Kikiel, birth name of Roman Romkowski, state security official in Communist Poland
- Patricia Greenspan, American professor
- Ryan Greenspan (born 1982), American paintball player
- Sholom Greenspan, American askan and social commentator
- Stanley Greenspan (1941–2010), American psychiatrist

== See also ==
- Greenspoon
- Greenspun
- Guidotti–Greenspan rule
- Greenspan Commission
