= Presidency of Ronald Reagan =

1981–1989 U.S. presidential administration

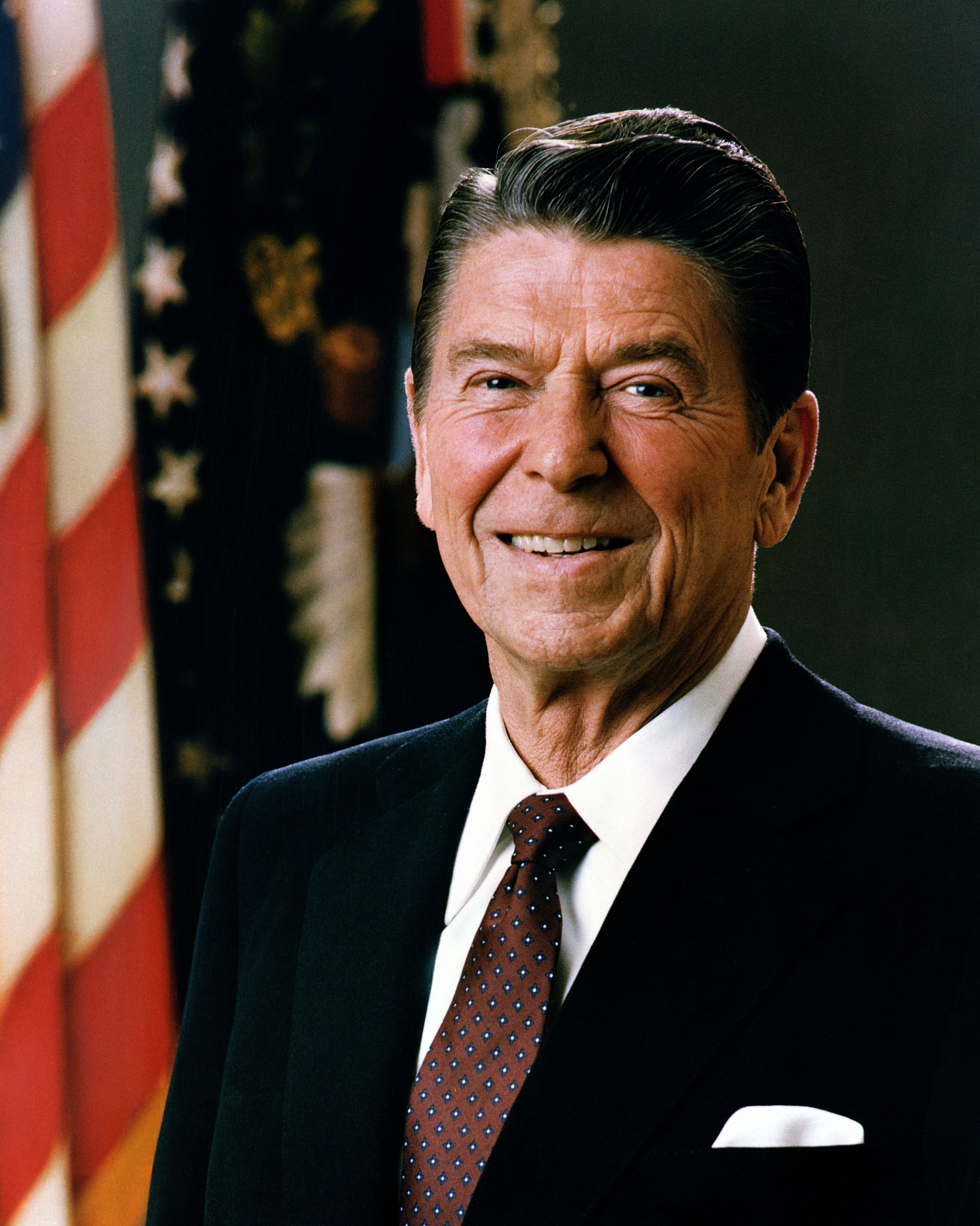
- Official portrait, 1981
- Presidency of Ronald Reagan; January 20, 1981 – January 20, 1989
- Vice President: George H. W. Bush
- Cabinet: See list
- Party: Republican
- Election: 1980; 1984
- Seat: White House
- Seal of the President

Ronald Reagan's tenure as the 40th president of the United States began with his first inauguration on January 20, 1981, and ended on January 20, 1989. Reagan, a Republican from California, took office after defeating the Democratic incumbent president Jimmy Carter and independent representative John B. Anderson in the 1980 presidential election. Four years later, he won re-election in the 1984 presidential election, after defeating the Democratic nominee Walter Mondale. Reagan was constitutionally limited to two terms and was succeeded by his vice president, George H. W. Bush, who won the 1988 presidential election. Reagan's 1980 landslide election resulted from a conservative shift to the right in American politics, including a loss of confidence in liberal, New Deal, and Great Society programs and priorities that had dominated the national agenda since the 1930s.

Domestically, the Reagan administration enacted a major tax cut, sought to cut non-military spending, and eliminated federal regulations. The administration's economic policies, known as "Reaganomics", were inspired by supply-side economics. The combination of tax cuts and an increase in defense spending led to budget deficits, and the federal debt increased significantly during Reagan's tenure. Reagan signed the Tax Reform Act of 1986, simplifying the tax code by reducing rates and removing several tax breaks, and the Immigration Reform and Control Act of 1986, which enacted sweeping changes to U.S. immigration law and granted amnesty to three million illegal immigrants. Reagan also appointed more federal judges than any other president, including four Supreme Court Justices.

Reagan's foreign policy stance was resolutely anti-communist. Its plan of action, known as the Reagan Doctrine, sought to roll back the global influence of the Soviet Union in an attempt to end the Cold War. Under his doctrine, the Reagan administration initiated a massive buildup of the United States military; promoted new technologies such as missile defense systems; and in 1983 undertook an invasion of Grenada, the first major overseas action by U.S. troops since the end of the Vietnam War. The administration also created controversy by granting aid to paramilitary forces seeking to overthrow leftist governments, particularly in war-torn Central America and Afghanistan. Specifically, the Reagan administration engaged in covert arms sales to Iran to fund Contra rebels in Nicaragua that were fighting to overthrow their nation's socialist government. The resulting Iran–Contra affair led to the conviction or resignation of several administration officials. During Reagan's second term, he worked with Soviet leader Mikhail Gorbachev to sign a major arms control agreement. In 1986, Congress overrode Reagan's veto of a bill intended to implement economic sanctions against South Africa's apartheid regime.

Historians and political scientists generally rank Reagan in the upper tier of American presidents, and consider him to be one of the most important presidents since Franklin D. Roosevelt. Supporters of Reagan's presidency have pointed to his contributions to the economic recovery of the 1980s, the peaceful end of the Cold War, and a broader restoration of American confidence. Reagan's presidency has also received criticism for rising budget deficits and wealth inequality during and after his presidency. Due to Reagan's popularity with the public and advocacy of American conservatism, some historians have described the period during and after his presidency as the Reagan era.

== Background ==
=== Conservative shift in politics ===
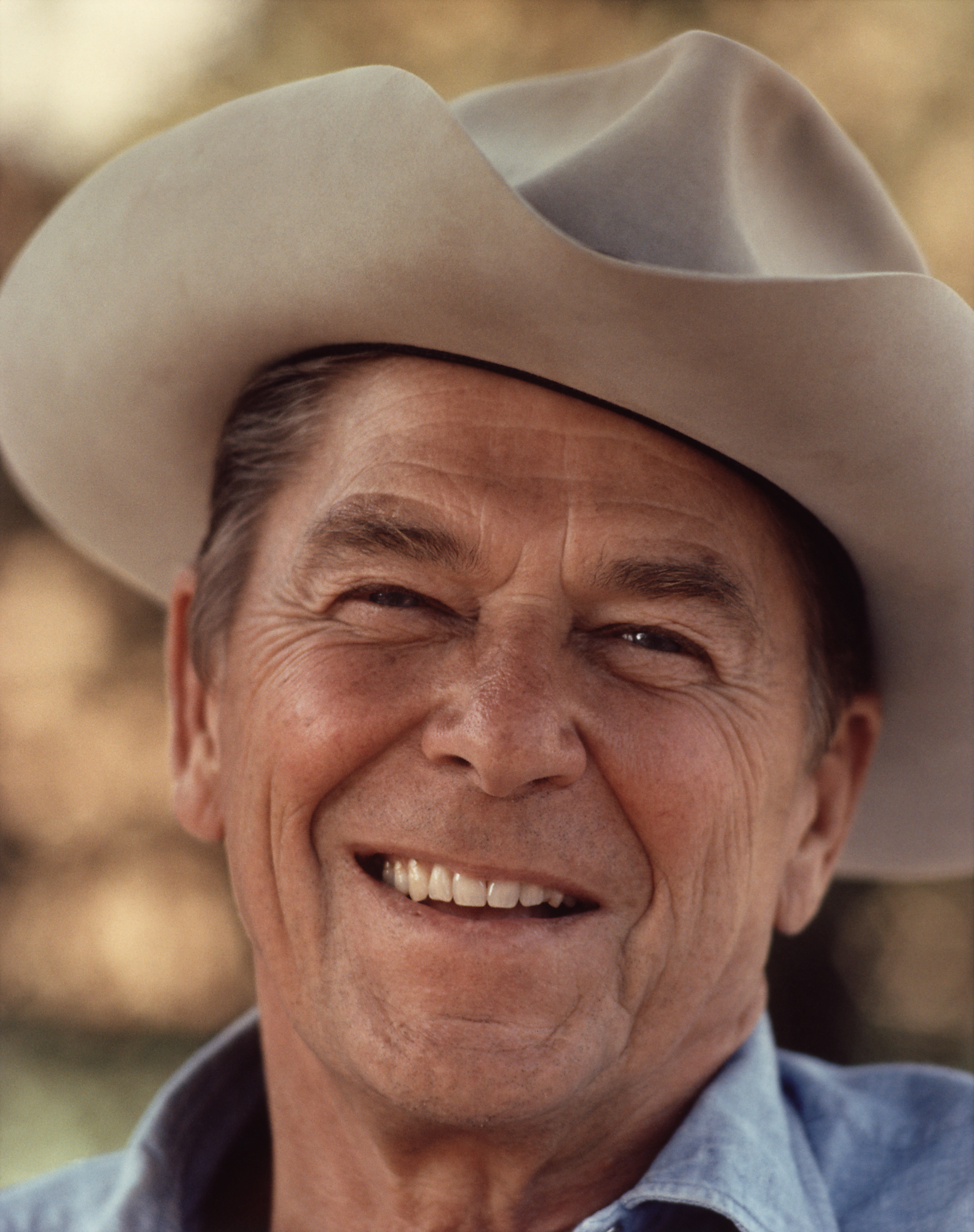
Ronald Reagan with a cowboy hat at Rancho Del Cielo, 1976.

Even prior to becoming president, Reagan was the leader of a dramatic conservative shift that undercut many of the domestic and foreign policies that had dominated the national agenda for decades. A major factor in the rise of conservatism was the growing distrust of government in the aftermath of the Watergate scandal. While distrust of high officials had been an American characteristic for two centuries, Watergate engendered heightened levels of suspicion and encouraged the media to engage in a vigorous search for scandals. An unexpected new factor was the emergence of the religious right as a cohesive political force that gave strong support to conservatism.

Other factors in the rise of the conservative movement were the emergence of a "culture war" as a triangular battle among conservatives, traditional liberals, and the New Left, involving such issues as individual freedom, divorce, sexual freedom, abortion, and homosexuality. A mass movement of population from the cities to the suburbs led to the creation of a new group of voters less attached to New Deal economic policies and machine politics. Meanwhile, it became socially acceptable for conservative Southern whites, especially well-educated suburbanites, to vote Republican. Though the civil rights legislation of the 1960s had been a triumphal issue for liberalism and had created a new, pro-Democratic black electorate, it had also destroyed the argument that whites had to vote Democratic to protect segregation in the South. Responding to these various trends, Reagan and other conservatives successfully presented conservative ideas as an alternative to a public that had grown disillusioned with New Deal liberalism and the Democratic Party. Reagan's charisma and speaking skills helped him frame conservatism as an optimistic, forward-looking vision for the country.

=== 1980 election ===
1980 Electoral College vote results

Reagan, who had served as Governor of California from 1967 to 1975, narrowly lost the 1976 Republican presidential primaries to incumbent president Gerald Ford. With the defeat of Ford by Democrat Jimmy Carter in the 1976 election, Reagan immediately became the front-runner for the 1980 Republican presidential nomination. A darling of the conservative movement, Reagan faced more moderate Republicans such as George H. W. Bush, Howard Baker, and Bob Dole in the 1980 Republican presidential primaries. After Bush won the Iowa caucuses, he became Reagan's primary challenger, but Reagan won the New Hampshire primary and most of the following primaries, gaining an insurmountable delegate lead by the end of March 1980. Ford was Reagan's first choice for his running mate, but Reagan backed away from the idea out of the fear of a "co-presidency" in which Ford would exercise an unusual degree of power. Reagan instead chose Bush, and the Reagan-Bush ticket was nominated at the 1980 Republican National Convention. Meanwhile, Carter won the Democratic nomination, defeating a primary challenge by Senator Ted Kennedy. Polls taken after the party conventions showed a tied race between Reagan and Carter, while independent candidate John B. Anderson had the support of many moderates.

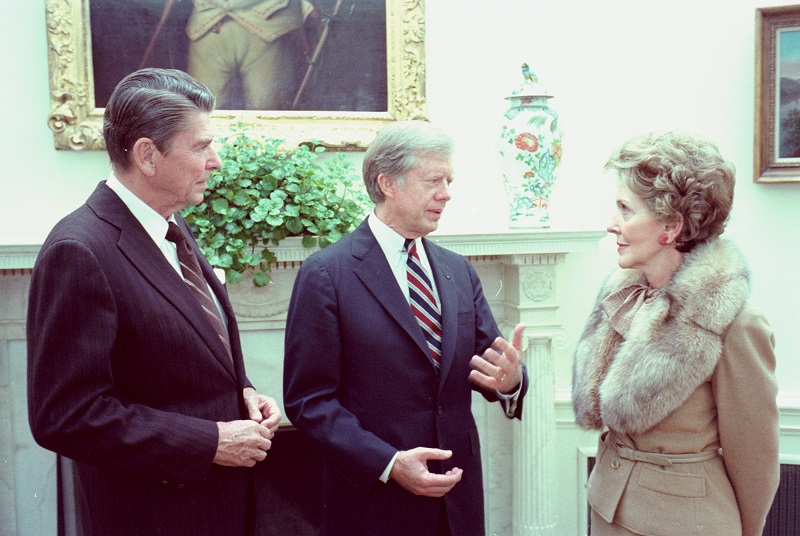
Outgoing president Jimmy Carter and President-elect Ronald Reagan with his wife Nancy in the Oval Office on November 20, 1980

The 1980 general campaign between Reagan and Carter was conducted amid a multitude of domestic concerns and the ongoing Iran hostage crisis. After winning the Republican nomination, Reagan pivoted to the center. Though he continued to champion a major tax cut, Reagan backed off from his support for free trade and the privatization of Social Security, and promised to consider arms control treaties with the Soviet Union. He instead sought to focus the race on Carter's handling of the economy. Mired with an approval rating in the low 30s, Carter also waged a negative campaign, focusing on the supposed risk of war if Reagan took office.

Reagan and Carter met in one presidential debate, held just one week before election day. Reagan delivered an effective performance, asking voters, "Are you better off today than you were four years ago?" In response to a characterization by Carter of his record regarding Medicare, Reagan replied with a phrase that helped define the election and endure in the political lexicon: "There you go again."

Though the race had been widely regarded as a close contest, Reagan won over the large majority of undecided voters. Reagan took 50.7% of the popular vote and 489 of the 538 electoral votes. Carter won 41% of the popular vote and 49 electoral votes, while Anderson won 6.6% of the popular vote. In the concurrent congressional elections, Republicans took control of the Senate for the first time since the 1950s, while Democrats retained control of the House of Representatives.

== Administration ==
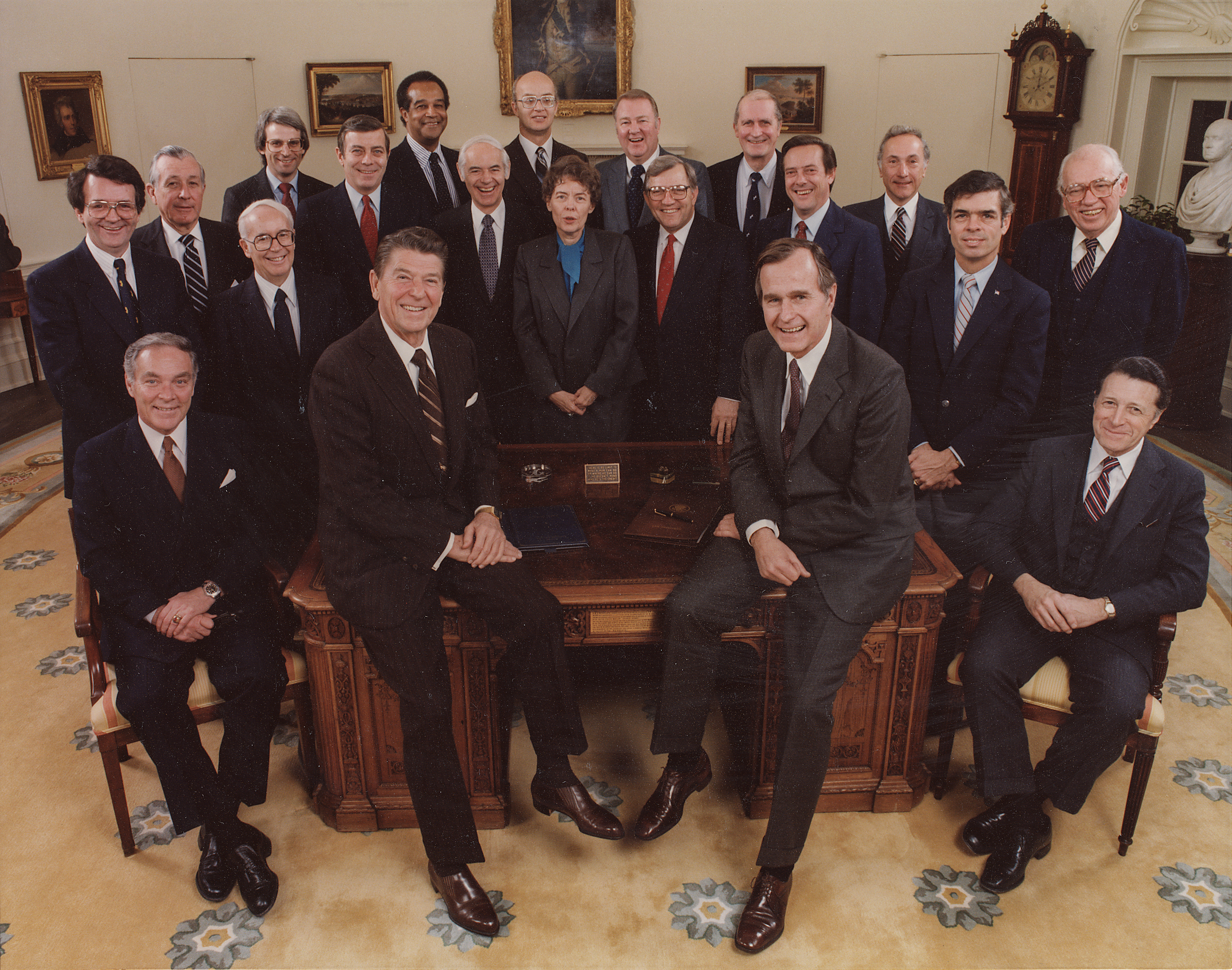
President Reagan and his cabinet in 1981

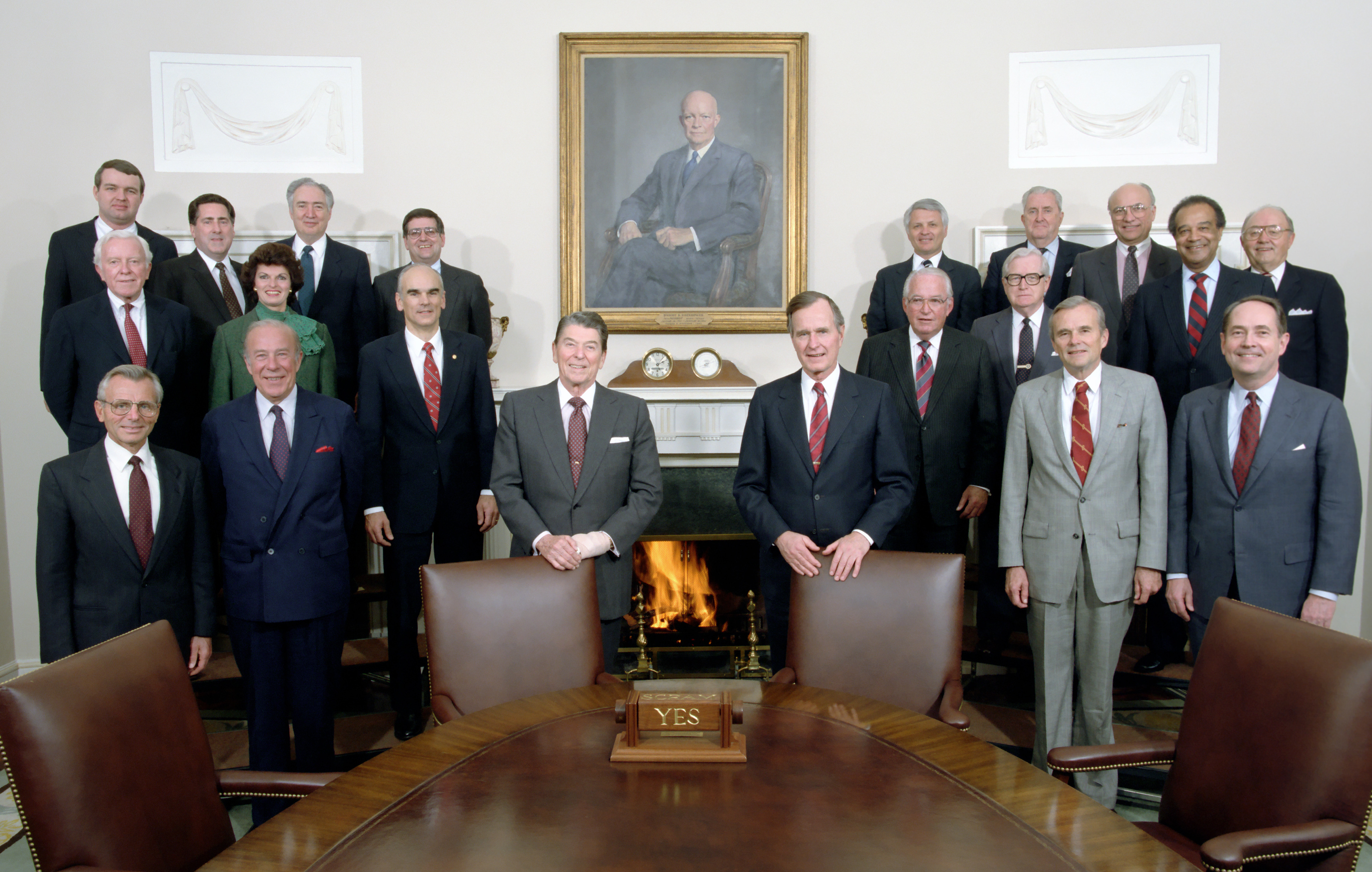
President Reagan and his cabinet in 1989

Reagan cabinet
Office	Name	Term
President	Ronald Reagan	1981–1989
Vice President	George H. W. Bush	1981–1989
Secretary of State	Alexander Haig	1981–1982
George Shultz	1982–1989
Secretary of the Treasury	Donald Regan	1981–1985
James Baker	1985–1988
Nicholas F. Brady	1988–1989
Secretary of Defense	Caspar Weinberger	1981–1987
Frank Carlucci	1987–1989
Attorney General	William French Smith	1981–1985
Edwin Meese	1985–1988
Dick Thornburgh	1988–1989
Secretary of the Interior	James G. Watt	1981–1983
William P. Clark Jr.	1983–1985
Donald P. Hodel	1985–1989
Secretary of Agriculture	John R. Block	1981–1986
Richard Lyng	1986–1989
Secretary of Commerce	Malcolm Baldrige Jr.	1981–1987
William Verity Jr.	1987–1989
Secretary of Labor	Raymond J. Donovan	1981–1985
Bill Brock	1985–1987
Ann Dore McLaughlin	1987–1989
Secretary of Health and Human Services	Richard Schweiker	1981–1983
Margaret Heckler	1983–1985
Otis Bowen	1985–1989
Secretary of Housing and Urban Development	Samuel Pierce	1981–1989
Secretary of Transportation	Drew Lewis	1981–1983
Elizabeth Dole	1983–1987
James H. Burnley IV	1987–1989
Secretary of Energy	James B. Edwards	1981–1982
Donald P. Hodel	1982–1985
John S. Herrington	1985–1989
Secretary of Education	Terrel Bell	1981–1984
William Bennett	1985–1988
Lauro Cavazos	1988–1989
Director of the Office of Management and Budget	David Stockman	1981–1985
James C. Miller III	1985–1988
Joe Wright	1988–1989
Director of Central Intelligence	William J. Casey	1981–1987
William H. Webster	1987–1989
United States Trade Representative	Bill Brock	1981–1985
Clayton Yeutter	1985–1989
Ambassador to the United Nations	Jeane Kirkpatrick	1981–1985
Vernon A. Walters	1985–1989
White House Chief of Staff	James Baker	1981–1985
Donald Regan	1985–1987
Howard Baker	1987–1988
Kenneth Duberstein	1988–1989
Counselor to the President	Edwin Meese	1981–1985
none	1985–1989

Reagan tapped James Baker, who had run Bush's 1980 campaign, as his first chief of staff. Baker, Deputy Chief of Staff Michael Deaver, and Counselor Edwin Meese formed the "troika", the key White House staffers early in Reagan's presidency. Baker quickly established himself as the most powerful member of the troika and the overseer of day-to-day operations, while Meese had nominal leadership of policy development and Deaver orchestrated Reagan's public appearances. Aside from the troika, other important White House staffers included Richard Darman and David Gergen.

Reagan chose Alexander Haig, a former general who had served as chief of staff to Richard Nixon, as his first secretary of state. Other major Cabinet appointees included Secretary of Defense Caspar Weinberger, a former Nixon cabinet official who would preside over an increase in defense spending, and Secretary of the Treasury Donald Regan, a bank executive. Reagan selected David Stockman, a young congressman from Michigan, as the director of the Office of Management and Budget. CIA director William J. Casey emerged as an important figure in the administration, as the CIA would figure prominently into Reagan's Cold War initiatives. Reagan downgraded the importance of the national security advisor, and six different individuals held that position during Reagan's presidency.

Haig left the cabinet in 1982 after clashing with other members of the Reagan administration, and was replaced by another former Nixon administration official, George P. Shultz. By 1982, National Security Advisor William P. Clark Jr., Ambassador to the United Nations Jeane Kirkpatrick, and CIA Director Casey had established themselves as the major figures in the formulation of the administration's foreign policy. Shultz eventually emerged as the administration's most influential foreign policy figure, moving the administration towards a less confrontational policy with the Soviet Union.

Baker and Treasury Secretary Regan switched positions at the beginning of Reagan's second term. Regan centralized power within his office, and he took on the responsibilities that had been held by Baker, Deaver, and Meese, the latter of whom succeeded William French Smith as attorney general in 1985. Regan frequently clashed with First Lady Nancy Reagan, and he left the administration in the wake of the Iran–Contra affair and Republican losses in the 1986 mid-term elections. Regan was replaced by former Senate Majority Leader Howard Baker.

== Judicial appointments ==
=== Supreme Court ===
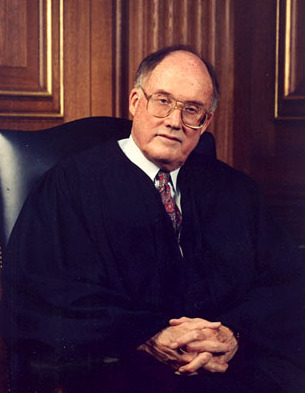
Reagan appointed William Rehnquist to the office of chief justice in 1986; he served until his death in 2005

Reagan made four successful appointments to the Supreme Court during his eight years in office. In 1981, he successfully nominated Sandra Day O'Connor to succeed Associate Justice Potter Stewart, fulfilling a campaign promise to name the first woman to the Supreme Court. Democrats, who had planned to vigorously oppose Reagan's nominations to the Supreme Court, approved of the nomination of O'Connor. However, the Christian right was astonished and dismayed with O'Connor, who they feared would not overturn the Supreme Court's decision in Roe v. Wade, which had established abortion as protected from government interference via the Constitution. O'Connor served on the Supreme Court until 2006, and was generally considered to be a centrist conservative.

In 1986, Reagan elevated Associate Justice William Rehnquist to the position of Chief Justice of the United States after Warren Burger chose to retire. Rehnquist, a member of the conservative wing of the court, was the third sitting associate justice to be elevated to chief justice, after Edward Douglass White and Harlan F. Stone. Reagan successfully nominated Antonin Scalia to fill Rehnquist's position as an associate justice of the Supreme Court. Scalia became a member of the court's conservative wing.

Reagan faced greater difficulties in filling the final Supreme Court vacancy, which arose due to the retirement of Lewis F. Powell Jr. Reagan nominated Robert Bork in July 1987, but the nomination was rejected by the Senate in October 1987. Later that month, Reagan announced the nomination of Douglas H. Ginsburg, but Ginsburg withdrew from consideration in November 1987. Finally, Reagan nominated Anthony Kennedy, who won Senate confirmation in February 1988. Along with O'Connor, Kennedy served as the key swing vote on the Supreme Court in the decades after Reagan left office.

=== Other courts ===
Reagan appointed over 370 judges to the United States courts of appeals and the United States district courts, more than any other president. The vast majority of his judicial appointees were conservative, and many of the appointees were affiliated with the conservative Federalist Society. Partly because Congress passed a law creating new federal judicial positions in 1984, Reagan had appointed nearly half of the federal judiciary by the time he left office in 1989.

== Assassination attempt ==
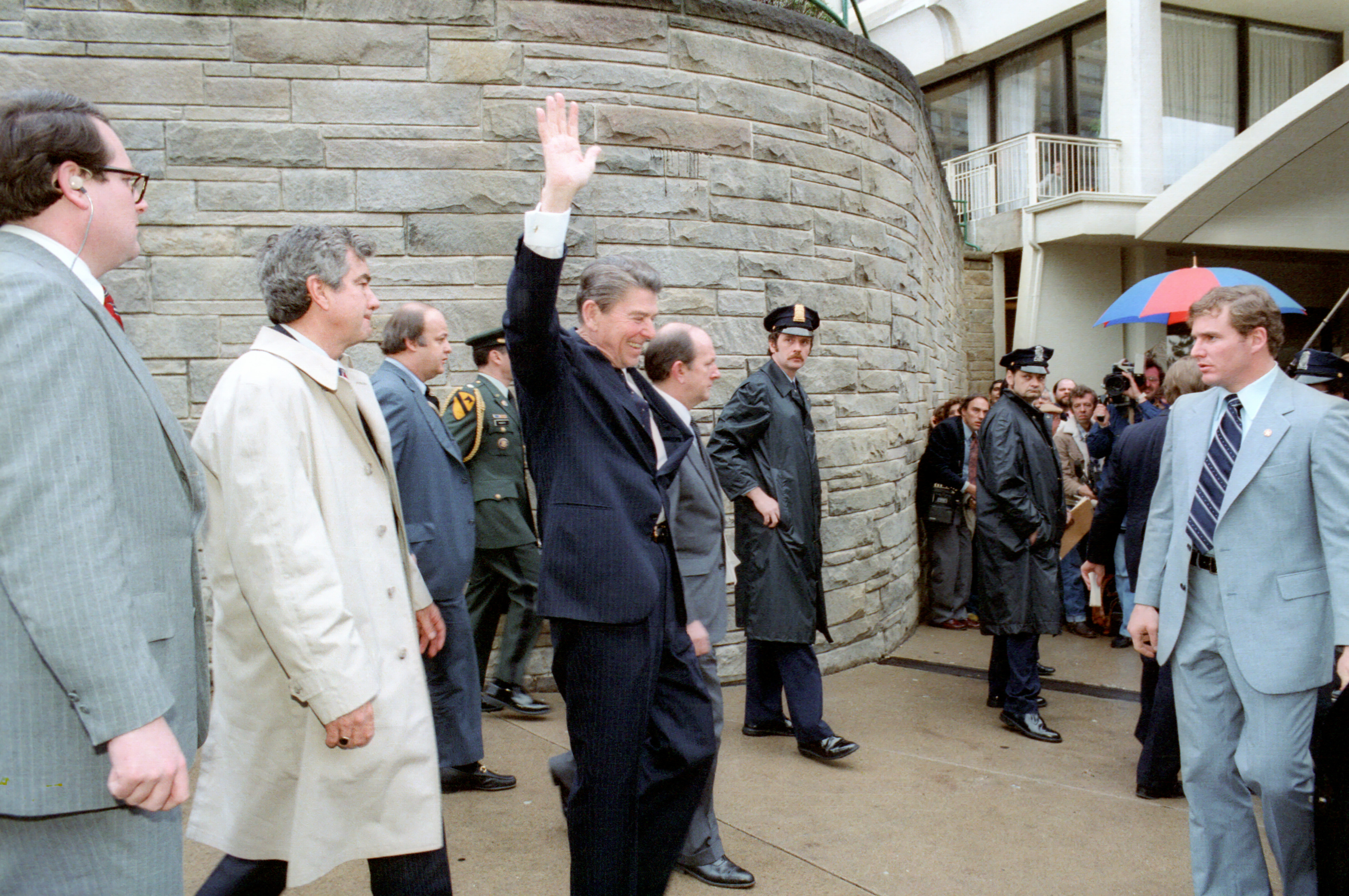
Reagan (center) waves just before he is shot on March 30, 1981

On March 30, 1981, only 69 days into the new administration, Reagan, his press secretary James Brady, Washington police officer Thomas Delahanty, and Secret Service agent Tim McCarthy were struck by gunfire from would-be assassin John Hinckley Jr. outside the Washington Hilton Hotel. Although Reagan was initially reported to be "close to death" upon arrival at George Washington University Hospital, he underwent surgery and recovered quickly from a broken rib, a punctured lung, and internal bleeding. Reagan was released from the hospital on April 11, becoming the first serving president to survive being wounded in an assassination attempt. The failed assassination attempt had great influence on Reagan's popularity; polls indicated his approval rating to be around 73%. Many pundits and journalists later described the failed assassination as a critical moment in Reagan's presidency, as his newfound popularity provided critical momentum in passing his domestic agenda.

== Domestic affairs ==
Reagan used his White House staff to shape major domestic policies. His chief of staff made heavy use of the Office of Policy Development in supervising cabinet action on the Reagan initiatives.

=== "Reaganomics" and taxation ===
==== Economic Recovery Tax Act of 1981 ====
Reagan implemented neoliberal economic policies based on supply-side economics, advocating a laissez-faire philosophy and free-market fiscal policy. Reagan's taxation policies resembled those instituted by President Calvin Coolidge and Treasury Secretary Andrew Mellon in the 1920s. Reagan's team was also strongly influenced by contemporary economists such as Arthur Laffer, who rejected the then-dominant views of Keynesian economists. Reagan relied on Laffer and other economists to argue that tax cuts would reduce inflation, which went against the prevailing Keynesian view. Supply-side advocates also asserted that cutting taxes would ultimately lead to higher government revenue due to economic growth, a proposition that was challenged by many economists.

Outlining his plan for tax reduction legislation from the Oval Office in a televised address, July 1981

Republican congressman Jack Kemp and Republican senator William Roth had nearly won passage of a major tax cut during Carter's presidency, but Carter had prevented passage of the bill due to concerns about the deficit. Reagan made passage of the Kemp–Roth bill his top domestic priority upon taking office. As Democrats controlled the House of Representatives, passage of any bill would require the support of some House Democrats in addition to the support of congressional Republicans. Reagan's victory in the 1980 presidential campaign had united Republicans around his leadership, while conservative Democrats like Phil Gramm of Texas (who later became a Republican) were eager to back some of Reagan's conservative policies. Throughout 1981, Reagan frequently met with members of Congress, focusing especially on winning support from conservative Southern Democrats. Reagan also benefited from a conservative majority in the House during his first two years as president, with an estimated 230 votes during the 97th Congress, although this changed after the Democratic gains in the 1982 election, with House control switching to liberals within the Democratic caucus.

In July 1981, the Senate voted 89–11 in favor of the tax cut bill favored by Reagan, and the House subsequently approved the bill in a 238–195 vote. The Economic Recovery Tax Act of 1981 cut the top marginal tax rate from 70% to 50%, lowered the capital gains tax from 28% to 20%, more than tripled the amount of inherited money exempt from the estate tax, and cut the corporate tax. Reagan's success in passing a major tax bill and cutting the federal budget was hailed as the "Reagan Revolution" by some reporters; one columnist wrote that the Reagan's legislative success represented the "most formidable domestic initiative any president has driven through since the Hundred Days of Franklin Roosevelt".

==== Later tax acts ====
Faced with concerns about the mounting federal debt, Reagan agreed to raise taxes, signing the Tax Equity and Fiscal Responsibility Act of 1982 (TEFRA). Many of Reagan's conservative supporters condemned TEFRA, but Reagan argued that his administration would be unable to win further budget cuts without the tax hike. Among other provisions, TEFRA doubled the federal cigarette tax and rescinded a portion of the corporate tax cuts from the 1981 tax bill. By 1983, the amount of federal tax had fallen for all or almost all American taxpayers, but most strongly affected the wealthy; the proportion of income paid in taxes by the richest one percent fell from 29.8 percent to 24.8 percent. Partly due to the poor economy, Reagan's legislative momentum dissipated after his first year in office, and his party lost several seats in the House in the 1982 congressional elections. Compared to other midterm elections, the losses were relatively small for the party holding the presidency, but conservative Democrats were less open to Reagan's initiatives after 1982. As deficits continued to be an issue, Reagan signed another bill that raised taxes, the Deficit Reduction Act of 1984.

With Donald Regan taking over as chief of staff in 1985, the Reagan administration made simplification of the tax code the central focus of its second term domestic agenda. Working with Speaker of the House Tip O'Neill, a Democrat who also favored tax reform, Reagan overcame significant opposition from members of Congress in both parties to pass the Tax Reform Act of 1986. The act simplified the tax code by reducing the number of tax brackets to four and slashing a number of tax breaks. The top rate was dropped to 28%, but capital gains taxes were increased on those with the highest incomes from 20% to 28%. The increase of the lowest tax bracket from 11% to 15% was more than offset by expansion of the personal exemption, standard deduction, and earned income tax credit. The net result was the removal of six million poor Americans from the income tax roll and a reduction of income tax liability at all income levels. The net effect of Reagan's tax bills was that overall tax burden held steady at roughly 19 percent of gross national product.

=== Government spending ===
Federal finances and GDP during Reagan's presidency
Fiscal Year	Receipts	Outlays	Surplus/ Deficit	GDP	Debt as a % of GDP
1981	599.3	678.2	−79.0	3,133.2	25.2
1982	617.8	745.7	−128.0	3,313.4	27.9
1983	600.6	808.4	−207.8	3,536.0	32.2
1984	666.4	851.8	−185.4	3,949.2	33.1
1985	734.0	946.3	−212.3	4,265.1	35.3
1986	769.2	990.4	−221.2	4,526.3	38.5
1987	854.3	1,004.0	−149.7	4,767.7	39.6
1988	909.2	1,064.4	−155.2	5,138.6	39.9
1989	991.1	1,143.7	−152.6	5,554.7	39.4
Ref.					

Reagan prioritized tax cuts over spending cuts, arguing that lower revenue would eventually require lower spending. Nonetheless, Reagan was determined to decrease government spending and roll back or dismantle Great Society programs such as Medicaid and the Office of Economic Opportunity. In August 1981, Reagan signed the Omnibus Budget Reconciliation Act of 1981, which cut federal funding for social programs like food stamps, school lunch programs, and Medicaid. The Comprehensive Employment and Training Act, which had provided for the employment of 300,000 workers in 1980, was also repealed, and the administration tightened eligibility for unemployment benefits. Notably absent from the budget cuts was the Department of Defense, which saw its budget bolstered.

Reagan experienced several legislative successes in his first year in office, but his attempts to cut federal domestic spending after 1981 met increasing congressional resistance. Spending on programs like Supplemental Security Income, Medicaid, the earned income tax credit, and Aid to Families with Dependent Children all increased after 1982. The number of federal civilian employees rose during Reagan's tenure, from 2.9 million to 3.1 million. Reagan's policy of New Federalism, which sought to shift the responsibility for most social programs to state governments, found little support in Congress.

In 1981, OMB Director David Stockman won Reagan's approval to seek cuts to Social Security in 1981, but this plan was poorly received in Congress. In 1982, Reagan established the bipartisan National Commission on Social Security Reform to make recommendations to secure the long-term integrity of Social Security. The commission rejected Social Security privatization and other major changes to the program, but recommended expanding the Social Security base (by including exempt federal and nonprofit employees), raising Social Security taxes, and reducing some payments. These recommendations were enacted in the Social Security Amendments of 1983, which received bipartisan support. While Reagan avoided cuts to Social Security and Medicare for most individuals, his administration attempted to purge many people from the Social Security disability rolls. Reagan's inability to implement major cuts to Social Security solidified its status as the "third rail" of U.S. politics, and future administrations would be reluctant to propose cuts to the popular program.

=== Deficits ===
As Reagan was unwilling to match his tax cuts with cuts to defense spending or Social Security, rising deficits became an issue. These deficits were exacerbated by the early 1980s recession, which cut into federal revenue. Unable to win further domestic spending cuts, and pressured to address the deficit, Reagan was forced to raise taxes after 1981. Nonetheless, the national debt more than tripled between fiscal year 1980 and fiscal year 1989, going from $914 billion to $2.7 trillion, while national debt as a percentage of GDP rose from 33 percent in 1981 to 53 percent in 1989. Reagan never submitted a balanced budget during his time in office.

In an effort to lower the national debt, Congress passed the Gramm–Rudman–Hollings Balanced Budget Act, which called for automatic spending cuts if Congress was unable to eliminate deficits through the regular budget-making process. However, Congress found ways around the automatic cuts and deficits continued to rise, ultimately leading to the passage of the Omnibus Budget Reconciliation Act of 1990.

=== Economy ===
Reagan took office in the midst of poor economic conditions, as the country experienced stagflation, a phenomenon in which both inflation and unemployment were high. The economy experienced a brief period of growth early in Reagan's first year in office, but plunged into a recession in July 1981. As the recession continued in the first two years of Reagan's presidency, many within Reagan's administration blamed the policies of Paul Volcker, the chair of the Federal Reserve. But Reagan himself never criticized Volcker. Volcker sought to fight inflation by pursuing a policy of "tight money" in which interest rates were set at a high level. High interest rates would restrict lending and investment, which would in turn lower inflation, raise unemployment and, at least in the short term, reduce economic growth. Unemployment reached a high of nearly 11% in 1982, poverty rate rose from 11.7 percent to 15 percent. The country emerged from recession in 1983, but not all shared equally in the economic recovery, and economic inequality and the number of homeless individuals both increased during the 1980s. Fearful of damaging confidence in the economic recovery, Reagan nominated Volcker to a second term in 1983, and Volcker remained in office until 1987. Inflation dropped to approximately 3.5% in 1985, while the unemployment rate fell to about 5% in 1988. In 1987, Reagan appointed conservative economist Alan Greenspan to succeed Volcker, and Greenspan would lead the Federal Reserve until 2006. Greenspan raised interest rates in another attempt to curb inflation, setting off a stock market crash in October 1987 known as "Black Monday", but the markets stabilized and recovered in the following weeks.

=== Labor ===
Income inequality and union participation have had a distinctly inverse relationship, with the disparity increasing since the 1980s.

In August 1981, the Professional Air Traffic Controllers Organization (PATCO), which consisted of federal employees, voted to go on a labor strike in hopes of receiving better pay and benefits. After the vote, Reagan announced that the strikers would be fired if they did not return to work within forty-eight hours. After the deadline passed, Reagan fired over 10,000 air traffic controllers, while approximately 40 percent of the union members returned to work. Reagan's handling of the strike was strongly criticized by union leaders, but it won the approval of his conservative base of voters and others in the public. The breaking of the PATCO strike demoralized organized labor, and the number of strikes fell dramatically in the 1980s. Many of the strikes that did occur, including the Arizona copper mine strike of 1983, the 1983 Greyhound bus driver strike, and the 1985–86 Hormel strike, ended with dismissal of the strikers. With the assent of Reagan's sympathetic National Labor Relations Board appointees, many companies also won wage and benefit cutbacks from unions, especially in the manufacturing sector. During Reagan's time in office, the share of employees who were part of a labor union dropped from approximately one-fourth of the total workforce to approximately one-sixth of the total workforce.

=== Deregulation ===
Reagan sought to loosen federal regulation of economic activities, and he appointed key officials who shared this agenda. According to historian William Leuchtenburg, by 1986, the Reagan administration eliminated almost half of the federal regulations that had existed in 1981. The Federal Communications Commission aggressively deregulated the broadcasting industry, eliminating the Fairness Doctrine and other restrictions. The 1982 Garn–St. Germain Depository Institutions Act deregulated savings and loan associations and allowed banks to provide adjustable-rate mortgages. Reagan also eliminated numerous government positions and dismissed numerous federal employees, including the entire staff of the Employment and Training Administration. Secretary of the Interior James G. Watt implemented policies designed to open up federal territories to oil drilling and surface mining. Under EPA Director Anne Gorsuch, the EPA's budget was dramatically reduced and the EPA loosely enforced environmental regulations.

==== Savings and loan crisis ====
After the passage of the Garn–St. Germain Depository Institutions Act, savings and loans associations engaged in riskier activities, and the leaders of some institutions embezzled funds. In what became known as the Savings and loan crisis, a total of 747 financial institutions failed and needed to be rescued with $160 billion in taxpayer dollars. As an indication of this scandal's size, Martin Mayer wrote at the time, "The theft from the taxpayer by the community that fattened on the growth of the savings and loan (S&L) industry in the 1980s is the worst public scandal in American history...Measuring by money, [or] by the misallocation of national resources...the S&L outrage makes Teapot Dome and Credit Mobilier seem minor episodes."

=== Immigration ===
The 1980s saw the highest rate of immigration to the United States since the 1910s, and the proportion of the foreign-born population reached its highest level since the 1940s. Reagan did not make immigration a focus of his administration, but he came to support a package of reforms sponsored by Republican senator Alan Simpson and Democratic congressman Romano Mazzoli, which he signed into law as the Immigration Reform and Control Act in November 1986. The act made it illegal to knowingly hire or recruit undocumented immigrants, required employers to attest to their employees' immigration status, and granted amnesty to approximately three million undocumented immigrants who had entered the United States before January 1, 1982, and had lived in the country continuously. The bill was also contained provisions designed to enhance security measures at the Mexico–United States border. Upon signing the act at a ceremony held beside the newly refurbished Statue of Liberty, Reagan said, "The legalization provisions in this act will go far to improve the lives of a class of individuals who now must hide in the shadows, without access to many of the benefits of a free and open society. Very soon many of these men and women will be able to step into the sunlight and, ultimately, if they choose, they may become Americans." The bill was largely unsuccessful at halting illegal immigration, and the population of illegal immigrants rose from 5 million in 1986 to 11.1 million in 2013.

=== Criminal and anti-drug policy ===
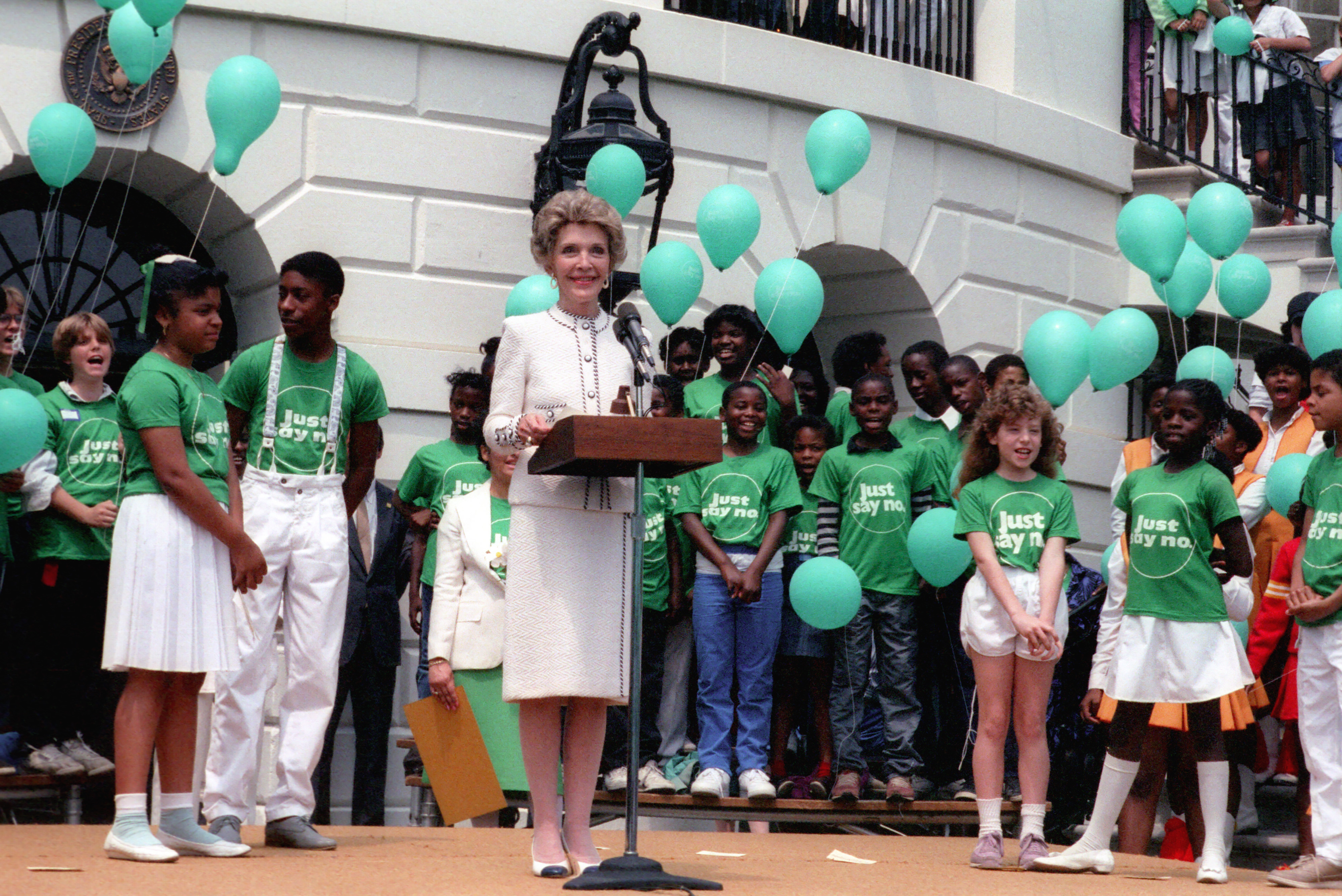
First Lady Nancy Reagan at a Just Say No rally at the White House

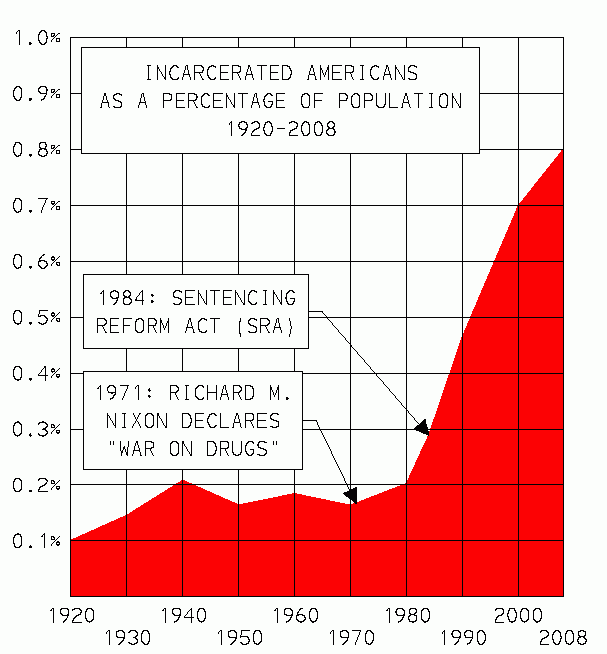
Graph demonstrating increases in U.S. incarceration rate

Not long after being sworn into office, Reagan declared more militant policies in the "war on drugs". He promised a "planned, concerted campaign" against all drugs, in hopes of decreasing drug use, particularly among adolescents. The "crack epidemic", which saw a large number of individuals become addicted to crack cocaine and may have played a role in numerous murders, emerged as a major area of public concern. First Lady Nancy Reagan made the war on drugs her main cause as First Lady, founding the "Just Say No" drug awareness campaign.

Concerns about drug use prompted Congress to pass legislation such as the Comprehensive Crime Control Act of 1984 and the Anti-Drug Abuse Act of 1986, the latter of which granted $1.7 billion to fight drugs and established a mandatory minimum penalties for drug offenses. Reagan also signed the Anti-Drug Abuse Act of 1988, which further increased criminal penalties for drug use and established the Office of National Drug Control Policy. Critics charged that Reagan's policies promoted significant racial disparities in the prison population, were ineffective in reducing the availability of drugs or crime on the street, and came at a great financial and human cost for American society. Supporters argued that the numbers for adolescent drug users declined during Reagan's years in office.

On May 19, 1986, President Reagan signed the Firearm Owners Protection Act, which amended the Gun Control Act of 1968, prohibiting the transfer or possession of machine guns. In 1989, Reagan said "I do not believe in taking away the right of the citizen to own guns for sporting, for hunting and so forth, or for home defense; but I do believe that an AK-47, a machine gun, is not a sporting weapon or needed for defense of a home."

=== Social policies and civil rights ===
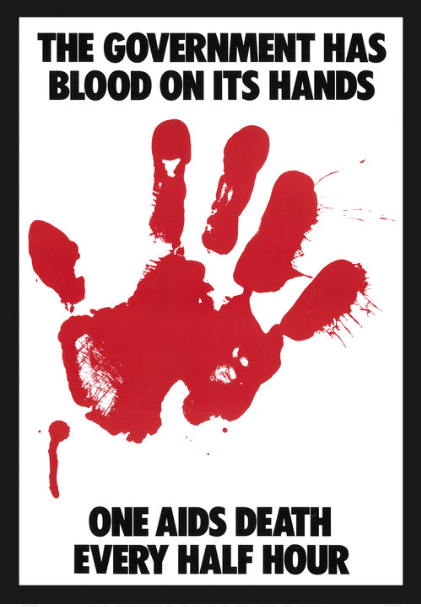
The Reagan administration was criticized both contemporaneously, as seen in this 1988 poster from ACT-UP, and retrospectively for its response to the AIDS epidemic.

Reagan was largely unable to enact his ambitious social policy agenda, which included a federal ban on abortions and an end to desegregation busing. Despite the lack of major social policy legislation, Reagan was able to influence social policy through regulations and the appointment of conservative Supreme Court Justices.

==== School prayer ====
With Reagan's support, conservative Republican senator Jesse Helms led an effort to prevent the Supreme Court from reviewing state and local laws mandating school prayer, but Republican senators like Lowell Weicker and Barry Goldwater blocked passage of Helms' bill. Reagan campaigned vigorously to restore organized prayer to the schools, first as a moment of prayer and later as a moment of silence. His election reflected an opposition to Engel v. Vitale, which prohibited state officials from composing an official state prayer and requiring that it be recited in the public schools. In 1981, he proposed a constitutional amendment on school prayer, which stated: "Nothing in this Constitution shall be construed to prohibit individual or group prayer in public schools or other public institutions. No person shall be required by the United States or by any state to participate in prayer." In 1984, he again raised the issue to Congress. In 1985, he expressed his disappointment that the Supreme Court ruling still banned a moment of silence for public schools, and said that efforts to reinstitute prayer in public schools were "an uphill battle". In 1987, he renewed his call for Congress to support voluntary prayer in schools.

==== Civil rights ====
In 1982, Reagan signed a bill extending the Voting Rights Act for 25 years after a grass-roots lobbying and legislative campaign forced him to abandon his plan to ease that law's restrictions. He also reluctantly accepted the continuation of affirmative action programs and the establishment of Martin Luther King Jr. Day as a federal holiday. The Equal Employment Opportunity Commission and the Justice Department both prosecuted far fewer civil rights cases per year than they had under Carter. In 1988, Reagan vetoed the Civil Rights Restoration Act, but his veto was overridden by Congress. Reagan had argued that the legislation infringed on states' rights and the rights of churches and business owners.

==== LGBTQ rights and AIDS ====
No civil rights legislation for gay individuals passed during Reagan's tenure. Many in the Reagan administration, including Communications Director Pat Buchanan, were hostile to the gay community, as were many religious leaders who were important allies to the administration. Gay rights and the growing HIV/AIDS emerged as an important matter of public concern in 1985 after it was disclosed that actor Rock Hudson, a personal friend of President Reagan, was receiving treatment for AIDS. As public anxiety over AIDS rose, the Supreme Court upheld a state law that criminalized homosexuality in the case of Bowers v. Hardwick. Though Surgeon General C. Everett Koop advocated for a public health campaign designed to reduce the spread of AIDS by raising awareness and promoting the use of condoms, Reagan rejected Koop's proposals in favor of abstinence-only sex education. By 1989, approximately 60,000 Americans had died of AIDS, and liberals strongly criticized Reagan's response to the HIV/AIDS crisis. On the 1980 campaign trail, Reagan spoke of the gay rights movement:

My criticism is that the gay movement isn't just asking for civil rights; it's asking for recognition and acceptance of an alternative lifestyle which I do not believe society can condone, nor can I.

=== Environmental policy ===
Reagan's strong preferences for limited federal involvement and deregulation extended to the environment. His main goal was to lessen the burden of regulation on businesses to promote more economic activity in the United States. Because of this policy, Reagan refused to renew the Clean Air Act during his administration. Reagan lessened existing regulations on pollution, cut funding to government environmental agencies, and appointed known anti-environmentalist individuals to key positions presiding over these organizations.

When Reagan took office in 1981, he "attempted to reduce" money that was directed towards studying the burgeoning field of global warming and human-driven climate change. In the early 1980s, the study of the intersection between human activity and climate change was still in its infancy and scientists were far from a consensus on the topic.

In 1987, the Reagan administration signed the Montreal Protocol in an effort to reduce emissions that damage the ozone layer.

=== Mass surveillance ===
Citing national security concerns, the president's national security team pressed for more surveillance power early during Reagan's first term. Their recommendations were based upon the premise that the federal government's intelligence and counterintelligence capabilities had been weakened by presidents Carter and Ford. On December 4, 1981, Reagan signed Executive Order 12333. This presidential directive broadened the power of the government's intelligence community; mandated rules for spying on United States citizens, permanent residents, and on anyone within the United States; and also directed the attorney general and others to create further policies and procedures for what information intelligence agencies can collect, retain, and share.

== Foreign affairs ==
=== Escalation of the Cold War ===
Reagan made 24 international trips to 26 different countries during his presidency.

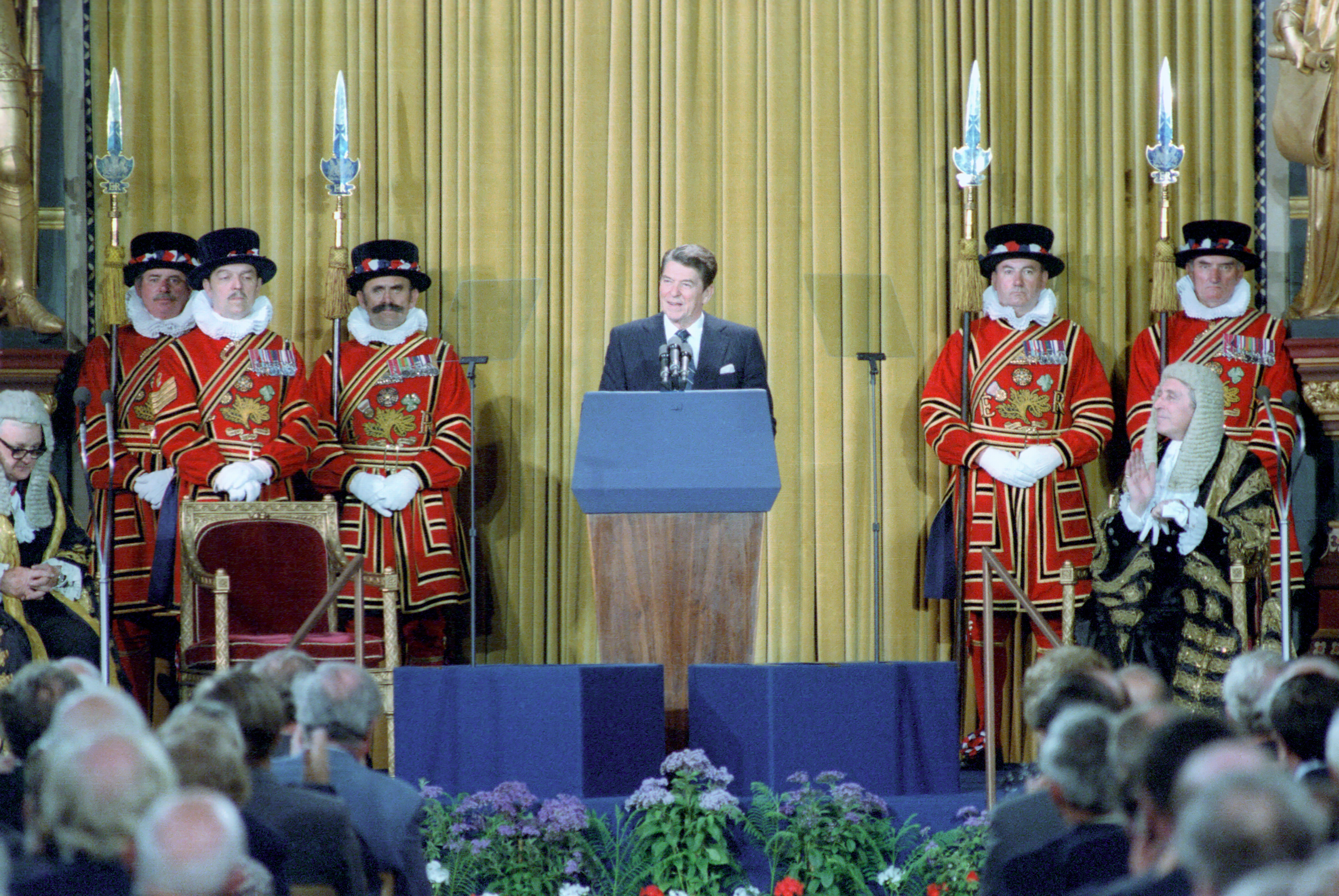
As the first U.S. president invited to speak before the British Parliament (June 8, 1982), Reagan predicted Marxism-Leninism would end up on the "ash heap of history"

Reagan escalated the Cold War, accelerating a reversal from the policy of détente which had begun in 1979 after the Soviet invasion of Afghanistan. Reagan feared that the Soviet Union had gained a military advantage over the United States, and the Reagan administration hoped that heightened military spending would grant the U.S. military superiority and weaken the Soviet economy. Reagan ordered a massive buildup of the United States Armed Forces, directing funding to the B-1 Lancer bomber, the B-2 Spirit bomber, cruise missiles, the MX missile, and the 600-ship Navy. In response to Soviet deployment of the SS-20, Reagan oversaw NATO's deployment of the Pershing missile in West Germany. The president also strongly denounced the Soviet Union and Communism in moral terms, describing the Soviet Union as an "evil empire". Despite this heavy rhetoric, the Reagan administration continued arms control talks with the Soviet Union in the form of "START". Unlike the "SALT" treaties of the 1970s, which set upper limits on the size of nuclear arsenals, the proposed START treaty would require both sides to reduce their existing nuclear arsenals.

==== Strategic Defense Initiative ====
In March 1983, Reagan introduced the Strategic Defense Initiative (SDI), a defense project that would have used ground- and space-based systems to protect the United States from attack by strategic nuclear ballistic missiles. Reagan believed that this defense shield could make nuclear war impossible. Many scientists and national security experts criticized the project as costly and technologically infeasible, and critics dubbed SDI as "Star Wars" in reference to a popular film series of the same name. Ultimately, the SDI would be canceled in 1993 due to concerns about its cost and effectiveness as well as a changing international situation. However, the Soviets became concerned about the possible effects SDI would have and viewed its development as a violation of the Anti-Ballistic Missile Treaty. In protest of SDI, the Soviet Union broke off arms control talks, and U.S.-Soviet relations descended to their lowest point since the early 1960s. The Cold War tensions influenced works of popular culture such as the films The Day After and WarGames (both 1983), and the song "99 Luftballons" (1983) by Nena, each of which exhibited the rising public anxiety for the possibility of a nuclear war.

=== Reagan Doctrine ===
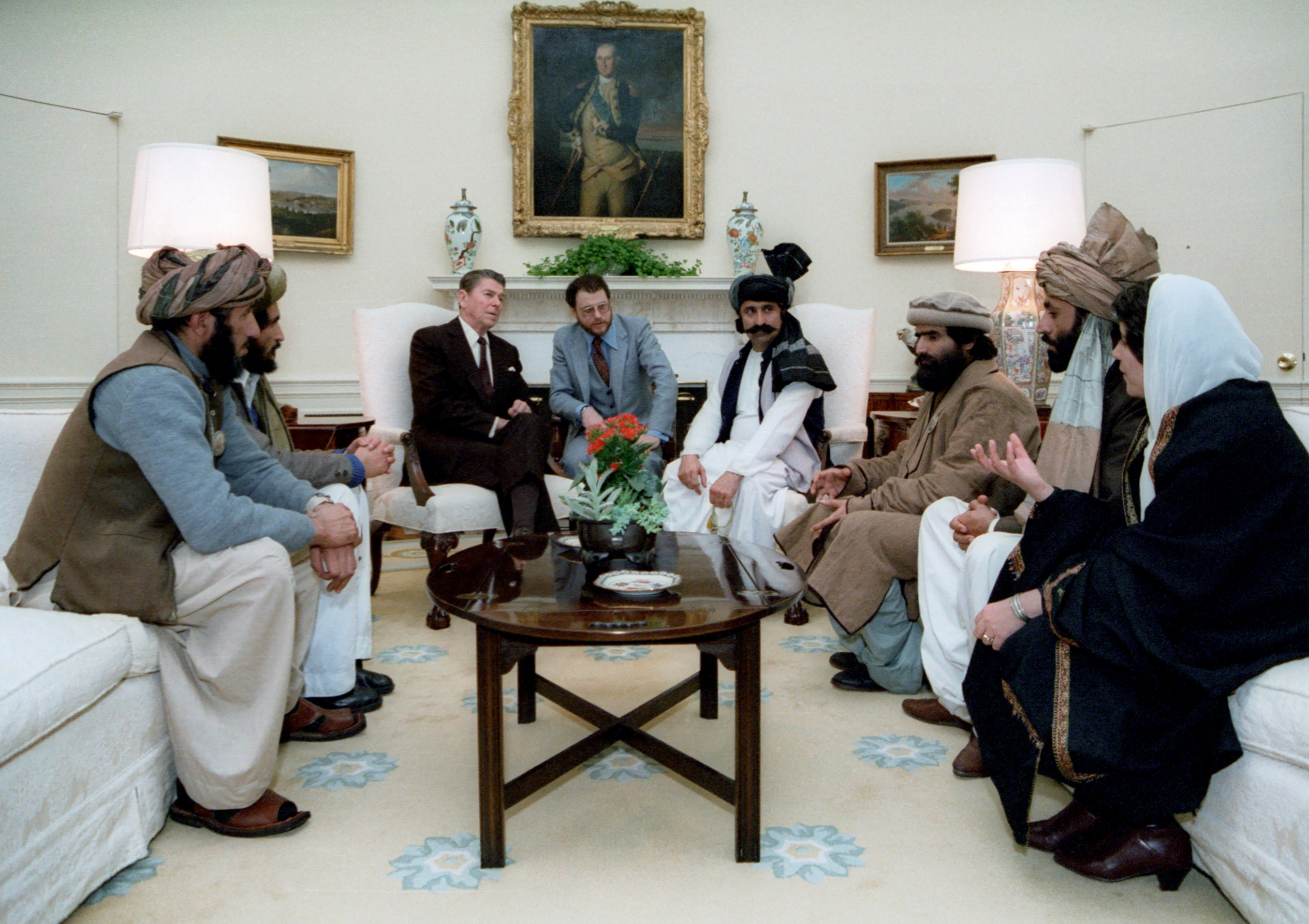
Meeting with leaders of the Afghan Mujahideen in the Oval Office, 1983

Under a policy that came to be known as the Reagan Doctrine, the Reagan administration provided overt and covert aid to anti-communist resistance movements in an effort to "rollback" Soviet-backed communist governments in Africa, Asia, and Latin America. In Eastern Europe, the CIA provided support to the Polish opposition group, Solidarity, ensuring that it stayed afloat during a period of martial law. Reagan deployed the CIA's Special Activities Division to Afghanistan and Pakistan, and the CIA was instrumental in training, equipping, and leading Mujahideen forces against the Soviet Army in the Soviet–Afghan War. By 1987, the United States was sending over $600 million a year, as well as weapons, intelligence, and combat expertise to Afghanistan. The Soviet Union announced it would withdraw from Afghanistan in 1987, but the U.S. was subjected to blowback in the form of the Taliban and al-Qaeda, two groups that arose out of the Mujahideen and that would oppose the United States in future conflicts.

Although leading conservatives argued that Reagan's foreign policy strategy was essential to protecting their security interests, critics labeled the initiatives as aggressive and imperialistic, and chided them as "warmongering". Reagan was also heavily criticized for backing anti-communist leaders accused of severe human rights violations, such as Hissène Habré and Efraín Ríos Montt. Montt was the president of Guatemala and the Guatemalan military was accused of genocide for massacres of members of the Ixil people and other indigenous groups. Reagan had said that Montt was getting a "bum rap", and described him as "a man of great personal integrity". Previous human rights violations had prompted the United States to cut off aid to the Guatemalan government, but the Reagan administration unsuccessfully appealed to Congress to restart military aid. However, the administration successfully provided nonmilitary assistance such as the United States Agency for International Development.

=== Central America and the Caribbean ===
Reagan meets with Prime Minister Eugenia Charles of Dominica in the Oval Office about ongoing events in Grenada

The Reagan administration placed a high priority on the Central America and the Caribbean Sea, which it saw as a key front in the Cold War. Reagan and his foreign policy team were particularly concerned about the potential influence of Cuba on countries such as Grenada, Nicaragua, and El Salvador. To counter the influence of Cuba and the Soviet Union, Reagan launched the Caribbean Basin Initiative, an economic program designed to aid countries opposed to Communism. He also authorized covert measures, such as the arming of Nicaragua's Contras, to minimize Cuban and Soviet influence in the region. The administration provided support to right-wing governments throughout Latin America, disregarding humans rights abuses in countries like Argentina and El Salvador.

==== Invasion of Grenada ====
Tensions rose between the left-wing Grenadan government of Maurice Bishop and the U.S. because Cuban construction workers were building an airfield on the island. On October 16, 1983, pro-Communist forces of Hudson Austin led a coup against Bishop, who was subsequently arrested and executed. Reagan dispatched approximately 5,000 U.S. soldiers to invade Grenada nine days after. After two days of fighting that resulted in the deaths of 19 Americans, 45 Grenadans, and 24 Cubans, Austin's government was overthrown. Reagan then declared, "Our days of weakness are over. Our military forces are back on their feet and standing tall." While the invasion enjoyed public support in the United States and Grenada, it was criticized by the United Kingdom, Canada and the United Nations General Assembly as "a flagrant violation of international law".

=== Iran–Contra affair ===
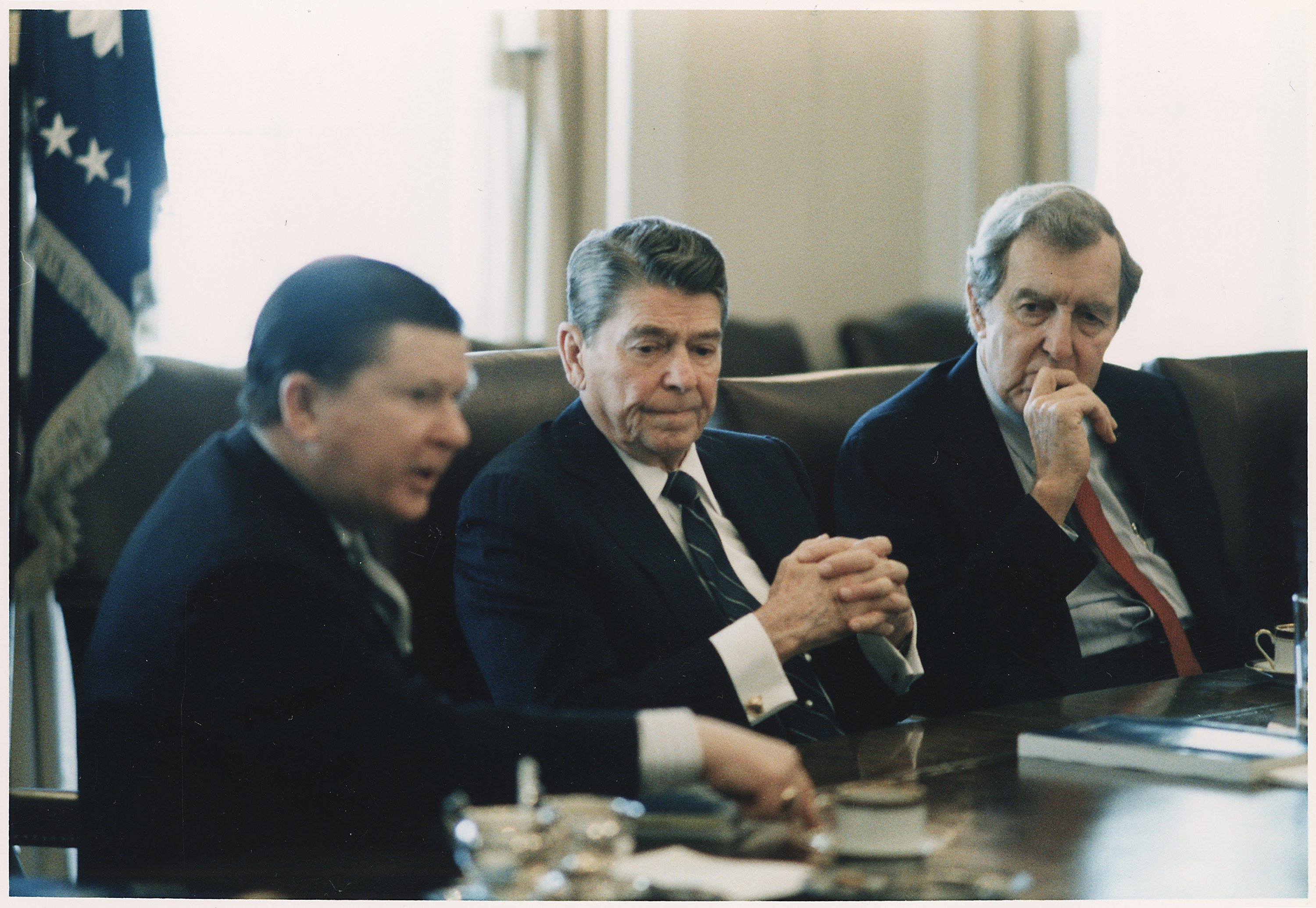
Reagan receiving the Tower Commission on the Iran–Contra affair, 1987

In 1979, a group of left-wing rebels in Nicaragua known as the Sandinistas overthrew the president of Nicaragua and installed Daniel Ortega as the country's leader. Fearing that Communists would take over Nicaragua if it remained under the leadership of the Sandinistas, the Reagan administration authorized CIA Director William J. Casey to arm the right-wing Contras. Congress, which favored negotiations between the Contras and Sandinista, passed the 1982 Boland Amendment, prohibiting the CIA and Defense Department from using their budgets to provide aid to the Contras. Still intent on supporting the Contras, the Reagan administration raised funds for the Contras from private donors and foreign governments. When Congress learned that the CIA had secretly placed naval mines in Nicaraguan harbors, Congress passed a second Boland Amendment that barred granting any assistance to the Contras.

During his second term, Reagan sought to find a way procure the release of seven American hostages held by Hezbollah, a Lebanese paramilitary group supported by Iran. The Reagan administration decided to sell American arms to Iran, then engaged in the Iran–Iraq War, in hopes that Iran would pressure Hezbollah to release the hostages. Secretary of Defense Weinberger and Secretary of State Shultz both opposed the arrangement, so it was handled by National Security Advisor Robert McFarlane and McFarlane's successor, John Poindexter. The Reagan administration sold over 2000 missiles to Iran without informing Congress; Hezbollah released four hostages but captured an additional six Americans. On the initiative of Oliver North, an aide on the National Security Council, the Reagan administration redirected the proceeds from the missile sales to the Contras. The transactions became public knowledge by early November 1986. Reagan initially denied any wrongdoing, but on November 25 he announced that Poindexter and North had left the administration and that he would form the Tower Commission to investigate the transactions. A few weeks later, Reagan asked a panel of federal judges to appoint a special prosecutor who would conduct a separate investigation, and the panel chose Lawrence Walsh.

The Tower Commission, chaired by former Republican senator John Tower, released a report in February 1987 that confirmed that the administration had traded arms for hostages and sent the proceeds of the weapons sales to the Contras. The report laid most of the blame for the operation on North, Poindexter, and McFarlane, but it was also critical of Regan and other White House staffers. In response to the Tower Commission report, Reagan stated, "Its findings are honest, convincing and highly critical...As angry as I may be about activities undertaken without my knowledge, I am still accountable for those activities." The Iran–Contra scandal, as it became known, did serious damage to the Reagan presidency, raising questions about Reagan's competency and the wisdom of conservative policies. A poll taken in March 1987 showed that 85 percent of respondents believed that the Reagan administration had engaged in an organized cover-up, and half of the respondents believed that Reagan had been personally involved. The administration's credibility was also badly damaged on the international stage, as it had violated its own arms embargo on Iran. Congressional Democrats considered impeaching, but decided that it would be an unwise use of political capital against a weakened president; Democrats were also somewhat mollified by Reagan's decision to replace Chief of Staff Regan with Howard Baker.

The investigations into the Iran–Contra scandal continued after Reagan left office, but were effectively halted when President George H. W. Bush pardoned Secretary of Defense Caspar Weinberger before his trial began. Investigators did not find conclusive proof that Reagan had known about the aid provided to the Contras, but Walsh's report noted that Reagan had "created the conditions which made possible the crimes committed by others" and had "knowingly participated or acquiesced in covering up the scandal".

=== End of the Cold War ===
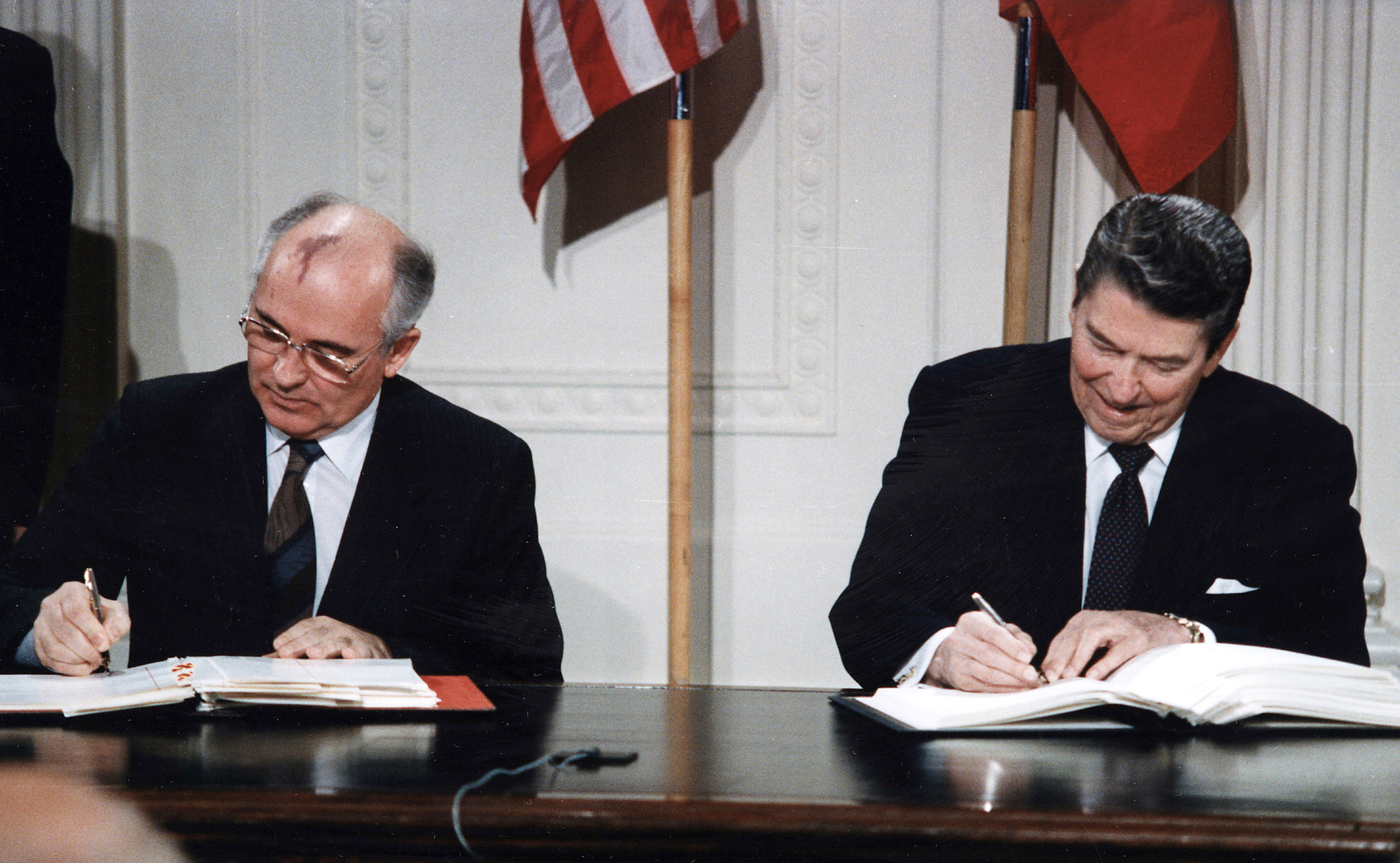
Gorbachev and Reagan sign the INF Treaty at the White House, 1987

Three different Soviet leaders died between 1982 and 1985, leaving the Soviets with an unstable leadership until Mikhail Gorbachev came to power in 1985. Although the Soviet Union had not accelerated military spending during Reagan's military buildup, their large military expenses, in combination with collectivized agriculture and inefficient planned manufacturing, were a heavy burden for the Soviet economy. Gorbachev was less ideologically rigid than his predecessors, and he believed that the Soviet Union urgently needed economic and political reforms. In 1986, he introduced his twin reforms of perestroika and glasnost, which would change the political and economic conditions of the Soviet Union. Seeking to reduce military expenditures and minimize the possibility of nuclear war, he also sought to re-open negotiations with the United States over arms control.

As his influence on domestic affairs waned during his second term, Reagan increasingly focused on relations with the Soviet Union. Reagan recognized the change in the direction of the Soviet leadership under Gorbachev, and shifted to diplomacy, with a view to encourage the Soviet leader to pursue substantial arms agreements. Reagan's personal mission was to achieve a world free of nuclear weapons, which according to Jack F. Matlock Jr., Reagan's ambassador to Moscow, he regarded as "totally irrational, totally inhumane, good for nothing but killing, possibly destructive of life on earth and civilization". Gorbachev and Reagan agreed to meet at the 1985 Geneva Summit, where they issued a joint statement indicating that neither the U.S. nor the Soviet Union would "seek to achieve military superiority". The two leaders began a private correspondence after the summit, and each became increasingly optimistic about arms control negotiations. Reagan's willingness to negotiate with the Soviets was opposed by many conservatives, including Weinberger; conservative columnist George Will wrote that Reagan was "elevating wishful thinking to the status of a political philosophy".

Various issues, including intelligence operations performed by both countries and tensions in Germany and Afghanistan, threatened to forestall the possibility of an agreement between the United States and the Soviet Union. Nonetheless, both Gorbachev and Reagan agreed to continue arms control negotiations at the October 1986 Reykjavík Summit. At the summit, Gorbachev and Reagan closed in on an agreement to greatly reduce or eliminate the nuclear stockpiles of both the U.S. and the Soviet Union over a ten-year period, but the deal collapsed due to disagreements regarding SDI development. Reagan attacked Gorbachev in a 1987 speech delivered in West Berlin, but negotiations continued. Gorbachev and Reagan broke the impasse by agreeing to negotiate separate treaties on intermediate nuclear forces (such as intermediate-range ballistic missiles) and strategic arms (such as intercontinental ballistic missiles).

With the framework for an agreement in place, Reagan and Gorbachev met at the 1987 Washington Summit. They signed the Intermediate-Range Nuclear Forces Treaty (INF Treaty), which committed both signatories to the total abolition of their respective short-range and medium-range missile stockpiles. The agreement marked the first time that the United States and the Soviet Union had committed to the elimination of a type of nuclear weapon, though it provided for the dismantlement of only about one-twentieth of the worldwide nuclear weapon arsenal. The treaty also established an inspections regime designed to ensure that both parties honored the agreement. In addition to the INF Treaty, Reagan and Gorbachev discussed a potential strategic arms treaty, known as START, but SDI continued to be a major point of contention. In May 1988, the Senate voted 93-to-5 in favor of ratifying the INF Treaty.

President Reagan's Trip to USSR, Walking in Red Square with Mikhail Gorbachev, Moscow, May 31, 1988

Though it was attacked by conservatives like Jesse Helms, the INF Treaty provided a major boost to Reagan's popularity in the aftermath of the Iran–Contra Affair. A new era of trade and openness between the two powers commenced, and the U.S. and the Soviet Union cooperated on international issues such as the Iran–Iraq War. When Reagan visited Moscow for a fourth summit with Gorbachev in 1988, he was viewed as a celebrity by the Soviets. A journalist asked the president if he still considered the Soviet Union the evil empire. "No," he replied, "I was talking about another time, another era." At Gorbachev's request, Reagan gave a speech on free markets at the Moscow State University. In December 1988, Gorbachev effectively renounced the Brezhnev Doctrine, paving the way for democratization in Eastern Europe. In November 1989, ten months after Reagan left office, the Berlin Wall fell. The Cold War was unofficially declared over at the Malta Summit the following month.

=== Honoring German war dead at Bitburg, Germany ===
Reagan came under much criticism in 1985 when he was accused of honoring Nazi war criminals at a cemetery in West Germany. In February 1985, the administration accepted an invitation for Reagan to visit a German military cemetery in Bitburg and to place a wreath alongside West German chancellor Helmut Kohl. Deaver was given assurances by a German head of protocol that no war criminals were buried there. It was later determined that the cemetery held the graves of 49 members of the Waffen-SS. What neither Deaver nor other administration officials initially realized was that many Germans distinguished the regular SS, who typically were composed of Nazi true believers, and the Waffen-SS which were attached to military units and composed of conscripted soldiers.

As the controversy brewed in April 1985, Reagan issued a statement that called the Nazi soldiers buried in that cemetery as themselves "victims", a designation which ignited a stir over whether Reagan had equated the SS men to victims of the Holocaust. Pat Buchanan, Reagan's director of communications, argued that the president did not equate the SS members with the actual Holocaust, but as victims of the ideology of Nazism. Now strongly urged to cancel the visit, the president responded that it would be wrong to back down on a promise he had made to Chancellor Kohl. On May 5, 1985, President Reagan and Chancellor Kohl first visited the site of the former Nazi Bergen-Belsen concentration camp and then the Bitburg cemetery where, along with two military generals, they did place a wreath.

=== Middle East ===
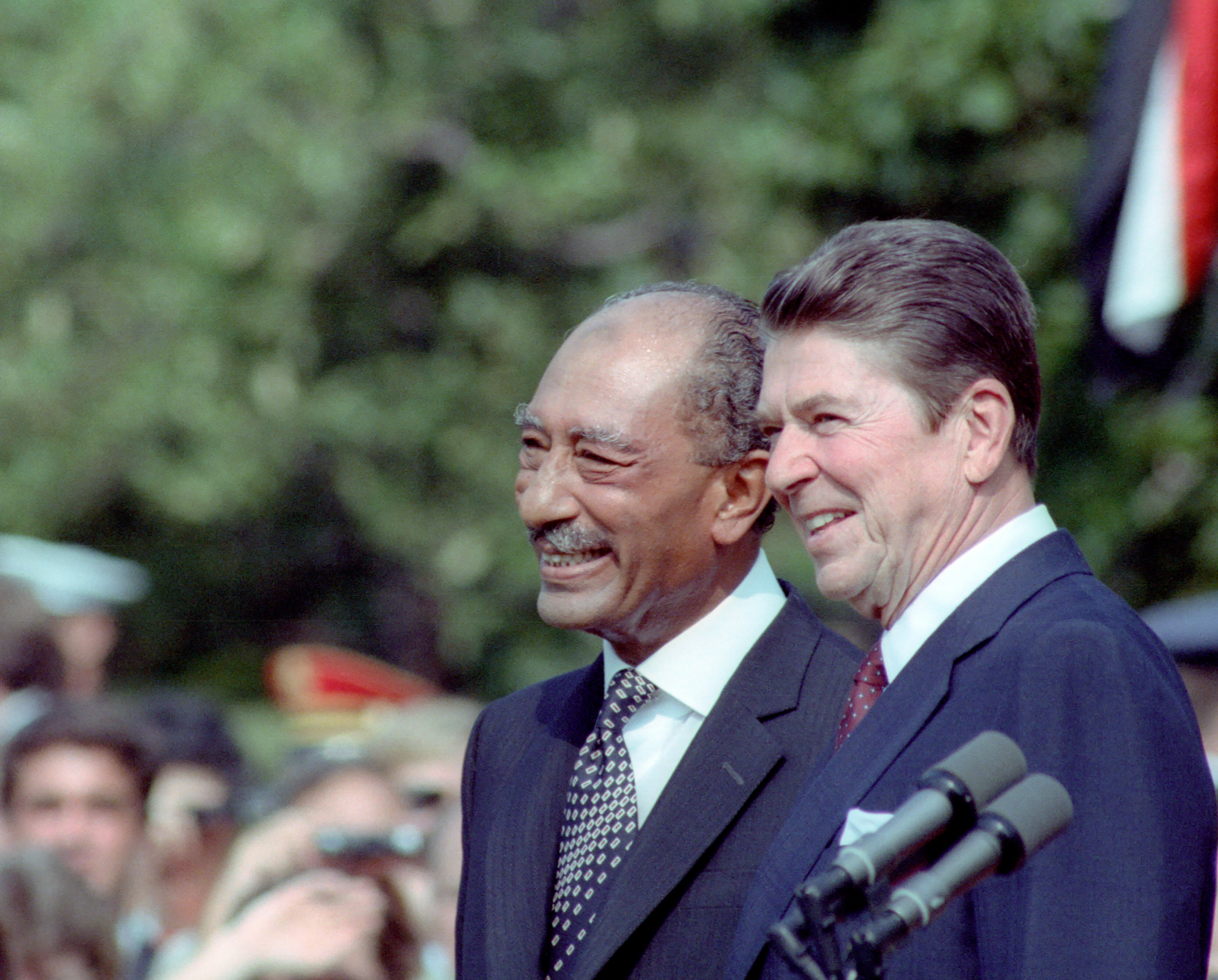
Egyptian president Anwar Sadat with Reagan in a joint press conference at the White House, 1981

==== Lebanon ====
A civil war had broken out in Lebanon in 1975, and both Israel and Syria undertook military action within Lebanon in 1982. After Israel invaded Southern Lebanon, Reagan faced domestic and international pressure to oppose the Israeli invasion, but Reagan was reluctant to openly break Israel. Reagan sympathized with Israeli's desire to defeat PLO forces that had struck Israel from Lebanon, but he pressured Israel to end its invasion as casualties mounted and Israeli forces approached the Lebanese capital of Beirut. American diplomat Philip Habib arranged a cease-fire in which Israel, Syria, and the PLO, all agreed to evacuate their forces from Lebanon. As Israel delayed a full withdrawal and violence continued in Lebanon, Reagan arranged for a multinational force, including U.S. Marines, to serve as peacekeepers in Lebanon. In October 1983, two nearly-simultaneous bombings in Beirut killed 241 American Marines and 58 French soldiers. The international peacekeeping force was withdrawn from Lebanon in 1984. In reaction to the role Israel and the United States played in the Lebanese Civil War, a Shia militant group known as Hezbollah began to take American hostages, holding eight Americans by the middle of 1985. The Reagan administration's attempts to release these hostages would be a major component of the Iran-Contra Scandal. In response to the U.S. intervention in Lebanon, the Defense Department developed the "Powell Doctrine", which stated that the U.S. should intervene militarily as a last resort and should set clear and limited goals in such interventions. Though termed the Powell doctrine, the policy was originally developed by Secretary of Defense Weinberger, who was influenced not only by Lebanon but also by the experience of the Vietnam War.

==== Libya bombing ====
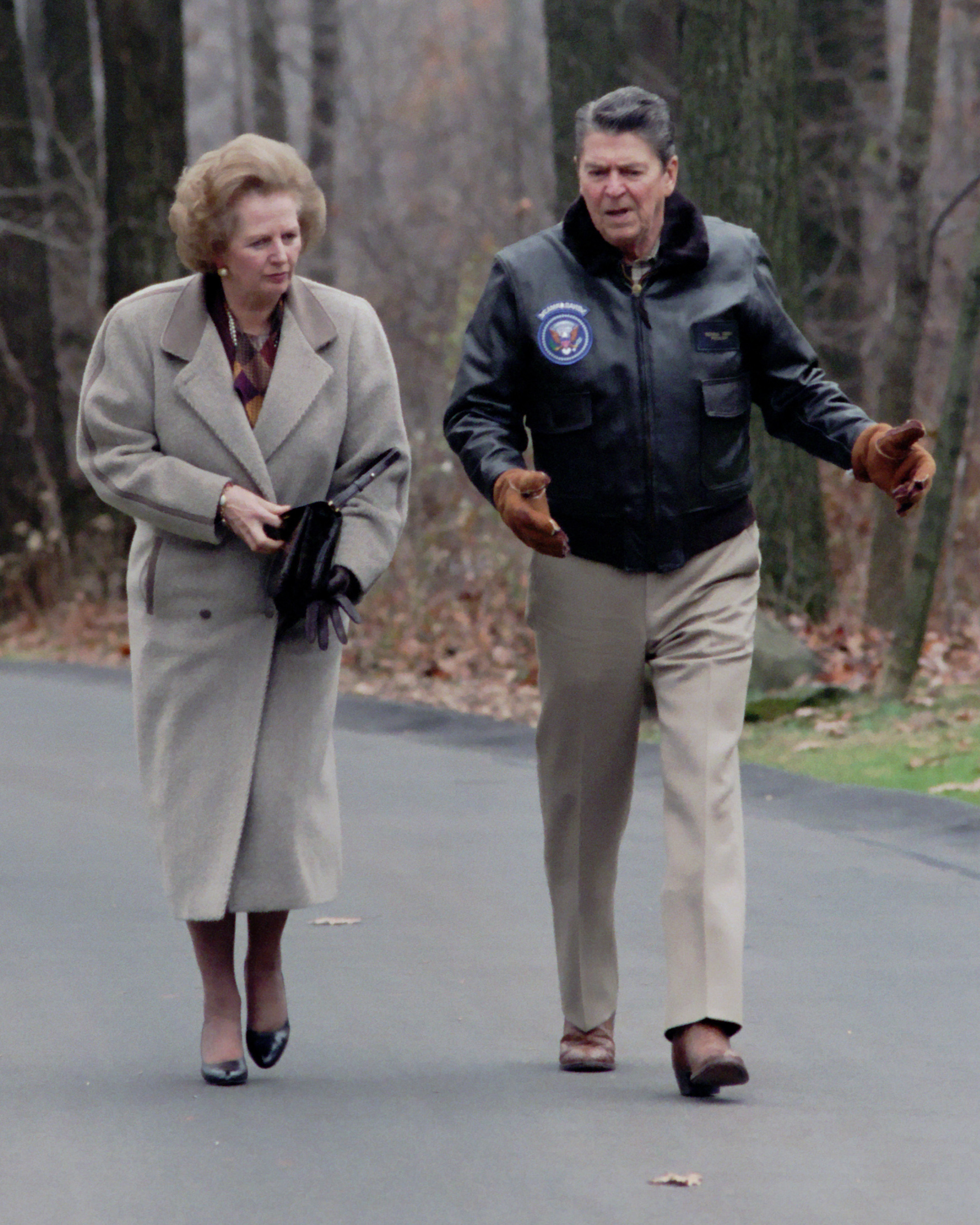
British prime minister Margaret Thatcher (here walking with President Reagan at Camp David in 1986) granted the U.S. use of British airbases to launch the Libya attack

Relations between Libya and the United States under President Reagan were continually contentious, beginning with the Gulf of Sidra incident in 1981; by 1982, Libyan leader Muammar Gaddafi was considered by the CIA to be, along with USSR leader Leonid Brezhnev and Cuban leader Fidel Castro, part of a group known as the "unholy trinity" and was also labeled as "our international public enemy number one" by a CIA official. These tensions were later revived in early April 1986, when a bomb exploded in a West Berlin discothèque, resulting in the injury of 63 American military personnel and death of one serviceman. Stating that there was irrefutable proof that Libya had directed the terrorist bombing, Reagan authorized the use of force against the country. In the late evening of April 15, 1986, the United States launched a series of airstrikes on ground targets in Libya.

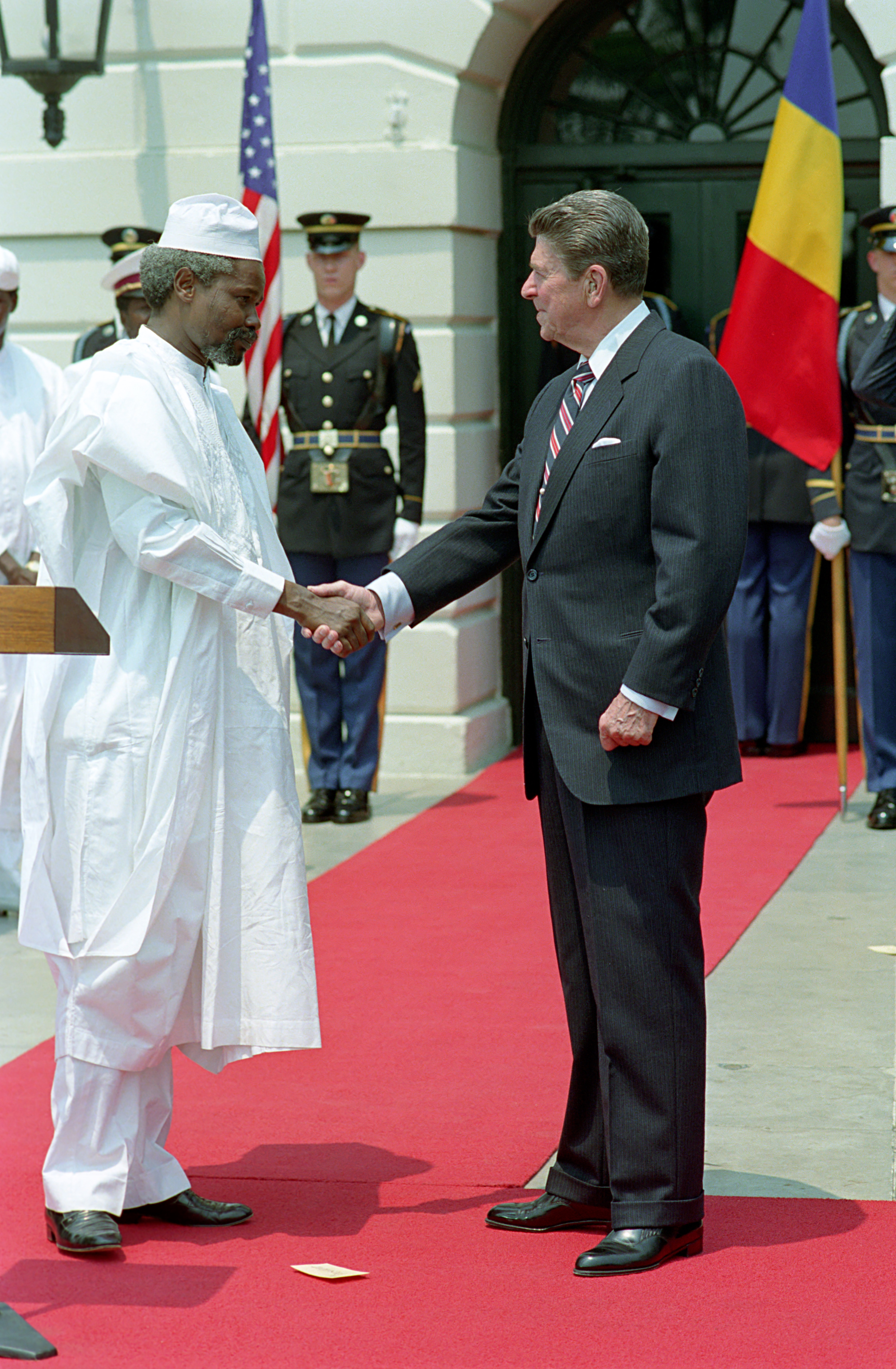
Chadian president Hissène Habré at the White House. Habré was supported by the Reagan administration as an ally against Gaddafi's Libya

Britain's prime minister, Margaret Thatcher, allowed the U.S. Air Force to use Britain's air bases to launch the attack, on the justification that the UK was supporting America's right to self-defense under Article 51 of the United Nations Charter. The attack was designed to halt Gaddafi's "ability to export terrorism", offering him "incentives and reasons to alter his criminal behavior". The president addressed the nation from the Oval Office after the attacks had commenced, stating, "When our citizens are attacked or abused anywhere in the world on the direct orders of hostile regimes, we will respond so long as I'm in this office." The attack was condemned by many countries. By a vote of 79 in favor to 28 against with 33 abstentions, the United Nations General Assembly adopted resolution 41/38 which "condemns the military attack perpetrated against the Socialist People's Libyan Arab Jamahiriya on April 15, 1986, which constitutes a violation of the Charter of the United Nations and of international law".

=== South Africa ===
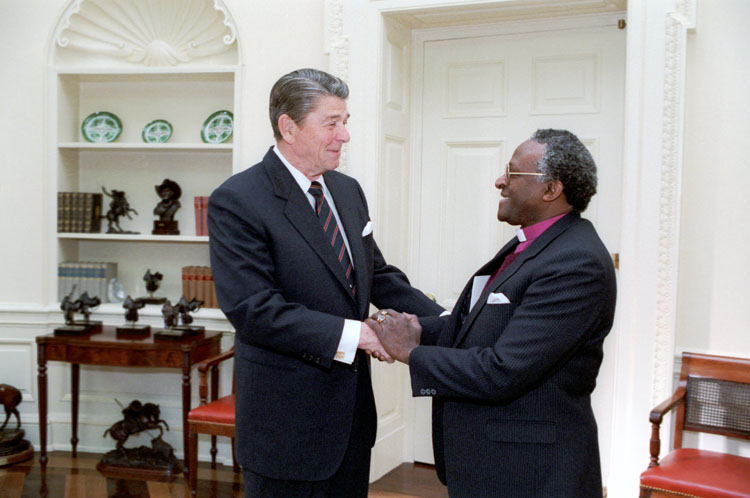
President Reagan meeting with South African anti-apartheid activist Desmond Tutu in 1984

During Ronald Reagan's presidency South Africa continued to use a non-democratic system of government based on racial discrimination, known as apartheid, in which the minority of white South Africans exerted nearly complete legal control over the lives of the non-white majority of the citizens. In the early 1980s the issue had moved to the center of international attention as a result of events in the townships and outcry at the death of Stephen Biko. Reagan administration policy called for "constructive engagement" with the apartheid government of South Africa. In opposition to the condemnations issued by the U.S. Congress and public demands for diplomatic or economic sanctions, Reagan made relatively minor criticisms of the regime, which was otherwise internationally isolated, and the U.S. granted recognition to the government. South Africa's military was then engaged in an occupation of Namibia and proxy wars in several neighboring countries, in alliance with Savimbi's UNITA. Reagan administration officials saw the apartheid government as a key anti-communist ally.

Finding the Reagan Administration unresponsive to its calls for more stringent economic sanctions, anti-apartheid activists undertook a divestment campaign, aimed at moving individuals and institutions to sell their holdings in companies doing business in South Africa. By late 1985, facing escalating public and congressional opposition to his administration's tolerant attitude toward the South African government's policy of apartheid, Reagan made an "abrupt reversal" on the issue and proposed sanctions on the South African government, including an arms embargo. However, these sanctions were seen as weak by anti-apartheid activists, and as insufficient by the president's opponents in Congress, including 81 House Republicans. In August 1986, Congress approved the Comprehensive Anti-Apartheid Act, which included tougher sanctions. Reagan vetoed the act, but this was overridden by a bipartisan effort in Congress. By 1990, under Reagan's successor George H. W. Bush, the new South African government of F. W. de Klerk was introducing widespread reforms, though the Bush administration argued that this was not a result of the tougher sanctions.

=== Free trade ===
During his 1980 presidential campaign, Reagan proposed the creation of a common market in North America. Once in office, Reagan signed the Trade and Tariff Act of 1984, which granted the president "fast track" authority in negotiating free trade agreements. In 1985, Reagan signed the Israel–United States Free Trade Agreement, the first bilateral free trade agreement in U.S. history. In 1988, Reagan and Canadian prime minister Brian Mulroney signed the Canada–United States Free Trade Agreement, which greatly reduced trade barriers between the United States and Canada. This trade pact would serve as the foundation for the North American Free Trade Agreement among the United States, Canada, and Mexico.

== Age and health ==
At the time, Reagan was the oldest person to have served as U.S. president. Reagan's health became a concern at times during his presidency.

Early in his presidency, Reagan started wearing a custom-made, technologically advanced hearing aid, first in his right ear and later in his left ear as well. His decision to go public in 1983 regarding his wearing the small, audio-amplifying device boosted their sales.

On July 13, 1985, Reagan underwent surgery to remove 2 feet of the upper section of his colon due to a cancer tumor in his cecum. He relinquished presidential power to the vice president for eight hours in a similar procedure as outlined in the 25th Amendment, which he specifically avoided invoking. The surgery lasted just under three hours and was successful. Reagan resumed the powers of the presidency later that day. In August of that year, he underwent an operation to remove skin cancer cells from his nose. In October, more skin cancer cells were detected on his nose and removed.

Former White House correspondent Lesley Stahl later wrote that in 1986, she and other reporters noticed what might have been early symptoms of Reagan's later Alzheimer's disease. She said that on her last day on the beat, Reagan spoke to her for a few moments and did not seem to know who she was before returning to his normal behavior. However, Reagan's primary physician, John Hutton, has said that Reagan "absolutely" did not "show any signs of dementia or Alzheimer's" during his presidency. His doctors have noted that he began exhibiting Alzheimer's symptoms only after he left the White House.

In January 1987, Reagan underwent surgery for an enlarged prostate that caused further worries about his health. No cancerous growths were found, and he was not sedated during the operation. In July of that year, he underwent a third skin cancer operation on his nose.

On January 7, 1989, Reagan underwent surgery to repair a Dupuytren's contracture of the ring finger of his left hand.

== Elections during the Reagan presidency ==
Congressional party leaders
		Senate leaders		House leaders	
Congress	Year	Majority	Minority	Speaker	Minority
97th	1981–1982	Baker	Byrd	O'Neill	Michel
98th	1983–1984	Baker	Byrd	O'Neill	Michel
99th	1985–1986	Dole	Byrd	O'Neill	Michel
100th	1987–1988	Byrd	Dole	Wright	Michel
101st (Note: 17 days of the 97th Congress (January 3, 1981 – January 19, 1981) took place under President Carter, and 17 days of the 101st Congress (January 3, 1989 – January 19, 1989) took place during Reagan's second term.)	1989	Mitchell	Dole	Wright	Michel

Republican seats in Congress
Congress	Senate	House
97th	53–54	192
98th	54–55	166
99th	53	182
100th	45–46	177
101st	45	175

=== 1982 mid-term elections ===
In the 1982 mid-term elections, Democrats retained a majority of the House while Republicans retained control of the Senate. Democratic gains in the House put a check on Reagan's policies, as the incoming Congress was significantly less open to Reagan's conservative policies. Despite the Democratic electoral gains, the election represented the first time since the 1930 elections that the Republican Party successfully defended a majority in either chamber of Congress.

=== 1984 re-election campaign ===
President Reagan defeated Democrat Walter Mondale in the 1984 presidential election. President Reagan was reelected in one of the largest landslide election victories in American history, winning 59% of the popular vote, receiving 54,455,472 votes to Mondale's 37,577,352 votes. President Reagan won an even larger Electoral College victory, winning 525 electoral votes to 13 for Mondale.

Reagan's approval ratings fell after his first year in office, but they bounced back when the United States began to emerge from recession in 1983. The leading candidates in the 1984 Democratic presidential primaries were former vice president Walter Mondale, Senator Gary Hart of Colorado, and African-American civil rights activist Jesse Jackson. Though Hart won several primaries, Mondale ultimately won the nomination. Down in the polls, Mondale selected Congresswoman Geraldine Ferraro as his running mate in hopes of galvanizing support for his campaign, thus making Ferraro the first female major party vice presidential nominee in U.S. history. In accepting the Democratic nomination, Mondale attacked Reagan's policies regarding the environment, Social Security, nuclear arms, civil rights, and other issues, stating that the Reagan administration was "of the rich, by the rich, and for the rich". He also criticized the federal debt accumulated under Reagan, stating, "...The budget will be squeezed. Taxes will go up. And anyone who says they won't is not telling the truth to the American people."

Reagan, meanwhile, generally declined to offer new legislative proposals for his re-election campaign, instead focusing on events like the U.S.-hosted 1984 Summer Olympics and the 40th anniversary of the Normandy landings. Reagan's ability to perform the duties of president for another term was questioned by some observers, especially after a weak performance in the first presidential debate. His apparent confused and forgetful behavior was evident to his supporters; they had previously known him clever and witty. Rumors began to circulate that he had Alzheimer's disease. Reagan rebounded in the second debate, and confronted questions about his age, quipping, "I will not make age an issue of this campaign. I am not going to exploit, for political purposes, my opponent's youth and inexperience," which generated applause and laughter, even from Mondale himself.

Public opinion polling consistently showed a Reagan lead in the 1984 campaign, and Mondale was unable to shake up the race. In the end, Reagan won re-election, winning 49 of 50 states. Mondale carried only his home state of Minnesota and the District of Columbia. Reagan won a record 525 electoral votes, and received 59% of the popular vote to Mondale's 41%. Compared to 1980, Reagan's strongest gains came among white Southern voters, and he also performed particularly well among Catholic voters, voters between the ages of eighteen and twenty-nine, and voters over the age of sixty. In the concurrent congressional elections, Republicans retained control of the Senate and Democrats retained control of the House of Representatives.

=== 1986 mid-term elections ===
In the 1986 mid-term elections, Democrats retained a majority of the House and won control of the Senate for the first time since the 1980 elections. Reagan campaigned hard for congressional Republicans, and an October 1986 New York Times/CBS News Poll had found that Reagan had a 67% approval rating. However, Senate Republicans faced a difficult map that year, as they had to defend 22 of the 34 seats up for election. Republican losses in the Senate were concentrated in the South and in the farm states. The Republican loss of the Senate precluded the possibility of further major conservative legislation during the Reagan administration.

=== 1988 elections and transition period ===
Republican George H. W. Bush defeated Democrat Michael Dukakis in the 1988 presidential election.

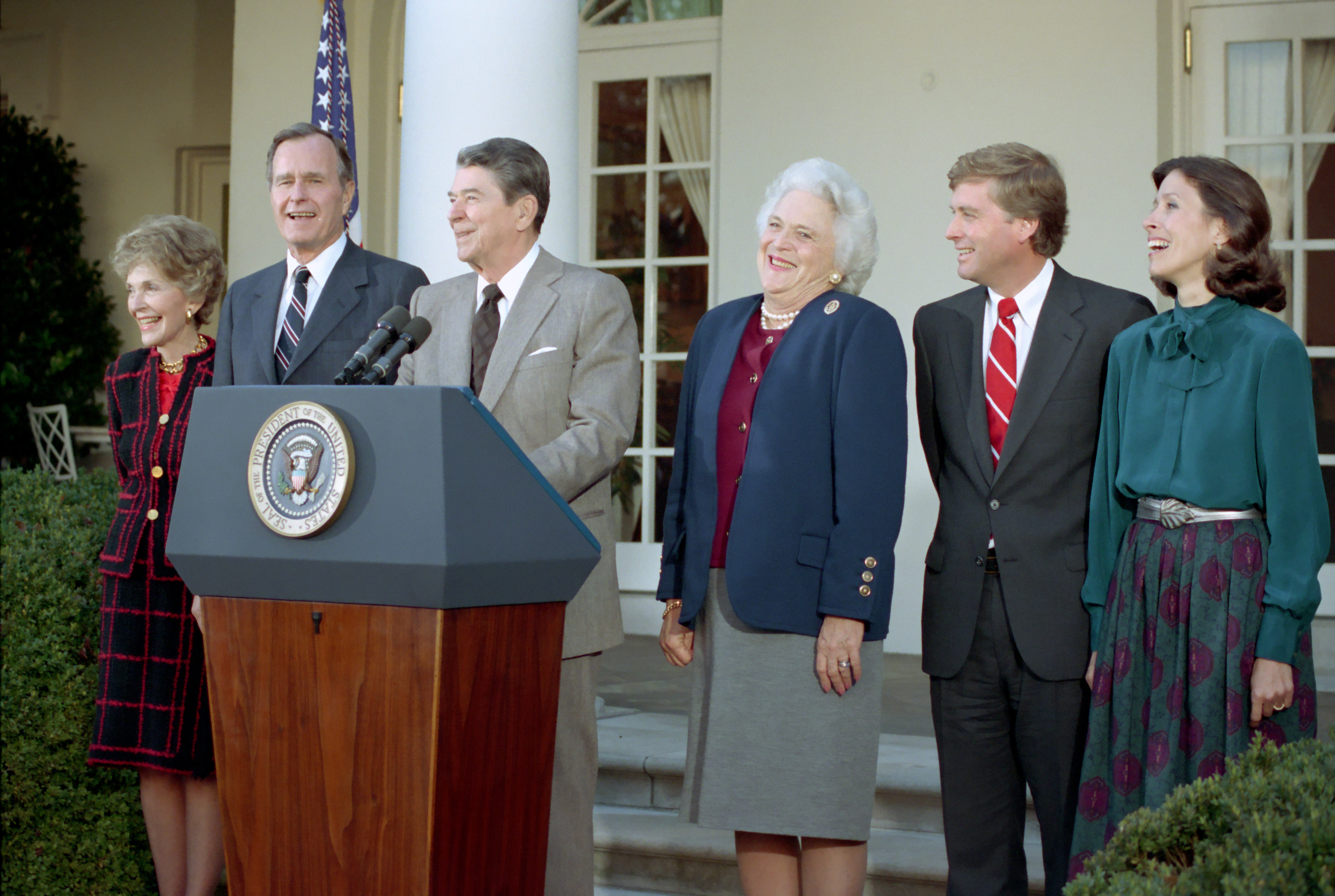
Outgoing president Ronald Reagan with his wife Nancy, vice president and president-elect George H. W. Bush with his wife Barbara, and vice president-elect Dan Quayle with his wife Marilyn in the White House Rose Garden on November 9, 1988

Reagan remained publicly neutral in the 1988 Republican presidential primaries, but privately supported Vice President George H. W. Bush over Senator Bob Dole. The 1988 Republican National Convention, which nominated Bush for president, also acted as a celebration of Reagan's presidency. Democrats nominated Michael Dukakis, the liberal Governor of Massachusetts. Following the 1988 Democratic National Convention, Dukakis led the polls by seventeen points, but Bush, aided by the INF Treaty and the strong economy, closed the gap as the election neared. Democrats tried to link Bush to the Iran–Contra Scandal, but Bush claimed that he had not been involved. The GOP effectively cast Dukakis as "soft" on crime and foreign policy issues, seizing on Dukakis's pardon of Willie Horton and his dispassionate response to a question regarding the death penalty.

In the 1988 presidential election, Bush soundly defeated Dukakis, taking 53.4 percent of the popular vote and 426 electoral votes. The election saw the lowest turnout of eligible voters in any presidential election since 1948. In the concurrent congressional elections, Democrats retained control of the House of Representatives and the Senate. In large part due to his handling of relations with the Soviet Union, Reagan left office with an approval rating of sixty-eight percent, matching the approval ratings of Franklin Roosevelt and later Bill Clinton as the highest rating for a departing president in the modern era.

== Evaluation and legacy ==
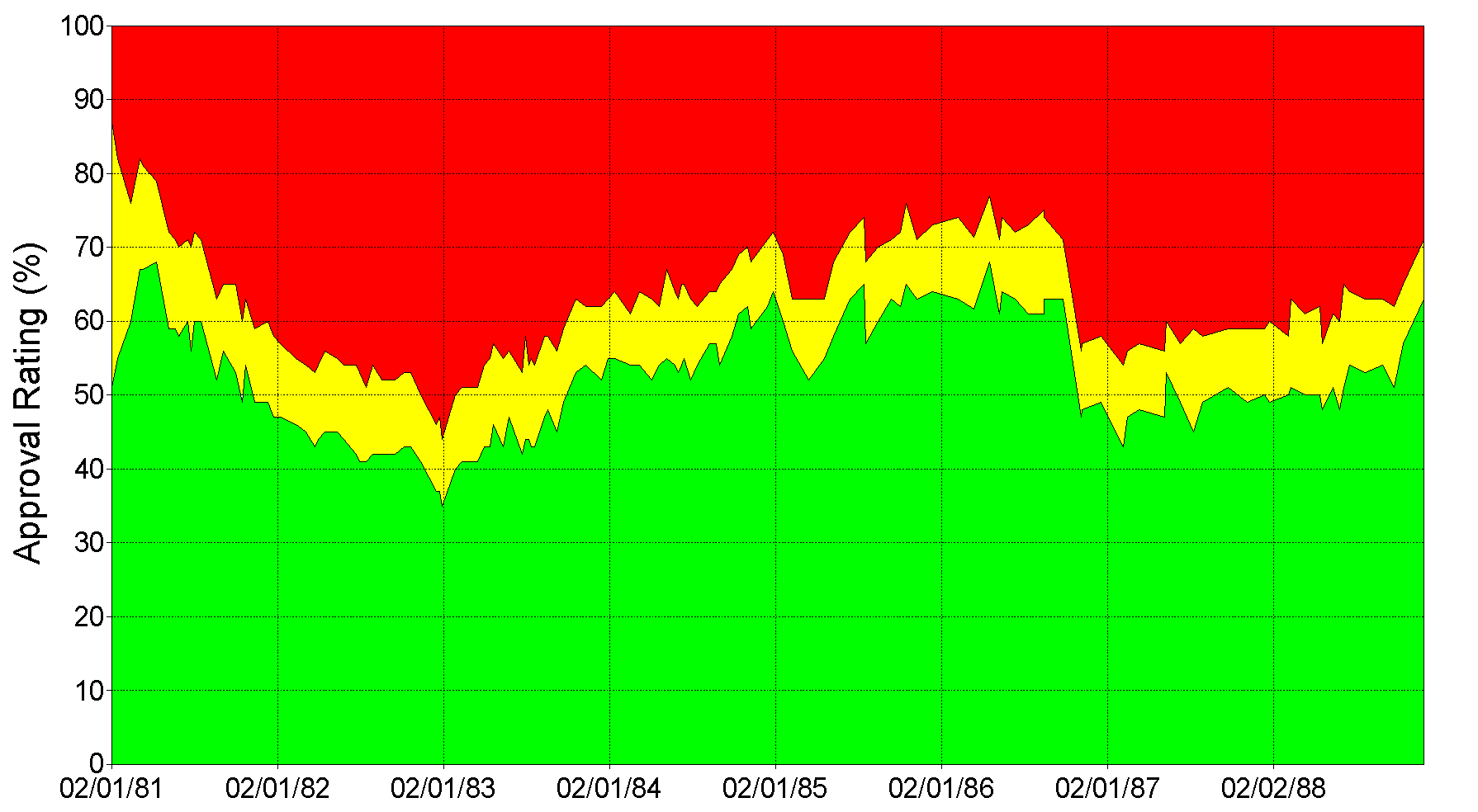
Graph of Reagan's approval ratings in Gallup polls

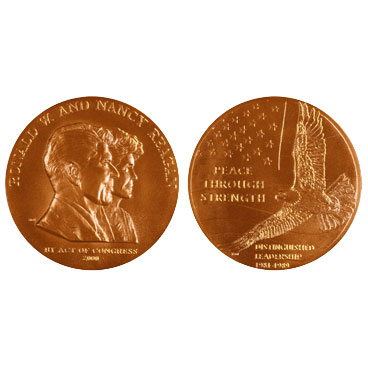
Reagan congressional medal

Since Reagan left office in 1989, substantial debate has occurred among scholars, historians, and the general public surrounding his legacy. Supporters have pointed to a more efficient and prosperous economy as a result of Reagan's economic policies, foreign policy triumphs including a peaceful end to the Cold War, and a restoration of American pride and morale. Proponents also argue Reagan restored faith in the American Dream after a decline in American confidence and self-respect under Jimmy Carter's perceived weak leadership, particularly during the Iran hostage crisis. Reagan remains an important symbol of American conservatism, much in the same way that Franklin Roosevelt continued to serve as a symbol of liberalism long after his own death.

Critics contend that Reagan's economic policies resulted in rising budget deficits, a wider gap in wealth, and an increase in homelessness. Liberals especially disapproved of Reagan's simultaneous tax cuts for the wealthy and benefit cuts for the poor. Some critics assert that the Iran–Contra affair lowered American credibility. In his popular book, The Rise and Fall of the Great Powers, historian Paul Kennedy argued that Reagan's high level of defense would eventually lead to the decline of the United States as a great power. Reagan's leadership and understanding of issues has also been questioned, and even some members of the administration criticized Reagan's passive demeanor during meetings with staff and cabinet members. Richard Pipes, a member of the National Security Council, criticized Reagan as "really lost, out of his depth, uncomfortable" at NSC meetings. Another NSC member, Colin Powell, criticized Reagan's "passive management style [that] placed a tremendous burden on us".

Despite the continuing debate surrounding his legacy, many conservative and liberal scholars agree that Reagan has been one of the most influential presidents since Franklin Roosevelt, leaving his imprint on American politics, diplomacy, culture, and economics through his effective communication, dedicated patriotism, and pragmatic compromising. Since he left office, historians have reached a consensus, as summarized by British historian M. J. Heale, who finds that scholars now concur that Reagan rehabilitated conservatism, turned the nation to the right, practiced a considerably pragmatic conservatism that balanced ideology and the constraints of politics, revived faith in the presidency and in American exceptionalism, and contributed to victory in the Cold War. Hugh Heclo argues that Reagan himself failed to roll back the welfare state, but that he contributed to a shift in attitudes that led to the defeat of efforts to further expand the welfare state. Heclo further argues that Reagan's presidency made American voters and political leaders more tolerant of deficits and more opposed to taxation.

In 2011 a public opinion survey by Gallup found Reagan was the top-ranked President, even beating out Lincoln. In 2017, a C-SPAN survey of scholars ranked Reagan as the ninth greatest president. A 2018 poll of the American Political Science Association's presidents and Executive Politics section also ranked Reagan as the ninth greatest president. In terms of the worst mistake made by a sitting president, a 2006 poll of historians ranked the Iran-Contra affair as the ninth worst.

== See also ==
- History of the United States (1980–1991)
- Premiership of Margaret Thatcher
- First premiership of Mahathir Mohamad
- Ronald Reagan Presidential Library, Simi Valley, California
