= NPPL (disambiguation) =

NPPL is the UK National Private Pilot Licence.

NPPL may also refer to:

- National Professional Paintball League, a former Speedball (paintball) league
- NPPL Championship Paintball 2009, a video game
