= Ryan Greenspan =

American Professional Paintball player (born 1982)

Personal information
- Website: www.ryangreenspan.com

Sport
- Sport: Paintball
- Team: San Diego Dynasty

Ryan Greenspan (born February 25, 1982, Sebastopol, California, United States) is an American Professional Paintball player. Greenspan is a founding member of the professional paintball team San Diego Dynasty, and with that team has won more professional tournaments than any other team in the history of the sport. Greenspan resides in San Diego, California, which is the team’s current headquarters. Currently, Dynasty wears blue uniforms with a Japanese-styled blue dragon.

In 2010 Greenspan was awarded “Ambassador to the Sport” at the Australian Masters in Sydney, Australia.

== Early career ==
Greenspan, in his amateur days played on three teams, Outta Control, KAPP Factory, and his most notable team, the Ironkids with teammates Oliver Lang, Alex Fraige, and Yosh Rau. In 2000, at age 18, Greenspan and teammates Alex Fraige, Yosh Rau, Brian Cole, and Kenny Chaimberlan won the largest prize in paintball history at the time, five Ford Mustang cars, the prize purse was valued at over $85,000. This was the turning point in his career before going Pro.

At the end of the 2000 season, Greenspan went Pro and co-founded team San Diego Dynasty.

== Professional career ==
Greenspan currently competes in two major international leagues: The National X-Ball League (NXL, USA) “Race to” format, the Millennium Series (Europe) CPL Division. In addition to these major events, Greenspan also attends various individual events around the world such as the World Cup Asia (Malaysia) and the Super Sevens Masters (AUS). Greenspan has appeared in several All Star games and also represented the USA in the Nations Cup, in the European Millennium Series.

In 2011, Greenspan and San Diego Dynasty went on to surpass a historic 50 professional tournament victories, something that has never been done before.

== Television, video, and digital likeness ==
Table featuring feature films with Robin Williams
Year	Title	Role	Notes	Ref(s)
	Extreme Paintball: Beyond the Paint		TV series on Fox Sports Network	
2005	US Paintball Championships 2005		Broadcast on ESPN	
2006	Smart Parts: World Paintball Championships 2006		Broadcast on ESPN	
2011	NPPL's 2011 Huntington Beach Open		50th Tournament Victory for San Diego Dynasty, Webcast Live on ESPN360	
	Exposed (Dating Show)		Non-Paintball Role	
	Dynasty Dysected Volumes 1 and 2		Hosted, co-written, and co-produced by Greenspan	
	Cereal Killers 2 (Paintball video)		Produced by Monkey With A Gun	
NPPL Championship Paintball 2009 (Video Game)			Voice and Likeness in Game	
