= Greenspun =

Greenspun (Anglicized from Yiddish: גרינשפּון) is a surname. Notable people with the surname include:

- Hank Greenspun (1909–1989), American newspaper publisher, and founder of the Greenspun Corporation
- Philip Greenspun (born 1963), American computer scientist and entrepreneur
- Roger Greenspun (1929–2017), American journalist and film critic

== See also ==
- Greenspan
- Greenspoon
- Greenspun Media Group
- Greenspun's Tenth Rule
- The Greenspun Corporation
- Grinspun
- Grünspan
