= Greenspoon =

Greenspoon is a surname. Notable people with the surname include:

- Danny Greenspoon, Canadian music producer, music engineer, guitar player, and film composer
- Jimmy Greenspoon (1948–2015), American keyboardist and composer
- Joel Greenspoon (1920–2004), American psychology researcher, academic, and clinician

== See also ==
- Greenspun, Grinspun
- Greenspan
- Grünspan
