= Exposed (American game show) =

- Country of origin: United States

Production
- Running time: 22 minutes

Original release
- Network: MTV
- Release: January 2007 – 2008?

MTV's Exposed is a television dating show which ran on MTV. It debuted on January 1, 2007, and was produced by Kallissa Productions and Endemol USA, as a "successor" to the dating show Next. The show ended by 2008.

== Description ==
The premise of the show revolved around lie detection software. The initial dater and a friend introduce themselves, and the friend sits in a recreational vehicle (RV) where they can monitor the date. The date consists of the initial dater simultaneously asking questions of two potential mates, followed by a few individual questions to each of them during the "hot seat" portion of the date.

Everything said by the daters is run through lie detection software. Through an earpiece, the friend in the RV tells the dater if what one says is a lie or the truth. At the end of the date, the dater reveals that the statements made during the date have been run through lie detection software, usually to shocked reactions from the two contestants. Next, the dater asks the two contestants if there is anything they would like to 'come clean' about, giving them a last chance to reveal a lie. Commonly, both daters don't respond to this, though they know they have (usually) both lied.

Then, the dater goes back to the RV to consult with their friend and decide which of the two competitors to pick. The dater then returns and confronts the two daters, exposing one (or multiple, occasionally) of their most notable lies, before revealing which one they chose.

At the end of each episode, a disclaimer is shown that reads "The Voice Stress Analyzer is used for entertainment purposes only. It is not operated by a trained professional or under conditions that would provide a reliable means of lie detection. No representations are made regarding the accuracy of any results." Some believed the show to be fake, as contestants from the dating show "Next" also appeared on Exposed.

== Reception ==
The show did not attain critical acclaim, with one early review calling it an "abomination."

== Notable appearances ==
- Joey Paggi the winner of Season 4 (also runner up of Season 3) on Oxygen's Love Games appeared on MTV Exposed in August 2007 - Love Games: Bad Girls Need Love Too (season 4).
- Melissa Smith and Aubrey O'Day appeared in one episode.
- Marcus Foy and Billy Marquart, both from Oxygen's "Janice Dickinson's Modeling Agency", were each featured on one episode.
- Flavor of Love-contestant, Pumkin, has starred in one episode.
- R&B-singer Marques Houston appeared in one of the episodes with fellow IMx member Jerome Jones.
- America's Next Top Model, Cycle 4 contestant, Michelle Deighton, was featured in one episode.
- Latin pop singer Paula DeAnda has starred in one episode.
- Actor Jamie Kennedy has starred in one episode, taking home both dates.
- Football player Shawne Merriman appeared in one episode as the RV friend.
- All Time Low's bass player, Zack Merrick appeared in an episode.
- Clothing designer Brandon Holley of Your Mannequin Clothing and BranVille Clothing appeared in one episode.
- Ryan Sheckler appeared on one episode.
- Jessie Godderz from Big Brother 10 was a contestant on an episode.
- Pro paintball player Ryan Greenspan from San Diego Dynasty appeared in one episode.
