= Marshall Greenspan =

Marshall Greenspan from Northrop Grumman Electronic Systems, Fairfield, CT was named Fellow of the Institute of Electrical and Electronics Engineers (IEEE) in 2013 for contributions to design and development multi-channel radars.
