= Harvey P. Greenspan =

American mathematician (1933–2026)

H. P. Greenspan
- Born: February 22, 1933; New York City, U.S.
- Died: March 20, 2026 (aged 93)
- Education: City College of New York; Harvard University
- Known for: Fluid dynamics Magnetohydrodynamics; Centrifugal Separation
- Scientific career
- Fields: Applied Mathematics
- Workplaces: MIT; Harvard
- Doctoral advisor: G.F. Carrier
- Notable students: Joseph Pedlosky

Harvey P. Greenspan (February 22, 1933 – March 20, 2026) was an American mathematician and academic who was Professor emeritus at the Massachusetts Institute of Technology. He was notable for theoretical and experimental contributions in various subjects such as wave motion, oceanography, magneto-hydrodynamics, rotating fluids, bio-fluid dynamics, mixtures, centrifugal separation and multi-phase flows.

== Life and career ==
Born in New York City on February 22, 1933, Greenspan received his undergraduate degree in mathematics from CCNY in 1953. He earned his master's degree in 1954 and his Ph.D. in 1956, under supervision of G.F. Carrier, both from Harvard University, where then continued as assistant professor of Applied Mathematics. At 1960, he moved to MIT as an associate professor of Applied Mathematics, and then Professor, until his retirement as professor emeritus in 2002. Greenspan, along with C.C. Lin, was a central figure in the development of Applied Mathematics at MIT and served as chairman of the Applied Mathematics committee for more than a decade. He also served on the Board of Governors of the Technion, where he promoted the field of Applied Mathematics at this institute as well.

Along his career, Greenspan was a member of the American Academy of Arts and Sciences (1966), a Visiting Professor and Fairchild Scholar at the Caltech (1987), received an Honorary Doctorate at the Royal Institute of Technology in Stockholm (1991), and was a long-time consultant to industry and government and an editor of the 'Studies in Applied Mathematics' journal. He was the author of the books 'Theory of Rotating Fluids' (1968) and (with David Benney) 'Calculus: An Introduction to Applied Mathematics' (1973).

Greenspan retired from MIT in 2002. He died on March 20, 2026, at the age of 93.

== Research ==
Greenspan's academic career began with an investigation of waves on beaches (with G. F. Carrier). The result of this investigation, a now classical exact solution of the nonlinear theory, established conditions for the breaking of waves and as such remains a key element of tsunami research.

His study of the interaction of fluids and electromagnetism was among the earliest in the field of magneto-hydrodynamics to describe the structure and role of the complex boundary layers, and the upstream precursor caused by the propagation of Alfvén waves.

In 1962, motivated by a technological difficulty with a fluid gyroscope, Greenspan initiated an inquiry of rotating fluids. The result of which, was a complete and compact theory, supported by simple yet profound experiments. These experiments demonstrated counter-intuitive results regarding propagation of inertial waves and the flow-control exercised by boundary layers. In particular, the paper on spin-up, with L.N. Howard, is among the most often cited in the literature. His research monograph on this subject, continues to stimulate research and to support scientific and technological applications.

To assist cancer researchers, Greenspan formulated a theory of tissue fluid dynamics to explain the growth, form, and function of tumor nodules.

Scientific interests and industrial experience were synthesized in a patent for a centrifuge that separates, sorts and fractionates different particle species of a mixture in a truly continuous manner by means of an internal cascade of particle/flow diversions. He successfully constructed a patented prototype of an industrial machine at MIT that demonstrated the feasibility of the basic concept.
