= NPPL Championship Paintball 2009 =

2008 video game

- Cover of NPPL Championship 2009
- Developer(s): Sand Grain Studios
- Publisher(s): Activision
- Platform(s): PlayStation 2, PlayStation 3, Xbox 360, Wii
- Release: November 18, 2008
- Genre(s): First-person shooter Sports (Paintball)
- Mode(s): Single-player, Multiplayer

NPPL: Championship Paintball 2009 is a first-person paintball simulation game developed by Sand Grain Studios and released in 2008 for Xbox 360, PlayStation 2, PlayStation 3 and Wii.

The game strives to emulate the sport of paintball, specifically the National Professional Paintball League. Various game modes are present in Championship Paintball 2009, along with a career mode, licensed paintball gear, locations and layouts based on the NPPL, the Millennium European Paintball Series, and the XPSL.
