= Greenspan Commission =

National Commission on Social Security Reform

The National Commission on Social Security Reform, also known as the Greenspan Commission due to its chairmanship by Alan Greenspan, was a commission that was appointed by the United States Congress and President Ronald Reagan in 1981 to study and make recommendations regarding the short-term financing crisis that Social Security faced at that time. Its 1983 report led to the Social Security Reform Act of 1983. Greenspan himself was critical of this act, stating, "Do I like the present Social Security system? No. If you asked me whether it would be necessary in the ideal society, I'd say no. Our type of economy is far removed from where I would like to see it, but you have to be careful about moving from one type of society to another."
