= Lawrance Bohm =

American Lawyer (born 1972)

Lawrance A. Bohm
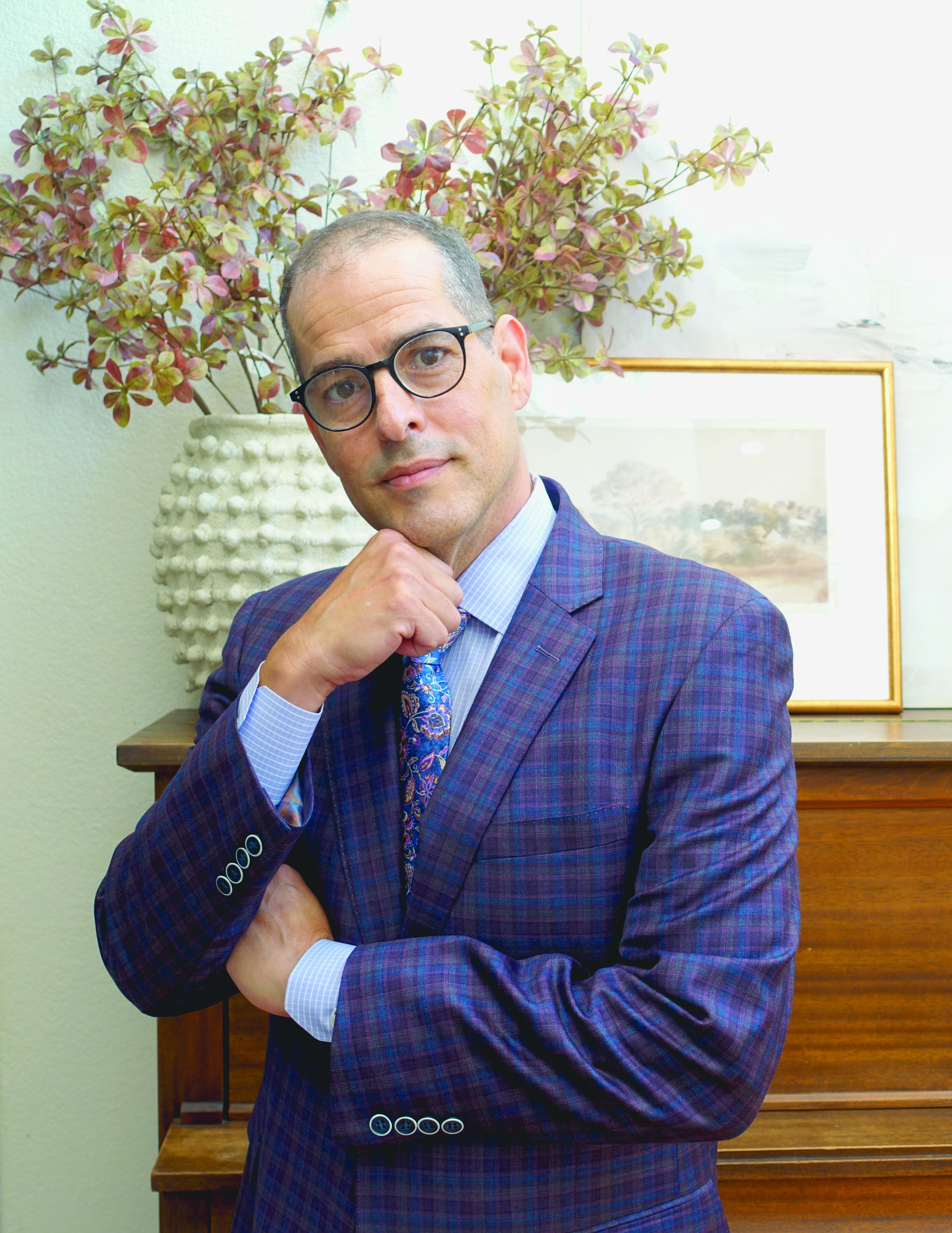
- Bohm in 2012
- Born: Lawrance Alexander Bohm; July 4, 1972 (age 54); Long Island, New York, US
- Education: University of California, Irvine (BS); Tulane University Law School (JD)
- Occupation: Trial lawyer
- Employer: Bohm Law Group
- Spouse: Elisa Bohm (m. 1997)
- Children: 3
- Website: www.bohmlaw.com www.tucentrolegal.com

Lawrance A. Bohm (born July 4, 1972) is an American lawyer who is most noted for winning what is believed to be the two largest single-plaintiff employment verdicts in United States history: $185,872,719 in Juarez v. AutoZone Stores, Inc. (2014, United States District Court, Southern District of California) and $167,730,488 in Chopourian v. Catholic Healthcare West (2012, United States District Court, Eastern District of California). He has won several other large verdicts, protecting and defending civil and workplace rights. Bohm has represented clients in several high-profile cases.

== Education ==
Bohm grew up on Long Island, New York and graduated high school in 1990. He received a B.S. degree in crime, law, and society from the University of California, Irvine, in 1995. He graduated from Tulane University Law School, cum laude, in 2000, and externed with United States District Court for the Eastern District of Louisiana Judge Ivan L.R. Lemelle. Bohm was president of his law school class and editor of the Tulane University Law School newspaper.

== Career ==
In 2000, Bohm began his legal career as an associate attorney at the law offices of Porter, Scott, Weiberg and Delehant in Sacramento, California, litigating personal injury, civil rights, and employment claims. In 2003, Bohm began working for Jackson Lewis P.C., a national employment defense firm litigating employment law cases, including claims asserted under the California Fair Employment and Housing Act and Title VII.

In 2005, he established the Bohm Law Group to pursue trial litigation with a focus on labor and employment disputes. Since 2005, he has assisted workers in a variety of workplace disputes, including wrongful termination, harassment, discrimination, retaliation, whistleblower protection, disability accommodation, severance negotiation, breach of contract, and wage and hour disputes. Bohm also represents clients in catastrophic injury, wrongful death, medical malpractice and other personal injury matters, including elder abuse and neglect.

== Important verdicts ==
In April 2024, Bohm obtained a $80,252,385 verdict in Brantley, et al v. Zurich American Insurance Company. Bohm and Kelsey Ciarimboli, Esq. achieved this massive verdict on behalf of three longtime employees who had been fired and accused of theft.

In December 2023, Bohm obtained a $11,182,000 verdict in Armstrong v. Life Care Centers of America. This was achieved on behalf of a woman who blew the whistle on her employer for substandard care given to a patient. She was fired and defamed after she complained that the facility in which she worked had provided negligent care to a patient.

In 2016. Bohm obtained a $2,871,984 verdict in Muniz v. Van Rein, et al.. This was achieved on behalf of a woman who was badly injured in a car accident and suffered from a brain injury and spinal injuries.

In November 2014, Bohm obtained a $185,872,719 verdict in Juarez v. AutoZone (2014, United States District Court, Southern District of California). At the time, this was believed to be the largest single-plaintiff employment verdict in US history. Rosario Juarez began her employment with AutoZone in 2000. She was finally promoted to store manager in 2004 after making discrimination complaints. After learning of Juarez's pregnancy, AutoZone discriminated against her by assigning her unnecessary, time-consuming work, and repeatedly ordering her to redo work for no reason. Her supervisor yelled at her and humiliated her in front of employees and customers. Even after Juarez beat all sales targets set by the company, AutoZone demoted her. After Juarez challenged her demotion in a lawsuit, AutoZone illegally retaliated by firing her.

In July 2012, Bohm obtained a verdict of $6,241,655 in Webb v. Ramos Oil Co. (2012, Yolo County Superior Court). The plaintiff, a tanker truck driver for Ramos Oil, was terminated from his employment for refusing to drive in a storm while intoxicated. Despite his concerns, dispatch told to continue driving. Webb refused, and was fired the next Monday.

In February 2012, Bohm obtained a verdict of $167,730,488 in a case against Catholic Healthcare West (2012, United States District Court, Eastern District of California). At the time, this case was believed to be the largest single-plaintiff employment verdict in United States history, now surpassed by Bohm’s 2014 verdict in Juarez v. AutoZone. The plaintiff, was terminated from her position as a surgical physician assistant in the cardiovascular surgery unit of Mercy General Hospital, a Sacramento hospital owned and operated by Catholic Healthcare West. During her employment, the plaintiff was subjected to daily unwanted sexual advances, physical contact, and inappropriate and demeaning sexual comments. She was also denied meal and rest breaks required by California law. After she made several written and verbal complaints to hospital officials regarding these violations and inappropriate patient care, including surgical errors, she became the subject of unwarranted disciplinary actions in retaliation, culminating in her termination.

In April 2010, Bohm obtained a personal injury verdict of $2,185,000 in Lang v. Geweke Motors, Inc. (2010, San Joaquin County Superior Court). The plaintiff's back was injured when his Suburban SUV was hit from behind by a Honda Civic. Neither vehicle required more than minimal repairs. The plaintiff received a two-level fusion within a year of the collision. This was Verdict Search’s verdict of the week in June 2010. Bohm set a second place mark in California for achieving three verdicts over one million dollars in a single year/

In February 2010, Bohm obtained a verdict of $1,500,000 in Cosby v. AutoZone (2010, United States District Court, Eastern District of California). The plaintiff was an AutoZone district manager who alleged failure to accommodate his sleep apnea condition. Although the jury found a basis for punitive damages, no additional monetary damages were awarded. The jury’s verdict included $1.3 million for emotional distress. On appeal, the United States Court of Appeals for the Ninth Circuit ordered the case be remanded back to the district court for remittitur regarding the issue of both economic and non-economic damages, with the option of a new trial on damages.

In January 2010, Bohm obtained a verdict of $1,368,675 in Kell v. Autozone (2010, Sacramento County Superior Court). The plaintiff, an AutoZone district manager, was terminated in retaliation for reporting unlawful harassment and discrimination by the company's human resources manager. The defendants' motion for a new trial was denied, even though the plaintiff received punitive damages in the maximum amount allowed by law. The court awarded an additional $780,000 in attorney's fees and costs. In February 2014, the California Third District Court of Appeal reduced the amount of punitive damages, but otherwise affirmed the judgment. This was Verdict Search’s verdict of the month for May 2010.

In 2007, Bohm obtained a $2,025,000 personal injury verdict in Ieremia v. Hilmar Unified School District (2007, San Joaquin County Superior Court). The plaintiff, a working mother of five, was ejected during a roll-over accident, resulting in painful scarring on her left side and face. The case was appealed and resulted in a published opinion affirming the verdict and clarifying the law concerning recovery for uninsured plaintiffs.

== Awards and honors ==
Bohm is a lifetime member of the Million Dollar Advocates Forum and Multi-Million Dollar Advocates Forum. In 2010, he was selected as one of the Daily Journal's Top Labor and Employment Lawyers in California. In 2012, he was selected as one of the Daily Journal's Top 100 Lawyers in California. Also in 2012, Bohm was selected by the Capital City Trial Lawyers Association as Advocate of the Year. He was ranked #1 on eBossWatch 2012 list of the Nation's Top Employment Lawyers. In 2013, Bohm was spotlighted in Sacramento Business Journal's 2013 Best of the Bar special edition. In 2014, he was named a Super Lawyer.

== Speaking engagements ==
Bohm is a weekly contributor and legal analyst to the David Cruz Show on The Patriot, AM 1150 KEIB radio program. He regularly appears on numerous other radio and television broadcasts.

Bohm is also a regular lecturer at legal conferences and is an adjunct professor of law at Tulane University Law School.

== Personal life ==
Bohm is married to Elisa (Williams) and has three children. He resides in Sacramento, California.
