= James Aguayo-Martel =

American physician and surgeon

- Born: James Benjamin Aguayo-Martel
- Education: Stanford University (BS); Harvard University (MD, MPH)
- Medical career
- Profession: Physician, surgeon, scientist
- Research: Nuclear magnetic resonance (NMR)

James Benjamin Aguayo-Martel is an American physician, surgeon and scientist. He is a former chair of surgery at Mercy San Juan Medical Center, and former chief of ophthalmology, otolaryngology (ENT), and plastic surgery at Sutter Roseville Medical Center. He is the former director of ophthalmology at Sutter General and Memorial Hospitals, and assistant professor of ophthalmology and radiology at Johns Hopkins Medical School and Wilmer Ophthalmological Institute. He is currently a clinical professor of ophthalmology and associate dean of graduate medical education in California Northstate University College of Medicine.

== Early life ==
Aguayo-Martel is of Mexican-American descent.

He received a Bachelor of Science degree from Stanford University, a Doctor of Medicine from Harvard Medical School, and a master's in public health in the area of epidemiology and biostatistics from the Harvard School of Public Health. He received his surgical subspecialty training in ophthalmology from Johns Hopkins Medical School and Wilmer Ophthalmological Institute. In the early 1980s, while at Harvard Medical School, Howe Laboratory of Ophthalmology, Massachusetts Eye and Ear Infirmary, he was among the first investigators to apply NMR spectroscopy to study tissue metabolism non-destructively.

== Career ==
After finishing his internship at the Beth Israel Hospital in Boston, Aguayo-Martel moved to Baltimore. There, at Johns Hopkins medical institutions, he led a research team as the associate director of NMR Research, which developed nuclear magnetic resonance (NMR) microscopy, a technique for non-invasively obtaining microscopic three-dimensional images of living objects. The technique first applied to a single living cell signaled the advent of a new class of instruments which would eventually allow monitoring cellular structures and their biochemistry inside the human body, or to perform "biopsies" without needles or surgery. He applied his MR microscopy to the study of ocular tissues and tumors, and used histological correlation to refine his technique. He was the first to study the biophysical properties of vitreous using NMR spectroscopy and imaging.

After the analysis of this ocular structure, he extended his research into the area of vitreous hemorrhage (bleeding into the eye), an area of great importance in loss of sight. He explored the use of three dimensional computerized tomography (CT) for the localization and compositional evaluation of intraocular and orbital foreign bodies. He pioneered the technique of deuterium NMR spectroscopy to study metabolism in biological systems. This technique extended the capabilities of existing NMR spectroscopy techniques used to investigate tissue metabolism. He applied his technique to the understanding of diabetic cataract formation and corneal metabolism in order to create new and improved methods of tissue preservation for improved tissue transplantation. He developed a novel method for monitoring activity in multiple metabolic pathways (hexose monophosphate shunt, glycolysis, and the polyol pathway) in the single living lens which allowed insight into the study of diabetic cataractogenesis. and applied to corneal tissue transplantation. His work culminated in the development of chemical shift NMR microscopy, which combined magnetic resonance imaging (MRI) and spectroscopy analysis while working at the Francis Bitter National Magnet Laboratory at MIT. His research team applied the technique to the study of the living lens to study diabetic cataractogenesis.

In 1987, Aguayo-Martel was an invited lecturer at the American Physical Society; the Symposium of the Committee on Applications of Physics: Microtomography-New Three Dimensional Microscopy and presented Grand Rounds at the National Eye Institute, National Institutes of Health on "A New Model of Diabetic Cataractogenesis." The understanding of the metabolism of glucose into sorbitol in the diabetic state has led to the development of a class of medications (aldose reductase inhibitor) to prevent eye and nerve damage in people with diabetes.

Aguayo-Martel has been noted for his work in low illumination ophthalmoscopy and co-inventing the technique of intraepikeratophakia, a precursor to the technique of LASIK.

He serves as director of ocular trauma, and chairman of the surgery department, at Mercy San Juan Medical Center. He is chief of ophthalmology, otolaryngology (ENT), and plastic surgery at Sutter Roseville Medical Center, and manages ocular trauma for Sutter Health Sacramento Sierra Region.

He is a fellow of the American Academy of Ophthalmology.
