= China Basin =

China Basin can refer to:

- China Basin, San Francisco, a neighborhood in San Francisco
- China Basin Bridge, another name for the Lefty O'Doul Bridge, a drawbridge which connects the China Basin and Mission Bay neighborhoods of San Francisco
- China Basin Landing, an office complex in the Mission Bay area of San Francisco, California
- China Basin Stakes, ungraded stakes race for three-year-olds and up, run at Golden Gate Fields
- Category:Drainage basins of China
  - Juyan Lake Basin
  - Nanyang Basin
  - Qaidam Basin
  - Sichuan Basin
  - Tarim Basin
  - Junggar Basin
