= Chopourian v. Catholic Healthcare West =

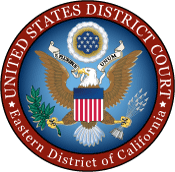
- Court: United States District Court for the Eastern District of California
- Full case name: Ani Chopourian v. Catholic Healthcare West
- Decided: February 29, 2012
- Docket nos.: 2:09-cv-02972

Court membership
- Judge sitting: Kimberly J. Mueller

Chopourian v. Catholic Healthcare West, No. 2:09-CV-02972 (E.D. Cal. Feb. 29, 2012), was a court case in the United States District Court for the Eastern District of California which, at the time, was believed to be the largest single-plaintiff employment verdict in US history, at $167,720,488. The record has since been surpassed by the verdict in Juarez v. AutoZone Stores, Inc., Case No. 08-CV-00417-WVG (S.D. Cal. Nov. 17, 2014), at $185,872,719.

== Background and trial ==
On August 1, 2009, almost a year after her termination from Catholic Healthcare West, Chopourian secured a position as a physician's assistant with Radiological Associates of Sacramento Medical Group, Inc. (RAS). A condition of employment was that she would obtain privileging at Mercy General Hospital. Chopourian was originally informed by Mercy that there would be no problem obtaining privileging. She was then informed that she would need national certification to obtain privileging. Chopourian studied for and took the exam, then renewed her application. In the interim, Chopourian's first deposition for her pending lawsuit against Catholic Healthcare West was taken on March 15, 2010. During the deposition, the defendant's counsel questioned Chopourian about documents she had recently produced in response to discovery requests, and concluded on the record that Chopourian had violated medical privacy laws. Chopourian was never investigated for such a violation, assessed civil penalties, or charged with criminal violation. In May 2010, she was informed that her credentialing privileges were being held up because of allegations that she violated patient privacy laws. Chopourian was denied privileges on June 8, 2010, and subsequently lost her job at RAS on June 21, 2010.

== Verdict ==
The verdict in favor of the plaintiff included $3,720,488 in economic damages, $39,000,000 in non-economic damages, and $125,000,000 in punitive damages. The trial lasted 11 days, and the jury deliberated for three days before unanimously finding in favor of the plaintiff on her claims of a hostile work environment, retaliation for workplace complaints, defamation, and intentional interference with economic advantage.

However, the judgment was later vacated by the court. On December 5, 2012, U.S. District Judge Kimberly J. Mueller granted the defendants' motion to dismiss and vacate the judgment. The court concluded that the jury's verdict was based on improper considerations, including the belief that the employer had violated healthcare law by retaliating against Chopourian for whistleblowing on patient safety issues.

== Trial counsel ==
Counsel for plaintiff:

- Lead counsel Lawrance Bohm, Bohm Law Group, Sacramento, CA
- Erika M. Gaspar, Law Office of Erika M. Gaspar, Sacramento, CA
- Gregory R. Davenport, Law Offices of Gregory R. Davenport, Stockton, CA

Counsel for defense:

- LeadcCounsel Judith C. Martin, La Follette, Johnson, De Haas, Fesler & Ames, Sacramento, CA
- Mary E. Greene, La Follette, Johnson, De Haas, Fesler & Ames, Sacramento, CA
- David Ditora, La Follette, Johnson, De Haas, Fesler & Ames, Sacramento, CA
