= St. Rose Dominican Hospital – Rose de Lima Campus =

- Dignity Health

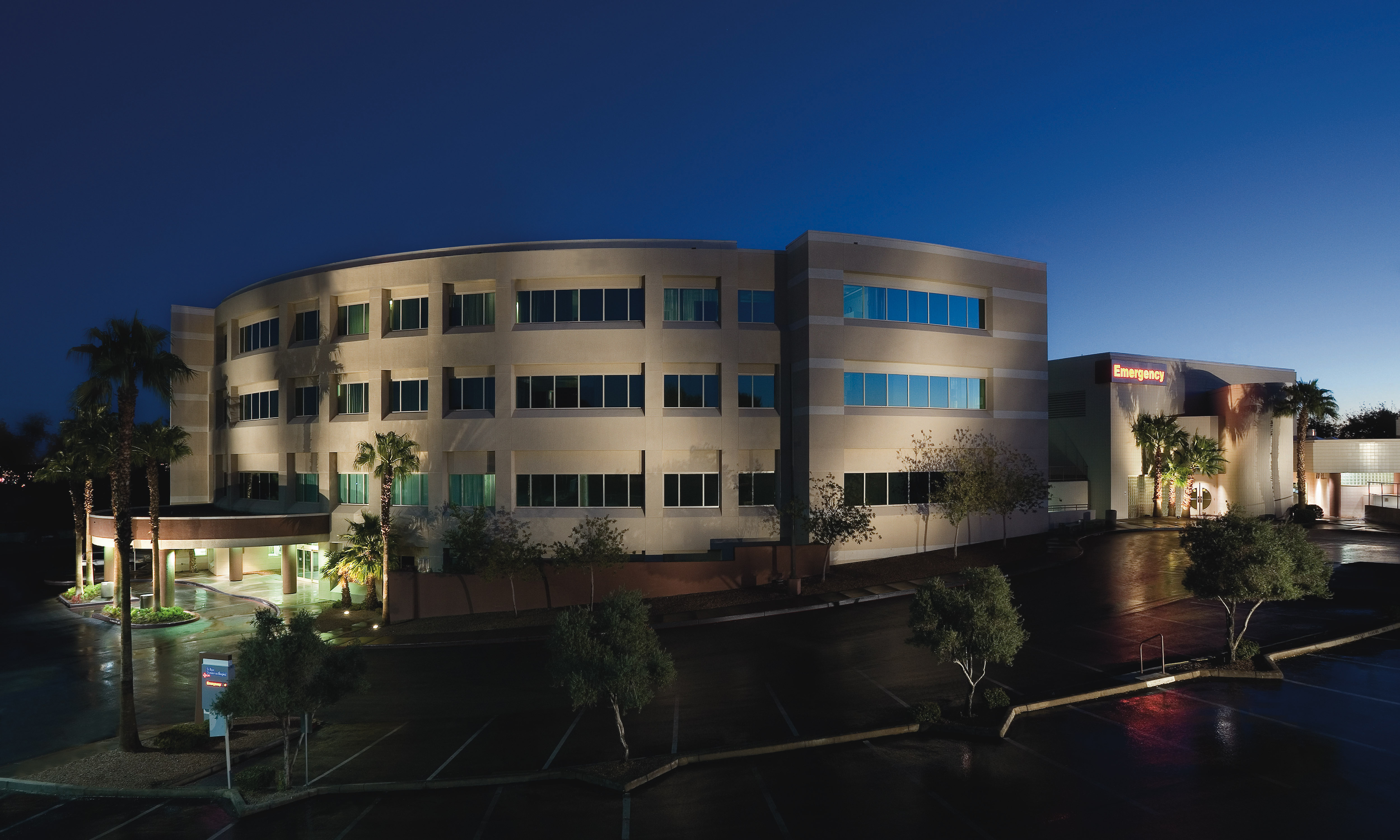

Geography
- Location: 102 East Lake Mead Parkway; Henderson, Clark County, Nevada, U.S.
- Coordinates: 36°02′20″N 114°59′00″W

Organisation
- Care system: Private
- Type: General and Teaching
- Affiliated university: University of Nevada, Reno School of Medicine (1969–2017); UNLV School of Medicine (2017–present)
- Network: Dignity Health

Services
- Standards: Joint Commission
- Emergency department: Yes
- Beds: 10

Helipads
- Helipad: Yes

History
- Founded: 1947; 79 years ago

Links
- Website: dignityhealth.org/las-vegas/locations/rose-de-lima

St. Rose Dominican Hospital – Rose de Lima Campus is a 220,000-square-foot (20,000 m^{2}) 10-bed non-profit hospital owned and operated by Dignity Health in Henderson, Nevada. It provides emergency care, diagnostic imaging, and limited general medicine and surgery in-patient care services.

== History ==
The Rose de Lima Campus is the oldest of the three St. Rose Dominican hospitals, named after Rose of Lima. It was founded in 1947 by the Adrian Dominican Sisters of Adrian, Michigan. Basic Magnesium Hospital purchased the hospital from the U.S. federal government for a nominal fee of one dollar a year for a period of 25 years. A $25 million, 4-story expansion was completed in 1991. Rose de Lima Campus completed a two-year transition to a small hospital in 2019.

St. Rose Dominican Hospital – Rose de Lima Campus was the first hospital in Southern Nevada to be fully accredited by the Joint Commission on Accreditation of Hospitals.

== Services ==
- Acute Rehabilitation Unit
- Bariatric Weight Loss Surgery Program
- Chapel and Chaplains
- Community Outreach Programs
- Emergency Department
- Get Well Network
- Home Health and Hospice services
- Inpatient Rehabilitation Facility
- Intensive Care Unit
- Inpatient laboratory services
- In- and out-patient surgical and rehabilitative services
- Joint Replacement Center
- Palliative Care
- PillCam Capsule Endoscopy
- Radiology services, including digital mammography
- Respiratory Therapy
- Wound Healing & Hyperbaric Medicine Center

== See also ==
- St. Rose Dominican Hospital – San Martín Campus
- St. Rose Dominican Hospital – Siena Campus
