= Dignity Health =

US not-for-profit healthcare system

- Formerly: Catholic Healthcare West (1986–2012)
- Type: Private
- Industry: Healthcare
- Founded: 1986; 40 years ago
- Fate: Merged
- Headquarters: China Basin Landing, San Francisco, California, U.S.
- Number of locations: 37 acute care hospitals 250 ancillary care sites
- Area served: Arizona, California, and Nevada
- Key people: Lloyd H. Dean (president/CEO); Daniel J. Morissette (CFO)
- Services: Hospital management
- Revenue: ▲$10,522,568,000 (2012)
- Operating income: ▲$59,112,000 (2012)
- Net income: ▲$132,549,000 (2012)
- Total assets: 11,364,399,198 United States dollar (2011)
- Owner: CommonSpirit Health
- Number of employees: 55,000
- Website: dignityhealth.org

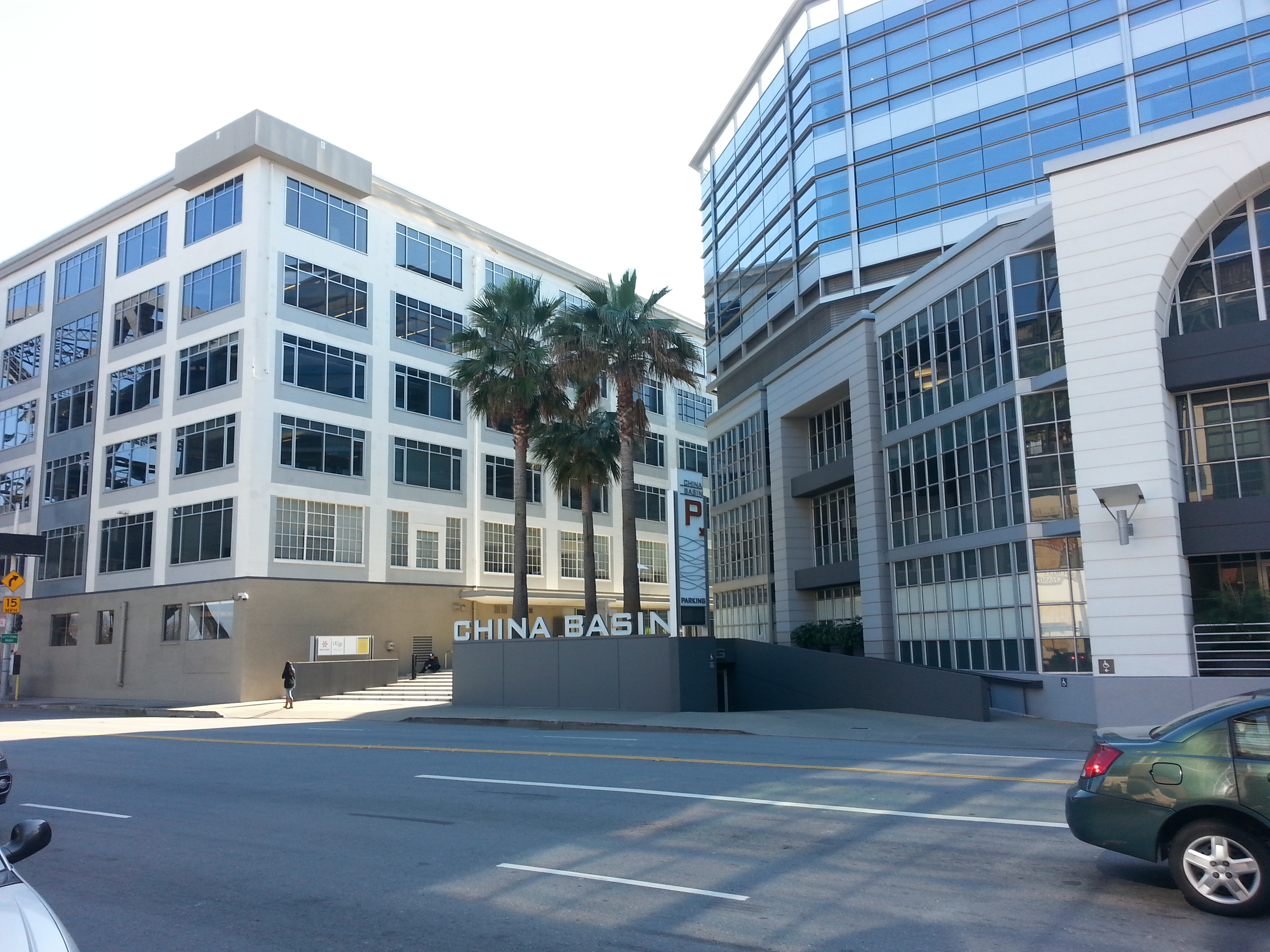
China Basin, the headquarters of Dignity Health

Dignity Health (formerly Catholic Healthcare West) is a California-based not-for-profit public-benefit corporation. Formerly a Catholic institution, the organization went independent in 2012 and adopted its new name. In February 2019, Dignity Health merged with Catholic Health Initiatives, becoming part of CommonSpirit Health.

== History ==
Catholic Healthcare West was founded in 1986, when the Sisters of Mercy Burlingame Regional Community and the Sisters of Mercy Auburn Regional Community merged their health care ministries into one organization.

In 2010, Dignity Health, Blue Shield of California, and Hill Physicians Medical Group formed an Accountable Care Organization that covers 41,000 individuals in the California Public Employees Retirement System (CalPERS).

From the time of its founding until 2012, the company was an official ministry of the Catholic Church. In 2012, the company's corporate governance structure changed, moving it out of the Catholic Church's purview and resulting in a name change to Dignity Health.

Adeptus Health partnered with Dignity Health to establish the Dignity Health Arizona General Hospital in Laveen, Arizona.

In 2018, Dignity Health and Catholic Health Initiatives received approval from the Vatican to merge. The merger was completed, on February 1, 2019, under a new name, CommonSpirit Health, forming the second-largest nonprofit hospital chain in the United States.

== Controversies ==
On December 21, 2010, Bishop Thomas Olmsted of the Roman Catholic Diocese of Phoenix declared that a Catholic Healthcare West hospital, St. Joseph’s Hospital and Medical Center, could no longer call itself a Catholic institution after a procedure was performed in 2009 to end a pregnancy to save a woman’s life. In a public statement, Bishop Olmsted said the procedure was in contrast to a direct abortion, which is in direct violation of The Ethical and Religious Directives for Catholic Health Care Services.

In a statement, St. Joseph’s President Linda Hunt said the hospital would comply with Olmsted’s decision, but she defended the actions of the hospital staff, stating, "If we are presented with a situation in which a pregnancy threatens a woman’s life, our first priority is to save both patients. If that is not possible, we will always save the life we can save, and that is what we did in this case. Morally, ethically, and legally, we simply cannot stand by and let someone die whose life we might be able to save." The story made national headlines.

Sister Carol Keehan, president of the Catholic Health Association of the United States, defended St. Joseph’s decision to terminate the pregnancy. "They had been confronted with a heartbreaking situation," she said in a formal statement. "They carefully evaluated the patient’s situation and correctly applied the Ethical and Religious Directives for Catholic Health Care Services to it, saving the only life that was possible to save."

In 2012, trustees of Ashland Community Hospital in Ashland, Oregon, invited Dignity Health to acquire it for debt. Community members raised concerns about the possible takeover, pointing to restrictions in Dignity's Statement of Common Values that might mean that the hospital would no longer offer abortion services, or euthanasia services under Oregon's 1997 Death With Dignity Act. Asked by Ashland mayor John Stromberg if the Statement of Common Values could be modified, Dignity Vice-President for Ethics and Justice Education Carol Bayley told community members, "As far as loosening it, don't hold out hope. We have our feet in Catholic mud, there is no denying it." Facing increasing community opposition, Dignity Health ceased negotiations without explanation on October 30, 2012.

Dignity Health was included by California Attorney General Kamala Harris on the antitrust investigation, launched in September 2012, into whether growing consolidation in the state's hospitals and physician groups was driving up the health care costs.

As of summer 2018, Dignity Health did not provide many services considered routine by non-religious providers, including some emergency procedures. Dignity Health has cited the "Ethical and Religious Directives for Catholic Health Care Services" as its guideline in approving or refusing medical procedures. That document is prepared by the United States Conference of Catholic Bishops. A particular controversy results from Dignity Health's non-Catholic marketing style, and unclear representations of which facilities are and are not considered Catholic.

In August 2024, Dignity Health and Mercy San Juan Medical Center were sued for "malicious and outrageous" conduct by the family of Jessie Peterson. They had been told in April 2023 that Peterson had checked out of the hospital, when in fact she had died in the care of Mercy San Juan. The hospital had then shipped Peterson's body to a storage facility, and did not inform her family. The family did not learn of Peterson's death until April 2024. When Peterson's body was recovered, it was too decayed to determine if her death was the result of medical malpractice.

== Hospitals ==
Dignity Health operates 38 hospitals—22 Catholic and 16 non-Catholic:

| Hospital | City | State | Founded | Acquired | Acquired from |
|---|---|---|---|---|---|
| Barrow Neurological Institute | Phoenix | Arizona | 1961 | 1986 | Mercy Health System |
| Chandler Regional Medical Center | Chandler | Arizona | 1961 | 1999 | |
| Mercy Gilbert Medical Center | Gilbert | Arizona | 2006 | 2006 | |
| St. Joseph's Hospital and Medical Center | Phoenix | Arizona | 1895 | 1986 | Mercy Health System |
| St. Joseph’s Westgate Medical Center | Glendale | Arizona | 2014 | 2014 | |
| Yavapai Regional Medical Center | Prescott | Arizona | | 2020 | |
| Arroyo Grande Community Hospital | Arroyo Grande | California | 1962 | 2004 | Universal Health Services |
| Bakersfield Memorial Hospital | Bakersfield | California | 1956 | 1996 | |
| California Hospital Medical Center | Los Angeles | California | 1887 | 1998 | UniHealth |
| Community Hospital of San Bernardino | San Bernardino | California | 1910 | 1998 | |
| Dominican Hospital | Santa Cruz | California | 1941 | 1988 | Adrian Dominican Sisters |
| French Hospital Medical Center | San Luis Obispo | California | 1946 | 2004 | Universal Health Services |
| Glendale Memorial Hospital and Health Center | Glendale | California | 1926 | 1998 | UniHealth |
| Marian Regional Medical Center | Santa Maria | California | 1940 | 1997 | Sisters of St. Francis of Penance and Christian Charity |
| Mark Twain St. Joseph's Hospital | San Andreas | California | 1951 | 1996 | Dominican Sisters of San Rafael |
| Mercy General Hospital | Sacramento | California | 1897 | 1986 | Mercy Healthcare |
| Mercy Hospital of Folsom | Folsom | California | 1962 | 1986 | Mercy Healthcare |
| Mercy Hospitals of Bakersfield, Southwest Campus | Bakersfield | California | 1992 | 1992 | |
| Mercy Hospitals of Bakersfield, Truxtun Campus | Bakersfield | California | 1910 | 1986 | Mercy Health System |
| Mercy Medical Center Merced | Merced | California | 1923 | 1996 | Racine Dominican Sisters |
| Mercy Medical Center Mt. Shasta | Mt. Shasta | California | | 1986 | Mercy Healthcare |
| Mercy Medical Center Redding | Redding | California | | 1986 | Mercy Healthcare |
| Mercy San Juan Medical Center | Carmichael | California | 1967 | 1986 | Mercy Healthcare |
| Methodist Hospital of Sacramento | Sacramento | California | 1973 | 1992 | |
| Northridge Hospital Medical Center | Los Angeles | California | 1955 | 1998 | UniHealth |
| Sequoia Hospital | Redwood City | California | 1950 | 1996 | Sequoia Healthcare District |
| Sierra Nevada Memorial Hospital | Grass Valley | California | 1958 | 1996 | |
| St. Bernardine Medical Center | San Bernardino | California | 1931 | 1996 | Sisters of Charity of the Incarnate Word |
| St. Elizabeth Community Hospital | Red Bluff | California | 1906 | 1995 | Sisters of Mercy, Omaha Regional Community |
| St. John's Hospital Camarillo | Camarillo | California | 1974 | 1994 | |
| St. John's Regional Medical Center | Oxnard | California | 1912 | 1986 | Mercy Health System |
| St. Joseph's Behavioral Health Center | Stockton | California | 1988 | 1996 | Dominican Sisters of San Rafael |
| St. Joseph's Medical Center | Stockton | California | 1899 | 1996 | Dominican Sisters of San Rafael |
| St. Mary Medical Center | Long Beach | California | 1923 | 1996 | Sisters of Charity of the Incarnate Word |
| Woodland Healthcare | Woodland | California | 1905 | 1996 | |
| St. Rose Dominican Hospital – Rose de Lima Campus | Henderson | Nevada | 1947 | 1988 | Adrian Dominican Sisters |
| St. Rose Dominican Hospital – San Martín Campus | Spring Valley | Nevada | 2006 | 2006 | |
| St. Rose Dominican Hospital – Siena Campus | Henderson | Nevada | 2000 | 2000 | |
