= St. John's Regional Medical Center (California) =

Coordinates: 34.215748°N 119.158516°W

- Dignity Health
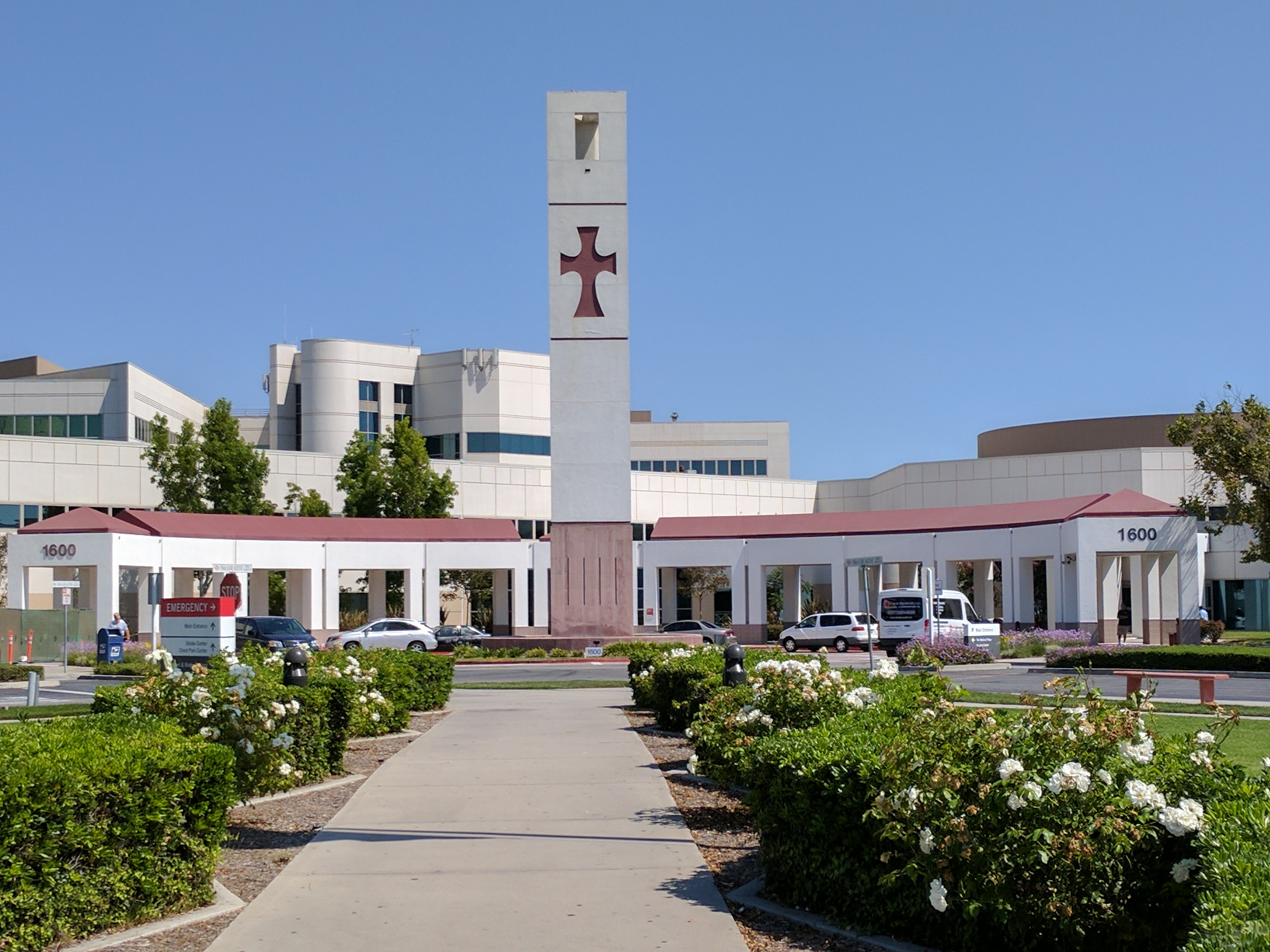
- Hospital Main Entrance

Geography
- Location: 1600 N Rose Ave, Oxnard, California, United States

Organization
- Care system: Private
- Type: Community
- Affiliated university: None

Services
- Beds: 230

History
- Founded: 1912

Links
- Website: http://www.dignityhealth.org/stjohnsregional/
- Lists: Hospitals in California

St. John's Regional Medical Center is a hospital located in Oxnard, California in the United States, and is operated by Dignity Health, along with its sister hospital, St. John's Hospital Camarillo in Camarillo. The hospital was founded in 1912.

Barry Wolfman serves as president and CEO of both St. John's Pleasant Valley and St. John's Regional Medical Center.

== History ==
In 1827 in Dublin, Ireland, Catherine McAuley, a wealthy Irish heiress, began caring for poor women and children. She wanted her service to the poor to endure, so she founded the Sisters of Mercy in 1831. The organization expanded to the United States in 1843, and by 1854, the Sisters of Mercy had settled in San Francisco, California.

In 1911, community leaders in Oxnard, California approached Reverend John S. Laubacher, pastor of Santa Clara Parish in Oxnard, out of concern that healthcare services were not available to meet the needs of the thousands of residents who had settled on the Oxnard Plain. At the request of Rev. Laubacher, the Sisters of Mercy, who by now had expanded their mission to Southern California, were invited to come from El Centro, California to Oxnard to establish St. John's Hospital (now known as St. John's Regional Medical Center). J.A. Driffel, manager of Oxnard's sugar beet factory, and Rev. Laubacher led the delegation to welcome the Sisters of Mercy from El Centro.

The sisters collaborated with Oxnard's community of ranchers, farmers, doctors and business leaders to make the dream of a hospital a reality. In May 1912, St. John's hospital was successfully opened in a temporary six-room wooden structure. John Borchard, a rancher, along with his family, donated 9 acres (3.6 ha) of land for the hospital site and $20,000 for the perpetual endowment of two hospital beds for the poor. The original six-room hospital was built by Oxnard pioneers John Borchard, J.A. Driffill, C.J. Elliott, Charles Donlon, W.H. Lathrop, L. Lehmann, and A. Levy. In honor of Rev. Laubacher, the hospital was named St. John's after his patron saint, St. John the Evangelist. Sister Mary Gabriel Gardiner from El Centro served as the first administrator of St. John's Hospital.

On April 25, 1915, Bishop Thomas J. Conaty blessed and dedicated the permanent hospital structure consisting of 25 patient beds, which was built right next to the temporary structure. Showing dignity and justice for the entire community, Rev. Laubacher declared that "the doors of this building are thrown open to the sick and suffering, regardless of creed or color."

In 1927, the hospital's staff and physicians were recognized for excellence in patient care when the American College of Surgeons, the first hospital accreditation agency, granted St. John's standardization approval.

Decades later in 1952, as a booming post-war population in Oxnard made it necessary to build a larger hospital, a two-story building with 75 patient beds was opened and dedicated by Cardinal James Francis McIntyre. This hospital was located on F Street in Oxnard. During the next 35 years, as community need grew, St. John's continued to expand the facility with the addition of two floors and ancillary areas.

In 1958, a broadcasting console was constructed at the hospital under the direction of John F. Conroy, chief engineer, with components donated by Peter J. Even. The console enabled patients to watch television programs from their beds and it enabled nurses to pipe music to remote stations throughout the hospital. This console was the first of its kind in the area.

In 1965, Dr. Raymond Ligouri opened the Coronary Care Unit (CCU) at St. John's Hospital—it was the first CCU in Ventura County and the third in Southern California. In 1985, Sister of Mercy Carmen Rodriguez opened the doors of St. John's Community Outreach Program, known today as Health Ministries.

As Oxnard's population continued to rapidly grow, community leaders and hospital administrators recognized that a larger and more centrally located facility was necessary. On October 24, 1992, Cardinal Roger Mahony dedicated and blessed the new 365,000-square-foot, 265-bed medical center in the presence of the Sisters of Mercy, community leaders, St. John's employees and supporters, and citizens who collaborated to make the new medical center a reality in Oxnard. The name of the hospital changed from St. John's Hospital to St. John's Regional Medical Center, which is now located at 1600 North Rose Avenue in Oxnard.

In 1993, St. John's Regional Medical Center in Oxnard merged with its sister hospital St. John's Hospital Camarillo (originally known as Pleasant Valley Hospital) in Camarillo, creating the largest acute healthcare organization in Ventura County.

In 1996, St. John's Cancer Center of Ventura County opened to offer free support programs and services for cancer patients and their families.

In 2005, the hospital dedicated the Mary Gabriel and Mary Michael Comfort Care Suites, Family Retreat, and Kitchen. The suites provide a peaceful environment in a home-like setting for palliative care patients and their families. In 2009, St. John's Palliative Care Program was honored with the prestigious Circle of Life Recognition.

In 2010, the hospital added a 128-slice computed tomography (CT) scanner to its diagnostic imaging services.

== Awards ==
In 2003, St. John's Regional Medical Center and St. John's Pleasant Valley Hospital's community newsletter, which at the time was called Living Well, was presented with the prestigious Bronze award by HMR Publications Group, Inc. at the annual Healthcare Advertising Awards in the Newsletter category. Living Well was produced by St. John's Public Relations and Communications Department and published by Diablo Custom Publishing (DCP).

In 2005, 2006, and 2007, St. John's Regional Medical Center was a recipient of the HealthGrades Cardiac Care Excellence Award. Additionally, St. John's Regional Medical Center was five-star rated for treatment of heart attack by HealthGrades. In 2007, St. John's Regional Medical Center was honored with the HealthGrades Cardiac Surgery Excellence Award—given only to the top five percent of hospitals in the nation.

In 2006, in a report released by the Office of Statewide Health Planning and Development (OSHPD), St. John's Regional Medical Center earned a rating of Better in the first mandatory "California Report on Coronary Artery Bypass Graft (CABG) Surgery 2003 Hospital Data." St. John's was one of only four hospitals in California, and the only hospital in Ventura County, to earn this designation.

In June 2008, St. John's Regional Medical Center with FleishmanHillard won a Silver Anvil Award, sponsored by the Public Relations Society of America, which recognizes outstanding achievement in strategic public relations planning and implementation. The award was presented to St. John's Public Relations and Communications Department as a result of its extensive community outreach effort to inform employees, physicians, patients and their families, neighbors, and the media of plans for the temporary suspension of hospital operations to successfully treat mold at St. John's Regional Medical Center in August 2007.

In July 2009, St. John's Regional Medical Center and St. John's Pleasant Valley Hospital received a Circle of Life Award Citations of Honor from the American Hospital Association.
