= St. John's Hospital Camarillo =

- Dignity Health

Geography
- Location: 2309 Antonio Ave, Camarillo, California, United States
- Coordinates: 34°14′35″N 119°01′06″W

Organization
- Care system: Private
- Type: Community
- Affiliated university: None

Services
- Beds: 181

History
- Founded: 1974

Links
- Website: http://www.dignityhealth.org/stjohnscamarillo/
- Lists: Hospitals in California

St. John's Hospital Camarillo is a hospital in Camarillo, California, United States, operated by Dignity Health, with its sister hospital St. John's Regional Medical Center in Oxnard, California.

The hospital was founded in 1974 by a group of community leaders and physicians. In addition to its 81 acute-care beds, St. John's Hospital Camarillo has a 99-bed extended care unit and the only hyperbaric medicine unit in western Ventura County.

Darren Lee serves as president and CEO of both St. John's Hospital Camarillo and St. John's Regional Medical Center.

== History ==
Originally named Pleasant Valley Hospital, the hospital opened in July 1974. Located on a 12-acre (4.9 ha) site near the foothills of Camarillo, the hospital was built with five acres that were donated originally by the Berylwood Investment Company. James P. Lockett designed the facility using a hexagon shape first seen in early Roman architecture.

In 1976, Pleasant Valley Hospital received accreditation from the Joint Commission of Accreditation of Hospitals (JCAHO). That same year, the hospital reached full occupancy of its 46 beds for the first time since opening.

In 1986, ground breaking began for the new 99-bed skilled nursing facility. The first floor's 49 beds were used for rehabilitation of stroke victims, heart attack victims, and patients on respirators. The second floor's 50 beds were used for long-term care patients.

In 1993, Pleasant Valley Hospital in Camarillo became known as St. John's Pleasant Valley Hospital, after it merged with St. John's Regional Medical Center in Oxnard.

In 1997, St. John's hospitals joined Catholic Healthcare West (CHW) as part of the CHW Central Coast system of hospitals. After the merger of the two hospitals, St. John's Pleasant Valley Hospital underwent significant growth. The hospital added technology including wound treatment, hyperbaric medicine oxygen chambers, and diagnostic imaging equipment.
