= St. Rose Dominican Hospital – Siena Campus =

- Dignity Health

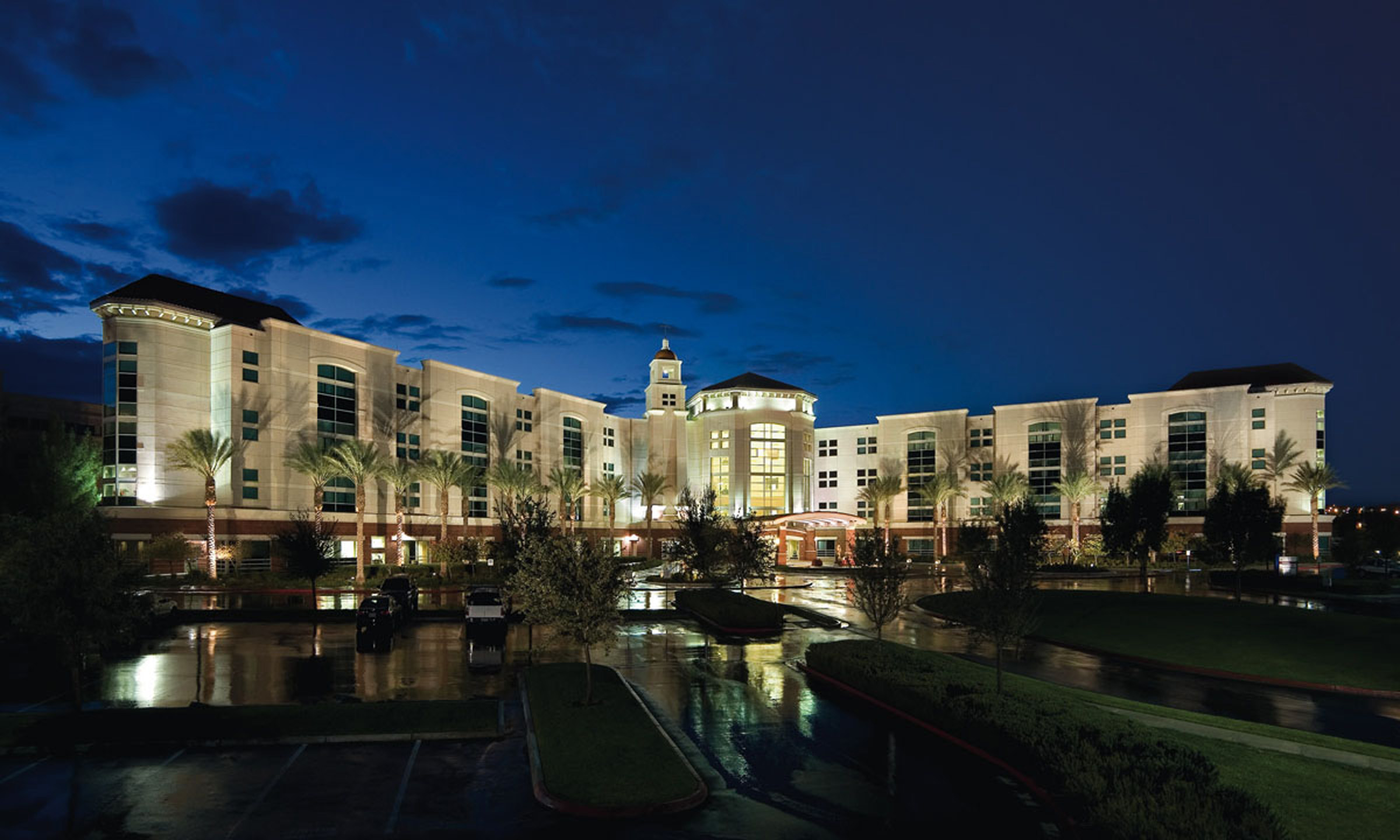

Geography
- Location: 3001 Saint Rose Parkway; Henderson, Clark County, Nevada, U.S.
- Coordinates: 36°00′24″N 115°06′52″W

Organisation
- Care system: Private
- Type: General and Teaching
- Affiliated university: University of Nevada, Reno School of Medicine (2000–2017); UNLV School of Medicine (2017–present)
- Network: Dignity Health

Services
- Standards: Joint Commission
- Emergency department: Level III trauma center
- Beds: 366

Helipads
- Helipad: Yes

History
- Founded: 2000; 26 years ago

Links
- Website: dignityhealth.org/las-vegas/locations/siena

St. Rose Dominican Hospital – Siena Campus is Southern Nevada's only faith-based non-profit hospital owned and operated by Dignity Health and is located in Henderson, Nevada.

Siena Hospital ranks #5 in Nevada in America’s Best-in-State Hospitals by 2025 Newsweek and Statista. The ranking is based on a nationwide online survey of health care professionals, quality of care metrics, accreditation data, patient satisfaction data, and a Patient-Reported Outcome Measures survey.

== History ==
Siena Campus was the second St. Rose Dominican facility to open in Southern Nevada, bringing much-needed healthcare services to the growing Henderson area in 2000. The campus now serves as a hub for many of St. Rose Dominican's tertiary services.

== Services and Features ==
- Opened in 2000
- 366 beds
- 636,000 square feet (59,100 m^{2})
- Cardiology/Open Heart Surgery Center
- Chapel and chaplains
- Community Outreach Programs
- Da Vinci robotic surgical system
- Emergency Department
- Get Well Network
- Healing Garden
- Home Health and Hospice services
- Intensive Care Unit
- Inpatient laboratory services
- In and outpatient surgical and rehabilitative services
- Joint Replacement Center
- Level III Neonatal Intensive Care Unit (NICU)
- Level III Trauma Center
- Obstetrical services (Maternal Child Center)
- Oncology Unit
- Palliative Care
- Pediatric Emergency Department
- Pediatric Unit, 24-hour emergency room, and ICU
- Radiology services, including digital diagnostic and neuro-interventional
- Respiratory Therapy

== See also ==
- St. Rose Dominican Hospital – Rose de Lima Campus
- St. Rose Dominican Hospital – San Martín Campus
