= St. Rose Dominican Hospital – San Martín Campus =

- Dignity Health

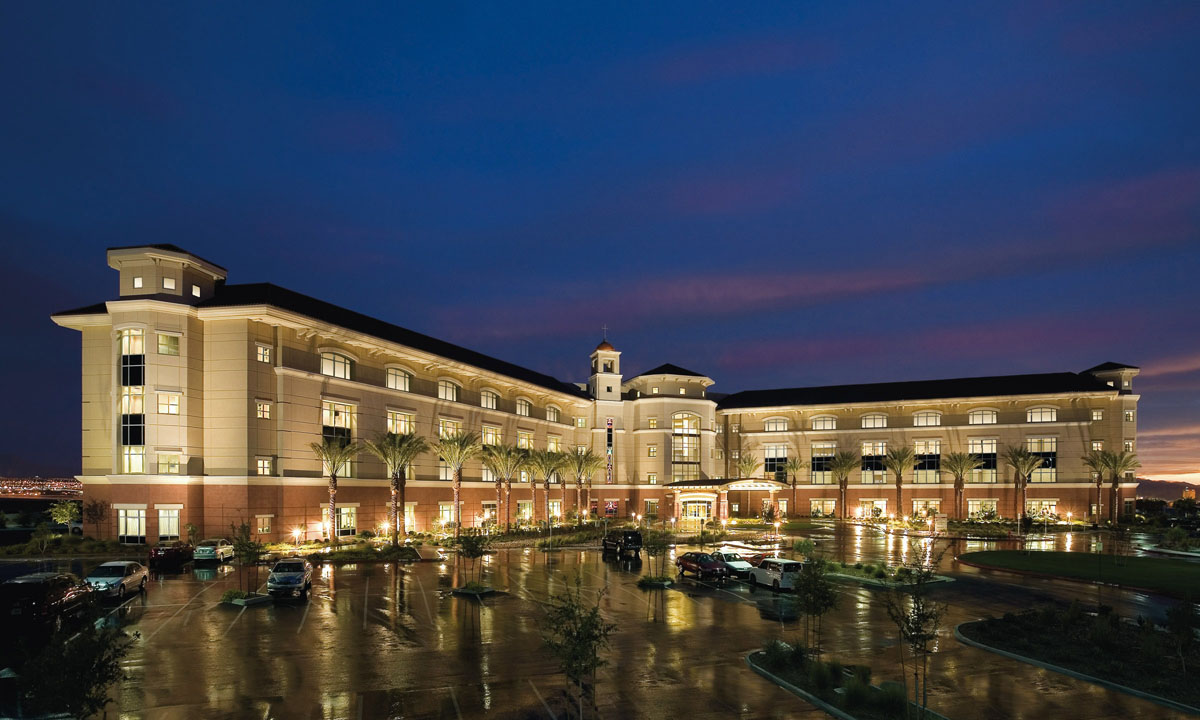

Geography
- Location: 8280 West Warm Springs Road; Enterprise, Clark County, Nevada, U.S.
- Coordinates: 36°03′20″N 115°16′25″W

Organisation
- Care system: Private
- Type: General and Teaching
- Affiliated university: University of Nevada, Reno School of Medicine (2006–2017); UNLV School of Medicine (2017–present)
- Network: Dignity Health

Services
- Standards: Joint Commission
- Emergency department: Yes
- Beds: 147

Helipads
- Helipad: Yes

History
- Founded: November 2006; 19 years ago

Links
- Website: dignityhealth.org/las-vegas/locations/san-martin

St. Rose Dominican Hospitals are Southern Nevada's only faith-based non-profit hospitals owned and operated by Dignity Health and the San Martin Campus is located in Enterprise, Nevada. The hospital provides 147 beds all located in private rooms.

In late 2006, the San Martín Campus opened in the southwest corner of the valley, becoming the third St. Rose Dominican facility in Southern Nevada and expanding the system's reach outside of Henderson. It is named after Saint Martin de Porres, a saint of the Dominican Order.

San Martin Hospital ranks #1 in Nevada in America’s Best-in-State Hospitals by 2025 Newsweek and Statista. The ranking is based on a nationwide online survey of healthcare professionals, quality of care metrics, accreditation data, patient satisfaction data, and a Patient-Reported Outcome Measures survey.

== History ==
One of the nation's five largest health care systems, Dignity Health is a 21-state network of nearly 9,000 physicians, 55,000 employees, and more than 380 care centers, including hospitals, urgent and occupational care, imaging centers, home health, and primary care clinics. Headquartered in San Francisco.

== Services ==
- Opened in November 2006
- 147 beds
- 346,535 square feet (32,194.2 m^{2})
- Services and Features:
- Cardiology/Electrophysiology (EP) Lab/Open Heart Surgery Center
- Chapel and chaplains
- Community Outreach Programs
- Emergency Department
- Get Well Network
- Healing Garden
- Home Health and Hospice services
- Intensive Care Unit
- Inpatient laboratory services
- In-and out-patient surgical and rehabilitative services
- Joint Replacement Center
- Palliative Care
- Pediatrics
- Radiology services, including digital diagnostics
- Respiratory
- Wound Healing & Hyperbaric Medicine Center

== See also ==
- St. Rose Dominican Hospital – Rose de Lima Campus
- St. Rose Dominican Hospital – Siena Campus
