= Dominican Convent, Regensburg =

Coordinates: 49.0202°N 12.0851°E

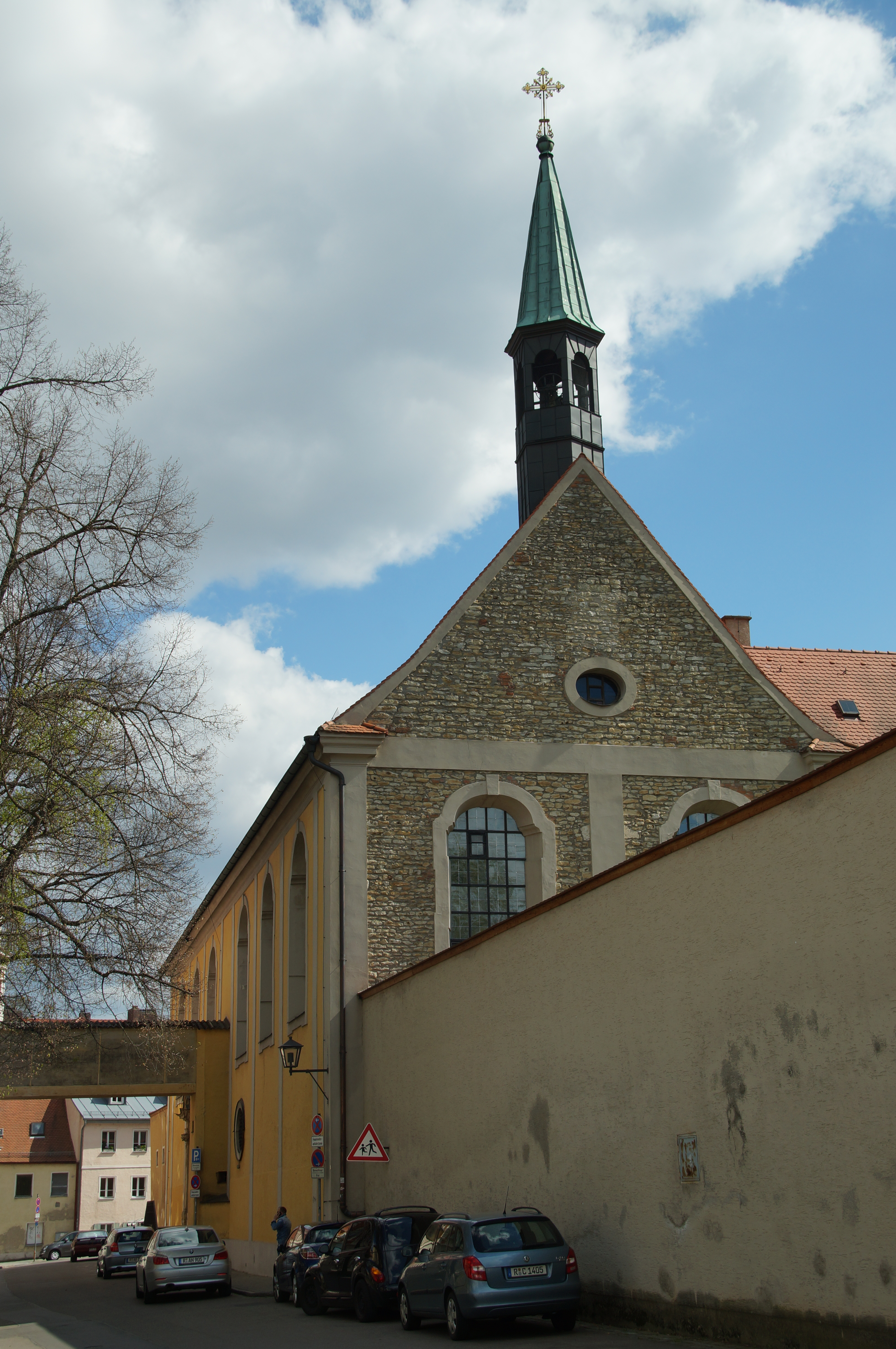
Church of the Holy Cross

The Dominican Convent, Regensburg is a convent of the Dominican Order in Regensburg in Bavaria in the Roman Catholic Diocese of Regensburg.

== History ==
A convent of the Holy Cross was founded in 1233 (792 years ago) and was preserved by the secularization in Bavaria. In 1803 a girls' school was founded which remains to the present time.

In the library of Keble College, Oxford, is an illuminated manuscript from the convent, "Lectionarium Ordinis Fratrum Praedicatorum" known in English as the Regensburg Lectionary (for the convent of Dominican nuns "zum Heiligen Kreuz", Regensburg, c. 1267–76).

North America

In 1853 the Prioress Mother Maria Benedicta Bauer sent some sisters to America. There are today 12 American congregations which derive from the Regensburg convent. Among them are the Dominican Sisters of Adrian, Michigan, and the Racine Dominican Sisters.
