= Methodist Hospital of Sacramento =

Coordinates: 38.4641°N 121.4174°W

- Dignity Health

Geography
- Location: 7500 Hospital Drive, Sacramento, CA 95823, Sacramento, California, United States

Organization
- Care system: Private
- Type: Community
- Affiliated university: None

Services
- Beds: 162

History
- Founded: 1973

Links
- Website: www.methodistsacramento.org
- Lists: Hospitals in California

Methodist Hospital is a hospital located in the southern part of Sacramento, California. It is located just off Highway 99 by taking the Calvine Road/Consumnes River Boulevard exit 289. Its address is 7500 Hospital Drive. The hospital has 162 acute care beds. In 2011, 9,136 patients were admitted, 53,056 emergency department visits were made, and 1,188 babies were delivered. The hospital has more than 430 physicians and approximately 1,133 employees. It is currently operated by Dignity Health, who acquired the hospital in 1992.

On July 28, 2011, Becker's Hospital Review listed Methodist Hospital of Sacramento under 60 Hospitals With Great Orthopedic Programs. It has been designated as a Blue Distinction Center for Knee and Hip Replacement by Blue Shield of California. The surgeons at the hospital focus on joint replacement, spine surgery and sports medicine. The surgeons are able to stay on the cutting edge by performing a minimally invasive partial knee replacement procedure with The Oxford Knee or the Opus Magnum minimally invasive procedure for rotator cuff tears. The department also includes hand and foot surgery specialists and outpatient rehabilitation centers designed for patients with extremities injuries and conditions.

== Hospital rating data ==
The HealthGrades website contains the clinical quality data for Methodist Hospital of Sacramento, as of 2018. For this rating section clinical quality rating data and patient safety ratings are presented.

For inpatient conditions and procedures, there are three possible ratings: worse than expected, as expected, better than expected. For this hospital the data for this category is:

- Worse than expected - 1
- As expected - 12
- Better than expected - 5

For patient safety ratings the same three possible ratings are used. For this hospital they are:

- Worse than expected - 2
- As expected - 9
- Better than expected - 1

Percent of patients who would rate this hospital as a 9 or 10 - 63%. Percent of patients nationally who rate hospitals on average a 9 or 10 - 69%.
