= Sequoia Hospital =

Coordinates: 37°28′46″N 122°15′17″W

- Dignity Health

Geography
- Location: Redwood City, California, United States

Organization
- Care system: Private
- Type: Community
- Affiliated university: None

Services
- Emergency department: Basic Emergency Services
- Beds: 330

History
- Founded: 1950

Links
- Website: http://www.sequoiahospital.org
- Lists: Hospitals in California

Sequoia Hospital is a hospital in Redwood City, California, US. It is operated by Dignity Health.

== History ==
=== Founding ===
In 1938, a group of nine women led by Mary "Dove" Beeger appealed to the city council in Redwood City for a hospital to serve the communities of southern San Mateo County. The city council authorized a study that confirmed the lack of hospital facilities locally. But construction was delayed first by decisions to issue bonds to build a city hall and to build a library, and then by World War II. In 1946, voters approved the creation of the Sequoia Hospital District. Construction of the hospital began in 1949 as one of the first district hospitals in California. The 106-bed hospital was dedicated on October 15, 1950 and the first patient admitted on October 25, 1950.

=== Merger ===
In 1995, the hospital was struggling with losses that resulted in layoffs. It lost $1.9 million in 1994 and $7.8 million in 1995. The hospital board sought partners for an affiliation or merger and received proposals from Adventist Health System/West Inc., Columbia/HCA Healthcare Corp. and Catholic Healthcare West. On March 20, 1996, the hospital board voted 4–1 to affiliate with the non-profit Catholic Healthcare West (rather than the for-profit Columbia/HCA). Ballot Measure H was put to Sequoia Hospital District voters, who approved the merger. The agreement called for the creation of a governing board for the hospital, with equal representation from Catholic Healthcare West and the Sequoia Hospital District and for CHW to pay $30 million to the district.

=== Rebuilding ===
After several hospitals were damaged or closed as a result of the 1994 Northridge earthquake, the state passed Senate Bill 1953, which required hospitals to meet new seismic standards. As a result, Sequoia Hospital explored the possibility of building a new hospital, possibly at a new location in Redwood City.

However, in 2007, the hospital decided to construct the new building on its existing campus. On November 30, 2007, the Sequoia Healthcare District approved a funding plan for the new hospital in which Sequoia Hospital, Sequoia Healthcare District and CHW would each contribute $75 million toward the cost, with an additional $15 million to be raised by Sequoia Hospital Foundation. The plan called for CHW to take full ownership of the hospital, with half of the earnings over forty years to go to Sequoia Hospital District.

The building plan included a new hospital with 167 beds, an expanded emergency room, a new medical office building with outpatient surgery facilities and a four-story parking garage. Construction of the new medical office building was completed in 2011, while the new hospital building and all seismic upgrades were completed by 2014.

== Medical services ==
The hospital is certified by the Joint Commission as a Primary Stroke Center Program. The cardiac care department is highly ranked by HealthGrades, including:

- Best in California for Coronary Interventional Procedures
- HealthGrades 2008 Cardiac Care Excellence Award recipient
- HealthGrades 2008 Cardiac Surgery Excellence Award recipient
- Top 5% in the Nation for Overall Cardiac Services, Cardiology Services, and Coronary Interventional Procedures

== See also ==
- List of hospitals in California
