= Community Hospital of San Bernardino =

Coordinates: 34.131636°N 117.322473°W

- Dignity Health

Geography
- Location: 1805 Medical Center Dr, San Bernardino, CA 92411, California, United States

Organization
- Care system: Private
- Type: Community
- Affiliated university: California State University, San Bernardino

Services
- Emergency department: Basic Emergency Services
- Beds: 343

History
- Founded: 1910

Links
- Website: http://www.chsb.org/
- Lists: Hospitals in California

Community Hospital of San Bernardino (CHSB) is a 343-bed non-profit hospital in San Bernardino, California, USA. It is currently affiliated with Dignity Health, but remains a non-denominational community hospital. The hospital is one of the region's largest employers, with more than 1,350 employees, and primarily serves the areas of San Bernardino, Rialto, Colton, Highland and Fontana.

== History ==
Timeline of Community Hospital of San Bernardino

1909: Dr. Henry William Mills and Ralph E. Swing purchased the site of an old adobe saloon at 4th St. and Arrowhead Avenue, and began construction of a 2-story stucco hospital building.

1910: 42-bed Ramona Hospital opened.

1932: Bank took over operation of Ramona Hospital due to financial losses suffered during the Great Depression. 16 Doctors, a Dentist, and a layman formed the Ramona Hospital Association, donating over $40,000 to buy the hospital back from the bank.

1938: Ramona Hospital Association reorganized into a charitable non-profit corporation with a new name - "San Bernardino Community Hospital".

1953: San Bernardino Community Hospital purchased property at the current location of 17th St. and Western Avenue.

1954: Entertainer Sammy Davis Jr. was taken to San Bernardino Community Hospital after being injured in a car accident. Dr. Frederick H. Hull was able to save the sight in his right eye.

1958: Construction completed of new hospital facility at 17th St. and Western Avenue. This was the first air-conditioned hospital in the city, with 133 beds, 30 bassinets, and 275 employees.

1958: Sammy Davis Jr. hosted a star-studded fundraiser at the Swing Auditorium, featuring Judy Garland, Tina Louise, Shirley MacLaine, Diahann Carroll, and many others. The show, attended by over 8,000 people, raised over $31,048 for furnishings at the new hospital.

1961: Major expansion program added 95 beds, conference rooms, an auditorium, enlarged emergency facilities, a new obstetrical delivery area, and a service building.

1964-1971: Various hospital expansions included a new laboratory, new lobby and business office, 125-bed extended-care facility, new physical therapy building, expanded maternity wing, renovation of intensive care and coronary care wing, and expansion of radiology, cardiopulmonary, and central supply. By 1971, the total bed count was increased to 322.

1989: Five-story patient care tower opened. The tower was named for Monida B. Cummings, the daughter of famed firearm designer John Moses Browning. Cummings donated over $1 Million to the construction of the new tower.

1993: 60-bed Robert H. Ballard Rehabilitation Hospital opened.

1996: 57,000-square-foot (5,300 m^{2}) Medical Office Building (Community Medical Plaza) opened. The new building was connected to the hospital by a bridge that spans Medical Center Drive.

1998: Affiliated with Catholic Healthcare West

2007: Community Hospital of San Bernardino named as only the 61st Baby Friendly Hospital in the United States.

2008: Community Hospital Auxiliary celebrates 50 years, and over 1 million hours, of volunteer service.

2009: Community Hospital of San Bernardino named by HealthGrades as one of the top 10% of hospitals for Maternity Care, with a five-star rating.

2010: Community Hospital of San Bernardino celebrates 100 years of service to the community. Currently, more than 13,000 patients are admitted to the hospital each year, and more than 40,000 are treated in the Emergency Department.

2012: Catholic Healthcare West renamed Dignity Health.

== Services ==
- 24-Hour Emergency Department
- Obstetrical Services
- Acute Inpatient Medical/Surgical Care
- Behavioral Health Services
- Neurological Subacute Care for Children and Adults
- Inpatient and Outpatient Surgery
- Critical and Intensive Care
- Home Health Services
- Community Education Programs

== Executive leadership ==
Anthony Coleman, DHA - President / CEO

- - Vice President Mission / Support Services
- Victoria Selby - Interim Vice President / Chief Nursing Officer
- Marc Marchetti - Vice President Business Development / Physician Alignment
- Denice Findlay - IE Mkt Director Human Resources
- Anita Chou - Vice President Finance / CFO

== See also ==
- List of hospitals in California

== Bibliography ==
- Hanson, Joyce A., Suzie Earp, and Erin Shanks. Images of America - Community Hospital of San Bernardino, Arcadia Publishing, ISBN 978-0738570228
