= Mercy General Hospital =

- Dignity Health

Geography
- Location: Sacramento, California, United States
- Coordinates: 38.57°N 121.45248°W

Organization
- Care system: Private
- Type: Community
- Affiliated university: None

Services
- Beds: 342

History
- Founded: 1925

Links
- Lists: Hospitals in California

Mercy General Hospital is a not-for-profit private community hospital located in the East Sacramento neighborhood of Sacramento, CA. The hospital has 342 beds and over 2,000 clinical staff, and serves as the major Cardiac Surgery referral center for the Greater Sacramento Service Area Dignity Hospitals, as well as for Kaiser Permanente. The Mercy Heart Institute and the Mercy Stroke Center are key features of the hospital. It is a member of the Dignity Health network.

In 2014, The Alex G. Spanos Heart & Vascular Center was opened. This four story addition to the hospital added: 71 private, family-friendly patient rooms, 21-bed cardiac ambulatory procedure area, 20-bed cardiac surgery ICU, dedicated Cardiovascular Operating Room (CVOR), and a new interventional cardiac catheterization lab.

With this expansion all cardiopulmonary services were brought under one roof: Cardiac Rehabilitation, Cardiac Support Unit, Cardiopulmonary Services (Respiratory Care, EKG, Echo), and Electrophysiology.

== Services ==
Mercy General hospital places special emphasis on Cardiac Care and Neuroscience/Spine and Rehabilitative Services. It currently possesses 284 inpatient beds, a 20-bed Cardiovascular Intensive Care Unit (CVICU), 18-bed Medical-Surgical-Neurosurgical Intensive Care Unit (MSNICU), and 20-bed Emergency Department (ED).

The Health Heart & Vascular Institute is the largest cardiac surgical program of its kind in California. The Neuroscience Service centers around its biplane angiography suite, allowing its neurosurgeons to perform neurological interventional coiling.

Resident Physicians from the Mercy Methodist Family Medicine Program complete portions of their PGY-2 and PGY-3 Internal Medicine rotations at Mercy General, where they work alongside Intensivists, Internists, and Family Medicine Physicians.

== Rankings and awards ==
Mercy General has been named by Healthgrades as one of America's 50 Best Hospitals for Cardiac Surgery and one of America's 100 Best Hospitals for Cardiac Care and also received the Distinguished Hospital - Clinical Excellence; Critical Care – Excellence Award; and 5-Star Ratings for Coronary Artery Bypass (15 years in a row), Valve Surgery, Heart Attack and Heart Failure.

In addition to cardiac care, Mercy General was also awarded by Healthgrades with the Critical Care Excellence Award.

U.S. News & World Report ranks Mercy General as "High Performing" in Aortic Valve Surgery, Colon Cancer Surgery, Heart Bypass, and Heart Failure.

Mercy General is a Joint Commission Certified Chest Pain Center, and has also been recognized by the Society of Chest Pain Centers, the Society of Cardiovascular Patient Care, and the American Association of Cardiovascular and Pulmonary Rehabilitation.

== Sources ==
- Mercy General Hospital mercygeneral.org Retrieved: 2010-05-17.
