= Juarez v. AutoZone Stores, Inc. =

Californian labor law case

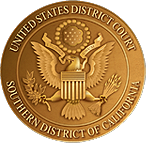
- Court: United States District Court for the Southern District of California
- Full case name: Rosario Juarez v. AutoZone Stores, Inc. (Case No. 08-CV-00417-WVG)
- Decided: November 17, 2014

Court membership
- Judge sitting: Hon. William V. Gallo

Juarez v. AutoZone Stores, Inc., Case No. 08-CV-00417-WVG (S.D. Cal. Nov. 17, 2014), was a court case in the United States District Court for the Southern District of California which is believed to be the largest single-plaintiff employment verdict in United States history at $185,872,719.52. This case is also believed to be the largest punitive damages verdict awarded to a single plaintiff in an employment discrimination lawsuit.

== Background and trial ==
Rosario Juarez worked for AutoZone beginning in December 1999 as a cashier. She was promoted to the position of Part Sales Manager in 2001 where she hit a glass ceiling and remained in that position for 3 years.

During the five years since she joined AutoZone, Ms. Juarez noticed that male employees were treated more favorably than female employees. In particular, less experienced male employees were promoted to vacant store manager positions and other promotions far more often than women, regardless of experience and knowledge. Although qualified for open store manager positions in her district, Ms. Juarez was frequently passed over for promotion in favor of less experienced and qualified male employees.

The practice of promoting male employees to better positions faster than female employees permeated AutoZone in the past. Most often women were relegated to service as delivery drivers. When possible, younger attractive women were sought for these positions to encourage predominantly male operated repair shops to place orders. Women at AutoZone have rarely been promoted beyond assistant store manager or part sales manager positions.

Unknown to the plaintiff, AutoZone's California operations were subject to a legal requirement that women were to be provided greater opportunity for employment and advancement. Senior managers were required to keep statistical records concerning the hiring and promotion of women. The requirement resulted from a gender discrimination claim brought against Chief Auto Parts. AutoZone acquired Chief after the legal requirement was imposed and was therefore obligated to comply until it expired sometime in 2004. After the legal requirement expired, a meeting was held to announce that statistics pertaining to women in the workplace no longer needed to be collected. A district manager who was present at the meeting testified about how AutoZone leaders celebrated in reaction to the announcement. According to the witness, who was then an AutoZone District Manager the Vice President of the Western Division said “we can finally start getting rid of these women.” Another corporate leader (who was later placed in charge of Plaintiff in San Diego) remarked that “women weren’t worth sh#t” to AutoZone. The same leader was also credited with telling a district manager that he needed to fire the women in his district stores if he hoped to be promoted to a regional manager himself.

In 2004, shortly after the end of the legal requirement expired, Plaintiff Ms. Juarez complained to upper management that she had been unfairly passed over for promotion to store manager. Ms. Juarez specifically asked if she would be required to file a lawsuit in order to get promoted. Shortly after complaining, Plaintiff was informed she would be put in a Store Manager Training program for several months. Male employees who worked for AutoZone did not have to go through this training program which was only required for store manager candidates who came from other companies. Plaintiff received no actual training in the program and continued to serve as an assistant manager for other stores in the San Diego Market. Eventually in October 2004, Plaintiff was given her first opportunity to serve as a store manager.

Plaintiff excelled in the Store Manager position and had a positive impact on her store's sales and appearance. At this time, her supervisor was a woman District Manager. After several months, Ms. Juarez was assigned a different district manager, a male, who was demeaning and condescending to Plaintiff and the other women in her store. Male employees in the store would receive pats on the back and jolly greetings, while Plaintiff and her female assistant manager were treated coldly by the district manager with little positive encouragement or interaction. Although Plaintiff's store was steadily improving in response to her efforts, the district manager would continuously comment that she could not handle the job.

In August 2005, Ms. Juarez became pregnant. At first she kept her condition secret for fear that the district manager would become more critical and upset. In late October 2005, Plaintiff received a favorable performance evaluation wherein she “met expectations” overall. However, the evaluation included multiple unfair comments. Although she was fearful of the consequences, Ms. Juarez felt that company rules required her to disclose her condition to the district manager. In early November 2005, Ms. Juarez told the district manager she was pregnant. The meeting was witnessed by two assistant managers who testified at trial. Upon hearing the news, the district manager became visibly upset. He sarcastically responded, "Congratulations....I guess." Later the district manager stated, "I feel sorry for you." Immediately after being informed Ms. Juarez was pregnant, the district manager became more aggressive, mean and critical of Ms. Juarez. Suddenly, nothing was being done correctly. Time-consuming work assignments had to be redone, even though no need for a redo existed. Before knowing of the pregnancy the district manager gave the store short “fix-it-lists” of approximately 15 items to be addressed. Afterward, the lists became several pages and sometimes containing as many as 70 nitpicking items. Yelling criticisms and public humiliation followed. The district manager repeatedly remarked in front of workers and customers that he did not believe Plaintiff could perform the work in her “condition” and told her to “step down.” Even though Plaintiff and her managers worked tirelessly, and often off the clock, to address the unwarranted “fix-it-lists,” Ms. Juarez was placed on a Performance Improvement Plan (PIP). At all times while on the PIP, Ms. Juarez and her sales team met or beat sales targets set by the company. Nevertheless, the company falsely claimed she failed to improve and meet expectations.

In February 2006, Ms. Juarez was demoted back to assistant manager and placed in a different store. Ms. Juarez lost her bonuses and overtime pay. She was replaced by a male store manager who was not given “fix-it-lists.” Ms. Juarez worked until she was nine months pregnant and then went out on maternity leave one week before the birth of her second child. While on leave in April 2006, Ms. Juarez filed a charge of gender and pregnancy discrimination with California Department of Fair Employment and Housing concerning her demotion from store manager. A key document in this case was a letter from AutoZone's legal department, called “AutoZoner Relations” to the California Department of Fair Employment and Housing in response to the discrimination complaint filed by Ms. Juarez. In a July 2006 letter, AutoZoner Relations claimed to have "thoroughly investigated" the claims of Ms. Juarez and found no problem. However, at trial evidence clearly demonstrated that AutoZoner Relations never spoke to any of the obvious witnesses to the conduct including Plaintiff and the people who worked with Plaintiff in her store.

Following her maternity leave, Ms. Juarez returned to her demoted position in 2007. While employed, Ms. Juarez filed a lawsuit in San Diego state court in January 2008, challenging her demotion as discrimination based on gender and pregnancy. She was deposed by AutoZone in October 2008, as part of her lawsuit. On November 20, 2008, Ms. Juarez was fired by AutoZone because she was allegedly not trustworthy. However, during discovery, AutoZone's person most knowledgeable witnesses indicated that the reasons for Plaintiff's termination were unknown. At trial, the witnesses “remembered” that the termination was probably related to an incident when loss prevention managers investigated a situation where another employee lost $400 cash while Plaintiff was in charge of the store. Alternatively, the company claimed that the termination may have been related to Plaintiff's refusal to fully cooperate in the $400 investigation by loss prevention.

During the course of litigation, AutoZone continued the date for trial because the company's loss prevention manager who investigated the missing $400 became pregnant. Months after the continuance, but before this trial, the company fired this loss prevention manager (while she was pregnant) for allegedly falsifying a store audit. The loss prevention manager testified to additional information not provided at the deposition she gave when still employed. According to the witness, the investigation into the missing $400 was requested by high level upper management. The investigation was prioritized over other incidents involving larger amounts of missing cash. She was specifically instructed to target Ms. Juarez rather than the subordinate employee who the loss prevention manager actually suspected to have lost the cash. Contrary to the allegations of the company, the loss prevention manager confirmed that Ms. Juarez acted appropriately during the investigation and answered all questions concerning the incident. The loss prevention manager stated she provided a detailed report to AutoZoner Relations immediately following the investigation which was never produced by the company and was not brought to trial.

When Ms. Juarez was suspended for the incident on the day of the investigation, the loss prevention manager suspected retaliation had occurred; unfortunately, she did not say so at her deposition under pressure from AutoZone's lawyers to say only what she knew for absolute certain and for fear of retaliation. Several former AutoZone employees testified about a pervasive fear of retaliation at the company. One of Ms. Juarez's assistant managers testified he was fired a few months after she was demoted in retaliation for supporting Ms. Juarez as a store manager.

Declarations submitted by the company in support of AutoZone's summary judgment motions indicated that “AutoZoner Relations” had recommended both the demotion and termination of Ms. Juarez. In closing argument, counsel for Ms. Juarez argued that the illegal demotion and termination were orchestrated and/or ratified by the company's legal department. AutoZone did not call a single woman employee to say she was fairly treated by the company.

AutoZone's attorneys strenuously argued that there was no evidence to support Plaintiff's claims. Further, AutoZone claimed that Plaintiff was a manipulative liar who used threats to receive promotions. In closing, AutoZone's lead trial counsel asked the jury to ignore the evidence about their own upper management's statements. Its counsel argued that the company had additional witnesses and documents to support its position, but the company did not want to waste the time presenting the information.

== Verdict ==
The verdict in favor of Plaintiff included $393,749.52 in past wages, $228,960 in future wages, and $250,000 for past emotional distress for garden variety emotional harm such as anger, anxiety, emotional distress, worry and the like. Plaintiff testified to the shame and embarrassment she felt after her demotion. At the time of her termination, she was a single mother caring for her two young children. During a lengthy period of unemployment, she and her children would make burritos and sell them just to make money to survive. Although Ms. Juarez eventually found new employment with a different auto parts company, the difference between the earnings and benefits resulted in significant financial losses. The ability to earn bonuses and overtime pay as a store manager at AutoZone as compared to jobs without such benefits supported future wage loss, even though gainfully employed at the time of trial. The jury deliberated for a day and a half before finding for Plaintiff on all claims asserted.

== Punitive damages phase ==
Following the liability phase, Plaintiff presented the testimony of an economist to assess the company's ability to pay punitive damages. Using AutoZone's public financial disclosures, it was established that the cash flow of the company, after all operational expenses, is $20,798,192 a week. Although on paper the company had a negative net worth of $1 billion, Plaintiff's economist explained the company's net worth is not a reliable indicator of the company's ability to pay because the excess cash was used to repurchase its stock, which had the effect of making outstanding shares more valuable. Plaintiff's economist further testified that AutoZone had the ability to pay a $100,000,000 punitive damage award after only four weeks of operations. Defendant's economist, who was unaware of the company's cash flow, testified about the company's negative net worth but offered no comment regarding what amount of punitive damages the company could pay.

In opposition to any award of punitive damages, the company offered the testimony of attorney Allison Smith, the director AutoZoner Relations from its headquarters in Memphis, TN. Ms. Smith testified that she had come from Memphis to tell the jury that the company had heard their verdict and would be examining its “processes.” Ms. Smith told the jury that she wanted to speak with the jury to hear why they had found liability. On cross-examination, Ms. Smith acknowledged that this case was not the first time a California jury had sent the company a message about “retaliation.” She acknowledged a prior 2010 verdict in Sacramento, where AutoZone fired a district manager for “falsifying an audit” after he reported that a human resources manager used the “N” word in reference to customers and employees of AutoZone. Ms. Smith was asked what AutoZone had done as a result of the 2010 jury finding and she responded that AutoZone had paid the judgment.

As to financial condition, Ms. Smith confirmed that the company's current public filing with the SEC reported that all pending litigation against the company “individually or in the aggregate” was “not material to the company’s financial condition.” This became a stipulated fact during the punitive damages phase of trial.

In the closing argument for punitive damages, Plaintiff's counsel argued that the reprehensibility of the conduct was extremely high because the unlawful acts were committed by the legal department which was responsible for guiding operations around the world. Counsel suggested that more than a hundred million dollars would be required to ensure that the board of directors took a hard look at their legal department and "clean house." Specifically, counsel suggested that the award should equate to one week of the company's extra cash for each year of injustice suffered by Plaintiff. Counsel expressed a hope that the verdict would come to be known as the “Juarez Award” which would stand for the proposition that women are an equal part of the workplace, that they have a right to work pregnant, and that retaliation will not be tolerated. In opposition, AutoZone argued that it had heard the message and no further punitive damages were required. The jury deliberated one day before reaching its punitive damage verdict.

== Trial counsel ==
Counsel for plaintiff:

- Lead Counsel Lawrance Bohm, Bohm Law Group
- Charles Moore, Law Offices of Charles Moore
- Kelsey Ciarimboli, Law Clerk, Bohm Law Group

Counsel for defense:

- Lead Counsel Nancy E. Pritikin, Littler Mendelson, P.C., San Francisco, CA
- Gregg Sindici, Littler Mendelson, P.C., San Diego, CA
- Liliya Stanik, Littler Mendelson, P.C., San Diego, CA
