= Mercy San Juan Medical Center =

Coordinates: 38.668212°N 121.313213°W

- Dignity Health
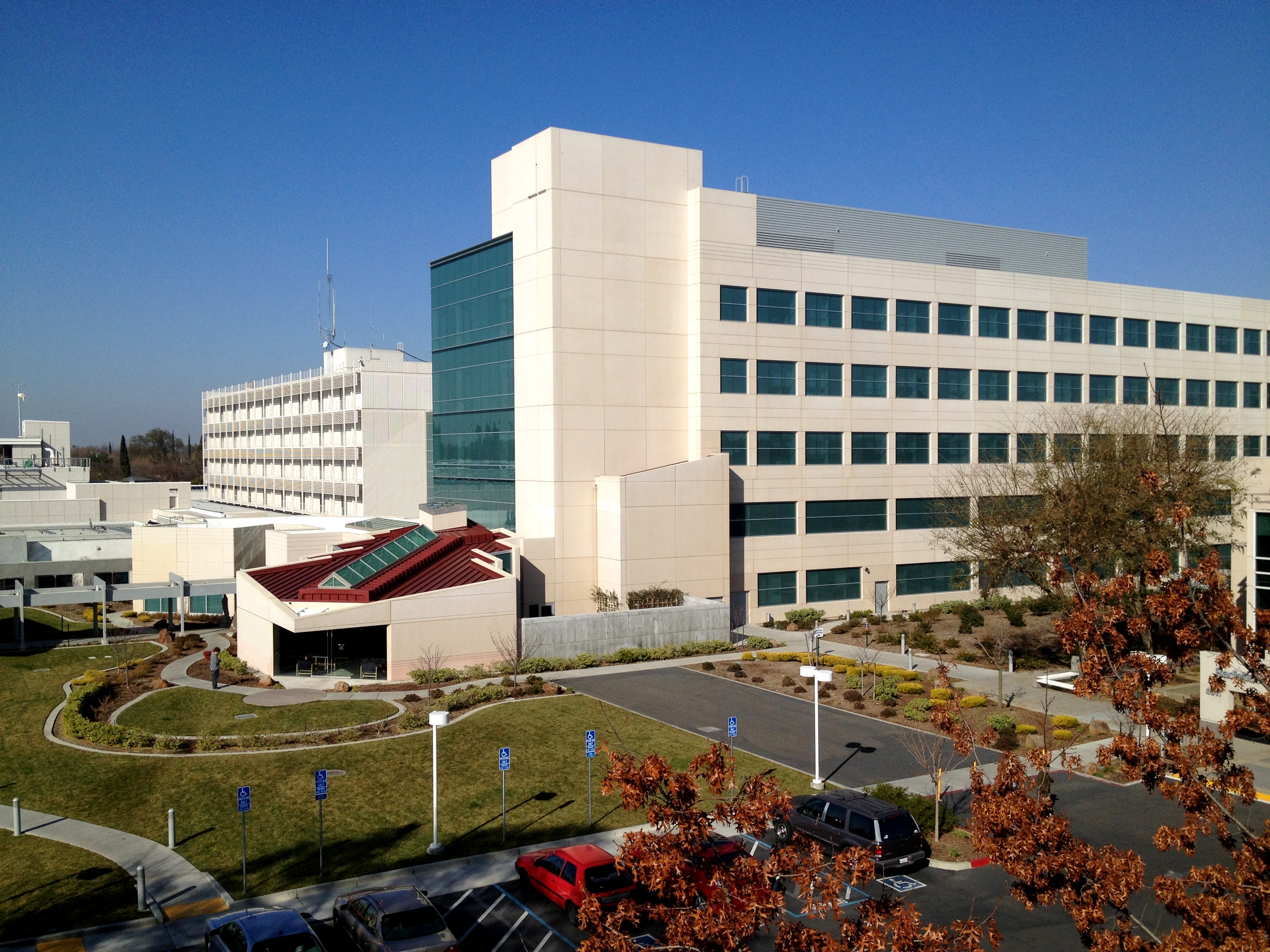

Geography
- Location: 6501 Coyle Avenue, Carmichael, CA 95608, Carmichael, California, United States

Organization
- Care system: Private
- Type: Community
- Affiliated university: Dignity Health

Services
- Emergency department: Level II trauma center
- Beds: 370

History
- Founded: 1967

Links
- Lists: Hospitals in California

Mercy San Juan Medical Center is a not-for-profit hospital located in Carmichael, California serving the areas of north Sacramento County and south Placer County. It is home to Sacramento's first Comprehensive Stroke Center.

== History ==
A six-story patient tower opened in December 2009, adding 110 beds.
