= China Basin Landing =

Office complex in San Francisco, California, United States

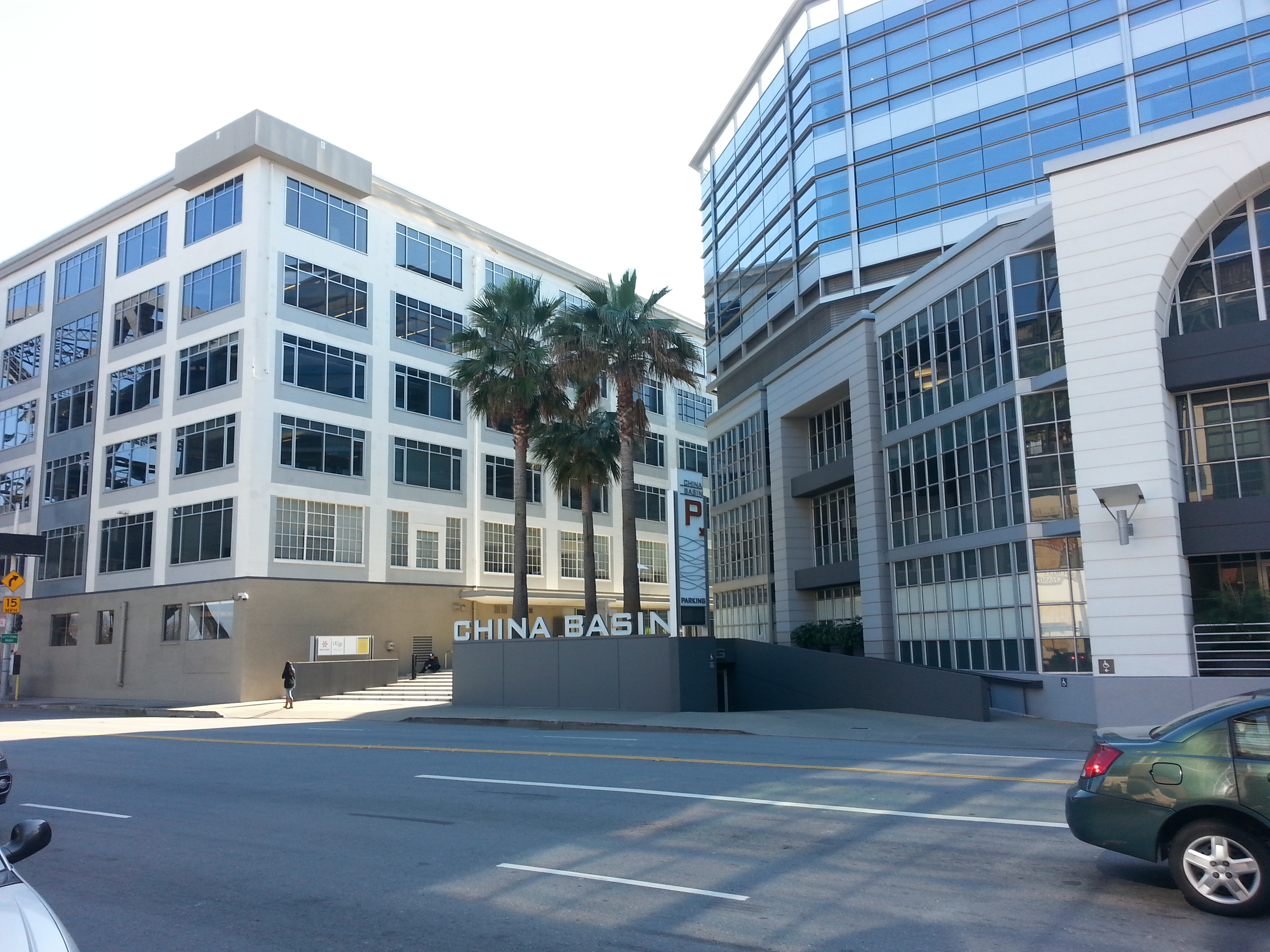
- China Basin Landing on Third Street

- Location within San Francisco Location within California Location within the United States

General information
- Location: 185 Berry Street, San Francisco, California
- Coordinates: 37.776348°N 122.391839°W
- Owner: McCarthy Cook & Co

Technical details
- Size: 902,000 square feet (83,800 m^{2})

China Basin Landing, now referred to as simply China Basin, is an office complex on the border of the South of Market (SoMa) and Mission Bay areas of San Francisco, California. The complex has 917,000 square feet (85,200 m^{2}) of space. It is the headquarters of Lyft and Dignity Health.

== History ==
M. Larry Lawrence, a developer from San Diego, California, purchased the site of the China Basin Landing building in 1982. The site had a 465,000-square-foot (43,200 m^{2}) six story existing structure, the China Basin Building, dating back to the 1920s or earlier. Lawrence spent $40 million to renovate the older building and build a new three story, 207,000 square feet (19,200 m^{2}) office facility next to the existing structure. The new office building, which opened in 1991, was the final major office building in San Francisco to open during that year.

As an office facility, a portion originally it had three stories, while another portion had six stories. The entire facility had a total of 725,000 square feet (67,400 m^{2}) of space. At one point the building was converted from warehouses to offices. A parking garage was established so the building owners could get a variance that permitted them to convert the building to offices.

In 1998, Blackstone Group owned the building.

The California Public Employees' Retirement System (CalPERS) bought China Basin Landing in 2005 for $260 million.

Hellmuth, Obata and Kassabaum (HOK) San Francisco designed a two-story expansion on top of the existing 1991 section of the China Basin Landing facility.

In 2011, Dropbox announced that it would take the fourth floor with an option for the fifth, and the center became 91% leased.

McCarthy Cook & Co currently own and manage the property.

== Location ==
China Basin Landing is located on one city block bounded by 3rd Street, 4th Street, Berry Street, and the China Basin Canal. It is across from AT&T Park and it overlooks McCovey Cove.

China Landing is one block from the Caltrain depot. It is about .5 miles (0.80 km) from the University of California San Francisco Mission Bay campus.

The building is close to public rail links that connect the facility to the University of California Berkeley and Stanford University. China Basin also has access to the Muni Metro N and T lines and the bus lines 10, 30, 45, and 47. A China Basin Landing shuttle service, which has no charge, connects China Basin Landing to the Financial District, the Ferry Building, and the Bay Area Rapid Transit Embarcadero Station. A UCSF shuttle service also serves the building.

== Facilities ==
Most of the facilities within China Basin Landing are offices. The complex has a parking garage which, as of 1999, has 600 spaces.

== Tenants ==
=== Academic facilities ===
The China Basin Location of the University of California San Francisco Department of Epidemiology and Biostatistics is located in the building The UCSF Imaging Center at China Basin, of the Department of Radiology and Biomedical Imaging, is located in the building.

=== Offices ===
Up until 2015, Dropbox had its corporate headquarters in building. Dignity Health and Synopsys, among many other tenants, are in the building. Lyft also has its corporate headquarters in the building.

=== Former tenants ===
When Sirna Therapeutics was located at China Basin Landing, it occupied Suite 6504. Previously the Public Library of Science was located in Suite 3100. In June 2010, PLoS announced that it was moving to a new location. The SF Weekly previously occupied space in Suite 3800 The newspaper is now in a different location. KEST AM 1450, a radio station, as of 1998 had offices at China Basin landing. The radio station is now located in another facility. Department of Rehabilitation had an office in the past.
