= Southern Nevada =

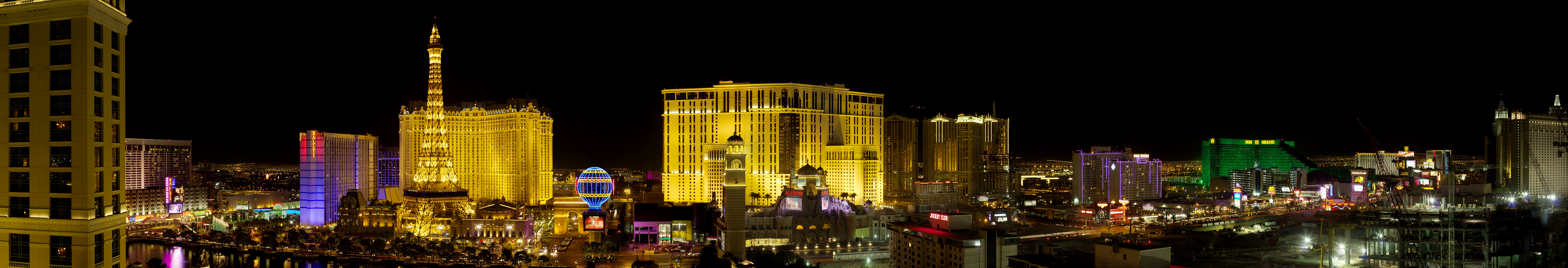
- The largest of Southern Nevada's casinos are located on the Las Vegas Strip, here pictured in 2007.

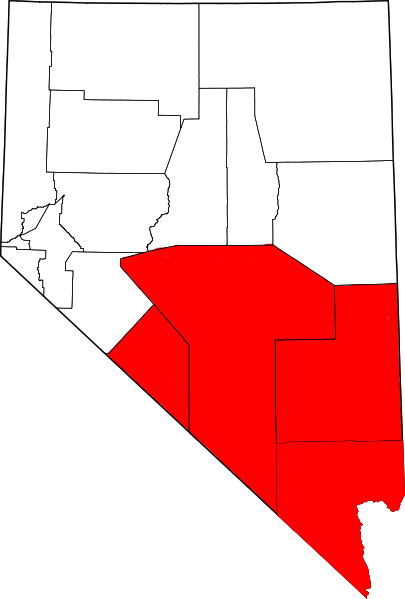
- The counties most commonly associated with Southern Nevada with Mineral County not shown in red
- Country: United States
- State: Nevada
- Counties: Clark; Esmeralda; Lincoln; Mineral; Nye
- Largest city: Las Vegas

Southern Nevada (SNV) is a region and the southern portion of the U.S. state of Nevada which includes the Las Vegas Valley. It also includes the areas in and around Pahrump and Pioche. Tonopah and Hawthorne are sometimes also referred to as part of Southern Nevada, but all organizations based in the Las Vegas area, such as the Southern Nevada Health District, effectively limit the term to the Las Vegas Valley.

Geographically, parts of Southern Nevada are within the Mojave Desert. The population of the region, as measured by the 2020 U.S. Census, is 2,327,680, with 2,265,461 living in the Las Vegas Valley (i.e., Clark County). Over time and influenced by climate change, droughts in Southern Nevada have been increasing in frequency and severity, putting a further strain on Las Vegas's and Southern Nevada's water security.

== Economy ==
The primary drivers of the Southern Nevada economy have been the confluence of tourism, gaming and conventions which in turn feed the retail and dining industries. Las Vegas serves as world headquarters for the world's largest Fortune 500 gaming company, MGM Resorts International.

Tourism also benefits the areas around Pahrump, which has served as a bedroom community of Las Vegas. Prostitution is also legal in areas of Southern Nevada, outside of Clark County.

== Topography ==
The Mojave Desert and Great Basin Desert cover all or most of Southern Nevada. Man-made lakes, seasonal, and dry lakes periodically dot the landscape. Examples of these are Lake Mead, Lake Las Vegas and the Ivanpah Dry Lake.
