= Alejandra Lillo =

American designer (born 1972)

M. Alejandra Lillo
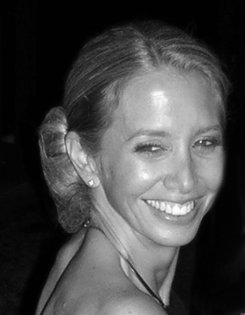
- Born: September 15, 1972 (age 54); United States
- Education: • Universidad Mendoza Facultad de Arquitectura y Urbanismo • University of California, Los Angeles
- Occupation: Architect
- Awards: • 2010 Hospitality Design Magazine, Influential Women in Hospitality Design • 2010 Contract Magazine: Designer of the Year • 2008 D&AD Yellow Pencil Winner • 2007 "The Boutique 18" Young Designer Award, Boutique Design Magazine
- Practice: Undisclosable
- Projects: • Untitled • W New York Downtown Hotel and Residences • CityCenter's Aria

Alejandra Lillo (born September 15, 1972) is an American designer.

== Early life, education and early career ==
Alejandra was born in Buffalo, New York to Dr. Jose and Elvira Lillo, where she lived until the age of two. Her family moved to Rock Island, Illinois where Alejandra attended Rivermont Collegiate, known then as St. Katharine's St. Mark's Independent College Preparatory School, until 1981. The Lillo family moved to Irvine, California in 1981 where Alejandra continued her grade school education at St. Cecilia School. She attended Irvine High School, graduating in 1990. Shortly thereafter, in 1991, the Lillo family moved to Mendoza, Argentina where Alejandra developed interest in architecture and design, leading to her matriculation into the University of Mendoza's Facultad de Arquitectura y Urbanismo, receiving her first professional degree as well as her Architecture License in 2001.

In 2003, she pursued her second professional degree at the School of Architecture and Urban Design at the University of California, Los Angeles, located in Los Angeles, California, graduating in 2004.

== Career ==
Her architectural career began at Corbett Cibinel Architects in 2001, where she focused upon healthcare and educational design.

Alejandra joined Graft, an architectural firm located in Los Angeles, as a lead designer and project manager in 2004. In 2007, she was promoted to a managing partner and the chief executive officer of the company where she led the Los Angeles office until March 2011. During her tenure, Graft aggressively participated in philanthropic enterprises, including Brad Pitt's Make It Right Foundation New Orleans (MIR) with William McDonough + Partners, and Cherokee. MIR work was the centerpiece of the 2009 Clinton Global Initiative.

In February 2011, Lillo co-founded Los Angeles-based design firm Undisclosable. At Undisclosable, she completed architectural work for Jonathan Glazer and J. Spaceman's Untitled: A physical manifestation of “Ladies and Gentlemen, We Are Floating in Space" presented by The Creators Project (a partnership with Intel and Vice) at Coachella in April 2011 and in Brooklyn that October.

She has spearheaded architectural, interior, and product design solutions for a wide variety of project types, including healthcare, commercial, residential, cultural, and hospitality; as well as at a variety of scales, from the single-family home to multi-use towers and large scale master plans, maintaining a flexible and often cross-disciplinary attitude in order to create progressive, nimble solutions within a rapidly changing world. These designs espouse the belief in enriching spaces through combining seemingly disparate elements, whether they pertain to the narrative sequences contained within a building, geometry, or materiality.

== Work ==
- Bucato (2013), Los Angeles, California
- Paramnesia House (2012), Los Angeles, California
- Float (2012), San Diego, California
- Epicurean (2012), San Diego, California
- Untitled: A physical manifestation of “Ladies and Gentlemen, We Are Floating in Space” (2011), Coachella Valley Music and Arts Festival, Indio, California
- 2011 Toyota Camry digital set
- Citizen Watches commercial set
- Paramus Surgical Center & Anti-Aging Clinic Paramus, New Jersey
- 2010 CISCO Virtual Sales Meeting digital set
- MIR Newark Newark, New Jersey
- MIR NOLA (ongoing) New Orleans, Louisiana
- Masterplan of Yantai Qinghua Science and Technology Park (2010), YEDA Yantai, China
- AO Project (2009) Tokyo, Japan
- MIR NOLA Camelback (2009), New Orleans, Louisiana
- W New York Downtown Hotel and Residences (2009), New York City, New York
- Aria Poolscape Restaurant and Bars (2009), City Center, Paradise, Nevada
- Kanera (2009)
- The Pink Project (2008), New Orleans, Louisiana
- Panorama Tower 3 (2008), Paradise, Nevada
- Brand Restaurant (2008), Monte Carlo Resort and Casino, Paradise, Nevada
- DC Melrose Store (2008), Los Angeles, California United States
- Panorama Towers 1+2 (2007), Paradise, Nevada
- Samana Luxury Resort (2006), Samaná Province
- Moonraker (2006), Chatsworth, California
- DC Shoes Concept Store (2006), Soho, New York City, New York
- Water Cay Resort (2006), Turks and Caicos Islands, British Overseas Territory
- Sci-Fi Exhibition Stand (2005), San Diego Comic-Con, San Diego, California
- Stack Restaurant (2005), Mirage Casino and Hotel, Paradise, Nevada
- Red River College (2003), Winnipeg, Manitoba, Canada

== Organizations ==
- Savannah College of Art and Design Academic Advisory Board Member
- BMW Stiftung Herbert Quandt – Young Leaders Alumni
- Associated Member American Institute of Architects
- Colegio de Arquitectos, Mendoza Argentina

== Publications ==
- Contributing writer for Architecture in Times of Need. Prestel. 2009.

== Speaking engagements ==
2013

- (October 31, November 1–2) 13th Annual Mexico ENADII, Mexico City, Mexico
- (April 3) BDWest Power Players: Women Leaders in Hospitality Panel Discussion
- (February 6) AIA Kansas City Cocktails & Conversations, Guest Speaker

2011

- "Women in Architecture and Design" (June 17–19) 7th International Architecture & Design Congress, Universidad de Mendoza
- "Digital Fabrication in Architecture" (May 16) Universidad Francisco Marroquín, Facultad de Arquitectura, Guatemala
- "MIR – Architecture in Times of Need" (February 16) Rice Design Alliance, The Museum of Fine Arts, Houston, Texas

2010

- "Graft-ing Methodology" (November 2–5) 10th Annual Mexico ENADII, Mexico City, Mexico
- "Emotive and Experiential Design in Architecture" (October 7) Design & Health Europe 2010 International Symposium, Brussels, Belgium
- "Environmentally Responsible Resort Development" (September 23–29) Al Hoceima, Morocco
- "Branding and Interior Architecture" (September 2) Florida International University, Miami, Florida
- "Enhancing Social Cohesion in Urban Development" (August 26–29) 15th Transatlantic Forum, BMW, New York City, New York
- "New Perspectives on Health Care Design" (June 7–8) Design & Health Canada 2010, Toronto, Ontario, Canada
- "What is Graft?" (March 30) Savannah College of Art and Design, Savannah, Georgia
- "Regionalism and A Hays Town Symposium" (March 26) University of Lafayette, Louisiana
- "Will Design and Architecture Help Haiti Rise Again?" (January 19) KCRW Design and Architecture

2009

- "Alternative Technologies: New Homes for New Orleans, a Social Challenge" (April 16) Gulf Coast Green, Houston, Texas
- "The New International Style: Boutique Design in Hospitality" (June 15–16) NeoCon World Trade Fair 2009, Chicago, Illinois
- "Morality and Architecture" (June 27) Mobius LA 2009, Los Angeles, California
- "La Complejidad en la Arquitectura" (October 21) CiaBX 2009 University De La Salle Bajio, León, Guanajuato, Mexico

2008

- "Opening Discussion Panel" (August 11) Venice Biennale of Architecture 2008, BDA, German Pavilion, Venice, Italy
- "Building a Global Boutique" (October 15–18) Mobius LA, AIA convention, Los Angeles, California
- "Sustainable Dialogues III: Design + Implementation" (June 28) A+D Museum, Los Angeles, California
- "Single Family Dwellings: Green within Reason" (April 24) DWELL on Design, Los Angeles, California
- "Make It Right: Rebuilding New Orleans’ (May 11–13) Lower Ninth Ward" National Green Building Conference, New Orleans, Louisiana

2007

- "The Serious Business of Designing Toys" (December 18) KCRW Design and Architecture
- "Building Value through Non-traditional Construction Techniques" (October 15) Korner Studio, Pasadena City College, California
- "What is Graft?" (February 26) Hospitality Design, Las Vegas, Nevada
- "Graft" (April 23) Woodbury University, Los Angeles, California

2006

- "Stack: Building Value through Non-traditional Construction" (February 20) UCLA guest speaker, Mark Mack graduate seminar, Los Angeles, California

2005

- "Trend Research: Designing life sets for 2020" (March 18) Moonraker, Volkswagen, Chatsworth, California

== See also ==
- List of people from Los Angeles
- List of University of California, Los Angeles people
