= Graft (architects) =

Architectural firm

Practice information
- Key architects: Gregor Hoheisel; Lars Krückeberg; Wolfram Putz; Thomas Willemeit
- Founded: 1998
- Location: Beijing; Berlin

Significant works and honors
- Buildings: Hotel Q The Emperor Hotel; MIR NOLA Shotgun
- Projects: The Pink Project
- Design: Kanera 1E

Graft (stylised as GRAFT) is a design studio conceived as a ‘label’ for architecture, urban planning, exhibition design, music and the "pursuit of happiness". Graft was founded in 1998 in Los Angeles, California by Lars Krückeberg, Wolfram Putz and Thomas Willemeit and headed by partner Alejandra Lillo from 2007 until early 2011. A second Graft office was opened 2001 in Berlin, followed by a third office in Beijing in 2004, which is headed by founding partner Gregor Hoheisel.

== Company history and statement of intent ==
The name Graft was derived from the terminology of botany, the grafting of one shoot onto another genetically different host. The practice believed that the traditional boundaries of architecture needed to be questioned, as it continually changes when it engages with global and local environments.

== Selected projects ==
=== Current ===
- MIR NOLA Shotgun, New Orleans, Louisiana United States
- Qinhuangdao Hotel & Residences, China

=== Recently completed ===
- 2010 KU 64 Children's Dental Clinic, Berlin, Germany
- 2010 Dalian Daily Towers, Dalian, China
- 2010 Sichuan Airlines VIP Lobby, Beijing, China
- 2010 Studio Simmen, Berlin, Germany
- 2009 AO Project, Tokyo, Japan
- 2009 Boulevard of the Stars, Berlin, Germany
- 2009 MIR NOLA Camelback, New Orleans, Louisiana United States
- 2009 W New York Downtown Hotel and Residences, New York City, New York United States
- 2009 Poolscape Restaurant and Bars, City Center, Las Vegas, Nevada United States
- 2009 Residential Commune, Tbilisi, Georgia
- 2009 Hotel Iveria Tbilisi, Georgia
- 2009 Lakeside Villa, Berlin, Germany
- 2009 Platoon Kunsthall, Seoul, South Korea
- 2009 Loft Kullman, Hamburg, Germany
- 2009 Kanera 1D, 1E, 1H, 1X
- 2008 KU 64 Dental Clinic, Berlin, Germany
- 2008 Sakanela Urban Development, Tbilisi, Georgia
- 2008 The Pink Project, New Orleans, Louisiana United States
- 2008 Gongti F+B Club, Beijing, China
- 2008 Ao-Di Next Gene 20 Villa, Taiwan
- 2008 Tsinandali Winery & Hotel, Georgia
- 2008 Bird Island Villas, Kuala Lumpur, Malaysia
- 2008 Hausvogteiplatz, Berlin, Germany
- 2008 Gongti Hotel, Beijing, China
- 2008 Panorama Tower 3, Las Vegas, Nevada United States
- 2008 Germany Unity Flag, nomadic
- 2008 Kinderdentist Dr. med. dent. Mokabberi, Berlin, Germany
- 2008 Gingko Bacchus Restaurant, Chengdou, China
- 2008 The Emperor Hotel, Beijing, China
- 2008 Brand, Monte Carlo Resort and Casino, Las Vegas, Nevada United States
- 2008 DC Melrose Store, Los Angeles, California United States
- 2008 Dental Lounge, Düsseldorf, Germany
- 2007 Panorama Towers 1+2, Las Vegas, Nevada United States
- 2007 Opticon Flagship Store, Hamburg, Germany
- 2007 Eric Paris Salon, Beijing, China
- 2006 Riga Treehouses, Vecaki, Latvia

== Awards and prizes ==
=== 2013 ===
- Design Award of the Association of German Architects, awarded for Graft's KU 64 Children's Dental Clinic

=== 2011 ===
- European Prize for Architecture, awarded for Graft's Pink Project and humanitarian concerns

=== 2010 ===
- Contract Magazine's 2010 Designers of the Year

=== 2009 ===
- Boulevard der Stars competition, 1st place
- Columbiaquartier competition, 2nd place
- Kanera 1D, Steel Innovation Prize
- The Pink Project, Gold, Design Award of the Federal Republic of Germany
- Thermopal Designers Collection, Red Dot Design Award
- Thermopal Designers Collection, nominee, Design Award of the Federal Republic of Germany
- 2009 American Architecture Awards, Make It Right Shotgun House
- Gingko Bacchus, Award of Merit, Illumination Awards

=== 2008 ===
- Archip, Public Interior/Innovation, highest award for the Interior Design of KU64
- Bird Island competition, finalist
- The Emperor Hotel, finalist, Best of Year, Hospitality/Hotel/International, Interior Design Awards
- The Emperor Hotel, finalist, Best Hotel Design and Best Guest Room, Gold Key Awards
- Eric Paris Salon, honorable mention, Best New Retail Store, 5,000 sq ft (460 m^{2}) or more, SADI Award
- Graftworld, finalist, Innovation, 6th Saint-Gobain Gypsum International Trophy
- Kanera 1E, Red Dot Design Award
- Kanera 1E, nominee, Design Award of the Federal Republic of Germany
- Kinderdentist, Best of Year finalist, Healthcare, Interior Design Awards
- Opticon, Grand SADI Award
- The Pink Project, Yellow Pencil, Environmental Design/Installations, D&AD Awards
- The Pink Project, Exhibit, Best of Year, Interior Design Awards
- The Pink Project, shortlist, Gute Gestaltung, Deutscher Designer Club
- The Pink Project, selected for German Pavilion, XI Venice Biennale of Architecture
- Studio Jeanot Simmen competition, 1st place

=== 2007 ===
- Dalian Daily competition, 1st prize
- Eric Paris Salon, finalist, Best of Year, Interior Design Awards
- Graftworld, 1st Place, Innovation, The Rigips Trophy
- Hotel Q, Bar Design of the Year, Mixology Awards
- Mercedes Benz&Maybach Trade Fair Booth, finalist, Design Award of the Federal Republic of Germany
- Samana Luxury Resort, Best Unbuilt Project, Hospitality Design Awards
- Sci-Fi, Gold Medal, 20th Annual Exhibit Design Award

=== 2006 ===
- nominee, Iakov Chernikov International Prize for Young Architects
- HEWI Modular Wall, finalist, Best of Year, Interior Design Awards
- Hotel Q, True Stylish Hotel award, World Hotel Award
- Mercedes Benz & Maybach Trade Fair Booth AMI 2006, Award der ausgezeichneten Messeauftritte, Category XL, ADAM Silber Award
- Moonraker, finalist, Best of Year, Interior Design Awards
- Sci-Fi, Gold Medal, 20th Annual Exhibit Design Award
- STACK, Best Dramatic Space, Boutique Design Award
- STACK, finalist, Gold Key Award
- STACK, People's Choice Award (and finalist), Restaurant Design Award, AIA LA
- STACK, finalist, Fine Dining, Hospitality Design Restaurant Award
- STACK, shortlist, Hotel/Restaurant, contractworld Award
- STACK, Best New Restaurant, Las Vegas Weekly Readers' Choice Awards

=== 2005 ===
- FIX, finalist, Restaurant Design Award, AIA LA
- Hotel Q, Hospitality Design Award
- Hotel Q, Travel and Leisure Award
- Hotel Q, Best of Category, Floor Coverings, contractworld Award
- Hotel Q, ArTravel Award
- Panorama Towers, Unbuilt Category, AIA NV Design Awards
- Wave of the Future Award

=== 2004 ===
- Hotel Q, Auszeichnung, Hans Schaefers Preis
- Hotel Q, Honor Award, AIA LA
- Neue Sentimental Film Headquarters, 2nd Prize, contractworld Award
- Panorama Towers, Unbuilt Category, AIA NV Design Awards

=== 2003 ===
- Zeal Pictures Office, 2nd Prize, Best Office, Femb Award
- Zeal Pictures Office, European Design Awards

== Exhibitions ==
- Graftworld- Scenographic Architecture at AEDES, Berlin January–February 2007
- After the Flood: Building on Higher Ground at A+D Museum: Los Angeles April–July 2008. Featuring Make it Right and Pink Project
- Unbuilding Walls at the Venice Biennale of Architecture, 2018

== Publications ==
- Architecture in Times of Need, Kristin Feireiss, Publisher Prestel, 2009
- Hatch: the New Architectural Generation, Kieran Long, Laurence King Publishers, 2008, ISBN 978-1-85669-562-6
- Graftworld Aedes Exhibition, Published by Aedes, ISBN 3-937093-76-1
