= The Martin =

Condominium tower in Las Vegas

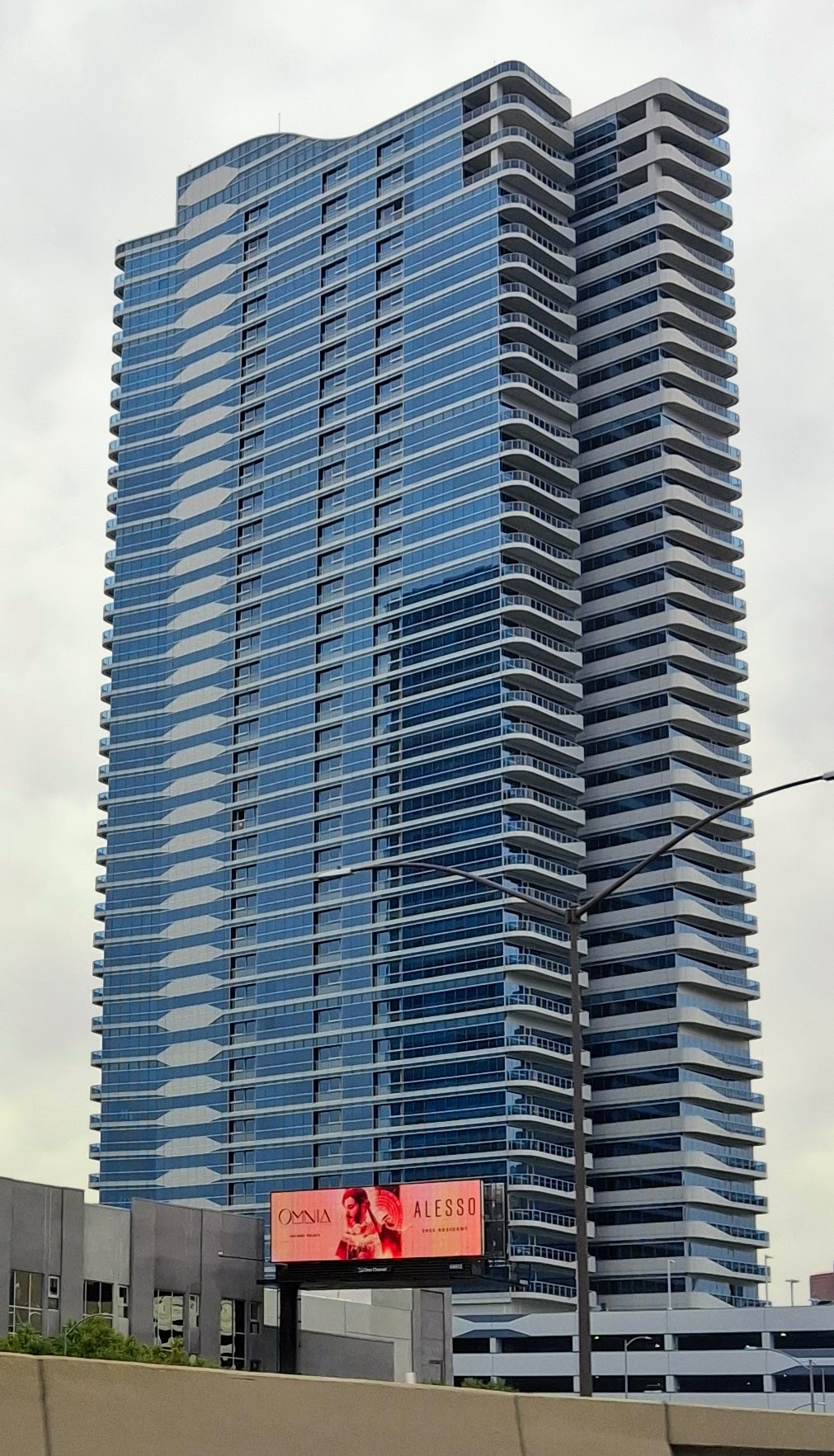
- The Martin viewed from I-15, December 2025.
- Interactive map of the The Martin area
- Former names: Panorama Tower North

General information
- Status: Completed
- Type: Luxury high-rise condominium complex
- Location: 4471 Dean Martin Drive; Las Vegas, Nevada
- Coordinates: 36.108633°N 115.182362°W
- Groundbreaking: April 21, 2006
- Opening: 2008
- Owner: Panorama Towers HOA
- Management: RMI Management, LLC

Height
- Height: 500 ft (150 m)

Technical details
- Floor count: 45

Design and construction
- Architect: Klai Juba Architects
- Structural engineer: Lochsa Engineering
- Main contractor: M.J. Dean Construction, Inc

Other information
- Number of units: 372

Website
- www.themartin.com

The Martin is a luxury high-rise condominium tower located at 4471 Dean Martin Drive in Paradise, Nevada, near the Las Vegas Strip. The tower was originally part of the Panorama Towers complex, and was initially known as Panorama Tower North.

Groundbreaking took place in April 2006. The tower suffered from poor sales after its opening in 2008, and subsequently entered foreclosure. In 2011, the tower was renamed as The Martin, after Dean Martin, and was given a $3 million renovation which led to an increase in sales. The Martin is located across Interstate 15 from CityCenter. The building is 500 feet (150 m) tall, and has 45 floors and 372 total units.

== History ==
In September 2004, a 35-story third tower, standing 500 feet tall, was approved by Clark County to become part of the Panorama Towers property, which was being developed by Andrew Sasson and Laurence Hallier. At that time, the third tower was planned to be slightly smaller than the other two towers, with only 250 units compared to 350 for the others. The project's second tower was scheduled to begin construction in January 2005, with construction on the third tower scheduled to begin six months later.

A groundbreaking ceremony for the third tower was held on April 21, 2006. Pamela Anderson appeared at the event as Hallier's date. Other attendees included Steve Wynn, Ryan Seacrest, and Mickey Rourke. Taylor International was the general contractor for the tower, which was constructed north of Harmon Avenue and the project's two previous towers.

Panorama Tower North opened in 2008, with 45 stories and 372 units. After its opening, the tower struggled with sales, as many units entered foreclosure or became short sales. In November 2008, istar Financial, the tower's construction lender, foreclosed on the property. In 2009, iStar acquired the property out of foreclosure.

In January 2011, Panorama North was renamed The Martin as part of a marketing strategy to increase sales in the tower. The Martin was named after Dean Martin. A renovation of the tower was scheduled to begin in mid-September 2011. Improvements totaling $3 million were made to the tower, including a redesigned lobby with a library, and lounges at the pool. The renovation also included new landscaping and the addition of vintage furniture and retro décor, as well as residential services such as concierge, car service, continental breakfast and room-cleaning. Renovations concluded in March 2012. Monthly sales subsequently increased, with strong sales occurring throughout 2012 and 2013.

== See also ==
- List of tallest buildings in Las Vegas
