= Turnberry Towers =

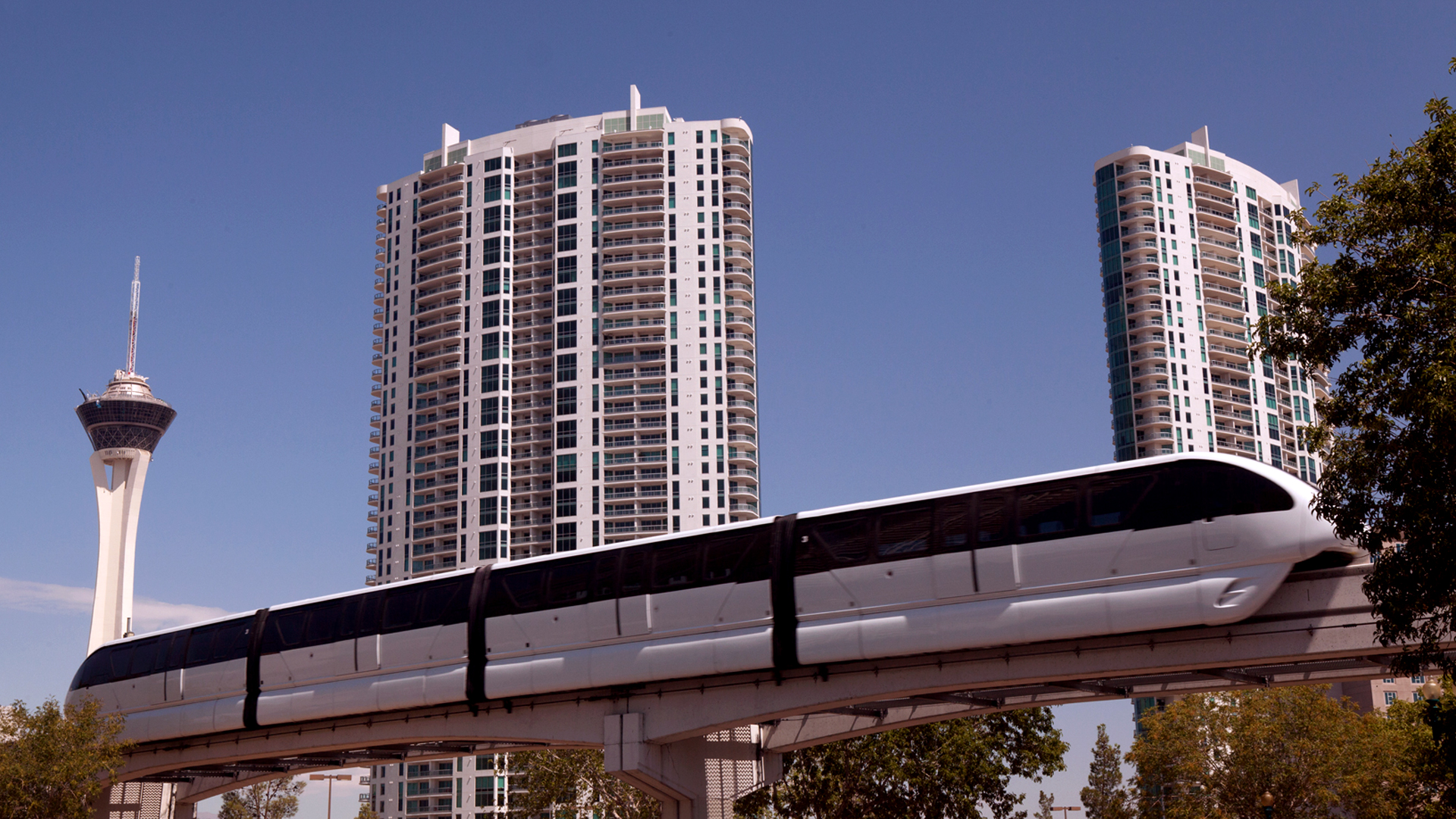
- Turnberry Towers
- Interactive map of the Turnberry Towers area

General information
- Type: Residential
- Location: Winchester, Nevada, 222 Karen Avenue (West tower), 232 Karen Avenue (East tower)
- Coordinates: 36°8′27″N 115°9′11″W
- Construction started: June 2005 (East Tower)
- Completed: May/June 2007 (East Tower); 2008 (West Tower)
- Opening: July 2007

Height
- Height: 453 ft (138 m)

Technical details
- Floor count: 45

Design and construction
- Architecture firm: Robert M. Swedroe Architecture
- Developer: Turnberry Associates
- Main contractor: Turnberry Place Construction

Other information
- Number of rooms: 636

Website
- www.turnberrytowers.com

Turnberry Towers is a 45-story twin tower condominium complex in Winchester, Nevada, near the Las Vegas Strip. Initially, plans were announced in 1998 for Great Masters, a $300 million condominium project consisting of 56-story twin towers. The land was sold in 2000 to Turnberry Associates, which announced plans to build Madison Towers on the property. The $250 million condominium project would include 25-story twin towers, but the start of construction was delayed due to poor economic conditions as a result of the September 11 attacks. Conditions improved and the project was redesigned to be larger, with the new name of Turnberry Towers. Construction of the first tower began in June 2005, and was finished in 2007, followed by the completion of the second tower a year later.

== History ==
=== Initial plans ===
In November 1998, high-rise developer Bruce Stark and his Hawaii-based company, Stark Properties, announced plans to build Great Masters, a 56-story twin-tower condominium project with 592 units. The project would cost $300 million, with an estimated sales value of $500 million. The project would be built on 10 acres (4.0 ha) situated at Paradise Road and Karen Avenue, behind the Sahara hotel-casino that was located on the Las Vegas Strip. Construction was expected to begin in August 1999. Stark was not concerned about competition from Park Towers or the nearby Turnberry Place. Great Masters and Turnberry Place were among the largest condominium projects proposed for the Las Vegas Valley at that time, and Great Masters would be the tallest entirely residential building in the United States, standing at 724 feet (221 m).

In early 2000, Stark Properties sold the land for $13.5 million to Turnberry Associates. In June 2000, Turnberry announced plans for Madison Towers, a $250 million gated condominium complex consisting of two 25-story towers that would be built on the land. Madison Towers would offer smaller condominium units at a lower price compared to the company's Turnberry Place property. The project was still in the final design stages at the time of announcement, with construction expected to begin in spring 2001. The first tower was expected to open in summer 2002. In early 2002, the project was put on hold for 12 to 18 months following decreased sales, the result of poor economic conditions caused by the September 11 attacks. As of June 2002, the project was being redesigned for a reduction in size, from 600 units to 450, with the potential to begin construction at the end of the year.

Improvements in the economy led Turnberry to increase the size of the project prior to construction. By July 2004, Madison Towers consisted of two 40-story towers, with plans to open a sales center on the site later that year. In addition to the size increase, the project was renamed Turnberry Towers later that year. The project was designed by Robert M. Swedroe Architects. In March 2005, Turnberry stated that the project would consist of two 45-story towers with a total of 636 units. Sales were expected to begin that month, with construction scheduled to begin within 30 days. The first tower was scheduled for completion in early 2007. In April 2005, a lawsuit was filed by a buyer who purchased a unit in the original Madison Towers project four years earlier. The buyer alleged that Turnberry would not honor his contract for a unit that would now cost more money as a result of the design change.

=== Construction ===
Construction of the first tower began in June 2005, with nearly all of its 316 units sold up to that time; the second tower was approximately half sold. Condominium prices started around $500,000, with an average cost of $750,000. The project was expected to cost $500 million. The first tower was scheduled for completion in June 2007, while construction of the second tower was to begin in summer 2006. Turnberry Place Construction was the general contractor. In October 2005, seven construction workers were injured when sections of the second floor collapsed. In March 2006, excavation was underway to prepare for the construction of the second tower.

During 2006, the project received a construction loan for $360 million that was funded by several banks, including Prudential Insurance Company of America. The East Tower was topped off in October 2006. As of February 2007, the second tower had been built up to the 34th floor, with 125 units left for sale. Many buyers were second-home owners and were from southern California. Approximately 800 construction workers were on the site every day. The first tower was scheduled to receive its certificate of occupancy in early June 2007. Both towers were to include their own pools and 2,500 sq ft (230 m^{2}) fitness centers. The East Tower neared completion in May 2007, and was finished by the following month, with the first residents expected to move in during July 2007. The West Tower was topped off in June 2007, and was completed in 2008. Both of the 45-story towers contain 318 units each. The towers stand 453 feet (138 m).

=== Operation ===
By 2009, the property had begun renting out units that remained unsold as a result of the Great Recession. Early that year, Prudential took over the project by paying $164 million to prevent it from defaulting on the $360 million construction loan. That year, Prudential sued Turnberry for failure to pay $10 million on the construction loan. Prudential also alleged that Turnberry wrongfully diverted $12 million in condominium revenues to pay for expenses not in the initial budget, rather than using the funds to pay off the loan. Prudential also stated that it had to cover the costs of liens, taxes, and other expenses that were to be handled by Turnberry. Additionally, Prudential accused Turnberry of failure to provide purchase deposit refunds for customers totaling $4.2 million.

In 2011, real estate investor CIM Group purchased the remaining 279 unsold units at a price of $48.3 million. The East Tower contained 39 unsold units, while the second tower contained 240.

== See also ==
- List of tallest buildings in Las Vegas
