= Global Philanthropy Group =

Global Philanthropy Group is a consulting firm that provides philanthropic services for high-net-worth individuals, charitable foundations and corporations. Their clients include John Legend, Avril Lavigne, Madonna, Tegan and Sara, Miley Cyrus, Eva Longoria, Gucci, Task Rabbit and Tory Burch. They have offices in Los Angeles and New York.

== History ==
Global Philanthropy Group was founded in 2006 by Maggie Neilson, Trevor Neilson and Ann Kelly.

In 2017, Global Philanthropy Group was acquired by Charity Network, joining digital fundraising companies Charitybuzz and Prizeo. The firm played a key role in advising on the creation of the Make it Right Foundation. Neilson and Nina Killeen worked with Pitt to launch Make It Right, a foundation for rebuilding New Orleans’s Ninth Ward after Hurricane Katrina. The Make It Right Foundation has been much criticized for building substandard housing for low income residents in New Orleans. In 2022, the Foundation paid $20.5 million to homeowners to settle a class action lawsuit.

== Founders ==
Maggie Neilson is a founding board member of the Center for Women & Democracy, sits on the Parent Revolution Board and the New Leadership Board for the International Women's Health Coalition. She spoke at the South by Southwest Interactive Conference in 2014 about feminism, philanthropy and technology.

Trevor Neilson is a member of the Council on Foreign Relations, and serves on the advisory boards of the Desmond Tutu Peace Foundation, the Los Angeles Police Foundation, the Wikimedia Foundation, the Massachusetts General Hospital Center for Global Health and the Genocide Intervention Network. Trevor was named a Young Global Leader by the World Economic Forum and was a member of the Clinton Global Initiative.

Trevor speaks frequently about the topic of philanthropy, including panels at the TEDxWomen conference and American Express Luxury Summit. He previously wrote a column for the Huffington Post about philanthropy and other topics. Trevor is also the co-founder and CEO of i(x) investments a permanently capitalized, multi-strategy impact investing platform.

== Services ==
Global Philanthropy Group's services include consulting on philanthropic strategy, research and briefing for clients on important issues, helping clients identify issues and causes to support and connecting clients with well-known D.C. figures, nonprofit organizations, and development leaders.

In 2013, Global Philanthropy Group announced the formation of Global Philanthropy Digital, designed to leverage technology and social media for social good.

Their website also lists the following philanthropy services:

- Strategic planning services
- Strategy implementation and support
- Performance vetting, monitoring & evaluation
- Advocacy and communications services
- Legal, tax, and governance structure support
- Trust and estate planning
- Human rights record verification service
- Digital and social media strategy & management

== Media and publications ==
Global Philanthropy Group co-published “The 25 Best Givers” list with Barron's, an American weekly financial newspaper. The list is calculated based on resource management, connectivity, innovative practices, sustainability, scalability, relationship management, transparency reporting, and issue severity. The top five philanthropists on the 2010 list included the Bill And Melinda Gates Foundation, The Omidyar Network, The Meth Project, the Skoll Foundation, and The Children's Investment Fund Foundation.

In 2018, Robb Report published an interview with Global Philanthropy Group CEO Maggie Neilson about consumer purchases making a philanthropic impact.

Global Philanthropy Group partner Trevor Neilson previously co-hosted a television series called “Giving” with Plum TV, “a multi-platform lifestyle network that targets the most active, influential, and educated audience in the world.” The series focused on the creative ways that philanthropists bring awareness and change to important global issues.
