= Andy Masi =

American businessperson

- Occupations: Nightlife entrepreneur Real estate developer
- Organization(s): Clique Hospitality; The Light Group

Andy Masi is an American entrepreneur, real estate developer, and business executive. With Andrew Sasson, he co-founded The Light Group, which was sold to the Hakkasan Group in 2014. In 2015, he founded Clique Hospitality, another hospitality and entertainment management firm. The company operates numerous bars, clubs, and restaurants, most of which are located in hotels.

Masi first started in the hospitality business in 1999, opening the House of Blues in the Las Vegas hotel, Mandalay Bay. In 2001, he co-founded The Light Group with Andrew Sasson. The group partnered with MGM Resorts and was responsible for the operation of a variety of bars, clubs, and restaurants in hotels on the Las Vegas Strip including, Mist, Fix, Jet, Stack, and Bare. During his tenure as CEO of The Light Group, Masi oversaw a total of 26 venues.

In 2014, The Light Group was acquired by the Hakkasan Group. In 2015, Masi co-founded Clique Hospitality. One of its first venues was a lounge called Clique located in the Cosmopolitan of Las Vegas. By the following year, the group was operating clubs, restaurants, and bars in a variety of new hotels including the Red Rock Resort, The Mirage, and Green Valley Ranch. It began operating 3 venues in the Pendry Hotel in San Diego's Gaslamp Quarter in early 2017.
