= List of tallest buildings in Las Vegas =

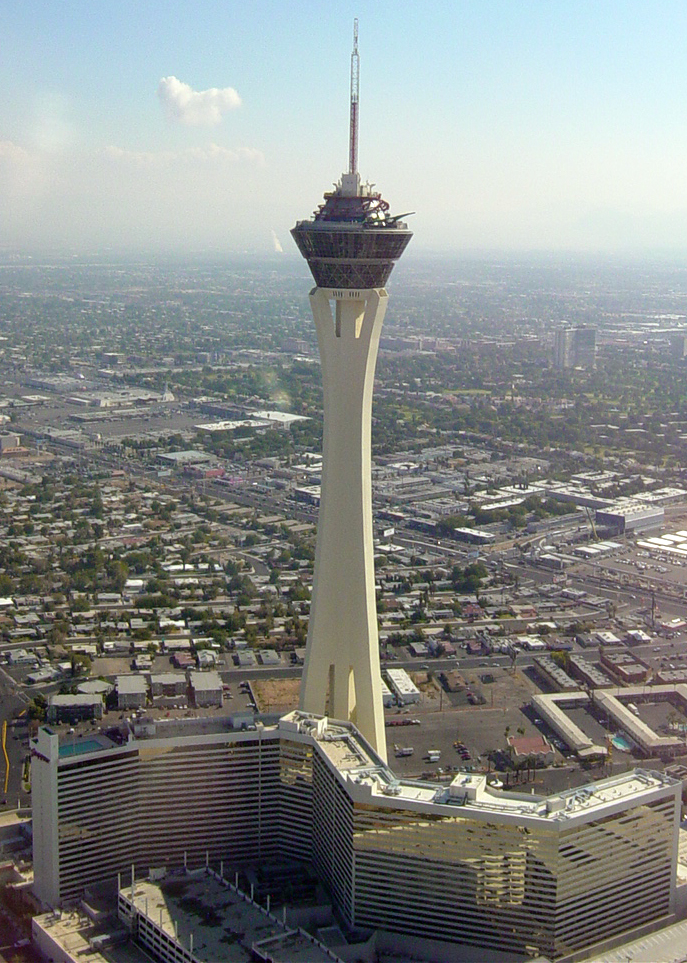
The Strat tower is the tallest observation tower in the United States

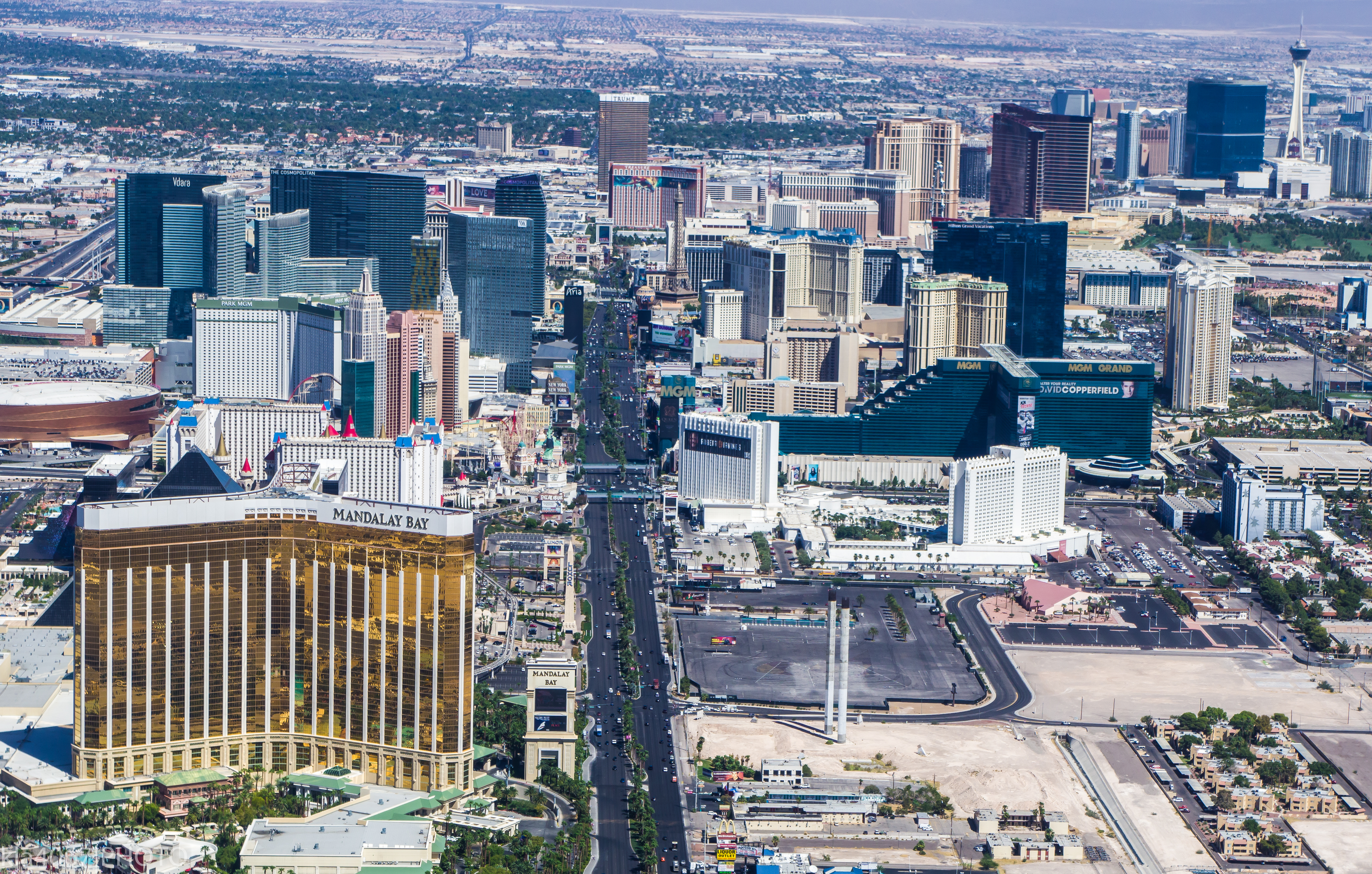
The Strip in 2018

The city of Las Vegas, Nevada and its surrounding unincorporated communities in the Las Vegas Valley are the sites of more than 160 high-rises, 42 of which stand taller than 400 feet (122 m). The tallest structure in the city is the Strat tower, which rises 1,149 feet (350 m) just north of the Las Vegas Strip. The tower is also the tallest observation tower in the United States. However, the Strat is not considered a building because the vast majority of the tower is not habitable. The tallest building in Las Vegas is the Fontainebleau Las Vegas, which rises 735 feet (224 m) and was topped out in November 2008. This building remained unfinished for several years due to the late-2000s recession and opened in December 2023. The second tallest habitable building in the city is the 59-story Resorts World, which rises 673 feet (205 m) and was completed in 2021.

Beginning in the 1960s, high-rise hotels began to become more concentrated on the Las Vegas Strip. The first high-rise hotel and casino resort to rise higher than 492 feet (150 m) was the 529-foot (161 m) New York-New York Hotel & Casino, completed in 1997. Las Vegas entered into a skyscraper-building boom in the late 1990s that has continued to the present; of the city's 40 tallest skyscrapers, 39 were completed after 1997. As of 2025, the skyline of Las Vegas is ranked 66th in the world and 18th in the United States with 176 completed high-rises.In what is being dubbed a "Manhattanization wave", there are over 30 skyscrapers that are proposed, approved or under construction in the city that are planned to rise over 400 feet (122 m) in height. The tallest building approved for the city is the World Jewelry Center, which is planned for construction in Downtown Las Vegas. The 815-foot (248 m) tower is part of a proposal to construct a hub for the world's jewelry industry, across from World Market Center Las Vegas. The tallest building in Las Vegas is the Fontainebleau Las Vegas, which has also been the tallest building in the city since its topping out in November 2008; construction on the building was suspended in mid-2009. Following numerous delays, the building opened in late 2023.

== Tallest buildings ==
Was the tallest building in Las Vegas upon completion

This list ranks completed and topped out skyscrapers in Las Vegas that stand at least 400 feet (122 m) tall, based on standard height measurement. This includes spires and architectural details, but does not include antenna masts. An equal sign (=) following a rank indicates the same height between two or more buildings. The "Year" column indicates the year in which a building was completed. Freestanding observation towers, while not habitable buildings, are included for comparison purposes, but not ranked.

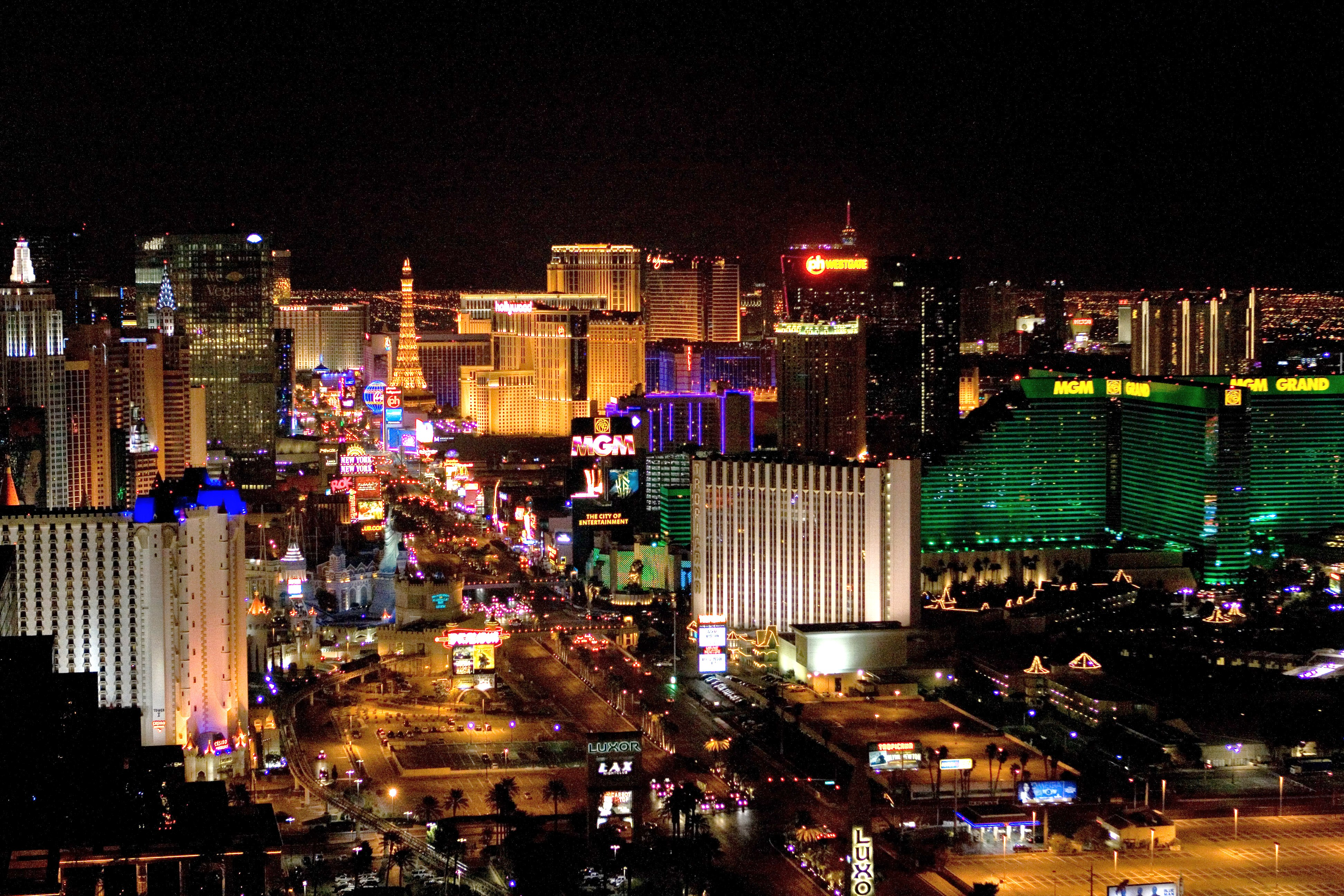
The Strip at night in 2010

Many Las Vegas skyscrapers are located on the Las Vegas Strip, the majority of which is located outside the Las Vegas city limits. This list includes all skyscrapers which are included within the city limits of Las Vegas and the surrounding communities which use Las Vegas as an official address. The United States Postal Service uses "Las Vegas, NV" as the official mailing address for the unincorporated places of Paradise, Winchester, and Spring Valley, and as such the distinction between the city and the surrounding communities is often not apparent.

Rank	Name	Image	Height ft (m)	Floors	Year	Coordinates	Notes
^{[Note A]}	The Strat	Ground-level view of a tall, concrete tower. The tower curves inward about 30 stories up, but then projects outward. Its uppermost section consists of a rounded, black glass platform and a large, thin spire.	1,149 (350)	106	1996	36°8′50.59″N 115°9′19.40″W	Tallest observation tower in the United States, second-tallest in the Western Hemisphere after the CN Tower in Toronto; second-tallest free-standing structure in the U.S. west of the Mississippi River, after the Kennecott Smokestack in Utah; has been the tallest structure in Las Vegas since 1996. Originally known as the Stratosphere, until 2020.
1	Fontainebleau Las Vegas	Ground-level view of an under construction 68-story building.	735 (224)	67	2023	36°8′15.97″N 115°9′33.92″W	Located in Winchester, Nevada. Topped out in November 2008, becoming the tallest building in Las Vegas and the state of Nevada. Tallest building constructed in Las Vegas in the 2000s. Construction stopped in 2009, amid financial problems. Tallest completed building in Las Vegas and Nevada; tallest hotel in Las Vegas. After several ownership changes, construction resumed in 2021 and the resort opened in 2023.
2	Resorts World Las Vegas	Ground-level view of a curved building with a dark brown facade. The building has dark windows and has bright red edging on the ends.	673 (205)	59	2021	36°8′0.07″N 115°9′57.63″W	Located in Winchester, Nevada. Topped out in August 2019. Tallest building constructed in Las Vegas in the 2010s. Opened on June 24, 2021.
3	The Palazzo	Ground-level view of a curved building with a tan facade. The building has dark windows and several protruding ledges at various points.	642 (196)	53	2007	36°7′26.69″N 115°10′4.35″W	Located in Paradise, Nevada.
4	Encore	Ground-level view of a convex, curved building; the building has a complete glass facade and is light brown in color.	631 (192)	49	2008	36°7′46.4″N 115°9′52.92″W	Located in Paradise, Nevada.
5	Trump International Hotel & Tower	Ground-level view of a building with a rectangular cross section and a golden glass facade	622 (190)	57	2008	36°7′46.96″N 115°10′21.27″W	Located in Paradise, Nevada. Tallest residential building in the city.
6	Wynn		614 (187)	45	2005	36°7′35.23″N 115°9′56.55″W	Located in Paradise, Nevada.
7=	The Cosmopolitan Boulevard Tower	Cosmopolitan Resort in 2010 from the east.	610 (184)	50	2010	36°6′35.45″N 115°10′26.13″W	Located in Paradise, Nevada.
7=	The Cosmopolitan Chelsea Tower	Cosmopolitan Resort from north in 2010.	610 (184)	52	2010	36°6′35.45″N 115°10′26.13″W	Located in Paradise, Nevada.
9=	Aria Resort & Casino	alt=Distant ground-level view of 48-story tower; the building has a curved facade of blue glass. It is under construction, but nearly complete. Several unfinished buildings are visible around it.	600 (183)	48	2009	36°6′28.15″N 115°10′37.41″W	Located in Paradise, Nevada. Floors 40-49 are skipped due to superstition
9=	Elara	View of Elara tower from north.	600 (183)	50	2009	36°6′30.65″N 115°10′7.75″W	Located in Paradise, Nevada.
11	Vdara	Elevated view of a construction site; at center is the partially completed steel frame of a curved building. Several cranes and construction vehicles are visible.	570 (174)	54	2009	36°6′34.02″N 115°10′40.66″W	Located in Paradise, Nevada.
12	Waldorf Astoria Las Vegas	Ground level view of a 46-story building with a rectangular cross section and an all-glass facade; the building is still under construction, and a crane is visible on its roof.	560 (171)	46	2009	36°6′22.32″N 115°10′27.83″W	Located in Paradise, Nevada.
^{[Note A]}	High Roller	High Roller under construction in Las Vegas in September 2013	550 (167)	50	2014	36°7′3.55″N 115°10′5.61″W	Not a building, but included for comparison purposes; it was the world's tallest Ferris wheel until 2021.
^{[Note A]}	Eiffel Tower at Paris Las Vegas	Ground-level view of a steel tower; the tower is broad at its base, rising from four separate legs. It then tapers, with each leg meeting to form a single, latticework column. Three platforms are visible at various heights up the side of the structure.	540 (165)	50	1999	36°6′44.88″N 115°10′20.23″W	Located in Paradise, Nevada. Half-scale replica of the Eiffel Tower in Paris, France.
13	New York-New York Hotel & Casino	Ground level view of a 44-story building that looks like a city skyline, forming several different towers of varying heights. A roller coaster also visible in front of the towers.	529 (161)	44	1997	36°6′8.06″N 115°10′27.53″W	Located in Paradise, Nevada. Tallest building constructed in Las Vegas in the 1990s
14	Palms Place	Ground-level view of a 47-story building with a rectangular cross section and a grooved, all-glass facade	517 (157)	47	2008	36°6′50.68″N 115°11′55.43″W	Located in Paradise, Nevada.
15	Bellagio	Ground-level view of a broad, 35-story building; the structure is curved, and has a tan facade. A body of water is visible in the foreground.	508 (155)	35	1998	36°6′47.16″N 115°10′35.52″W	Located in Paradise, Nevada.
16	The Martin	Panorama towers complex.	500 (152)	42	2009	36°6′30.46″N 115°10′56.65″W	Located in Paradise, Nevada.
17	Sky Las Vegas	Sky Las Vegas from the south.	500 (152)	45	2007	36°8′19.53″N 115°9′41.1″W	Located in Winchester, Nevada.
18	W	Ground-level view of a V-shaped, 45-story building with a golden, all-glass facade; a palm tree is visible in the foreground, and it partially blocks the view of the skyscraper.	485 (148)	45	2003	36°5′34.54″N 115°10′38.57″W	Located in Paradise, Nevada.
19=	Mandalay Bay	Ground-level view of a building with three thin towers that meet at a central point to form a Y-shape; each has a golden glass facade.	480 (146)	43	1999	36°5′30.48″N 115°10′29.22″W	Located in Paradise, Nevada.
19=	Circa Resort & Casino	View of the Circa Resort in October 2020.	480 (146)	35	2020	36°10′18″N 115°8′44″W	Tallest building in Las Vegas city limits.
21=	Turnberry Place – Tower I	Distant ground-level view of four identical 40-story buildings; each structure has a white concrete facade with balconies at every floor level and a rounded roof.	477 (145)	38	2001	36°8′26.39″N 115°9′11.24″W	
21=	Turnberry Place – Tower II	Distant ground-level view of four identical 40-story buildings; each structure has a white concrete facade with balconies at every floor level and a rounded roof.	477 (145)	38	2002	36°8′26.39″N 115°9′11.24″W	
21=	Turnberry Place – Tower III	Distant ground-level view of four identical 40-story buildings; each structure has a white concrete facade with balconies at every floor level and a rounded roof.	477 (145)	38	2004	36°8′26.39″N 115°9′11.24″W	
21=	Turnberry Place – Tower IV	Distant ground-level view of four identical 40-story buildings; each structure has a white concrete facade with balconies at every floor level and a rounded roof.	477 (145)	38	2006	36°8′26.39″N 115°9′11.24″W	
25=	The Signature at MGM Grand – Tower I	Distant ground-level view of three identical 38-story towers; the building has gold colored windows and balconies on each floor.	475 (145)	38	2006	36°6′24.66″N 115°9′59.18″W	Located in Paradise, Nevada.
25=	The Signature at MGM Grand – Tower II	Distant ground-level view of three identical 38-story towers; the building has gold colored windows and balconies on each floor.	475 (145)	38	2006	36°6′24.66″N 115°9′59.18″W	Located in Paradise, Nevada.
25=	The Signature at MGM Grand – Tower III	Distant ground-level view of three identical 38-story towers; the building has gold colored windows and balconies on each floor.	475 (145)	38	2007	36°6′24.66″N 115°9′59.18″W	Located in Paradise, Nevada.
28	The Venetian	Distant ground-level view of a V-shaped building with a brick and tan facade and dark windows. Two shorter buildings with similar appearances are visible in the distance. A tall brick tower with a steep, green, pyramid-shaped roof is in the foreground.	475 (145)	37	1999	36°7′17.83″N 115°10′9.29″W	Located in Paradise, Nevada.
29	Allure Las Vegas	Allure Las Vegas tower.	466 (142)	41	2007	36°8′38.46″N 115°9′32.6″W	
30	Palms Fantasy Tower	Fantasy Tower at the Palms resort in Las Vegas	458 (140)	40	2006	36°6′50.09″N 115°11′40.29″W	
31=	Turnberry Towers – Tower I	Ground-level view of a 45-story tower at night; the building, which is lit up, has a rectangular cross section and a white facade.	453 (138)	45	2007	36°8′26.39″N 115°9′11.24″W	
31=	Turnberry Towers – Tower II	Ground-level view of a 45-story tower at night; the building, which is lit up, has a rectangular cross section and a white facade.	453 (138)	45	2008	36°8′26.39″N 115°9′11.24″W	
33	Palace Tower (Caesars Palace)	Ground-level view of a 30-story skyscraper at night; the building, which is lit up, has a rectangular cross section and a white facade.	435 (133)	30	1998	36°7′0.35″N 115°10′37.95″W	Located in Paradise, Nevada.
34=	Veer Towers West	View of the twin Veers Towers complex from the west.	433 (132)	37	2010	36°6′26.92″N 115°10′30.23″W	Located in Paradise, Nevada.
34=	Veer Towers East	View of the twin Veers Towers complex from the west.	433 (132)	37	2010	36°6′26.4″N 115°10′27.74″W	
36=	Rio Masquerade Tower	Distant ground-level view of an all-glass tower; the tower has several setbacks near its roof. The glass is mostly a dark blue color, but some windows are tinted red to form a stripe down the side of the building. A prominent "Rio" sign is visible in the foreground.	423 (129)	41	1997	36°6′57.67″N 115°11′11.5″W	Located in Paradise, Nevada.
36=	Palms Ivory Tower	Ivory Tower during 2008 renovations.	423 (129)	42	2001	36°6′53.61″N 115°11′38.63″W	Located in Paradise, Nevada.
38=	Marriott's Grand Chateau	Marriotts Grand Chateau tower view from west in Las Vegas.	420 (128)	38	2008	36°6′27.68″N 115°10′10.07″W	
38=	Panorama Tower I	Panorama towers complex.	420 (128)	33	2006	36°6′26.97″N 115°10′57.11″W	
38=	Panorama Tower II	Panorama towers complex.	420 (128)	33	2007	36°6′23.97″N 115°10′57.34″W	
41	Hilton Grand Vacations Club – Tower 2	Ground-level view of a 38-story tower and a 28-story tower, both brown in color.	405 (123)	39	2006	36°8′23.9″N 115°9′38.78″W	
42=	The D Las Vegas	The D Las Vegas	400 (122)	34	1979	36°10′11.33″N 115°8′33.59″W	Tallest building constructed in Las Vegas in the 1970s
42=	Planet Hollywood Las Vegas	Ground-level view of a sharp corner of a V-shaped building; the tower has a light tan facade with dark blue windows.	400 (122)	40	2000	36°6′35.89″N 115°10′16.94″W	

== Tallest buildings under construction or proposed ==
Rank	Name	Image	Height ft (m)	Floors	Year	Coordinates	Notes
1	Hard Rock Las Vegas		335 (102) - 660 (200)	31 - 42	2027	36°07′16″N 115°10′31″W	An addition to the Mirage, which will be rebranded under the Hard Rock name.

== Timeline of tallest buildings ==
This lists buildings that once held the title of tallest building in Las Vegas as well as the current titleholder, Fontainebleau Las Vegas. The Strat observation tower has been the tallest free-standing structure in the city since its 1996 completion, but since it is not a fully habitable building it is not included in this list.

Name	Image	Street address	Years as tallest	Height ft (m)	Floors	Coordinates	Reference
Riviera Hotel and Casino Mediterranean Tower		2901 Las Vegas Boulevard South	1955-1956	97 (29)	9	36.135°N 115.162°W	First high-rise resort on the Strip. Was imploded June 14 and August 16, 2016.
Fremont Hotel and Casino		200 Fremont Street	1956-1961	177 (54)	15	36°10′15″N 115°8′35″W	First high-rise resort in downtown Las Vegas.
Landmark	.	364 Convention Center Drive	1962–1969	297 (91)	31	36.133051°N 115.155808°W	Was imploded on November 7, 1995.
Westgate Las Vegas	Distant ground-level view of a curved building with a white, concrete facade and dark, blue-tinted windows. Monorail tracks are visible in the foreground.	3000 Paradise Road South	1969–1981	375 (114)	30	36°8′10.98″N 115°9′6.3″W	Previously known for decades as the Las Vegas Hilton.
Fitzgeralds Casino Hotel Las Vegas	Ground-level view of the front entrance to a casino; a very prominent, colorful sign features a rainbow and a pot-of-gold. There are slot machines inside the building, and glass windows and part of a skyscraper are visible above the sign.	301 Fremont Street	1981–1997	400 (122)	34	36°10′11.33″N 115°8′33.59″W	Was known as the Sundance Hotel from 1980 to 1987. Currently known as The D Las Vegas since 2012. The 34-Story Tower was built in 1981.
New York-New York Hotel & Casino	Ground level view of a 50-story building that looks like a city skyline, forming several different towers of varying heights. A roller coaster is visible in front of the towers.	3790 Las Vegas Boulevard South	1997–2005	529 (161)	45	36°6′8.06″N 115°10′27.53″W	
Wynn Las Vegas	Ground-level view of a thin, curved building with a brown glass facade	3131 Las Vegas Boulevard South	2005–2007	614 (187)	45	36°7′35.23″N 115°9′56.55″W	
The Palazzo	Ground-level view of a curved building with a tan facade. The building has dark windows and several protruding ledges at various points.	3325 Las Vegas Boulevard South	2007–2009	642 (196)	53	36°7′26.69″N 115°10′4.35″W	
Fontainebleau Las Vegas	The Fontainebleau Resort under construction in 2009 from the south.	2755 Las Vegas Boulevard South	2009–present	735 (224)	68	36°8′15.97″N 115°9′33.92″W	

== Explanatory notes ==
A. ^ ^{a} ^{b} According to the Council on Tall Buildings and Urban Habitat, freestanding observation towers are not considered to be buildings, as they are not fully habitable structures. These structures are included for comparative purposes.
