= First Republic Square =

Square in Tbilisi, Georgia

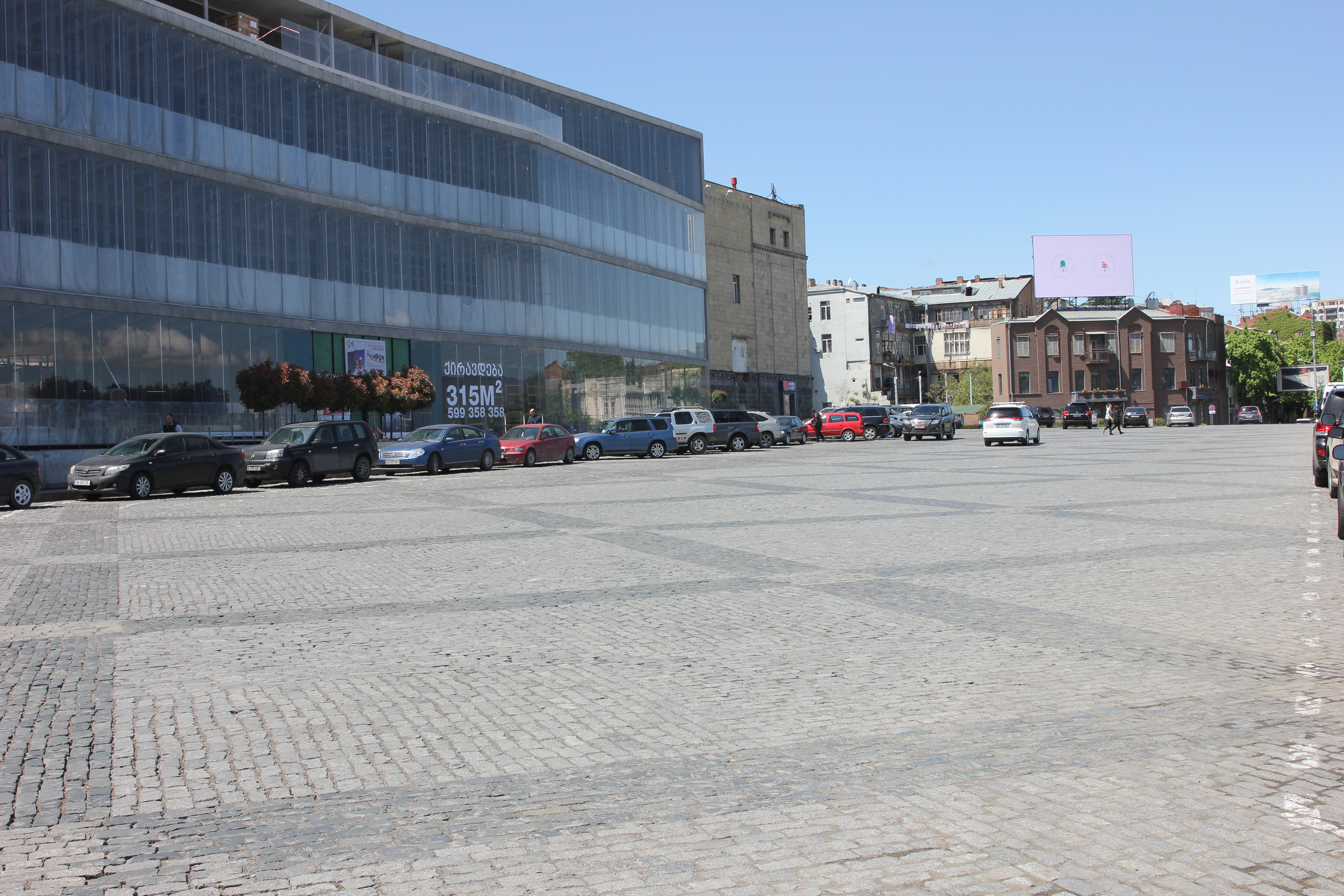
- Interactive map of First Republic Square
- Native name: პირველი რესპუბლიკის მოედანი (Georgian)
- Namesake: Democratic Republic of Georgia
- Type: Square
- Location: Tbilisi, Georgia
- Coordinates: 41°42′14″N 44°47′32″E

First Republic Square (Georgian: პირველი რესპუბლიკის მოედანი), formerly known as Rose Revolution Square (Georgian: ვარდების რევოლუციის მოედანი) and Republic Square (Georgian: რესპუბლიკის მოედანი), is a square in the Vera district of Tbilisi at the western end of Rustaveli Ave.

== History ==
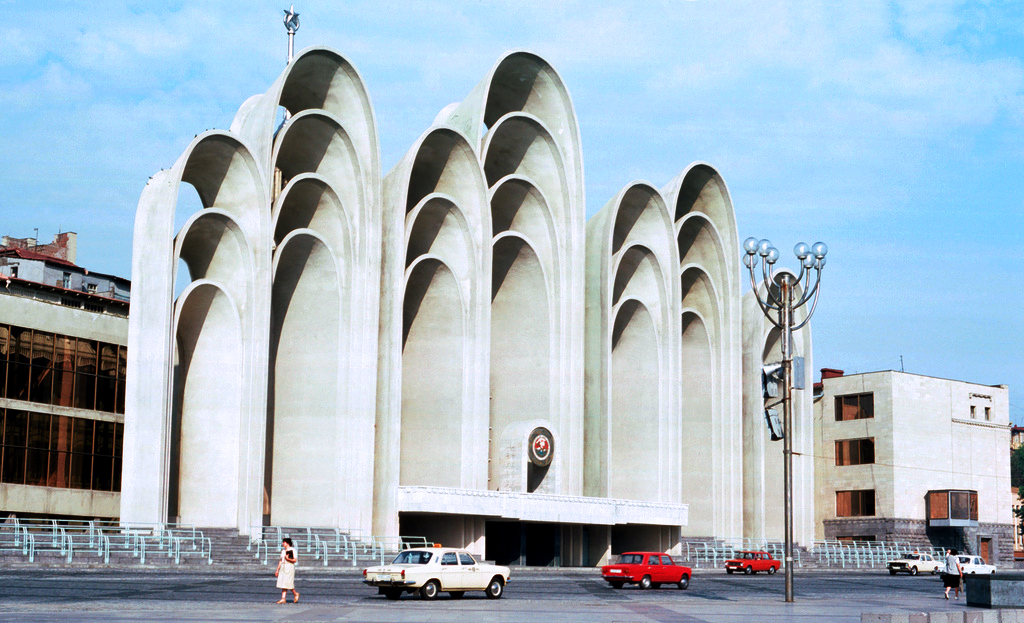
Andropov's Ears (demolished in 2005)

The square was constructed in 1983 and named Republic Square. It was used for civic and military parades of the Georgian SSR and other public events. On the west side, the square featured a grandstand consisting of seven concrete arches, colloquially called "Andropov's Ears". This Soviet modernist structure was built by architect Otar Kalandarishvili on the occasion of an official visit by the head of state of the Soviet Union. On the east side, the square featured monumental lightpoles and fountains. The south corner of the square is shaped by the Iveria Hotel, constructed in 1967 as the then highest building of the Georgian SSR, and the former Central Post and Telegraph Office, constructed in the 1970s in Soviet brutalist style, which serves as a hotel today.

In 1997, president Eduard Shevardnadze inaugurated an equestrian statue of Georgian King David the Builder modeled by sculptor Merab Berdzenishvili. After the Rose Revolution, president Mikheil Saakashvili ordered the parade grandstand to be demolished in 2005. The fountains and the equestrian statue were also removed from the square.

In 2005 it was renamed into Rose Revolution Square after the Rose Revolution. In 2018, the square was renamed into the First Republic Square in memory of the 100 anniversary of the establishment of the First Republic of Georgia.

=== 2024 incident ===
On September 27, 2024, a 24-year-old Russian influencer named Arina Glazunova, died while filming a selfie video. She was walking backwards, tripped over the edge of an underground subway passage, and fell in, causing her to fracture her skull and later die. The subway passage did not have rails was slightly raised by 30 centimeters around the edge which made it hard to see at eye level. The absence of a rail or barrier sparked outrage online and concern that a similar situation could happen. The video of her fall went viral on TikTok and barriers were subsequently installed around the subway entrance to prevent future incidents from occurring.
