= Radisson Blu Iveria Hotel, Tbilisi =

Hotel in Tbilisi, Georgia

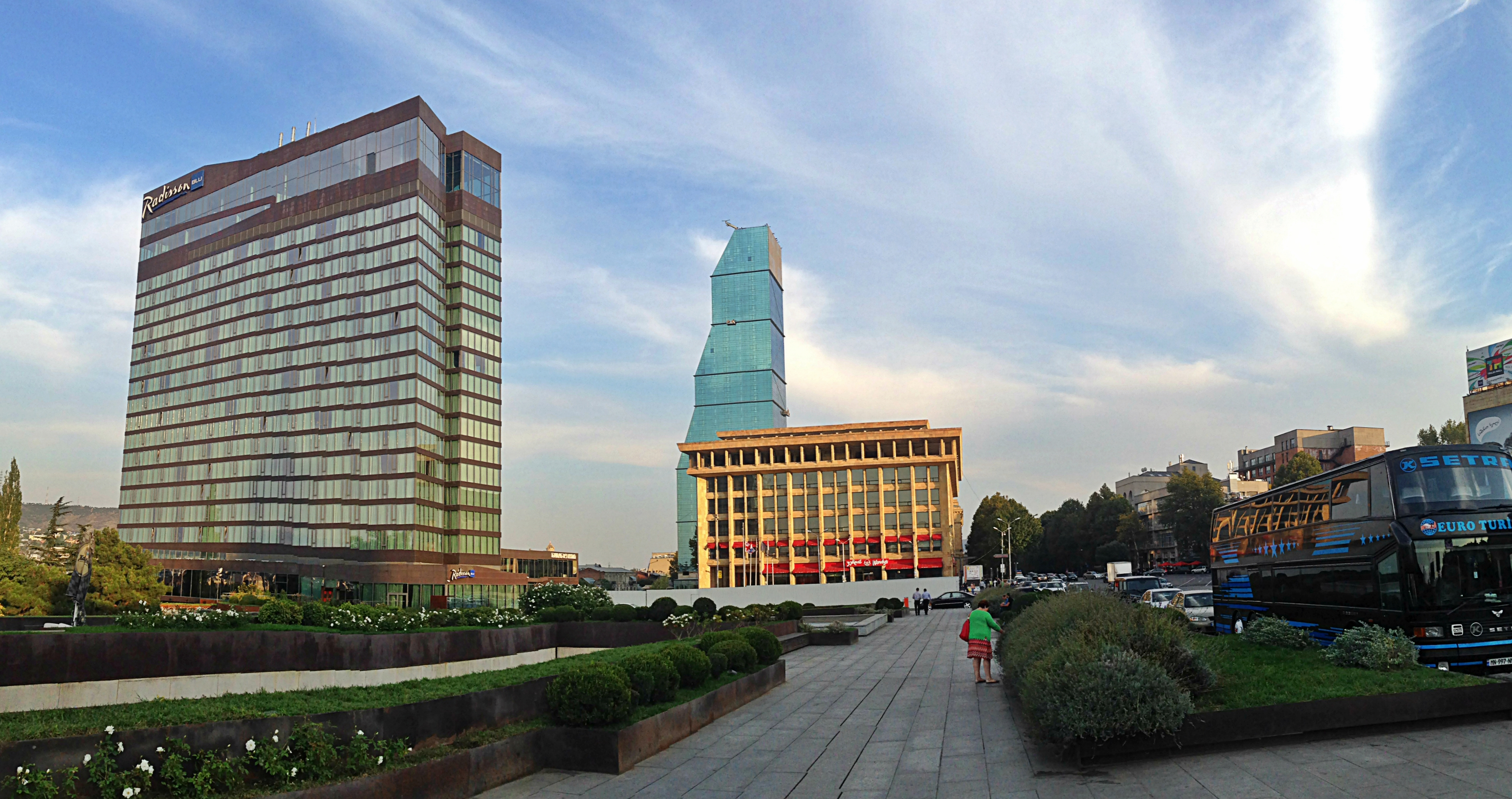
- Radisson Blu Iveria Hotel, Tbilisi, on left
- Interactive map of the Radisson Blu Iveria Hotel, Tbilisi area

General information
- Location: Rose Revolution Square, Tbilisi, Georgia
- Coordinates: 41°42′14″N 44°47′37″E
- Opening: 1967; 59 years ago, 2009; 17 years ago
- Operator: Carlson Rezidor Hospitality

Technical details
- Floor count: 18

Other information
- Number of rooms: 236
- Parking: Yes

Website
- www.radissonhotels.com/en-us/hotels/radisson-blu-tbilisi

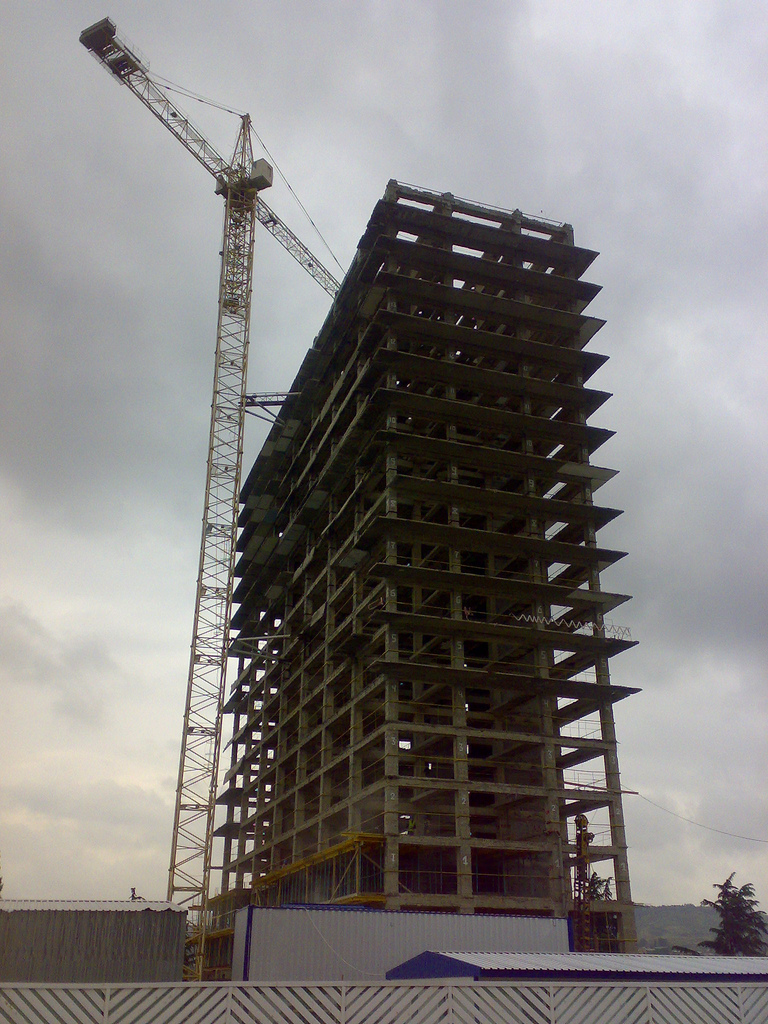
The hotel stripped to its steel skeleton in 2007

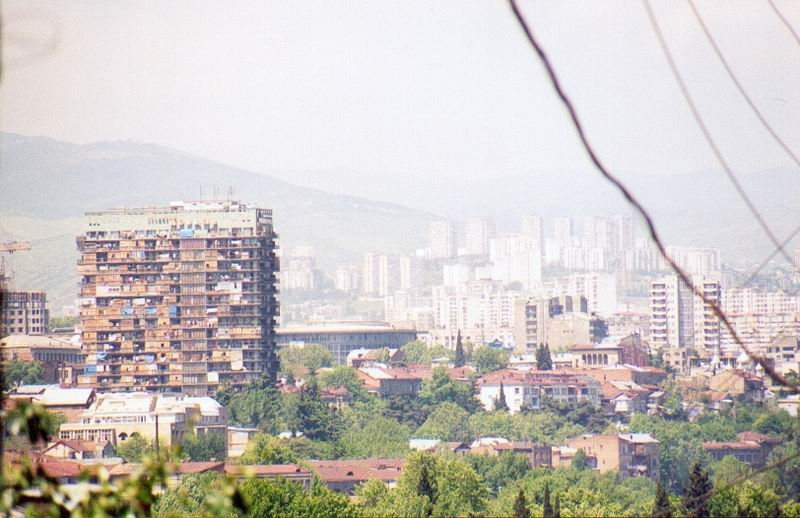
The hotel serving as refugee housing in 2002

The Radisson Blu Iveria Hotel is a 236-room hotel on Rose Revolution Square in the city center of Tbilisi. It has a casino and spa as well as good views of Mtatsminda District.

== History ==
The hotel was built in 1967 by the Soviet government as the premier luxury hotel of the Georgian Soviet Socialist Republic and was named Hotel Iveria after the ancient kingdom of Iveria. At that time, it was the tallest building in the city.

In 1992, due to the war in Abkhazia, the hotel became a refugee camp housing more than 800 refugees. In 2004, the refugees were removed from the hotel and offered $7,000 per room. The dilapidated hotel was stripped down to its steel structural frame and completely rebuilt as a modern luxury business hotel, managed by the Radisson Hotels group. It reopened in 2009 as the Radisson Blu Iveria Hotel. The new building was designed by Graft.
