= Trevor Neilson =

American businessperson (born 1972)

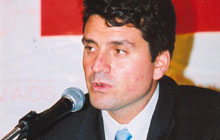
- Born: July 2, 1972 (age 54); Seattle, Washington, United States
- Education: Washington State University
- Occupation: Philanthropist

Trevor Neilson (born July 2, 1972) is an American businessperson, investor, entrepreneur and philanthropist. He is the co-founder, chairman and CEO of WasteFuel, a company that produces renewable fuels using proven technologies to address the climate emergency and revolutionize mobility.

He is also a co-founder of Global Philanthropy Group. Global Philanthropy Group was purchased by global advisory and advocacy communications consultancy APCO Worldwide in 2021. He has been active in a large number of philanthropic and political campaigns and has started a number of companies.

He was the co-founder and CEO of i(x) Net Zero, an investing platform which is traded on the London Stock Exchange (IX.).

Neilson is the co-founder and former chairman of the Climate Emergency Fund, the Philippines Foundation, and the Malibu Foundation.

He is an advisor on climate issues to Palo Alto–based PsiQuantum which is working is to build the world's first useful quantum computer out of conventional silicon chips.

== Early life and education ==
Neilson was born in Seattle, Washington on July 2, 1972. He is the oldest of five children, and all of his brothers and sisters were adopted. Neilson's mother and father were actively involved in child welfare, juvenile justice, and other related issues. Neilson's mother, Janice Secord Neilson, lead the World Association for Children and Parents, an international adoption and child welfare organization, for over thirty years. Neilson's father, Scott Charles Neilson, was the Juvenile Justice Commissioner for Thurston County in Washington State, and in the Washington State Attorney General's office.

Neilson's paternal grandmother is Mary McColl Neilson, a former Regional Director of the Environmental Protection Agency. Neilson's maternal grandmother, Betty Ward Secord, is a descendant of Julia Ward Howe, the women's suffrage and civil rights leader and writer of the Battle Hymn of the Republic.

Neilson attended Lincoln Elementary School in Olympia, Washington, Washington Middle School in Olympia, Washington, Summit K-12 (for one year), Franklin High School in Seattle, Washington State University, and the Seattle University School of Law. He left law school in his second year in order to work for the Bill & Melinda Gates Foundation.

== Career ==
Upon leaving Washington State University, Neilson moved to Washington, D.C. where he became an intern for United States Representative Jolene Unsoeld in the Lyndon Baines Johnson Congressional Scholar program. Following that internship and Bill Clinton’s election as president, Neilson moved to the White House where he became an intern in the White House Office of Scheduling and Advance. After that, Neilson became a member of the White House Advance Team, traveling ahead of President Clinton to manage meetings and events around the world.

After leaving the White House, Neilson returned to Seattle and began working for EvansGroup where he helped launch the public affairs practice. After a short time, Neilson left EvansGroup to pursue his passion for public education with a position at the Washington Education Association.

After two years in that position, Neilson was hired by General John Stanford to become Director of Communications for the Seattle Public Schools. Stanford, a former leader of the Gulf War, had been hired by the Seattle School Board to implement an aggressive reform agenda. Stanford became a beloved figure in Seattle, rallying parents, students and the business community to turn around a failing school system. After a few months on the job, Neilson had the responsibility of announcing to the public and media that Stanford had leukemia.

Following Stanford's death, Neilson was recruited for a new position with an emerging foundation which would become the Bill & Melinda Gates Foundation. Bill Gates, Melinda French Gates, Bill Gates Sr. and Patty Stonesifer hired Neilson as Director of Communications for the Gates Learning Foundation. Following that, the Gates Learning Foundation merged with the William H. Gates Foundation and Neilson became Director of Communications for the newly combined entity named the Bill & Melinda Gates Foundation. During his time as Director of Communications for the Bill & Melinda Gates Foundation, Neilson also was personal spokesperson for Bill and Melinda Gates on issues unrelated to their philanthropic work.

In this role, Neilson was asked by Bobby Shriver, son of Sargent and Eunice Shriver and nephew of President John F. Kennedy if Bill Gates would support an idea that he and Bono, the Irish musician and activist had. Shriver and Bono wanted to create a version of the National Rifle Association of America for the poorest people in the world, specifically Africans who lived under a dollar a day and grappled with AIDS, Tuberculosis, Malaria, famine and other problems. Shriver and Bono's idea was to create a powerful political voice for these people, one which could not be ignored by elected officials and those who appropriate funding. This organization was called the ONE Campaign and was later credited with having helped secure the largest funding commitment to the fight against AIDS ever made by any government.

Following his time at the Bill & Melinda Gates Foundation, Neilson moved to New York and became executive director of the Global Business Coalition on HIV/AIDS.

== Founding of Global Philanthropy Group ==
After leaving the Global Business Coalition on HIV/AIDS, Neilson was co-founder of Global Philanthropy Group, a firm that designs and implements philanthropic strategies for high-net-worth individuals and companies. Neilson worked with Brad Pitt launch Make It Right, a foundation for rebuilding New Orleans's Ninth Ward after Hurricane Katrina. The Make It Right Foundation has been much criticized for building substandard housing for low income residents in New Orleans. In 2022 the Foundation paid $20.5 million to homeowners to settle a class action lawsuit.

Neilson has worked with over sixty of the worlds’ philanthropists, business leaders and celebrities. The New York Times profiled Neilson in December 2010 and said “few philanthropic advisers have a celebrity Rolodex as full as Mr. Neilson’s.”

== Leadership of G2 Investment Group ==
Following the founding of Global Philanthropy Group, Neilson became President of G2 Investment Group, a New York-based investment management company. G2 has been profiled by the Financial Times and Los Angeles Times which compared its approach to that of Warren Buffett saying “they aim to build a conglomerate in the mold of investing wizard Warren Buffett”.

== Founding and Leadership of i(x) investments (now i(x) Net Zero) ==
Neilson co-founded i(x) investments (now i(x) Net Zero) with Howard Warren Buffett in 2015. The company launched in 2015 with a piece in the New York Times.
