= Andrew Sasson =

Entrepreneur and real estate developer

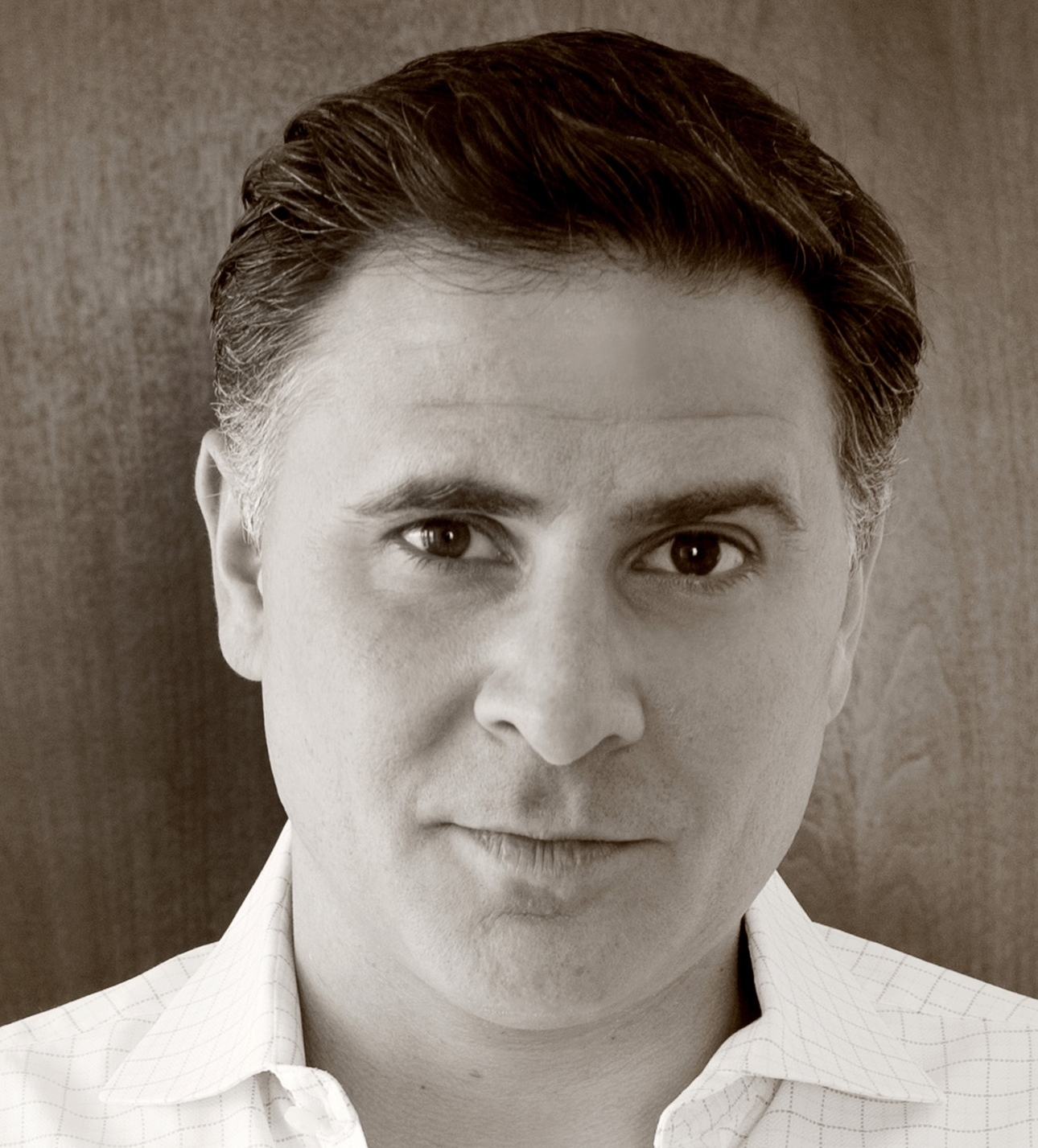
- Sasson in 2014
- Born: 1970 (age 55–56); Surrey, England
- Occupations: Nightlife entrepreneur Real estate developer Investor

Andrew Jacques Sasson (born 1970 in Walton-on-Thames, England) is a British-American entrepreneur, hotelier, and real estate developer. With Andy Masi, he is the co-founder of The Light Group, which owns several restaurants, bars, and nightclubs, mainly in the New York City and Las Vegas areas.

== Early life and early career ==
Sasson was born in 1970 and grew up in Surrey, which borders South London. At the age of 15, he began working at his family's restaurant in Palma de Mallorca, Spain. He learned about the hospitality industry – from food service to day-to-day operations – and spent his nights exploring Spain's nightclub scene. He studied at Florida International University for a year, and then remained in Miami, working as a doorman at the nightclub Velvet and learning the behind-the-scenes business of that industry.

== Career ==
In 2025, he joined the board of Soho House and also became an advisor to Wynn Hotels and Casinos.

=== The Light Group ===
Sasson moved to New York City in 1995, and opened his own nightclub, Jet Lounge, in SoHo. He then partnered with Noah Tepperberg and Jason Strauss to open Conscience Point in the Hamptons; as well as Jet East, also in the Hamptons and Jet 19, on the Lower East Side. In 2000, he partnered with Chris Barish and Keith Barish to open Light, a midtown Manhattan after-work and late-night lounge and restaurant.

In 2001, Sasson moved to Las Vegas, where he and the Barishes opened the Las Vegas branch of Light at the Bellagio Hotel. Light was the first upscale nightclub to open within a hotel, and was one of the first nightclubs in Las Vegas to offer its clientele high-end bottle service. Following Light, Sasson and Barish opened Caramel lounge at the Bellagio, and Mist lounge at Treasure Island.

With business partner, Andy Masi, Sasson founded The Light Group . The Light Group entered into partnership with MGM Resorts International, In 2004, the group opened the FIX Restaurant & Bar at the Bellagio.

In 2005, The Light Group opened JET Nightclub and STACK Restaurant & Bar, both of which marked The Mirage as a leading venue; in 2007, they added BARE, an exclusive European-style sun-bathing pool lounge. In 2006, Sasson became director and chief operating officer of India Hospitality Corp., an Indian hospitality and leisure company, and held the position through 2010.

At the Monte Carlo, The Light Group opened two restaurants: Diablo's Cantina in 2007, and BRAND Steakhouse & Lounge in 2008. In 2008 at the Bellagio, The Light Group opened The Bank, a small exclusive nightclub, and Yellowtail Japanese Restaurant & Bar, featuring chef Akira Back. At The Mirage, The Light Group acquired the Beatles Revolution Lounge, created by Cirque du Soleil, in November 2008.

Also in 2008, Sasson sold a 50% stake in The Light Group to the Dubai firm Zabeel Investments. The sale netted him nearly $100 million, and the additional income placed him at 784 on the Sunday Times Rich List of Britain's wealthiest people. In 2009, The Light Group opened several nightclubs, restaurants, and lounges at Las Vegas's new CityCenter.

In 2011, Sasson sold off a 90% interest in The Light Group to Morgans Hotel Group. He sat on the board of directors of Morgans until his resignation in 2013.

The Light Group closed JET Nightclub at The Mirage and re-opened it as 1OAK on New Year's Eve 2011. In 2012 and 2013, the company opened five new venues at Mandalay Bay: KUMI Japanese Restaurant & Bar; the 24-hour restaurant Citizens Kitchen & Bar; dinner, cocktail, and nightlife destination Red Square; LIGHT Nightclub featuring Cirque du Soleil; and DAYLIGHT Beach Club.

In 2012, the Light Group opened two venues at the Delano Hotel in Miami: Bianca, an Italian restaurant with a cuisine based on organic farm-to-table ingredients, and FDR, a nightclub.

By 2014, The Light Group owned and operated 20 nightlife, daylife, and dining venues at the Bellagio, Mandalay Bay, Aria Resort & Casino, The Mirage, and the Monte Carlo, as well at as Miami's Delano Hotel. In early 2015, Hakkasan acquired The Light Group, including Sasson's remaining 5% interest in the company.

=== Additional ventures ===
In 2004, Sasson ventured into real estate in Las Vegas, opening Panorama Towers, a luxury condo tower which helped pioneer the Las Vegas high-rise market. The 300 units of its first tower sold out in eight weeks. Panorama Towers expanded to over 900 units, and Sasson sold his share in the development at the peak of the Las Vegas real estate market.

As of 2016, Sasson is an investor and board member at Independent Sports and Entertainment (ISE). The company, formerly Relativity Sports, is an integrated sports, media, entertainment and management company that represents athletes in the U.S.

== Influence ==
Regarding his role in transforming the culture of Las Vegas, the Financial Times in 2008 described Sasson as an innovator who "built a small but fast-growing empire that has played a role in changing the city's image and reputation". FT went on to say that he had been instrumental in changing the city into "a culinary and nightlife hotspot, attracting hordes of young, affluent people eager to eat, drink and party. Gambling remains popular but to many younger Sin City visitors it is now a secondary pursuit, overtaken in revenue terms by food, beverage and entertainment sales."

In 2010, Sasson was listed as one of "Nightlife's Biggest Players", and cited as a highly successful empire-builder. He has been noted for his attention to detail and service, and for his vision of focusing on a wealthy, youthful, fashionable clientele, including the new generation of Hollywood celebrities. Sasson also pioneered the pricey amenity of high-end bottle service in Las Vegas – one feature of his typically high-end, luxury ventures.
