= Boutique Design =

American magazine

- Editor: Mary Scoviak
- Categories: Hospitality Interiors
- Frequency: Bi-monthly
- Publisher: Michelle Finn
- First issue: May 2005
- Company: Emerald Expositions
- Country: USA
- Based in: Cincinnati, Ohio
- Website: http://www.boutiquedesign.com/

Boutique Design magazine is a trade publication produced by ST Media Group International. As the only hospitality interiors magazine that focuses specifically on boutique hospitality, Boutique Design (BD) is the authority on the boutique hotel, spa and restaurant market. About designers and for designers, BD features major hospitality projects, industry news and products which are relevant to the industry in each of its bi-monthly issues. The publication debuted in spring, 2005.

BD also produces Boutique Design New York (BDNY), a hospitality interiors show that runs concurrently with the International Hotel, Motel + Restaurant Show at the Javits Center in New York. Over 750 exhibitors representing high-end, unique and innovative design products—including furniture, lighting, wall coverings, fabric, seating, accessories, artwork, carpet and flooring, materials, bath and spa – are presented in small-scale displays, creating an intimate, boutique-style shopping environment.

The event also includes education sessions, presented by BD and its sister publication Hospitality Style; design forums; special show floor exhibits; and the presentation of the annual Boutique Design Awards.

Each spring, Boutique Design names a list of up-and-coming hospitality interior designers known as The Boutique 18.
