= Panorama Towers =

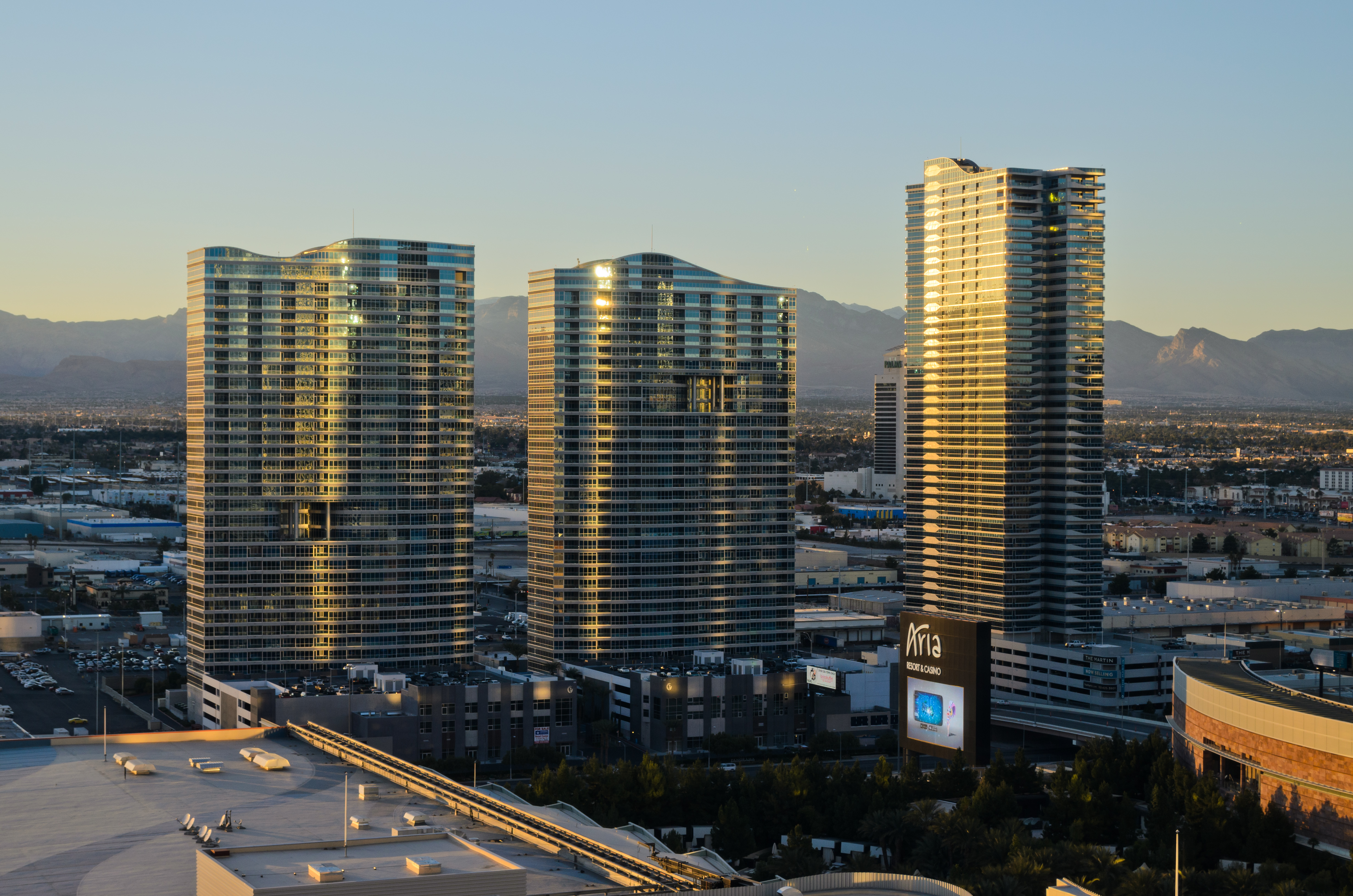
- Panorama Towers at sunset
- Interactive map of the Panorama Towers area

General information
- Status: Completed
- Type: Luxury high-rise condominium complex
- Groundbreaking: October 2004
- Opening: December 2006
- Cost: $600 million
- Owner: Panorama Towers HOA
- Management: RMI Management, LLC

Height
- Height: 420 ft (130 m)

Technical details
- Floor count: 33

Design and construction
- Architect: Klai Juba Architects
- Developer: Laurence Hallier and Andrew Sasson
- Structural engineer: Lochsa Engineering
- Main contractor: M.J. Dean Construction, Inc

Other information
- Number of units: 650

Website
- Panorama Towers Las Vegas

Panorama Towers is a high-rise condominium complex located in Paradise, Nevada. Developed by Laurence Hallier and Andrew Sasson, the $600 million aqua-blue glass 635-unit complex sits on 8.5 acres (3.4 ha) on Dean Martin Drive and is centrally located across from the Las Vegas Strip one-quarter mile (0.40 km) from CityCenter.

The complex consists of two towers, completed in 2006 and 2007. A third tower was completed in 2008 and was later rebranded as The Martin in 2011. A fourth tower had been planned but was never built.

== History ==
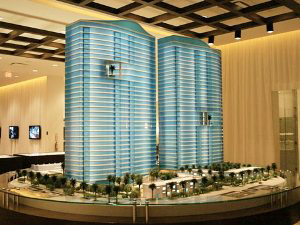
Early model design of Panorama Towers

Panorama Towers was announced on September 7, 2003, as a business venture between partners Andrew Sasson and Laurence Hallier, who owned Sasson/Hallier Development LLC. The project was announced as a 250-unit condominium complex that would stand 30 stories high and would be built on 10.5 acres (4.2 ha) of land. Las Vegas-based architecture firm Klai Juba was hired to design the project. Klai Juba's iconic aqua-blue glass towers have been nominated and won numerous awards from the design, construction and excellence service of the complex. Among the many honours, was The Best of Las Vegas' architecture award by the editors of the Las Vegas Review-Journal, and "High-Rise of the Year" by the Community Associations Institute. Sasson described the target clientele as local residents who enjoy high-end design, and the ideal central location of being only a block from the heart of the Las Vegas Strip, which he labeled as Las Vegas' beachfront. The project was named for its panoramic views of the Las Vegas Strip and of Red Rock Canyon.

Sales for a second tower had begun by July 2004. By September 2004, construction was underway on one of the towers. That month, a 35-story third tower, standing 500 feet (150 m) tall, was approved by Clark County. The third tower would be slightly smaller than the other two towers, with only 250 units compared to 350 for the others. The second tower was scheduled to begin construction in January 2005, with construction on the third tower scheduled to begin six months later. During construction, actors Leonardo DiCaprio and Tobey Maguire purchased units at Panorama Towers. DiCaprio also attended the groundbreaking ceremony, held in October 2004.

Construction on the first two towers was underway in April 2005, at which point a lawsuit was filed against The Related Companies by Sasson/Hallier. The two companies had previously negotiated a possible joint venture for the Panorama Towers project, and Sasson/Hallier provided various database information – including contracts, financials, and marketing information – to Related as part of the negotiations. Ultimately, negotiations failed, and Sasson/Hallier alleged that Related kept the database information to develop and market its proposed Icon condominium project.

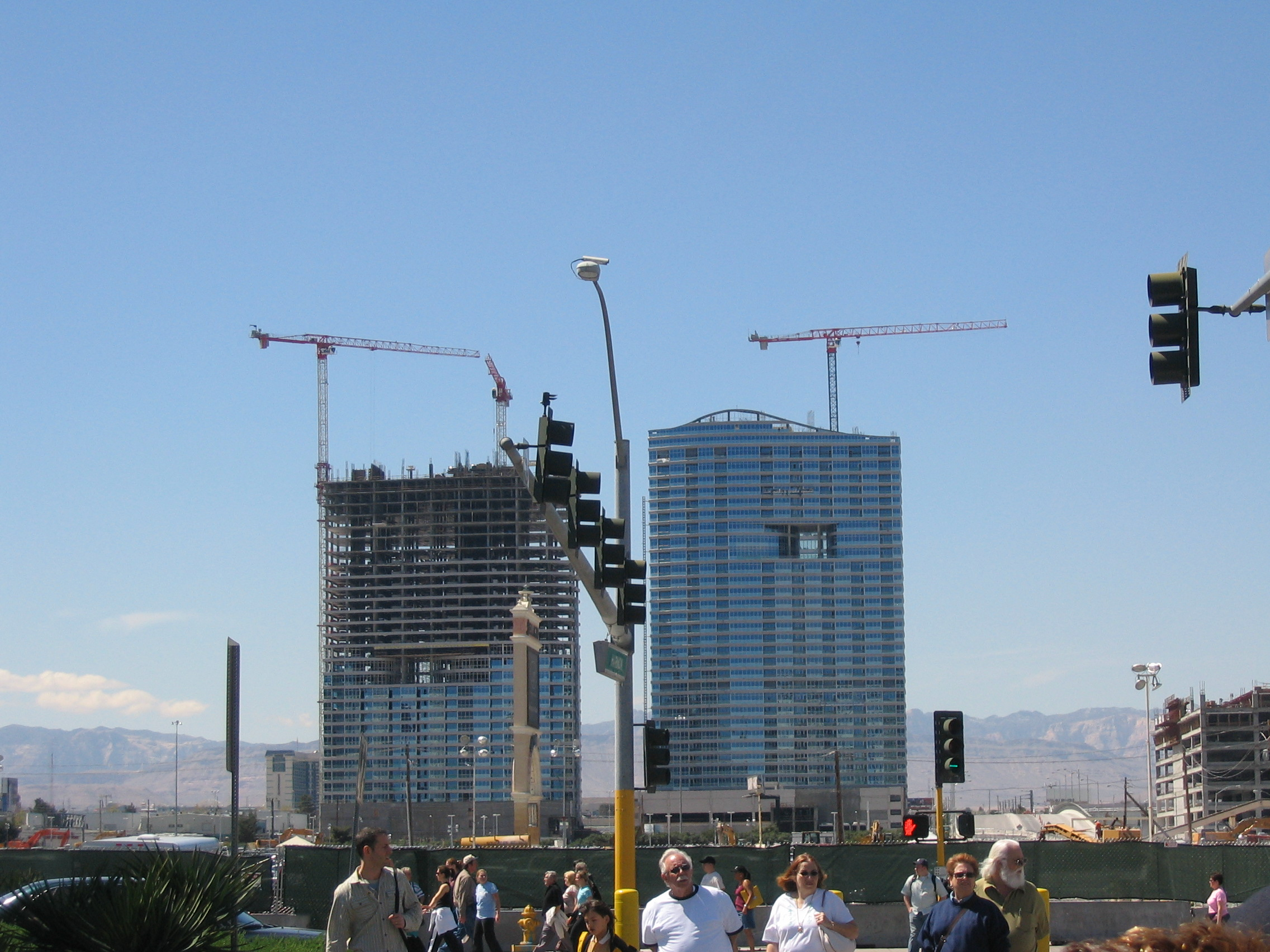
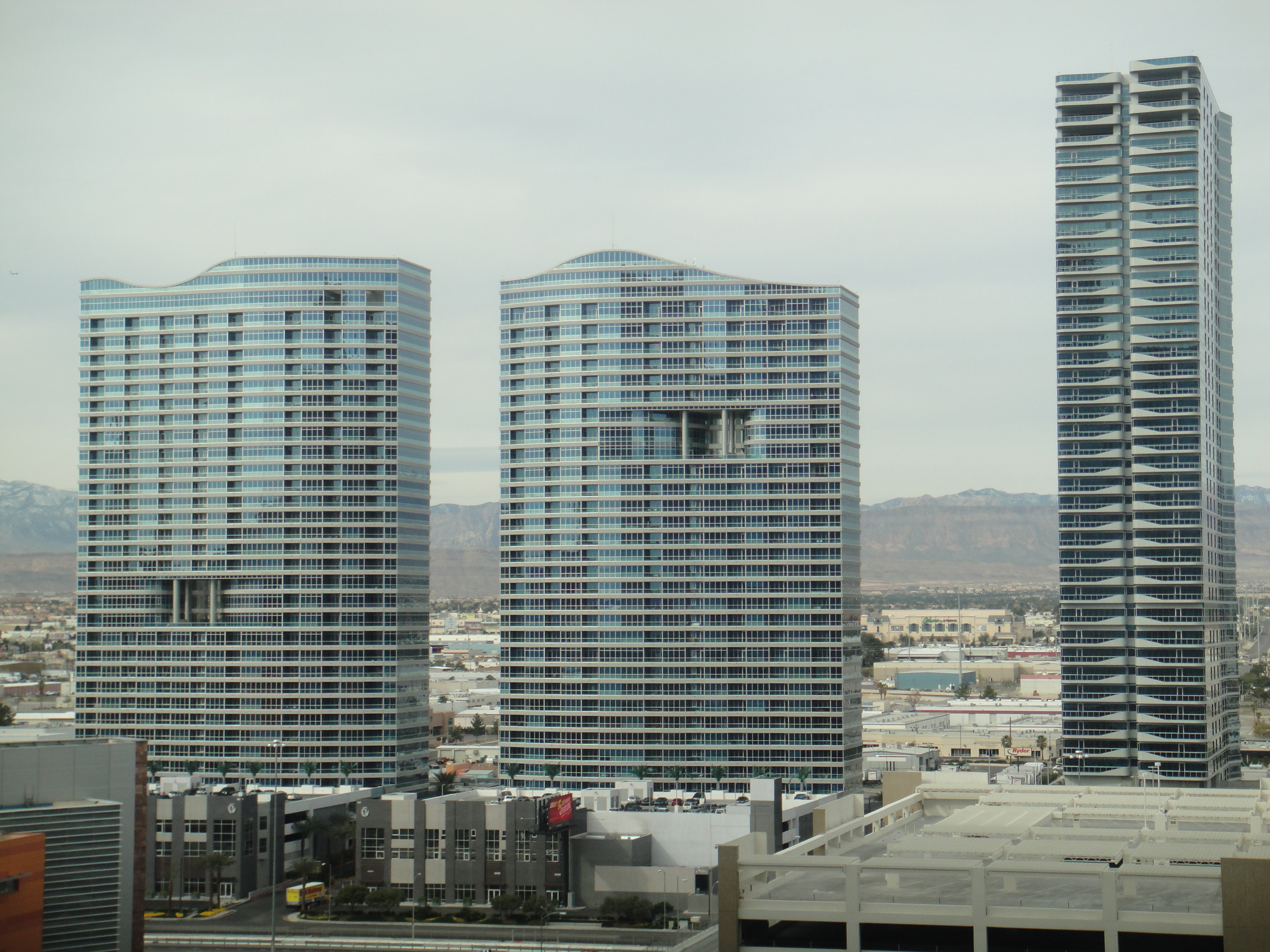
Panorama Towers during and after construction

By March 2006, a fourth tower was being planned. The fourth tower was to be constructed south of the property, and was to stand 44 stories tall. A groundbreaking ceremony for the third tower was held on April 21, 2006. Pamela Anderson appeared at the event as Hallier's date. Anderson, who referred to the project as "Pamorama", was to become a resident in the future fourth tower and said she would hire David LaChapelle to design her new residence. At that time, the first tower – standing 33 stories, with 308 units – was 90 percent complete, with an expected opening in July 2006, approximately six months later than initially planned. The second tower had been topped off at that time, and was scheduled for completion in January 2007.

M.J. Dean Construction was the general contractor for the first and second tower, while Taylor International was the general contractor for the third tower, which was constructed north of Harmon Avenue and the other two towers. The first tower opened in December 2006, while the second tower – with 326 units – was scheduled to open in summer 2007. The first and second tower were constructed at an estimated cost of $300 million.

In April 2007, a Vice President of Sales for the project said there was no timetable for developing the fourth tower due to the local high-rise market becoming questionable. The second tower opened in late 2007. In January 2008, Hallier said that the second tower had sold 98 percent of its 320 units. The third tower, Panorama North, was completed in 2008. In 2009, Hallier listed his unfinished three-level, 7,000 sq ft (650 m^{2}) "chairman's penthouse" in the first tower for sale, at a price of $2.8 million. In 2011, Panorama North was spun off as a separate property renamed The Martin.

In February 2011, Anderson sued Hallier, alleging that he reneged on a promise to build her a condominium unit at Panorama Towers. In June 2011, Hallier filed a counter-complaint against Anderson, claiming that she was in breach of a 2006 agreement in which she was to make numerous promotional appearances to help market Panorama Towers. Hallier said Anderson's promised condominium unit was contingent on her appearances, which he said she failed to do. Hallier sued Anderson for $22.5 million, the total price of the unsold units that Anderson was to promote. In January 2012, Hallier and Anderson settled out of court as part of an undisclosed deal.

In 2013, the unfinished 14,176 sq ft (1,317.0 m^{2}) penthouse in the second tower sold for $3.9 million. As of 2013, Panorama Towers was patrolled by an 80-camera security system and two dozen security personnel, and utilized fingerprint security scanners.

== Value ==
Initial condominium prices ranged from $270,000 to $1 million during the pre-construction phase. Even after facing the worst real estate market in the city's history, Panorama Towers has rebounded with one of highest appreciation rates in the region. The units have regained a significant amount of their value with prices nearly doubled over the final six months of 2011.

== Gallery ==
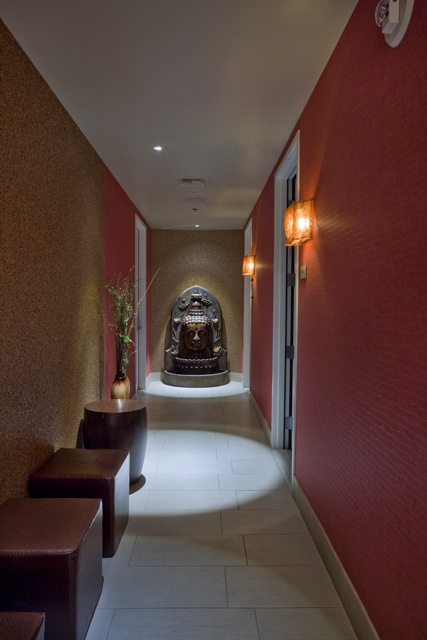
Entrance to one of the spa facilities

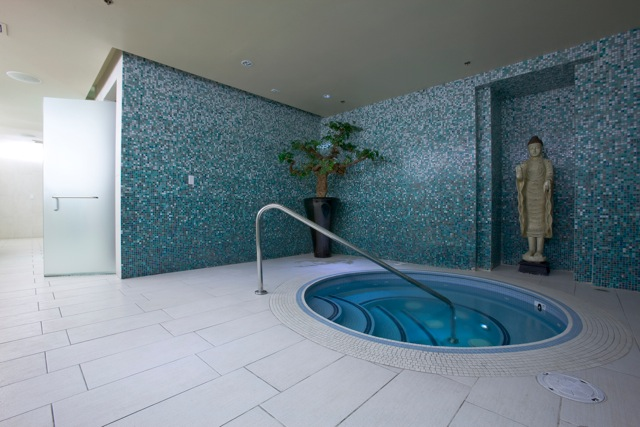
One of the hot tubs located in the spas

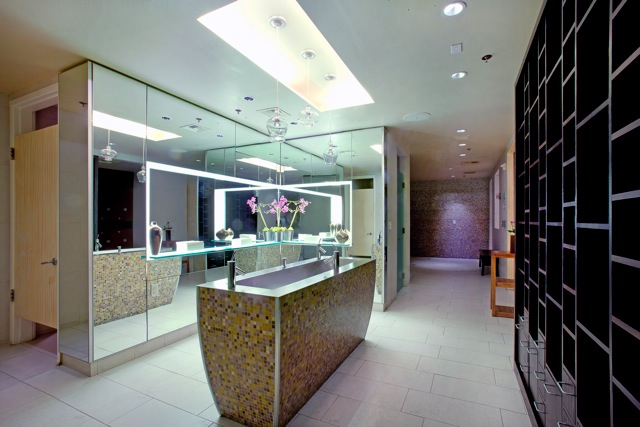
One of the sauna rooms

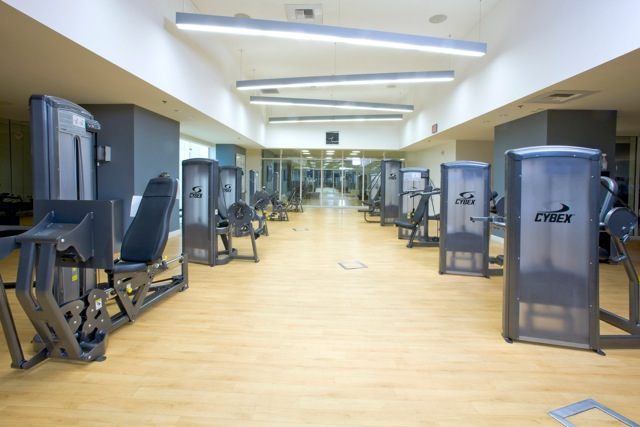
Fitness center

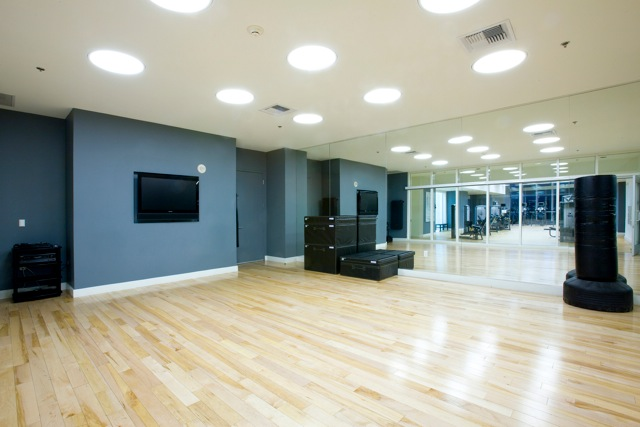
The yoga and pilates studio

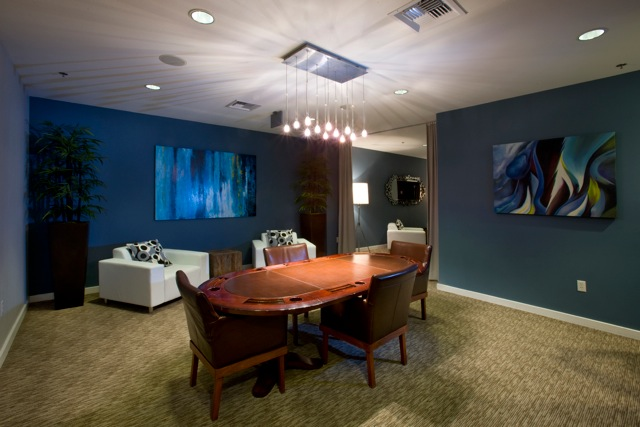
One of the poker rooms

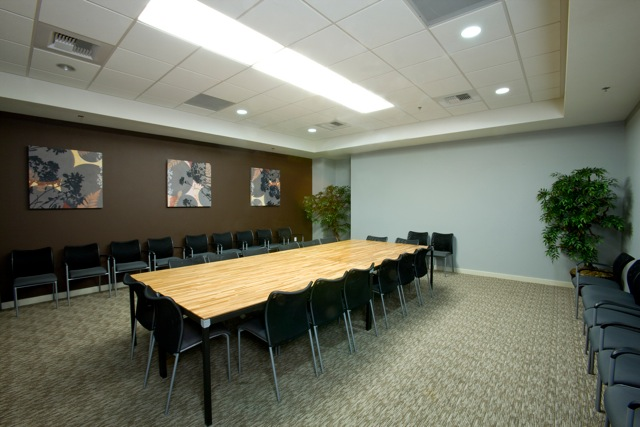
One of the conference rooms

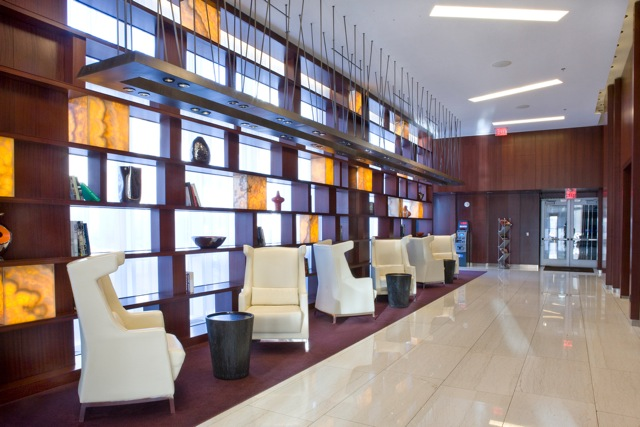
Lobby

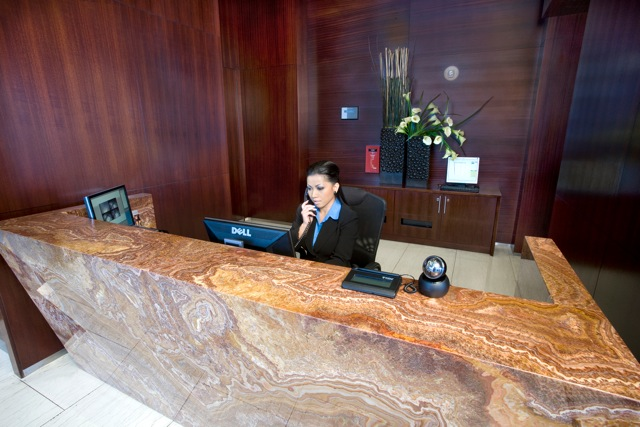
One of the 24-hour concierge desks

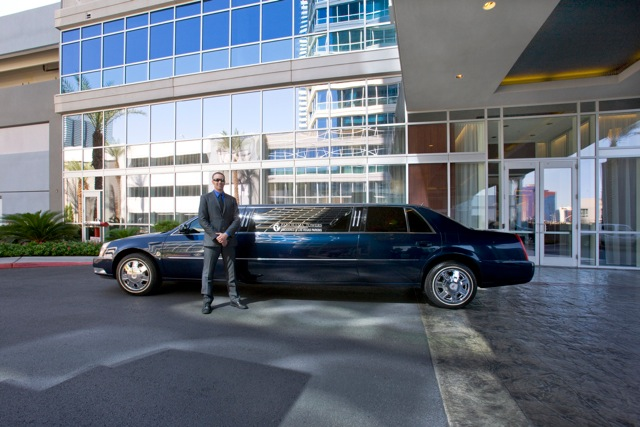
One of the limousines for residents

== See also ==
- List of tallest buildings in Las Vegas
