= W New York Downtown Hotel and Residences =

Skyscraper in Manhattan, New York

W New York - Downtown Hotel and Residences
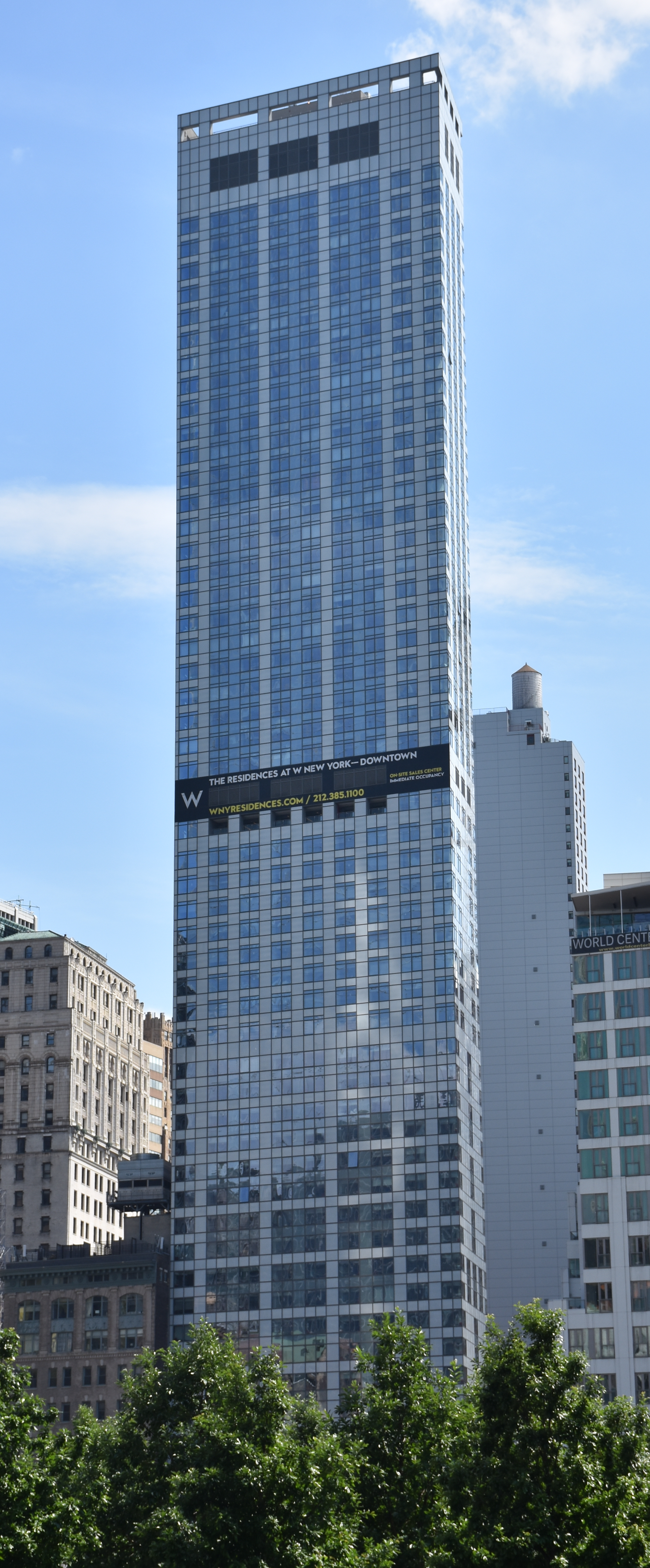
- Interactive map of the W New York - Downtown Hotel and Residences area

General information
- Status: Completed
- Type: Hotel, Residential
- Location: 8 Albany Street; Manhattan, New York City 10006
- Coordinates: 40.70928°N 74.013852°W
- Construction started: 2006
- Completed: 2010
- Opening: 2010

Height
- Roof: 192 m (630 ft)

Technical details
- Floor count: 58
- Floor area: 40,877 m^{2} (439,996 ft^{2})

Design and construction
- Architect: Gwathmey Siegel & Associates
- Developer: Monian Group
- Main contractor: Tishman Construction

W New York - Downtown Hotel and Residences is a 630-foot-tall building (190 m) at 8 Albany Street in the Financial District of Lower Manhattan in New York City. The 58-story building was completed in 2010, and is tied with two other buildings, Home Insurance Plaza and the W.R. Grace Building as the 106th tallest building in New York. It is divided between a 217-room hotel, on floors 5-22, and 223 luxury residential condominiums, on floors 23–56, with lobbies for both on floors 1–4. There is a residential observation deck on the 57th floor, with views of the Hudson River, and a terrace on the 58th floor with panoramic views of lower Manhattan.

The building was designed by Gwathmey Siegel & Associates, and the interior was by Graft's Los Angeles office. The developer is the Moinian group, founded by Joseph Moinian. The hotel opened on August 18, 2010.

In 2010, the building was featured in a HGTV contest in which a $1.5 million apartment was given to the winner as a prize.

In July 2020, it was announced that the hotel would close on October 13, 2020, due to the COVID-19 pandemic; the residential units remained open but lost access to the hotel's amenities.

== See also ==
- 3 Hudson Boulevard
