= Make It Right Foundation =

American non-profit organization

- Foundation's logo
- Founded: December 2007
- Founder: Brad Pitt
- Type: 501(c)(3) charitable organization
- Tax ID no.: 26-0723027
- Purpose: Redevelopment of the Lower 9th Ward, by building a neighborhood with safe and healthy homes.
- Location: New Orleans
- Region served: New Orleans, LA; Newark, NJ; Kansas City, MO
- Products: Low cost housing
- Revenue: ▲US $11,921,161
- Expenses: ▲US $9,646,135
- Employees: <24

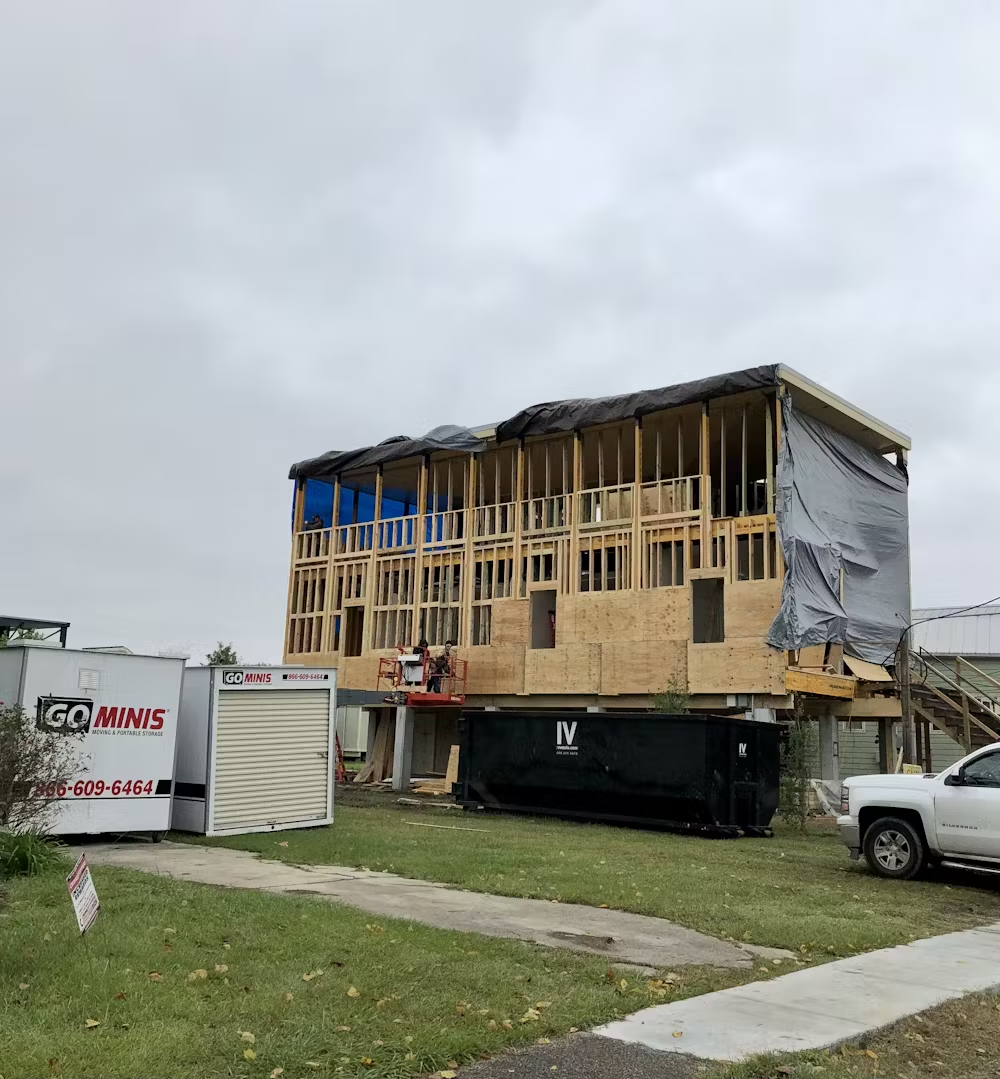
A Make It Right Foundation home undergoing major structural repairs in 2018

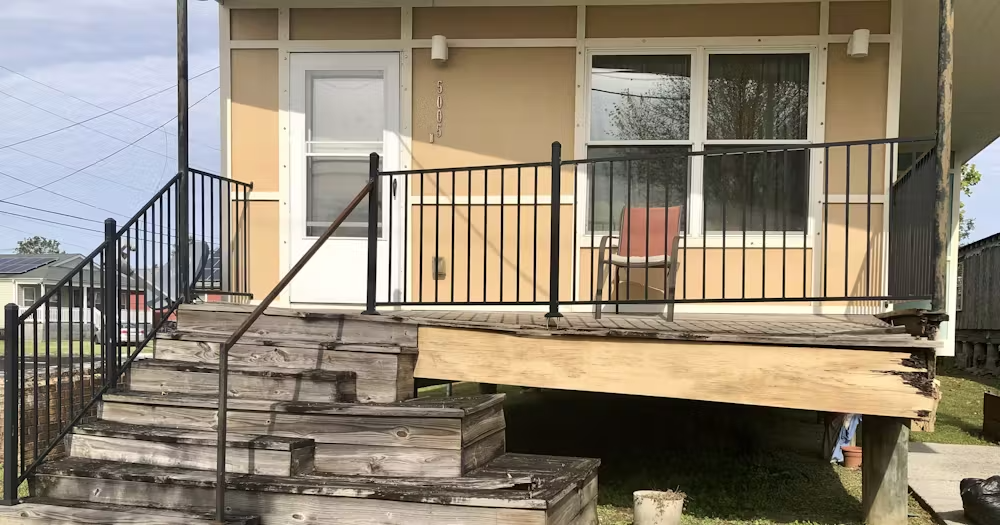
A Make It Right Foundation home’s front porch, which was crumbling and collapsing in 2021

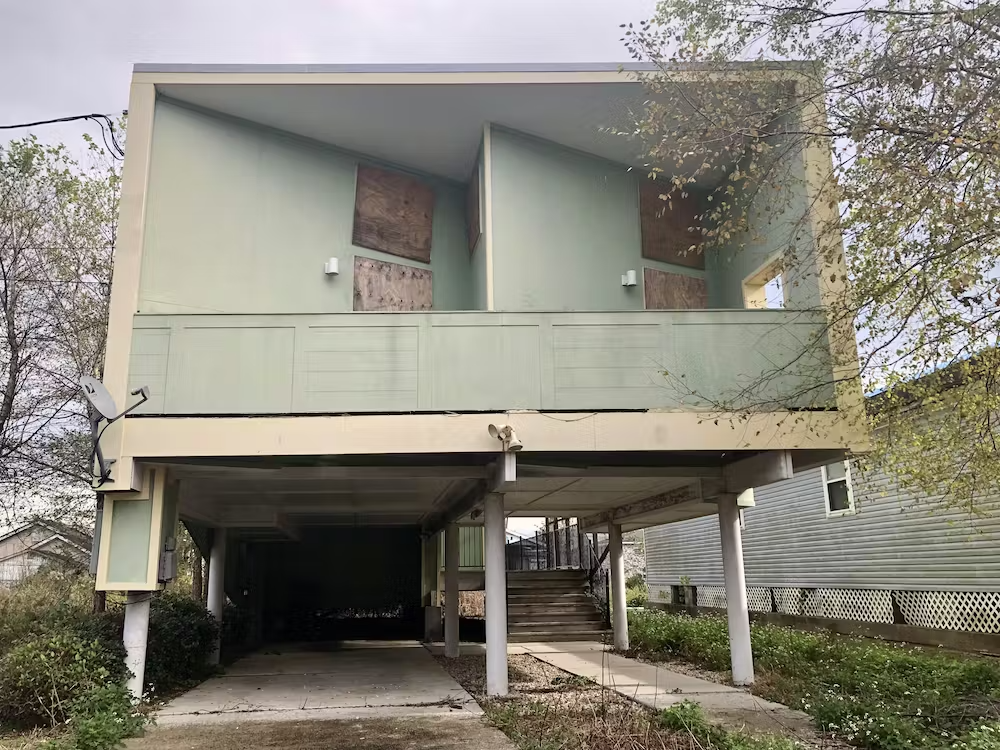
A Make It Right Foundation home in 2021, vacant and boarded up

The Make It Right Foundation is a non-profit foundation founded by American actor Brad Pitt in 2007 after Hurricane Katrina to rebuild houses in the Lower Ninth Ward of New Orleans in an environmentally friendly way. The organization also built structures in the American cities of Newark, New Jersey, and Kansas City, Missouri.

By 2015, the foundation had built 109 homes for a total construction cost of US$26.8 million, or nearly US$250,000 per home, according to the foundation's tax filings. The homes were sold for US$150,000.

The development became a tourist attraction.

In 2018, various residents of the foundation's homes filed suit against Make It Right, alleging that the non-profit built and sold houses with "defective" materials that caused electrical and plumbing malfunctions, with insufficient ventilation, and with other structural issues. As of early 2022, reports stated that only 6 of the original 109 homes built remained in "reasonably good shape," with many rendered uninhabitable, plagued by construction errors and mold issues.

In 2022, "a source close to Brad Pitt" told the British newspaper The Guardian that "Brad got involved at the beginning to help the people of the Lower Ninth Ward, and obviously it was upsetting to see what had happened once he had stepped back from the project and others took over."

In 2022, Global Green USA agreed to pay $20.5 million to homeowners to settle a class action lawsuit. However, as of 2023, Global Green said they could not afford to pay the settlement.

== History ==
In December 2007, Brad Pitt and William McDonough, together with Graft Architects, founded Make It Right to rebuild 150 safe, energy-efficient and affordable homes for families from New Orleans Lower 9th Ward who lost everything to Hurricane Katrina. The foundation was advised on formation by Trevor Neilson and Nina Killeen, advisors to the Jolie-Pitt Foundation through their firm, Global Philanthropy Group.

On March 10, 2012, at the Hyatt Regency New Orleans, Pitt and Ellen DeGeneres hosted "A Night to Make It Right" with Drew Brees and Randy Jackson and performances by Rihanna, Sheryl Crow, Seal, Kanye West, Snoop Dogg, and Dr. John. Make It Right raised $5 million at the event, according to the New Orleans Times-Picayune. Over 1,200 attendees paid between $1,000 and $2,500 to dine on a meal created by celebrity chefs Emeril Lagasse and John Besh. A silent auction was also held to raise funds. The organization was bolstered by support from celebrities, such as Oprah Winfrey.

By March 2013, Make It Right had completed 90 of the proposed 150 homes. The homes in New Orleans were designed by renowned architects such as Frank Gehry, David Adjaye, and Shigeru Ban, and each home was LEED Platinum certified by the USGBC.

With their angular shapes and bold colors, the Make It Right houses were not typical of New Orleans. The organization implemented the holistic, eco-conscious Cradle to Cradle method of building, promising certifiably green construction that would benefit the homeowner. The homes were said to use 70% less energy than a conventional home of the same size. It took about $150,000 to build these homes, labor included. If the costs exceeded the estimated price, the foundation would cover the difference.

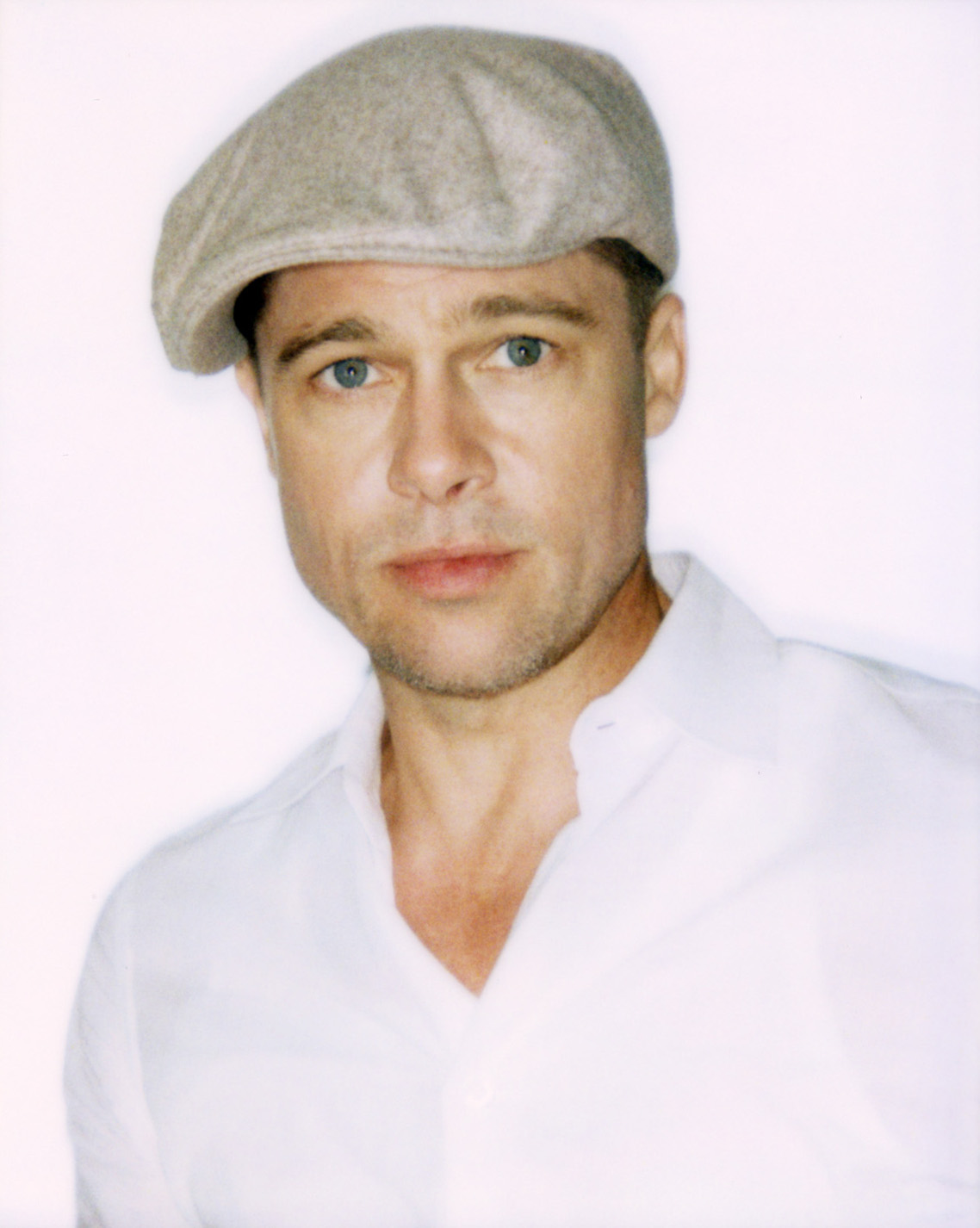
Photographic portrait of Brad Pitt from Blake Nelson Boyd's "Louisiana Cereal"

Projects went beyond New Orleans. Make It Right partnered with HelpUSA in Newark, NJ to build a 56-unit multi-family building for disabled veterans. The LEED Platinum building opened on Memorial Day in May 2012. In Kansas City, Missouri, Make It Right converted a school into 50 affordable rental units.

== Decay problems, structural issues, and lawsuits ==
Beginning by at least 2013, the foundation has reached settlements with residents of its houses over problems including inadequate ventilation, mold, and rotting wood that caused illnesses in residents. Some of the agreements included non-disclosure agreements.

In early January 2014, the foundation was criticized after over two dozen of the New Orleans homes began to rot. The foundation reported that the homes used special wood products called TimberSIL which is advertised as free from many of toxic ingredients. The wood was unable to withstand the humidity in the city of New Orleans. The foundation announced they were prepared to pursue all legal remedies if necessary. In 2015, the foundation sued the manufacturer for nearly $500,000, the alleged cost of replacing rotting decks on 39 of the 109 built houses. In 2017, the suit was settled for an undisclosed amount.

In 2018, the first of the several class-action lawsuits against the foundation were filed by residents of the New Orleans Make It Right homes who complained that many of the homes were rotting and dangerous. The founder of the Lower 9th Ward Homeowners Association, Linda Jackson, was quoted in 2018 as saying that the majority of the foundation's homes were then vacant. Residents complained of mold and collapsing structures, electrical fires, and gas leaks. The residents said the houses were built too quickly, with low-quality materials, and that the designs did not take into account New Orleans’ humid, rainy climate. Also, it was reported that Make It Right had not built a home, filed tax forms, or updated its website since 2015. NBC News said that the foundation had "all but disappeared" with its downtown New Orleans office had been closed and staff had been cut to a handful, and with residents saying their calls went unreturned.

In October 2020, a Make It Right house designed by David Adjaye was ordered by the city government of New Orleans to be demolished, after the city decided the home was "in imminent danger of collapse and/or threat to life". In early 2022, only 6 of the 109 Make It Right houses remained in what an urban-studies researcher deemed to be "reasonably good shape."

In 2022, the foundation paid $20.5 million to homeowners to settle a class action lawsuit. Global Green USA agreed to advance the US$20.5 million to the Make It Right Foundation and to oversee the distribution of the funds. Global Green's CEO William Bridge was quoted by The Times-Picayune newspaper as saying that Global Green "had a great relationship with Make It Right and Brad Pitt" and that his organization's board of directors' goal was "to plug it (the money) back into the community."

== See also ==
- Reconstruction of New Orleans
