= Melilla Seafront Promenade =

Promenade in Melilla, Spain

- Paseo Marítimo de Melilla
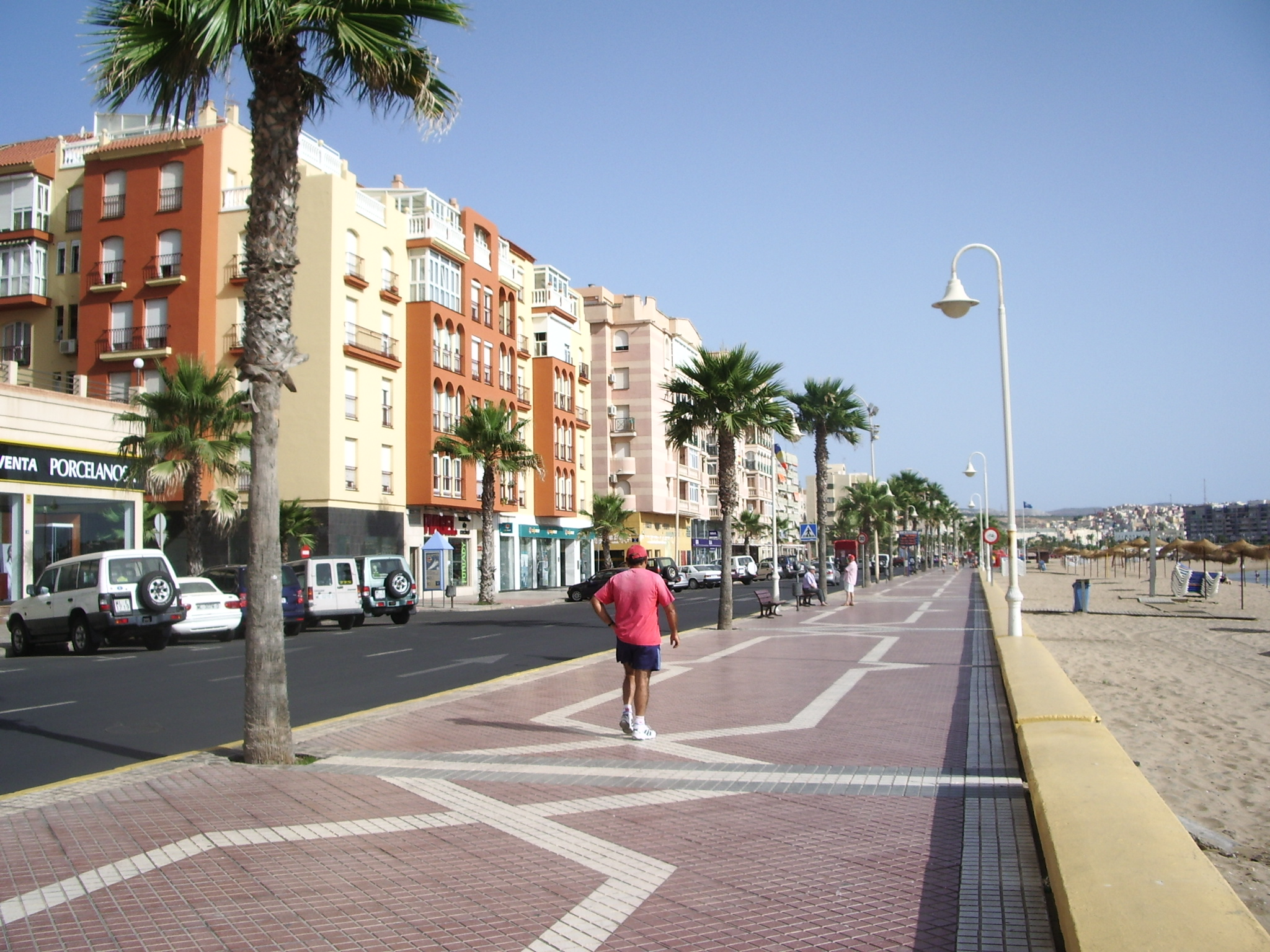
- View of the Melilla seafront
- Interactive map of Melilla Seafront Promenade
- Type: Promenade
- Length: Approximately 2 kilometers Reformed in 2022
- Tourist routes: Yes
- Location: Melilla, Spain
- Quarter: Barrio del Industrial, Zona Centro
- Coordinates: 35°17′36″N 02°56′02″W
- West end: Barrio del Industrial
- Major junctions: Av. Antonio Diez, access to Noray Marina
- East end: Puerto Deportivo / Plaza del Consejo de Europa
- South: Mediterranean Sea

Construction
- Inauguration: 1990s (renovations in 2022)

Other
- Known for: Sculptures such as Las Venus de Arruf and Encuentros
- Status: Active

The Seafront Promenade, officially named Mayor Francisco Mir Berlanga Seafront Promenade, is a coastal avenue that runs along a large part of the coastline of the Spanish city of Melilla. This urban space is one of the most representative and frequented areas of the city, both by residents and visitors, combining scenic, sculptural, and recreational value.

== History ==
Its origin dates back to the 1960s, when the first works began to urbanize the southern coast and facilitate access to the sea. Over time, it has undergone several renovations and expansions, adapting to the needs of the population and improving its accessibility and aesthetics. At the end of the 20th century, it was extended towards the city center after a bridge was built over the Río de Oro, with a section named Alcalde Rafael Ginel. In 2022, an important renovation was completed on the right bank of the promenade, between the Industrial neighborhood and the new Post Office facilities. This project, with an investment close to 500,000 euros, included pavement renewal, improvements in sanitation and electrical networks, and the removal of architectural barriers for people with reduced mobility.

== Features ==
The promenade stands out for its width, ornamental vegetation (mainly palm trees), and pedestrian areas. It is a popular place for walking, sports practice, and outdoor activities. This promenade is ideal for strolling and enjoying the marine landscape and public art, offering a relaxation space for residents and visitors. The recent renovation has reinforced its accessible character, prioritizing pedestrian mobility and urban integration.

== Artistic elements ==
Along the Seafront Promenade there are several sculptures and pieces of urban art that are part of Melilla's cultural heritage:

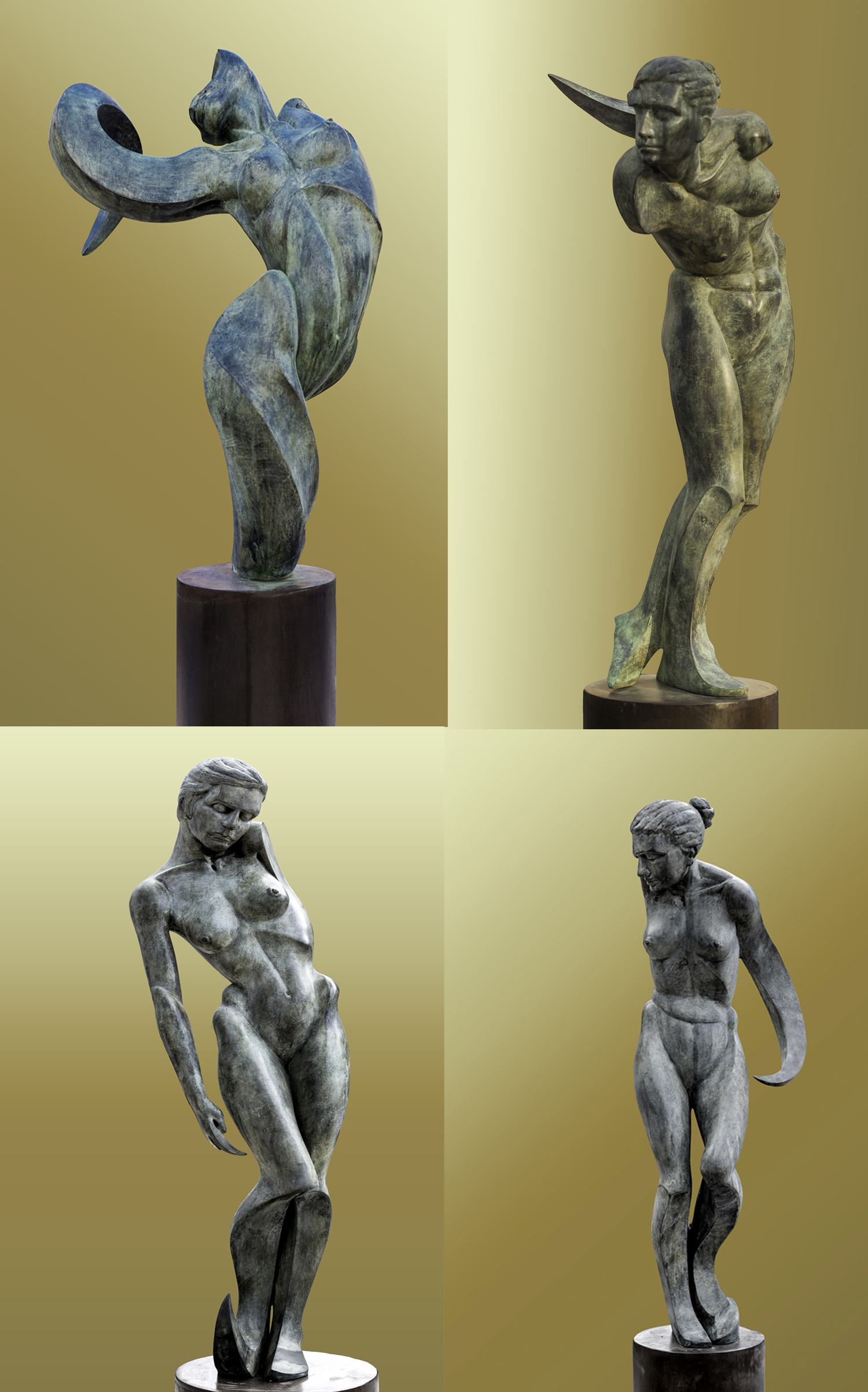
- Las Venus de Arruf
  Las Venus de Arruf: a sculptural set of ten bronze pieces created by artist Mustafa Arruf and installed in 2002. They represent female figures of classical inspiration. They were restored and relocated in 2018 after being temporarily removed in 2017.
- Encuentros: monumental sculpture located in the Plaza del Consejo de Europa. It was inaugurated in 1997 on the occasion of the 5th centenary of the Spanish foundation of Melilla. It consists of two figures made of corten steel and bronze, 10 and 12 meters tall, by Mustafa Arruf.

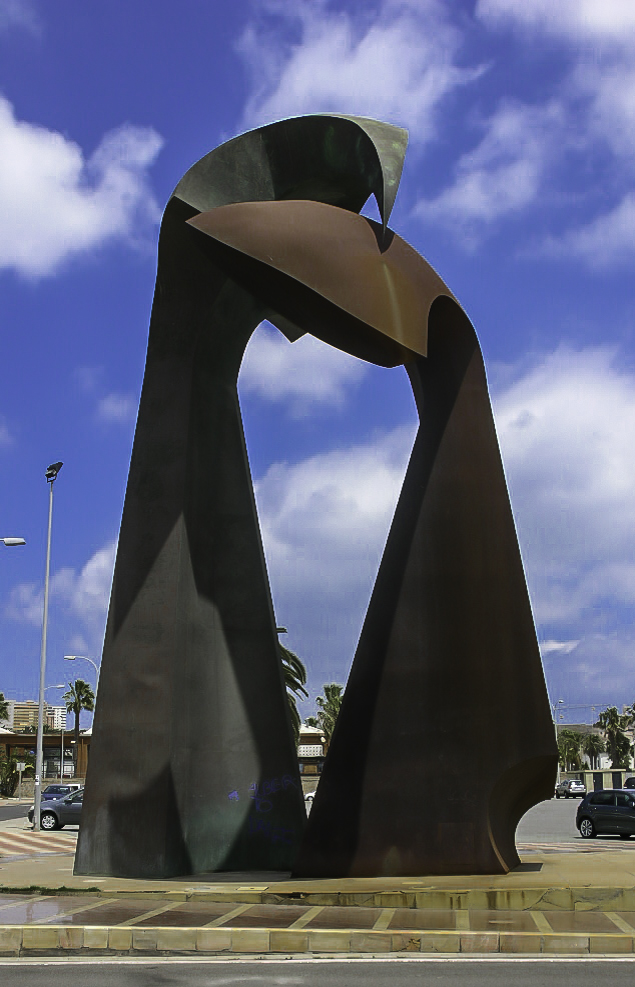
Encuentros

- Mural of Fernando Meliveo Reynaldo: polychrome tile work installed on the Alcalde Rafael Ginel Seafront Promenade, recently restored by the Melilla Port Authority in 2024.
- Torres V Centenario is the tallest building in the city, housing several institutions including courts.

== Surroundings and points of interest ==
The Seafront Promenade connects with several key infrastructures and areas of interest in the city:

- Real Club Marítimo de Melilla
- Noray Marina of Melilla
- San Lorenzo Beach, one of the most central and frequented beaches in Melilla.
- Carabos Beach
- Hipodromo Beach
- Hipica Beach
- South Dike Promenade

== Other seafront promenades in Melilla ==
The seafront promenades are an essential part of the urban design. They are interconnected and allow continuous routes along much of the city's coast, both on foot and by bicycle. Along the way, there are rest areas, green spaces, and sea views, making them a resource for daily commuting and recreational use by residents and visitors.

=== Horcas Coloradas Seafront Promenade ===
This promenade is located in the northern area of Melilla, along the coast, and extends about 2 kilometers. It is one of the most frequented areas, especially due to its proximity to Horcas Coloradas Beach, one of the most popular beaches in the city. The beach is 400 meters long and has an average width of 40 meters, having been awarded the Blue Flag in 2015.

Recently, the promenade has been adapted for pedestrian use, promoting outdoor activities and facilitating social distancing. This transformation also helps improve accessibility and enjoyment of the maritime environment.
