= Eco-Schools =

Eco-Schools Green Flag

Eco-Schools is an international programme of the Foundation for Environmental Education (FEE) that aims to “empower students to be the change our sustainable world needs by engaging them in fun, action-orientated, and socially responsible learning.”

Each school follows a seven step change process and aims to “empowers young people to lead processes and actions wherever they can.”

Over time and through commitment to the Eco-Schools Seven Step process, improvements will be seen in both the learning outcomes, attitude, and behaviour of students and the local community, and ultimately the local environment. Evidence of success in these areas will eventually lead to a school being awarded with the International Green Flag.

Eco-Schools is one of the programmes recognised by the UN Decade of Education for Sustainable Development (2005 – 2014), awarding certificates to thousands of schools around the world.

The Eco-Schools programme extends from kindergartens to universities and is implemented in 67 countries, involving 51,000 schools and institutions, and over 19,000,000 students. It is the largest international network of teachers and students in the world. FEE EcoCampus is the name of the programme at university level.

== History ==
The programme was developed in 1992 in response to the need to involve young people in environmental projects at the local level as identified at the United Nations Conference on Environment and Development of 1992.

Eco-Schools was launched in 1994 in Denmark, Germany, Greece and the United Kingdom with the support of the European Commission. When the Foundation for Environmental Education became global in 2001, countries outside of Europe began joining the Eco-Schools programme as well. South Africa was the first country to do so.

In 2003 Eco-Schools was identified by the United Nations Environment Programme (UNEP) as a model initiative for Education for Sustainable Development.

=== When countries joined Eco-Schools ===
1992	Denmark
1994	England, Germany, Northern Ireland, Scotland, Wales
1995	Greece, Turkey
1996	Bulgaria, Cyprus, Portugal, Slovenia, Spain, Sweden
1997	Ireland
1998	Croatia, Finland, Italy, Norway
1999	Romania
2000	Hungary
2001	Iceland, South Africa
2002	Malta, Russia
2003	Kenya, Latvia, Netherlands, South Africa
2004	Lithuania, Slovakia
2005	Czech Republic, France, Poland, Canada
2006	Kazakhstan, Morocco, Puerto Rico
2007	FYR Macedonia
2008	Belgium-Flanders, Brazil, Dominican Republic, Japan
2009	Bahamas, China, Jordan, Uganda, USA
2010	Iran
2011	Malaysia, Mongolia
2012	Mexico, Serbia, United Arab Emirates
2013	Singapore
2014	Australia, Bermuda, Ghana, India
2015	Indian Ocean States
2016	Belgium-Wallonia, Estonia, Montenegro, Switzerland, Tanzania, Thailand, Ukraine, US Virgin Islands
2017	Comoros, Madagascar, Mauritius, South Korea, Zanzibar

== Methodology ==
Eco-Schools in South Africa

The International Eco-Schools Programme takes a holistic, participatory approach to learning for sustainability. The aim of the programme is to engage students through classroom study, school and community action to raise awareness of sustainable development issues. It encourages students and teachers to conduct research on the amount of waste, energy or water use at their school and work towards making it a more sustainable environment. Eco-Schools provides an integrated system for the environmental management of schools and involve all stakeholders in this process.

The whole schools approach embedded in the Eco-Schools programme emphasizes the importance of an ongoing focus on the issues linked to environmental, climate, and sustainability issues.

The programme's methodology consists of Seven Steps that the school needs to adopt:

Step 1 Establishment of the Eco-Schools Committee
Step 2 Environmental review
Step 3 Action Plan
Step 4 Monitoring and Evaluation
Step 5 Curriculum Linking
Step 6 Informing and involving the wider community
Step 7 Eco Code

Schools are encouraged to work on eleven Themes, which are as follows: Biodiversity & Nature, Climate Change, Energy, Global Citizenship, Health & Wellbeing, Litter, Marine and Coast, School Grounds, Transport, Waste, and Water.

== Participation and awards ==
Any school may participate in the scheme by registering with the FEE member organisation in their country. Once registered, each school must review and improve their impact on the environment, and in recognition of their commitment and progress, they can then apply for an award.

Successful Eco-Schools are awarded the International Green Flag, an internationally acknowledged symbol for environmental excellence. In some countries, this recognition happens through a three level system, where schools are awarded either bronze and silver awards before receiving the International Green Flag.

There is flexibility to the ceremony and awarding process but the criteria for assessing schools for the award must follow the guidelines of FEE's International Eco-Schools programme.

== Process ==
To qualify for an award the school must follow the following programme:

- Register – usually done by an adult (teacher or parent).
- Eco-Schools Committee – a group of pupils and adults – some elected by their peers are assembled to manage the process.
- Environmental Review – the Eco-Schools Committee must organise the school to carry out a review of the school's energy and water usage, waste production and state of the school grounds with respect to litter.
- Action Plan – formed from issues identified by the review
- Eco Code – the Eco-Schools Committee, with the participation of the whole school must develop a mission statement to be prominently advertised inside and outside the school.
- Link to Curriculum and Take Action – demonstrable progress must be made in three areas of the curriculum and involve as much of the school as possible.
- Monitor and Review – the Eco-Schools Committee must record and analyse the progress made

After these processes are complete, the school can apply for one of the awards mentioned above, ultimately dependent on the level of environmental progress made.

== FEE EcoCampus ==
The FEE EcoCampus programme is an evolution of the Eco-Schools programme. It targets students in third-level education in various countries and is implemented in the same way as Eco-Schools. The only real difference is that students devise an Eco Charter instead of an Eco Code.
This Charter is a document which is a guide to environmental management on site.

EcoCampus began in Russia in 2003 and the first whole institution Green Flags were awarded in Ireland in 2010, to University College Cork.

== Eco-Schools Partners and Sponsors ==
- United Nations Environment Programme (UNEP)
- United Nations Educational, Scientific and Cultural Organization (UNESCO)
- Earth Charter International
- TheGoals.org
- The Environmental Association for Universities and Colleges (EAUC)
- The Global Action Programme (GAP) on Education for Sustainable Development
- The Wrigley Company Foundation
- Toyota Fund for Europe
- eTwinning
- Alcoa
- Podio

== Global Forest Fund ==
Eco-Schools compensates for their CO_{2} emissions from their flight travels when they go to, for example, conferences and National Operator Meetings through the Global Forest Fund. FEE has established the Global Forest Fund to help minimise the effects of CO_{2} emissions from the increased travel activity worldwide. The Fund supports schools and organisations by funding CO_{2} compensation efforts such as planting trees and environmental education activities.

== Links ==
Eco-Schools is a programme of the Foundation for Environmental Education (FEE). FEE is a non-governmental, non-profit organisation promoting sustainable development through environmental education, and is active in five programmes; Blue Flag, Young Reporters for the Environment (YRE), Learning about Forests (LEAF), Green Key International and Eco-Schools.

FEE is an international umbrella organisation with members in 76 countries worldwide.

== Research ==
1. Jelle Boeve-de Pauw & Peter Van Petegem (2017). Eco-school evaluation beyond labels: the impact of environmental policy, didactics and nature at school on student outcomes, Environmental Education Research, DOI: 10.1080/13504622.2017.1307327
2. HGSE Global Education Innovation Initiative Book 3: Case Studies from 50 Global Examples of Teaching and Learning in the 21st Century. Sowing the Seeds for an Ecologically Conscious Society: Foundation for Environmental Education (FEE) by Ashim Shanker and Connie K. Chung
3. ERIC ED497546: Evaluation of Eco-Schools Scotland. SCRE Research Report No. 124 at http://files.eric.ed.gov/fulltext/ED497546.pdf
4. Sibel Ozsoy, Hamide Ertepinar and Necdet Saglam (2012). Can eco-schools improve elementary school students’ environmental literacy levels? in Asia-Pacific Forum on Science Learning and Teaching, Volume 13, Issue 2, Article 3
