= Hotel rating =

System of classifying hotels according to their quality

"Five-star Superior" rating at the Hotel Vier Jahreszeiten Kempinski in Munich, Germany

Hotel ratings are often useful so as to classify hotels according to their quality. From the initial purpose of informing travellers on basic facilities that can be expected, the objectives of hotel rating have expanded into a focus on the hotel experience as a whole. The terms "grading", "rating", and "classification" are used to generally refer to the same concept.

There is a wide variety of rating schemes used by different organizations around the world. Many have a system involving stars, with a greater number of stars indicating greater luxury. In The USA American Automobile Association (AAA) and their affiliated bodies use diamonds instead of stars to express hotel and restaurant rating levels.

Traditional systems focus on what goods and services are available, including food services, entertainment, view, spas and fitness centers. Room size, ease of access, and location may be also be considered, and some standards also incorporate quality of design and service. Some consider assessments that lean heavily on amenities disadvantageous to smaller hotels, whose quality of accommodation could fall into one class but whose lack of an item such as an elevator or a spa prevent it from reaching a higher categorization.

== History ==
Forbes Travel Guide, formerly Mobil Travel Guide, launched its star rating system in 1958. The Swiss hotel rating was the first non-governmental formal hotel classification system, beginning in 1979. It influenced hotel classification in Austria and Germany. The formal hotel classification of the DEHOGA (German Hotel and Restaurant Association) started on 1 August 1996, with 80% of guests citing hotel stars as the main criterion in hotel selection. This implementation influenced the creation of a common European Hotelstars rating system, which started in 2010. In 2024, the Michelin Guide started awarding one, two, and three keys to highly rated hotels.

== Hotel classification by Region ==
=== European Hotelstars Union ===
The HOTREC (Hotels, Restaurants & Cafés in Europe) is an umbrella organization for 39 associations from 24 European countries. At a conference in Bergen in 2004, the partners drafted a hotel classification system in order to harmonize their national standards. In 2007 HOTREC launched the European Hospitality Quality scheme (EHQ) which has since accredited the existing national inspection bodies for hotel rating. Some member countries set standards by law, including Belgium, Denmark, Greece, Italy, Malta, Netherlands, Portugal, Spain, and Hungary. In Germany, Austria, and Switzerland, the rating is defined by the respective hotel industry association. Under the patronage of HOTREC, the hotel associations of Austria, Czech Republic, Germany, Hungary, Netherlands, Sweden, and Switzerland created the Hotelstars Union. On 14 September 2009, the Hotelstars Union classification system was established at a conference in Prague. This system became effective in these countries in January 2010, with the exception of Hungary, Switzerland, and the Netherlands, who have chosen later dates for the change. Since then, more countries have joined the HOTREC hotelstars system, including Estonia (2011), Latvia (2011), Lithuania (2011), Luxembourg (2011), Malta (2012), Belgium (2013), Denmark (2013), Greece (2013), Liechtenstein (2015), Slovenia (2017), Azerbaijan (2020), and Georgia (2021).

For hotels with three to five stars, the Hotelstars Union will use "mystery guests" to check the service quality regularly. The European Hotelstars Union system is based on the earlier German hotelstars system that had widely influenced the hotel classifications in central Europe, with five stars and a Superior mark to flag extras. Instead of a strict minimum in room size and required shower facilities (e.g. a bath tub in a four-star hotel) there is a catalogue of criteria with 7 qualification areas encompassing 247 elements, where some are mandatory for a star and others optional. The main criteria are in quality management, wellness, and sleeping accommodation. In the catalogue of criteria each entry is associated with a number of points – each Hotelstars level requires a minimal sum of points besides some criteria being obligatory for the level. The minimum requirement for the Superior flag requires the same sum of points as for the next Hotelstars level, which was not awarded, owing to at least one obligatory requirement being left out.

Hotelstar		Mandatory criteria
$\bigstar$	Tourist	Reception service; Cashless payment; Extended breakfast; Beverage offer in the hotel; Deposit possibility; 100% of the rooms with shower/WC or bath tub/WC; Daily room cleaning; 100% of the rooms with colour-TV together with remote control; WiFi Internet access both in the rooms and in the public areas; Table and chair; Soap or body wash; Bath towels; Offer of sanitary products (e.g. toothbrush, toothpaste, shaving kit)
$\bigstar \mathbf S$	Superior Tourist	The Superior flag is provided when the additional service and accommodation provisions are not sufficient for the next Hotelstar. The bathroom facilities are usually at the same level as for two stars hotels but built from cheaper materials. The cost for regular inspection by independent associations is waived as well.
$\bigstar\bigstar$	Standard	In addition to the single star (★) hotels: Bilingual staff (e.g. German/English); Breakfast buffet; Reading light next to the bed; Bath essence or shower gel; Bath and hand towels; Linen shelves; Offer of sewing kit and shoe polish utensils
$\bigstar\bigstar \mathbf S$	Superior Standard	The Superior flag is provided when the additional service and accommodation provisions are not sufficient for the next Hotelstar. The Standard-Superior does usually offer the same service level as three-star hotels but the interiors of the hotel are smaller and cheaper so that the three stars were not to be awarded by the inspection body. A two-star superior does not require mystery guesting.
$\bigstar\bigstar\bigstar$	Comfort	In addition to the standard star (★★) hotels: Reception opened 10 hours, accessible by phone or digital communication 24 hours from inside and outside; Three piece lounge suite at the reception, luggage service; Beverage offer in the room; Telephone on demand; Audio or multimedia entertainment system; Heating facility in the bathroom, hair-dryer, cleansing tissue; Dressing mirror, place to put the luggage/suitcase; Sewing kit, shoe polish utensils, laundry and ironing service; Additional pillow and additional blanket on demand; Systematic complaint management system; Bilingual website owned by hotel
$\bigstar\bigstar\bigstar \mathbf S$	Superior Comfort	The Superior flag is provided when the additional service and accommodation provisions are not sufficient for the next Hotelstar. The accommodation facilities for a superior hotel need to be on a modern level and fully renovated which is checked regularly.
$\bigstar\bigstar\bigstar\bigstar$	First Class	In addition to the comfort star (★★★) hotels: Reception opened 16 hours, accessible by phone 24 hours from inside and outside; Lobby with seats and beverage service; Breakfast buffet or breakfast menu card via room service; Minibar, maxibar or 16 hours beverages via room service; Upholstered chair/couch with side table; Bath robe and slippers on demand; Cosmetic products (e.g. shower cap, nail file, cotton swabs), vanity mirror, tray of a large scale in the bathroom; TV has international channels available
$\bigstar\bigstar\bigstar\bigstar \mathbf S$	First Class Superior	The Superior flag is provided when the first class hotel has a proven high quality not only in the rooms. The superior hotels provide for additional facilities in the hotel like a sauna or a workout room. The quality is checked regularly by mystery guesting of an external inspection service.
$\bigstar\bigstar\bigstar\bigstar\bigstar$	Luxury	In addition to the first class (★★★★) hotels: Reception opened 24 hours, multilingual staff; Doorman-service or valet parking; Concierge, page boy; Shuttle service, also called Limousine service.; Luggage service; Personalized greeting for each guest with fresh flowers or a present in the room; Minibar and food and beverage offer via room service during 24 hours; Internet device in the room on request; Safe in the room; Ironing service (return within 1 hour), shoe polish service; Turndown service in the evening
$\bigstar\bigstar\bigstar\bigstar\bigstar \mathbf S$	Superior Luxury	The Luxury star hotels need to attain high expectations of an international guest service. The Superior Luxury star is only awarded with a system of intensive guest care.

=== Australia ===
In Australia, the industry accommodation rating scheme and Star Rating trademarks, known as Star Ratings Australia, are owned by the Australian Tourism Industry Council. A Star Rating represents the quality and condition of guest facilities which is determined by 200 criteria. Star Ratings are awarded to hotels, motels, serviced apartments, self-catering, hosted accommodation and caravan-holiday parks. The scheme uses physical visits, reviews, and mystery guest stays to make their accreditation on the accommodation's ratings. Australia's star ratings have been operating since the 1950s as both an accreditation as well as a booking service. It was first owned by the state based automobile clubs including NRMA, RACV, RACQ, RAC, RAA, and RACT. It was then organized by the Australian Automobile Association Tourism (AAA Tourism) as a peak body. However, the booking service in the motoring clubs was not continued and later the annual accommodation guide book ceased to be printed with the accommodation guide going online. AAA Tourism closed in 2013, but Star Ratings Australia continued as an inspection and star rating service only, as well as an accommodation website.

In 2015 Star Ratings Australia became one of the first independent accommodation classification systems in the world to incorporate consumer opinions. Their website also shows a Travellers' Rating which is presented in parallel to the independent Star Rating and is an aggregate of past guest ratings and reviews from more than 100 websites in 45 different languages. The rating is shown as a 10-point score. Weighting applies to the popularity of the source site and the date of the last guest review. The William Angliss Institute in Melbourne developed an independent benchmarking framework to show if a property has met or exceeded guest expectations. On 28 February 2017, Michael Reed, CEO of Australian Motoring Services, advised clients of the closure of Star Ratings Australia brand and asked to remove star rating and automobile club logos from their accommodation and promotional information by June 2017. It was said that competition from online travel agencies such as TripAdvisor and their customer rating system led to its demise. The brand was then transferred to the Australian Tourism Industry Council. In early 2019, Star Ratings were rebranded under the council's "Quality Tourism" Accreditation Program. Star Ratings in Australia stand for independently reviewed quality standards and are defined as such:

Star rating	Overview of criteria according to Star Ratings Australia
$\bigstar\bigstar\bigstar\bigstar\bigstar$	Properties that typify luxury across all areas of operation. Guests will enjoy an extensive range of facilities and comprehensive or highly personalised services. Properties at this level will display excellent design quality and attention to detail.
$\bigstar\bigstar\bigstar\bigstar$	Properties which achieve a deluxe guest experience. A wide range of facilities and superior design qualities are typically complemented by service standards that reflect the varied and discerning needs of the guest.
$\bigstar\bigstar\bigstar$	Properties that deliver a broad range of amenities that achieve above-average accommodation needs. Good quality service, design and physical attributes are typically fit for purpose to match guest expectations.
$\bigstar\bigstar$	Properties that focus on the needs of price conscious travellers. Services and guest facilities are typically limited to keep room rates affordable and competitive but may be available upon request or fee-based.
$\bigstar$	Properties that offer budget facilities without compromising cleanliness or guest security. Guests may access fee-based services or facilities upon request.
halfstar	Half-star ratings (not used alone) indicate modest improvements in the quality and condition of guest facilities.

=== France ===
In France, the rating is defined by the public tourist board (Atout France) using a four-star system (plus "L" for Luxus), which has changed to a five-star system from 2009 on.

=== India ===
Hotels in India are classified by Hotel and Restaurant Association Classification Committee (HRACC), Ministry of Tourism, India. In India, the classification of hotels is based on two categories such as "Star" and "Heritage".

=== New Zealand ===
In New Zealand, hotels and other tourism services are graded by Qualmark, which is owned by Tourism New Zealand, a government organisation.

=== Philippines ===
In the Philippines, the Department of Tourism has an accreditation system for hotels, apartment hotels and resorts. The current system which uses a "star system" which rates establishments from 1 to 5 stars was adopted in 2012. The rating of the aforementioned facilities are determined through a points system. Hotels, apartment hotels, and resorts are graded according to their service, facility quality and condition, and business practices. The Department of Tourism classifies the criteria used into seven dimensions or "business area" namely: Arrival & Departure, Public Areas, Bedrooms, Food & Beverage, Lounge Area, Kitchen Area, Amenities, and Business Practices, all common to the three categories except Kitchen and Lounge Area which is only applicable to apartment hotels. 1,000 points is the maximum number of points an establishment can attain.

Department of Tourism (DOT) star grading system For hotels, resorts, and apartment hotels
Rating	Corresponding points	Summary
Unranked	0–250	—N/a
$\bigstar$	251–400	Has limited facilities and services. Appeals to "budget minded" tourists.
$\bigstar\bigstar$	401–550	Appeals to tourists looking for more than basic accommodation. Has expanded facilities and "higher level" of comfort.
$\bigstar\bigstar\bigstar$	551–700	Accommodation is deemed "very good". More spacious public areas and higher quality facilities and a greater variety of services.
$\bigstar\bigstar\bigstar\bigstar$	701–850	"Up-scale in all areas" and accommodation is "refined and stylish". Service is deemed responsive, and has an extensive array of facilities.
$\bigstar\bigstar\bigstar\bigstar\bigstar$	851–1000	Reflects characteristics of "luxury and sophistication". Facilities are deemed "world class in every manner" and services are deemed meticulous and "exceeding all guests' expectations".

=== South Africa ===
In South Africa, the Tourist Grading Council of South Africa has strict rules for a hotel types granting up to 5 stars.

=== United Kingdom ===
In the United Kingdom hotels are rated from one star to five stars. The RAC pulled out of accommodation grading in 2008 so the only grading schemes in operation are those operated by the AA (Automobile Association) and the national tourist boards: Visit England, Visit Wales, the Scottish Tourist Board and the Northern Ireland Tourist Board. The schemes were all "harmonised" to ensure consistency between the schemes. This applies to all accommodation types apart from self-catering that the AA started offering in 2009. The AA criteria are available on its website. In addition to the usual black stars (ranging from one (the lowest) to five (the highest), the AA awards red stars to the highest-rated, which are deemed "Inspectors' Choice". Each of the national tourist boards have grading explanations on their web sites.

=== United States ===
There is no government-regulated hotel rating standard in the United States. Forbes Travel Guide rates properties with five or four stars, or as "recommended", which is similar to three stars. Lower-quality establishments are omitted. Its predecessor, Mobil Travel Guides used a one-to-five-star system. Forbes says it uses independent inspectors to rate properties on over 900 attributes covering amenities, "cleanliness, efficiency, staff knowledge, gracious service, sense of luxury, guest comfort", and "wellness and sustainability". The details are confidential, but have been leaked. The system requires hotels to meet 90% of standards to be awarded five stars, 82% for four stars, and 72% for recommended, with lower thresholds for maintaining stars and a one-year warning period.

The AAA uses a one-to-five diamond scale. It has 27 criteria covering bedrooms, bathrooms, booking, checkin and checkout, and room service. It also assigns property types and subtypes, such as cottage, motel, large-scale hotel, and casino; and rates accessibility for people who have impaired hearing, vision, dexterity, or mobility. Hotels.com assigns its own ratings based on a one-to-five-star scale, allowing half-stars. The site aggregates customer ratings on a ten-point scale. Google Maps shows two ratings on a one-to-five-star scale: a rating based solely on aggregation of star ratings from customers reflecting how much they liked the establishment, and a hotel class based on amenities. The hotel class is based on a composite of data from "third-party partners, direct research, feedback from hoteliers, and machine learning inference that examines and evaluates hotel attributes, such as price, location, room size, and amenities".

== Global Hotel Ratings ==
Eugene Fodors started creating a new elaborate contextual hotel rating system, that had major influence over future Hotel Rating systems.

=== Forbes Travel Guide ===
Formerly Mobil Travel Guide the global authority that sets the independent luxury standards for hotels, restaurants, spas, and ocean cruise ships. Forbes Global Ratings doesn't rate most hotels.

=== Hotels Digest ===
Focuses on the Top 1000 hotels, assigning the most comprehensive Rating System for the Top rated hotels, but it doesn't assign a rating to other hotels.

=== Leading Hotels of the World ===
Some luxury hotels have use the membership in The Leading Hotels of the World to document regular inspection on an additional level.

=== Michellin Keys ===
In January 2025 Michelin awarded Michellin keys to over 200 distinguished hotels. The Key awards expanded and by October 2026 Michellin awarded 155 Three-Key hotels, 657 Two-Key hotels, and 2,020 One-Key hotels. Unlike Forbes Travel Guide and Hotels Digest, Michellin Keys don't have a checklist, the rating is awarded by reputable Hotel Experts.

=== Trip.com ===
Trip.com distinguished its digital rating system by adding a multi layered digital rating system. It covers cities, nations, regions, continents, and Global ratings. It also has alternative digital lists focusing on Luxury, Scenic, Cultural, Historic, Family Friendly and Gourmet.

== Alternative hotel ratings ==
In recent years, alternative hotel ratings are starting to appear in an effort to promote sustainability or cultural diversity in international tourism.

=== Seven stars ===
Some hotels have been advertised as seven-star hotels. The Burj Al Arab hotel in Dubai, opened in 1998 with a butler for every room, was the first hotel widely described as a "seven-star" property. The hotel says the label originates from an unnamed British journalist on a press visit and that they neither encourage the term's use nor do they use it in their advertising. Similarly, the Emirates Palace Hotel in Abu Dhabi (open since 2005) is sometimes described as seven star, but the hotel uses only a five-star rating. The Galleria in Milan, Italy, was opened in 2007 and claims to have a seven-star certificate from SGS Italy2008.ì; however, the SGS Italy (not the official tourism agency) only has five stars in the general hotel stars categorization, with the full title of the certificate being left unknown, just as the renewal process is unknown. Overall, such claims are predominantly used for advertising purposes, as no traditional organization or formal body awards or recognizes any rating over five-star deluxe.

=== Green Key International ===
Green Key International is a voluntary eco-classification awarded to around 2,900 hotels and other establishments in 57 countries by the Foundation for Environmental Education.

=== Green Key Global ===
Green Key Global is a voluntary eco-classification awarded to around 1,850 hotels and venues in 15 countries. In 2009, Fairmont Hotels & Resorts joined the Green Key Global program.

=== Green Globe ===
Green Globe is a certification for sustainable tourism. Membership is reserved for companies and organizations who are committed to making positive contributions to the planet. The Green Building Initiative (GBI) acquired the U.S. rights to the Canadian Green Globes building assessment and certification for the program in 2004 and adapted it for the U.S. market.

=== Salam Standard ===
Salam Standard is a classification system for Muslim-friendly hotels. Hotels can get certified based on certain Muslim-friendly criteria such as offering prayer mats, removing alcohol from the room and offering halal restaurant recommendations; it is divided into 4 tiers (bronze, silver, gold, and platinum). Archipelago Hotels, Indonesia's biggest hospitality firm, is a prominent member of the Salam Standard system.

=== Guest reviews ===
The advancement of technology and internet connectivity has caused shifts in the way hotel guests book their accommodations. In the past, official hotel ratings were the primary factor in booking a hotel, but now, modern consumers also rely on the opinions of previous guests as expressed in online reviews. These reviews, based on personal experiences, have become increasingly important for other travellers when considering where to stay. In the words of data journalist Thomas Hinton, "In today's world, consumers rely heavily on online information when making purchasing decisions, be it for a new smartphone or the next holiday resort. When shopping for an online accommodation product, more than half of European consumers said that they are influenced by online customer reviews and online ratings, while just one-fifth of consumers see themselves as insusceptible to such reviews and ratings. Two in five European consumers also regard star ratings as an influencing factor when booking hotel rooms, whereas for about one in three consumers, star ratings don't play a role."

== See also ==
- AAA Five Diamond Award
- Star (classification)
