= Vdara =

Resort in Las Vegas, Nevada

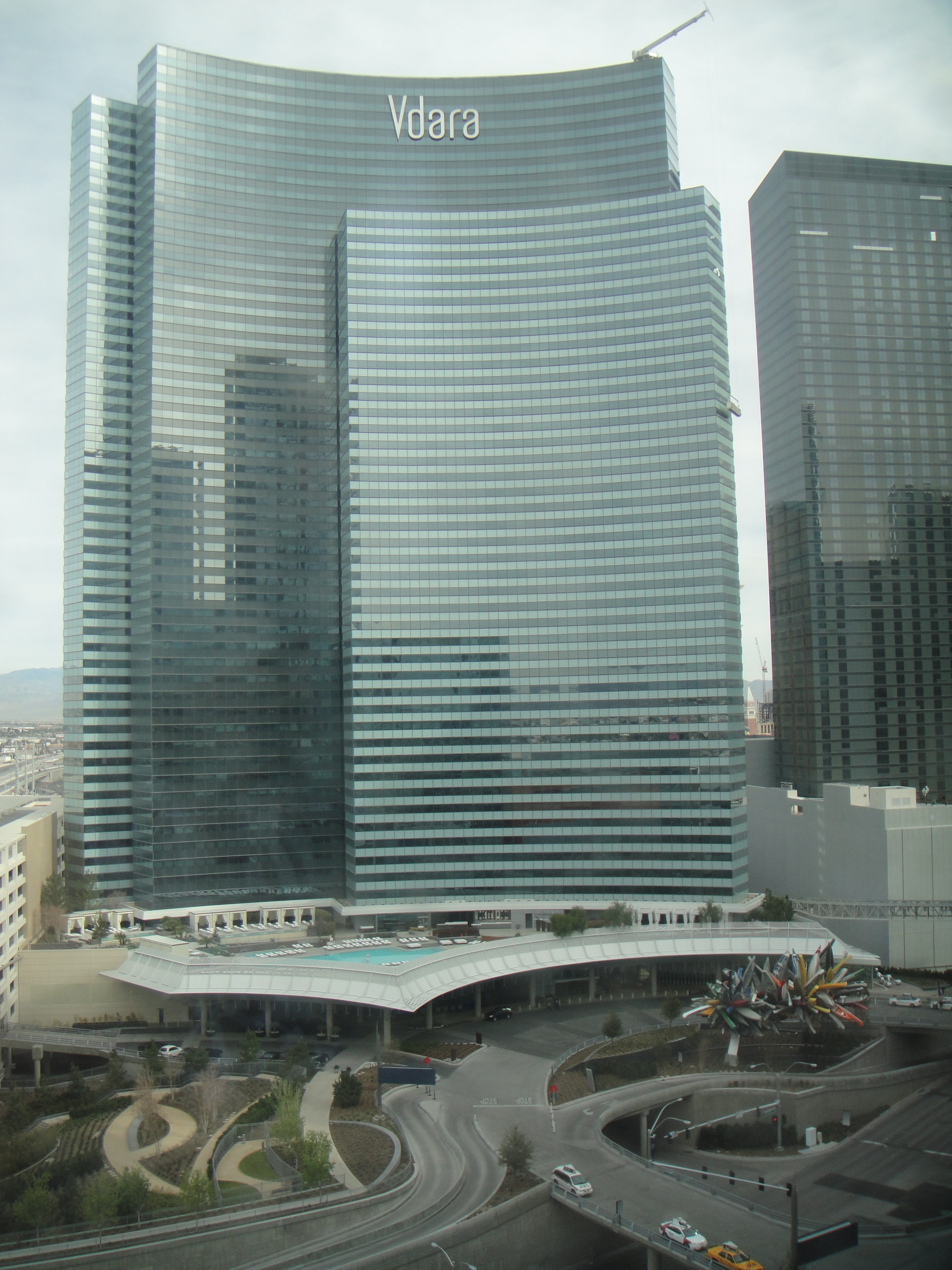
- Vdara as seen from the Aria

General information
- Status: Operating
- Type: Condo hotel
- Location: Paradise, Nevada, U.S., 2600 West Harmon Avenue
- Coordinates: 36°6′34″N 115°10′41″W
- Topped-out: May 14, 2008
- Opening: December 2, 2009
- Owner: The Blackstone Group
- Operator: MGM Resorts International

Technical details
- Floor count: 57

Design and construction
- Architect: Rafael Viñoly
- Developer: MGM Resorts International

Other information
- Number of suites: 1,495
- Number of restaurants: 1 (Market Cafe Vdara)

Website
- www.vdara.com

Vdara (/vəˈdɑːrə/ və-DAR-ə) is a condo-hotel within the CityCenter complex, located on the Las Vegas Strip in Paradise, Nevada. It was designed by Rafael Viñoly, and is located across from CityCenter's Aria Resort & Casino. Vdara opened on December 2, 2009 as a joint venture between MGM Resorts International and Dubai World. In 2021, MGM bought out Dubai World and sold Vdara to The Blackstone Group, while remaining as operator.

Vdara's 57-story tower houses 1,495 suites. The non-gaming property also includes a two-floor spa, meeting space, a pool deck, a market cafe, and a bar. A design flaw was discovered in 2008, when it was learned that the hotel's reflective surface and concave design can act as a parabolic reflector that creates conditions of extremely high temperature at the pool deck.

== History ==
Vdara was announced in October 2006, as part of the CityCenter project by MGM. It was designed by Rafael Viñoly. The name "Vdara" is made up. It was coined by Rafael Viñoly Architects, taking its "V" from "Vegas" and "ara" from boutique hotels in California such as Park Hyatt Resort Aviara and Ritz-Carlton Bacara. On May 14, 2008, Vdara became the first of the CityCenter towers to be topped off. Vdara opened to invited guests and media on December 1, 2009. The public opening occurred the following day, making it the first component of CityCenter to open.

For its environmentally friendly design, Vdara was designated as a LEED Gold building prior to its opening, and received a five-key rating from Green Key Global in 2010.

In 2021, MGM bought out its CityCenter partner, Dubai World, gaining full ownership of the Vdara hotel and Aria. That same year, MGM sold both properties for $3.89 billion in cash to The Blackstone Group, which leased them back to MGM for an annual rent of $215 million.

== Features ==
Vdara is a non-gaming and non-smoking hotel. The crescent-shaped 57-story tower includes 1,495 suites, ranging in size from 582 to 1,447 sq ft (54.1 to 134.4 m^{2}).

The property originated as a condo hotel, giving owners the option to participate in a rental program to lease their condos as hotel rooms when they are not residing there. However, due to poor economic conditions brought on by the Great Recession, MGM converted 1,350 units into regular hotel rooms, leaving approximately 150 as residential units. Condo closings began in March 2010.

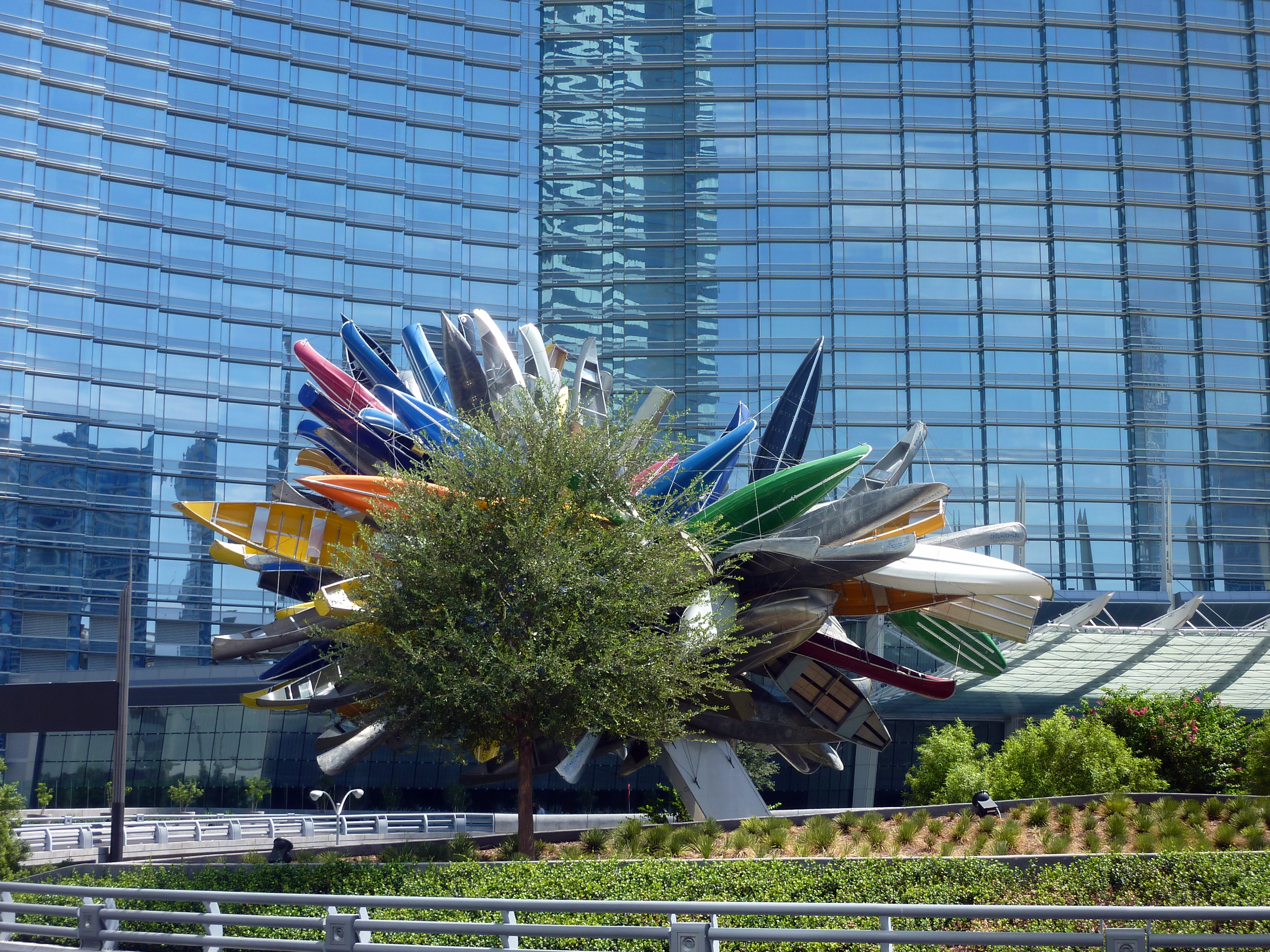
Big Edge sculpture outside the hotel entrance

Artwork is incorporated into Vdara's interior and exterior design. Nancy Rubin's 57 by 75 ft (17 by 23 m) sculpture Big Edge, made of various boats, is displayed outside the entrance of the hotel. It features approximately 200 canoes, catamarans, kayaks, paddle boats, rowboats, and surfboards held together with stainless steel wire cable. The sculpture is meant to resemble a blooming flower. A large painting by Frank Stella hangs above the registration desk in the lobby.

Vdara includes an 18,000 sq ft (1,700 m^{2}) two-story spa and salon, and a 40,000 sq ft (3,700 m^{2}) pool area. Abbey Beach, a dayclub pool event targeted at a gay clientele, operated during 2010. An interior walkway connects Vdara with the adjacent Bellagio and Cosmopolitan resorts.

Vdara opened with 10,000 sq ft (930 m^{2}) of meeting space, and one full-service restaurant, Silk Road, which served Mediterranean food. It was designed by Karim Rashid. Market Cafe Vdara, a small grocery store also serving sandwiches and pastries, opened in March 2011. Silk Road closed simultaneously, due to lack of demand. In 2013, part of the former restaurant was converted into meeting and event space, with a Starbucks taking up the remainder. Two years later, Vdara opened a bar, Vice Versa, in its lobby. It serves food, and includes indoor and outdoor seating which overlooks CityCenter.

In 2017, Vdara debuted autonomous robots capable of delivering certain room-service items.

== Solar glare ==
In 2010, it was established that the tower's south side, with its reflective surface and concave design, can act as a collecting mirror. The reflected rays of the sun create dangerous conditions of extremely high temperature at the pool deck. Hotel employees and news outlets referred to the phenomenon as the "death ray", while management preferred the term "solar convergence".

MGM and contractors became aware of the problem in 2008. Vdara management considered various solutions but the challenge in overcoming the structural design problem is that the sun and its reflection are targets that constantly move during the day and as every season progresses. Management installed large blue umbrellas over the pool deck to protect bathers, while the hotel's glass exterior has been covered with non-reflective film.

Viñoly also designed the "Walkie-Talkie" skyscraper in London, opened in 2014, which has been dubbed the "Walkie-Scorchie" and "Fryscraper" due to a similar, sun-reflecting and scorching problem.

== Gallery ==
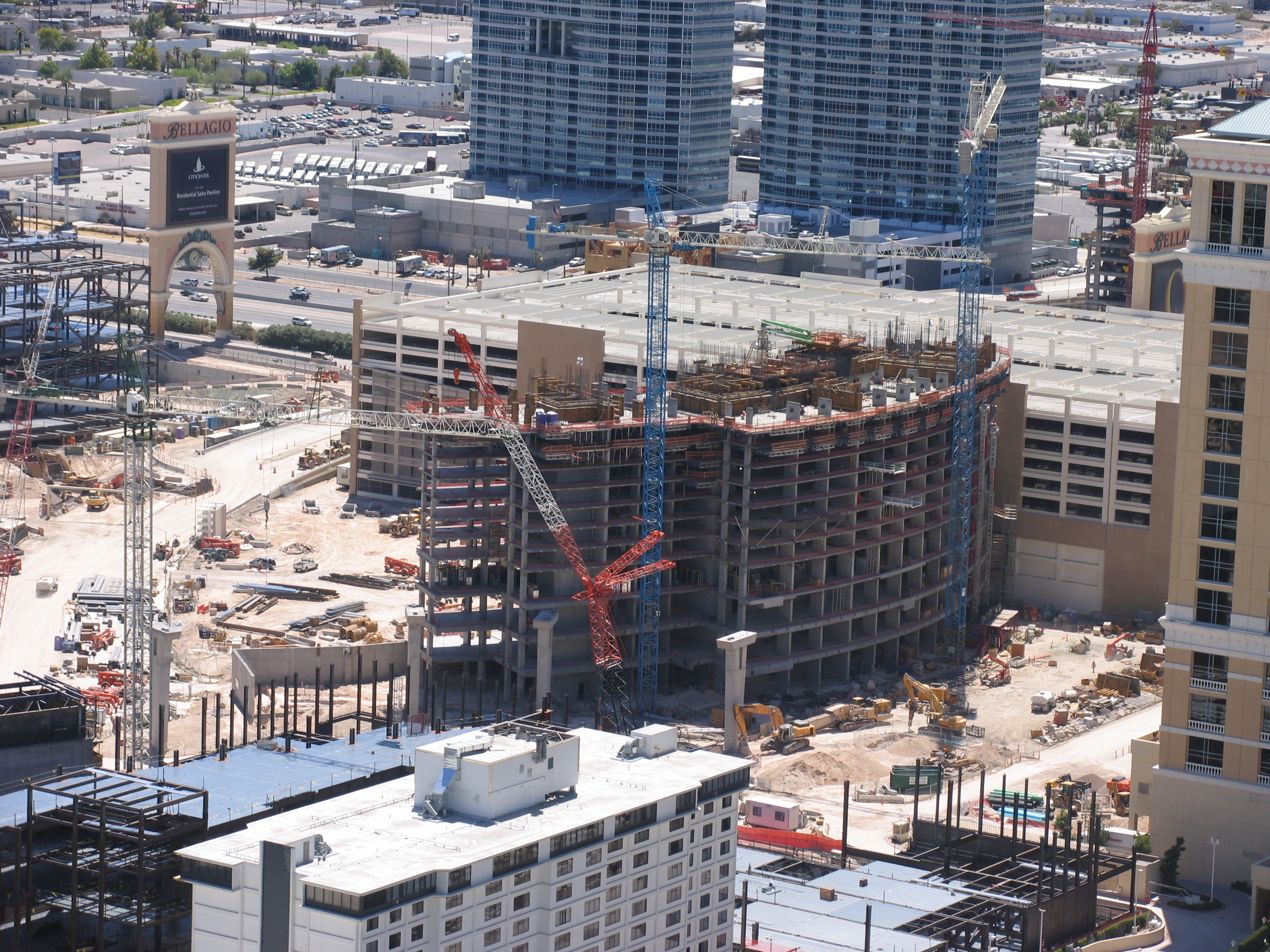
Construction in mid-2007

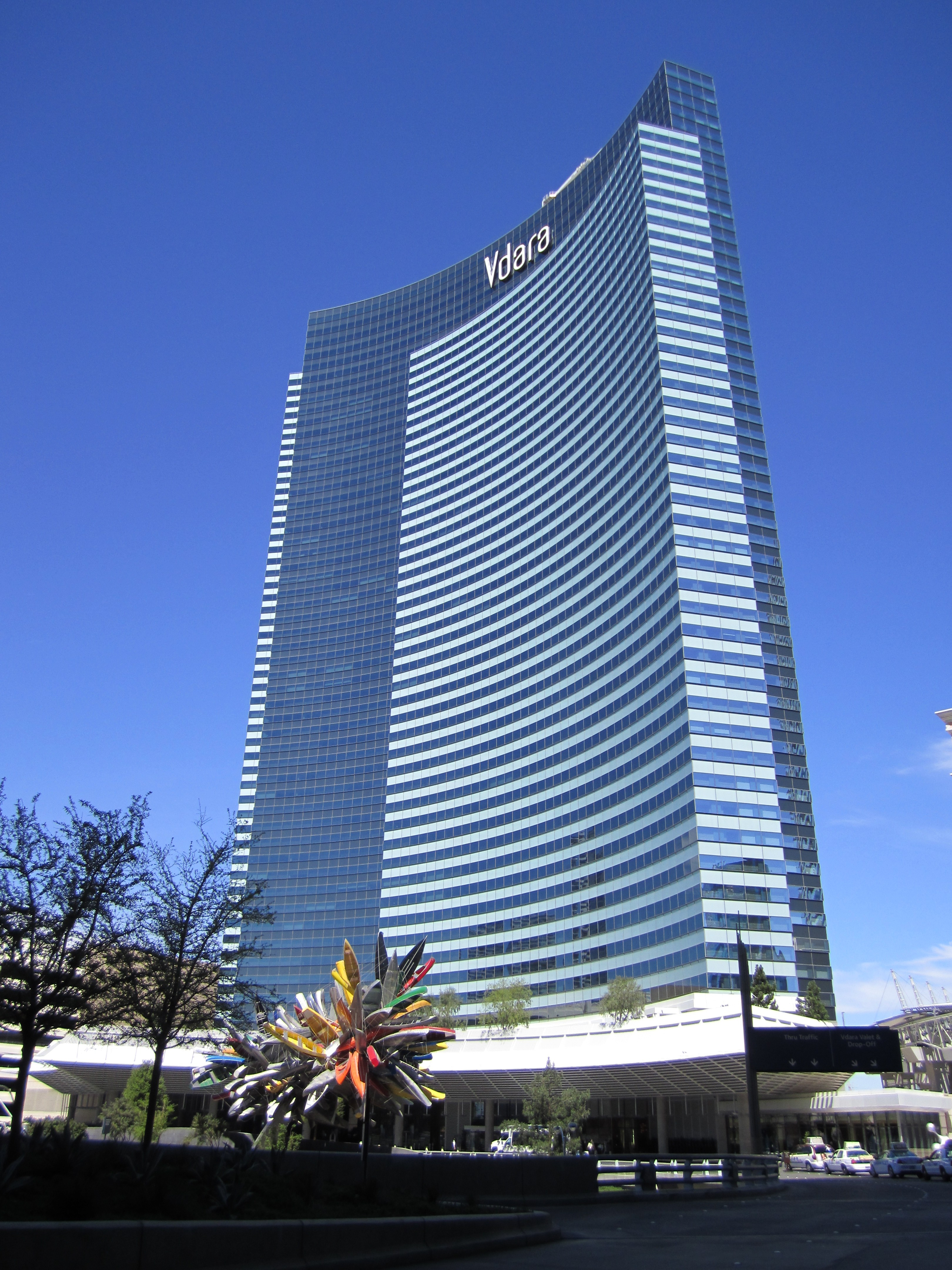
Outside Vdara's entrance

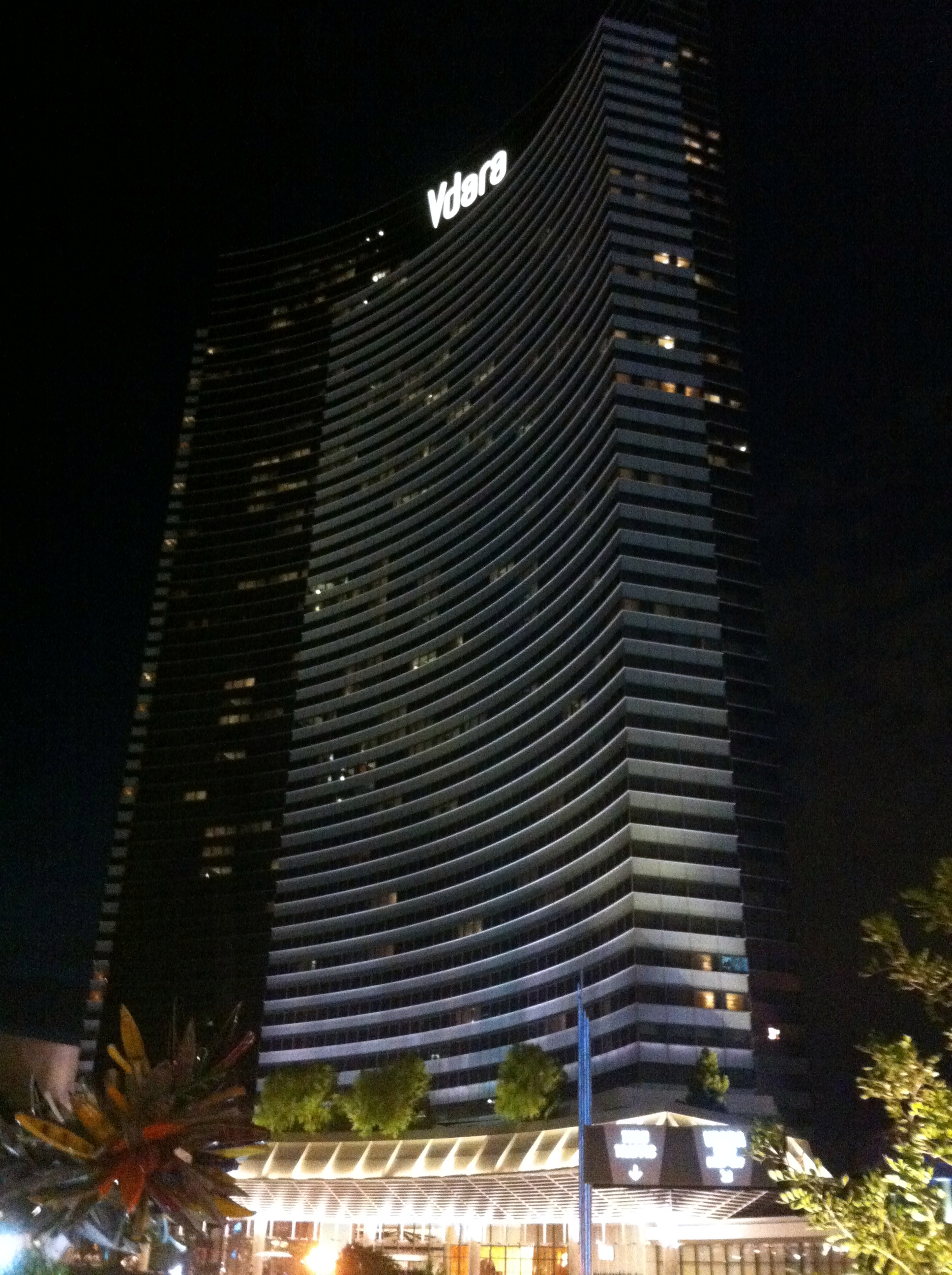
Vdara at night

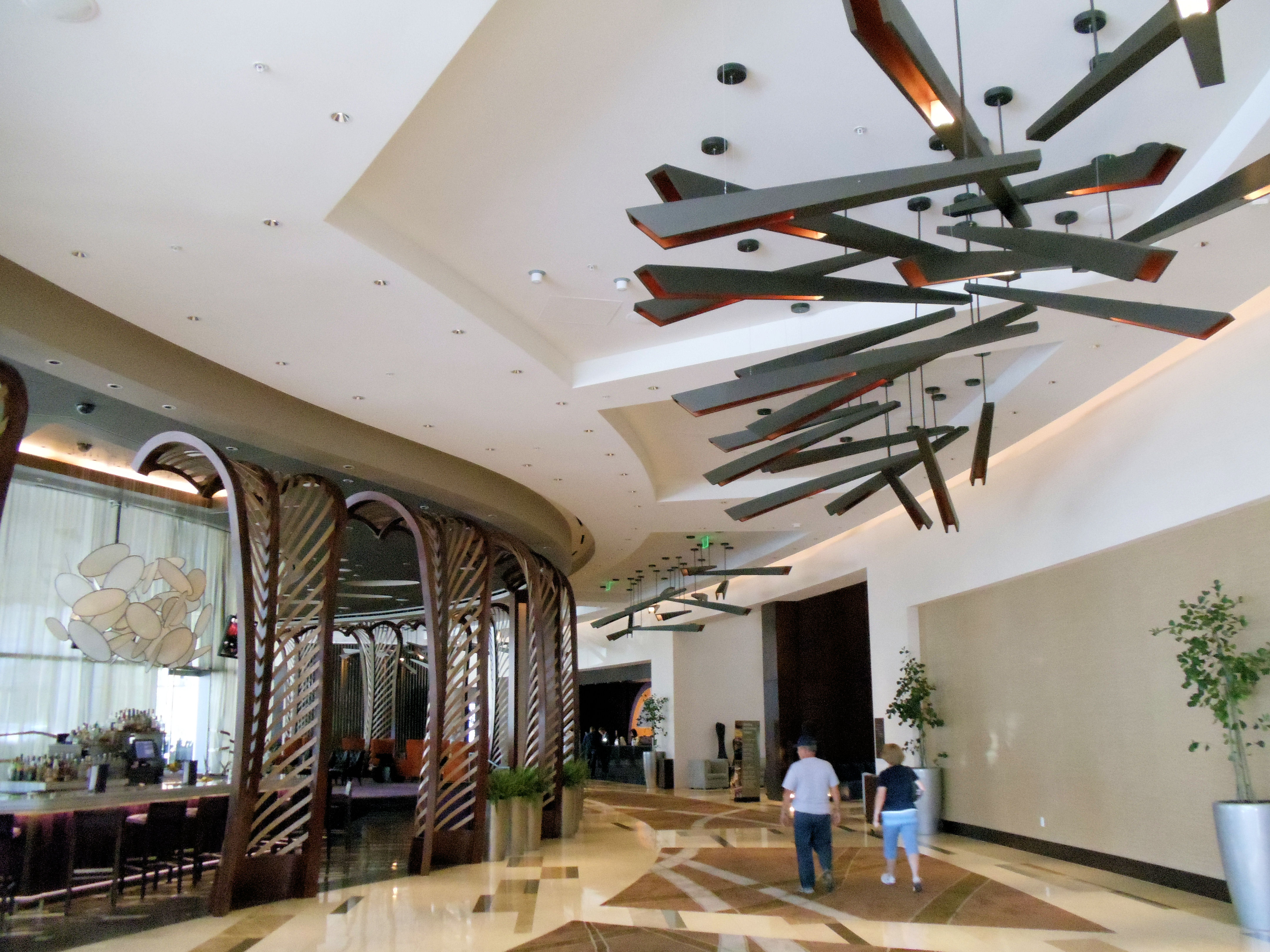
Lobby and bar area, 2010

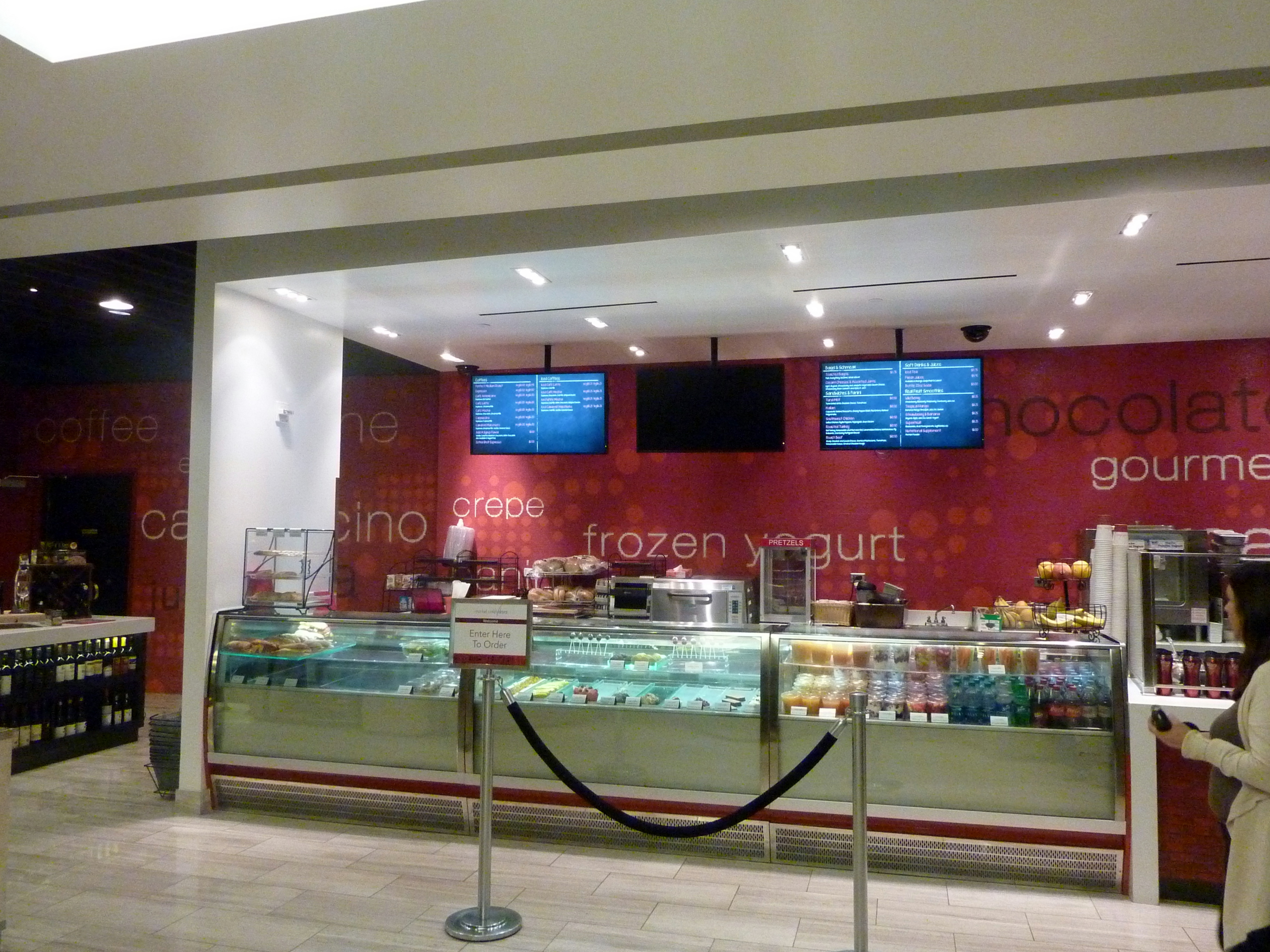
Market Cafe Vdara

== See also ==
- List of tallest buildings in Las Vegas
