= Green Key =

Green Key may refer to:

- Green Key International, an eco-label based in Denmark
- Green Key Global, an industry-led eco-label based in Canada
- Green Key Books, a company who acquired the publishing rights to God's Word Translation
- Green Key Society, a student group at Dartmouth College, Hanover, New Hampshire, US
  - Green Key Weekend, a Dartmouth College tradition
- Green Key Technologies, a major telephony key system used in financial trading turrets

== See also ==
- Green Cay National Wildlife Refuge, near Saint Croix, U.S. Virgin Islands
