= YRE =

YRE may refer to:

- Young Reporters for the Environment
- Youth against Racism in Europe
- Radio Broadcasting Service (Yperesia Radiofonikes Ekpompes, Υπηρεσία Ραδιοφωνικής Εκπομπής), a predecessor of the Hellenic Broadcasting Corporation
