= Noray Marina of Melilla =

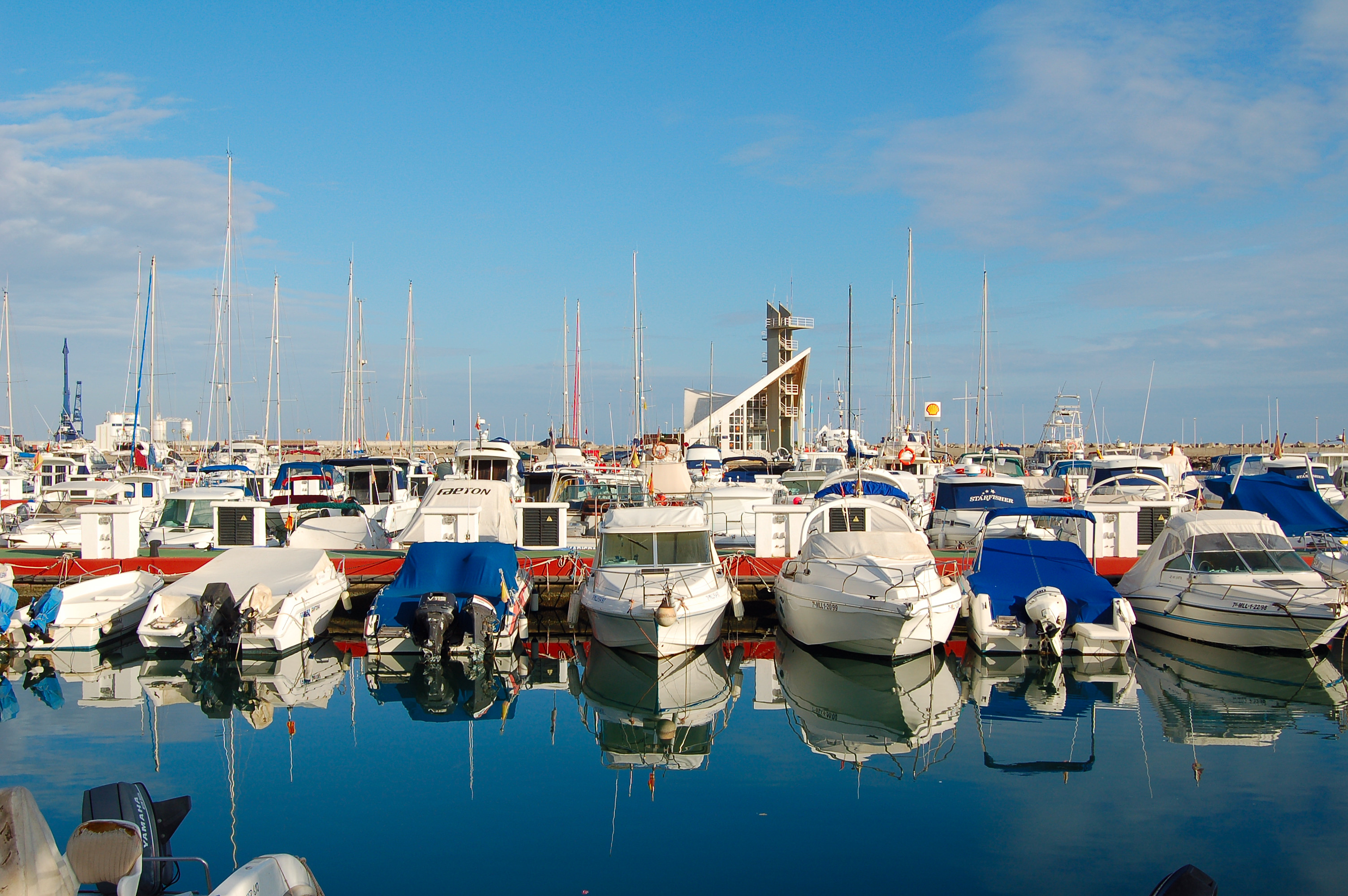
- Interactive map of Noray Marina of Melilla
- Location within Spain

Location
- Country: Spain
- Location: Melilla
- Coordinates: 35.291791°N 2.932527°W
- UN/LOCODE: ESMLN

Details
- Operated by: Port Authority of Melilla

Noray Marina is located in the city of Melilla, (Spain). It belongs to the Port Authority of Melilla. It has managed to hoist the Blue Flag awarded by the European Foundation for Environmental Education.

It is located in the city centre. It was inaugurated at the beginning of 1997. It is located south of the facilities of the Port of Melilla, with a total area of 36,700 m2, with capacity for 397 sports and recreational vessels, with lengths between 6 and 24 metres.

== History ==
Marina Noray was inaugurated at the beginning of 1997. Its construction was prompted by the celebration, in 1997, of the 5th Centenary of Melilla as a Spanish city.
