= Hipodromo Beach =

Beach in Melilla, Spain

- Beach
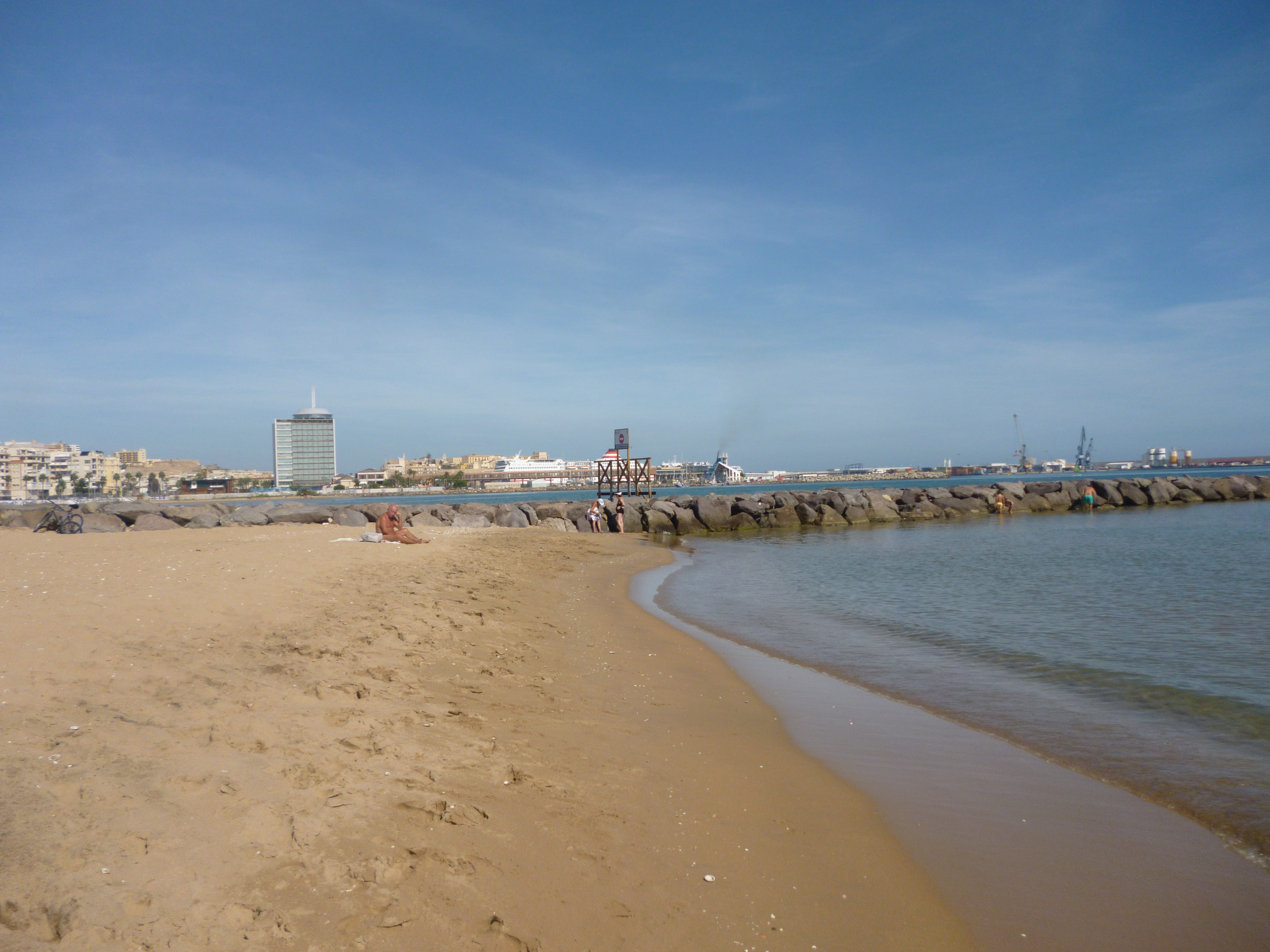
- Interactive map of Hipodromo Beach
- Coordinates: 35°16′41″N 2°56′07″W
- Location: Melilla, Spain

Hipodromo Beach (Spanish: Playa del Hipódromo) is located in Melilla, Spain. It has "Blue Flag" status, which confirms the good water quality.
