= Horcas Coloradas Beach =

Beach in Melilla, Spain

- Beach
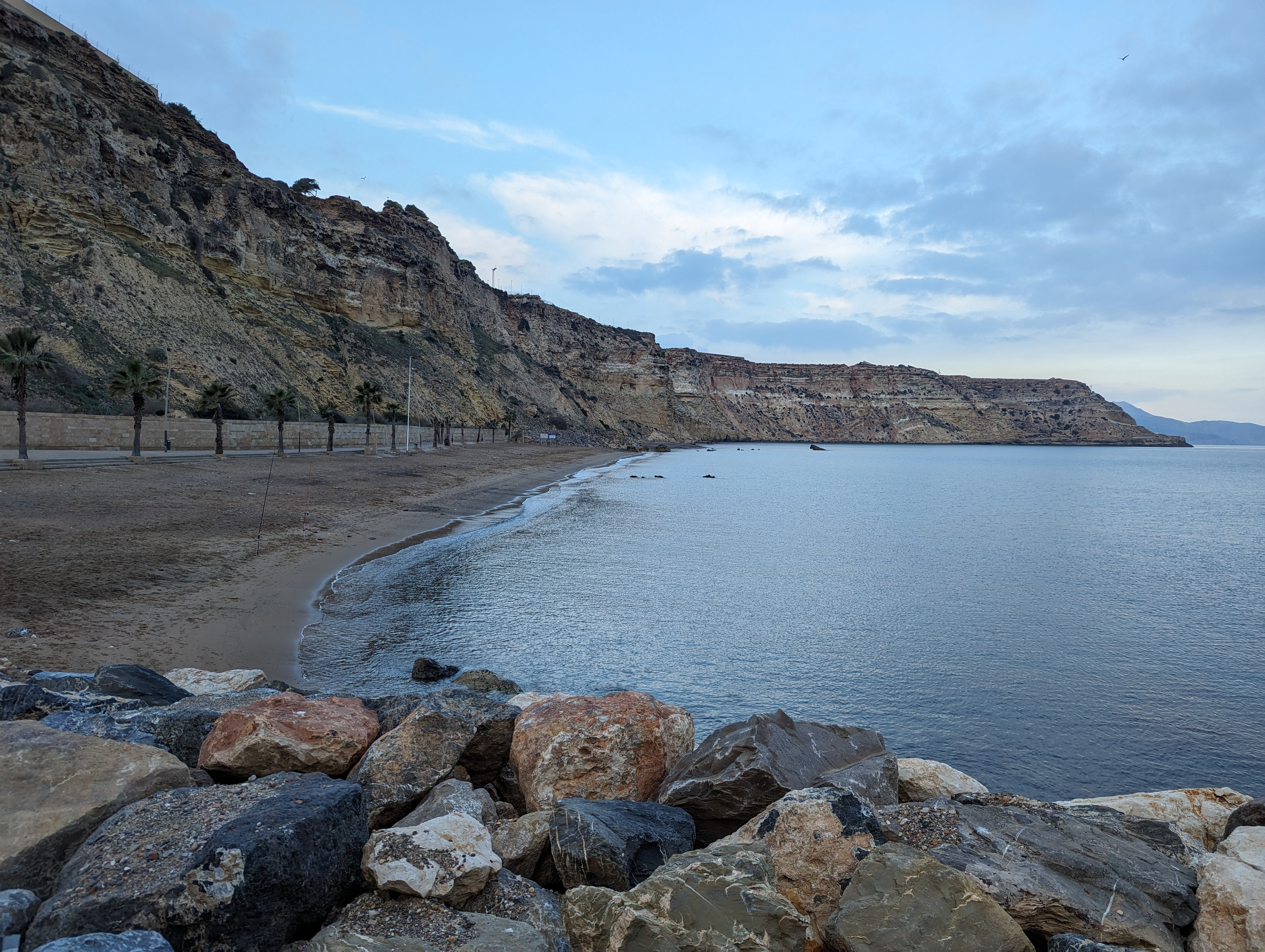
- Interactive map of Horcas Coloradas Beach
- Coordinates: 35.305°N 2.944°W
- Location: Melilla, Spain

Horcas Coloradas Beach (Spanish: Playa de Horcas Coloradas) is located in Melilla, Spain.It has "Blue Flag" status, which confirms the good water quality.
