= Learning about Forests =

Learning about Forests (LEAF) is one of the five programs run by the Foundation for Environmental Education (FEE), a non-governmental organization located in Copenhagen, Denmark. LEAF aims to encourage school classes and teachers to use forests for educational activities. The vision is to see an increased level of awareness and knowledge the key role the forest plays on our planet. The program's mission is to spread environmental education concerning forests and all their values among school children all around the world.

== Member organizations ==
In August 2013, LEAF was composed of twenty-one organizations:

| Organization | Country |
|---|---|
| Flanders Bond Beter Leefmilieu | Belgium |
| Bulgarian Blue Flag Movement | Bulgaria |
| Cyprus Marine Environment Protection Association (CYMEPA) | Cyprus |
| Tereza Association | Czech Republic |
| Center for Environmental Education and Communications | China |
| Skoven i skolen | Denmark |
| Finnish Forest Association | Finland |
| Hellenic Society for the Protection of Nature (HSPN) | Greece |
| "World's Green Star" Organization (Setar-e Sabz-e Jahan) | Iran |
| An Taisce Education | Ireland |
| FEE Japan | Japan |
| Kenya Organization for Environmental Education (KOEE) | Kenya |
| Latvia's State Forests | Latvia |
| Nature Trust Malta | Malta |
| FEE-N | Netherlands |
| Forestry Extension Institute - Skoleskogen | Norway |
| Centrul Carpato-Danubian de Geoecologie (CCDG Romania) | Romania |
| Keep St. Petersburg Tidy (KSPT) | Russia |
| Skogen i skolan | Sweden |
| Turkiye Cevre Egitim Vakfi (TURCEV) | Turkey |
| Conservation Efforts for Community Development (CECOD) | Uganda |
