= San Lorenzo Beach =

Beach in Melilla, Spain

- Beach
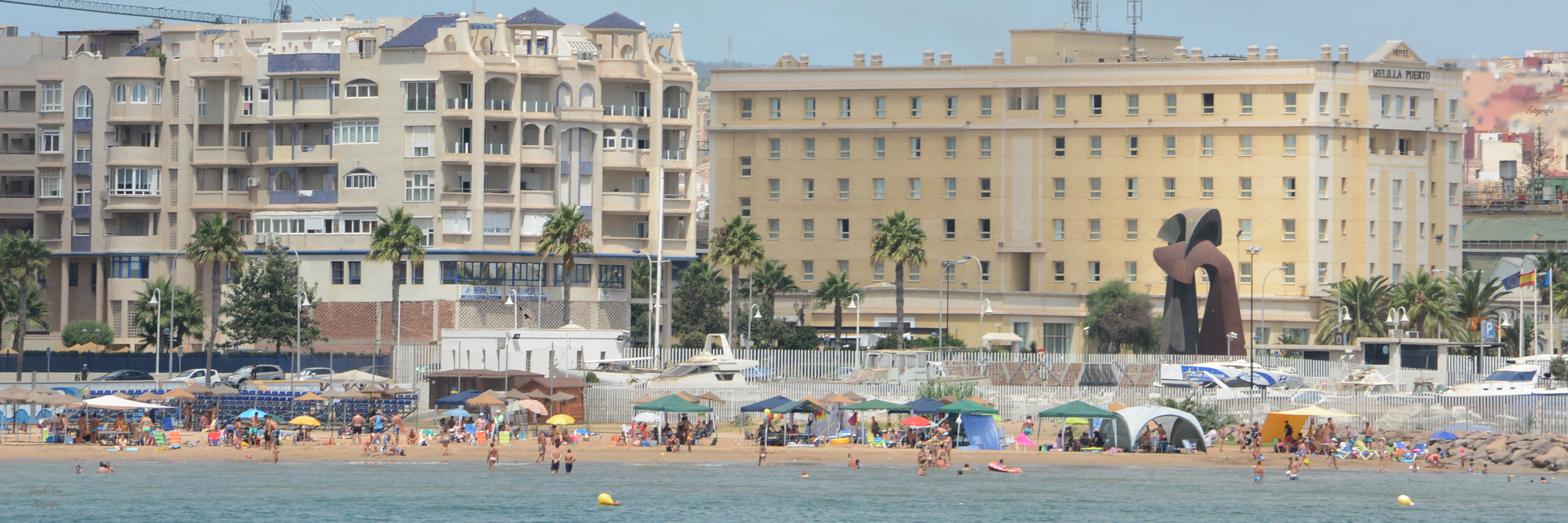
- Interactive map of San Lorenzo Beach
- Coordinates: 35.287°N 2.937°W
- Location: Melilla, Spain

San Lorenzo Beach (Spanish: Playa de San Lorenzo) is located in Melilla, Spain. It has "Blue Flag" status, which confirms the good water quality.
