= Hipica Beach =

Beach in Melilla, Spain

- Beach
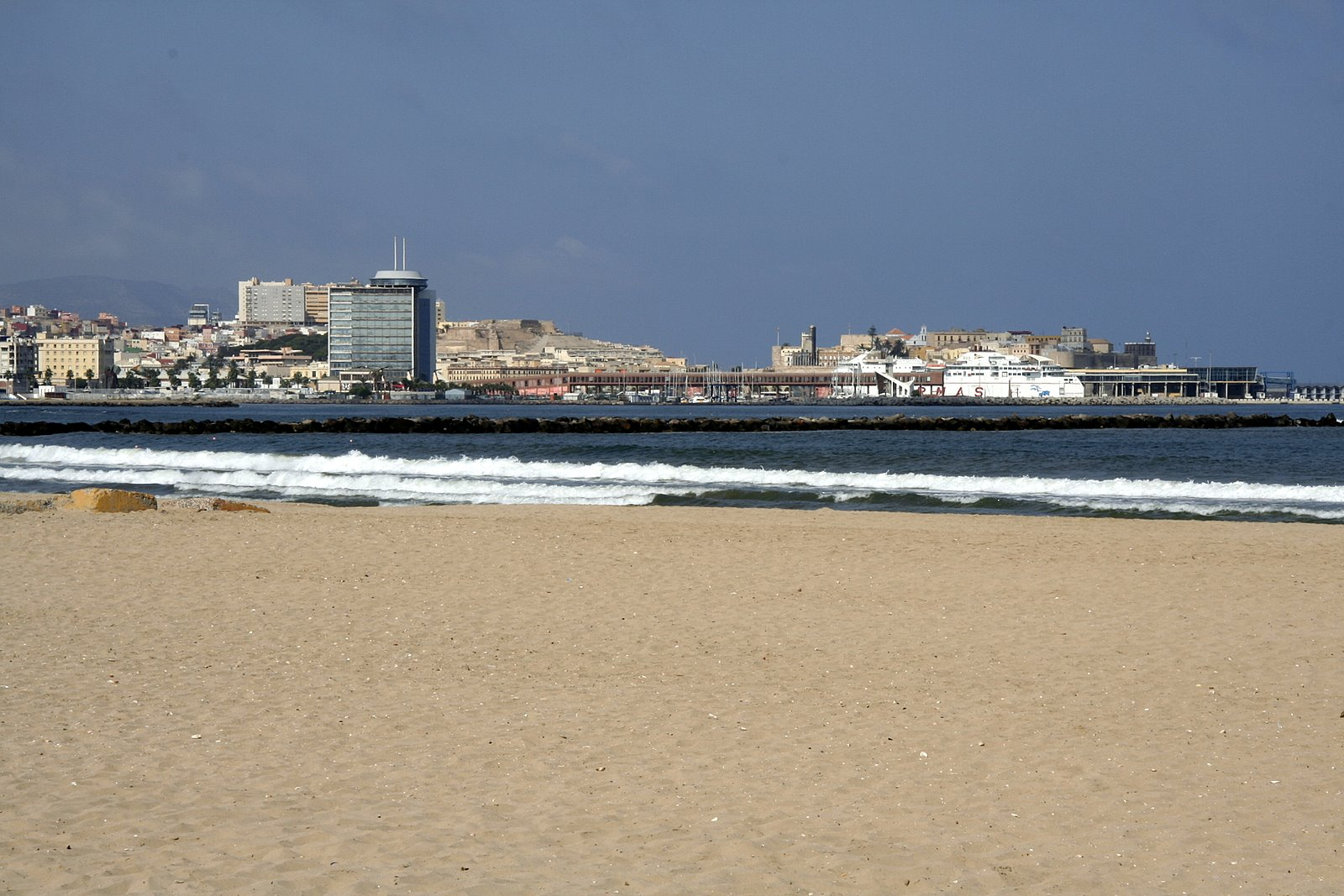
- Interactive map of Hipica Beach
- Coordinates: 35.275°N 2.932°W
- Location: Melilla, Spain

Hipica Beach (Spanish: Playa de la Hípica) is located in Melilla, Spain. It has "Blue Flag" status, which confirms the good water quality.
