= Carabos Beach =

Beach in Melilla, Spain

- Beach
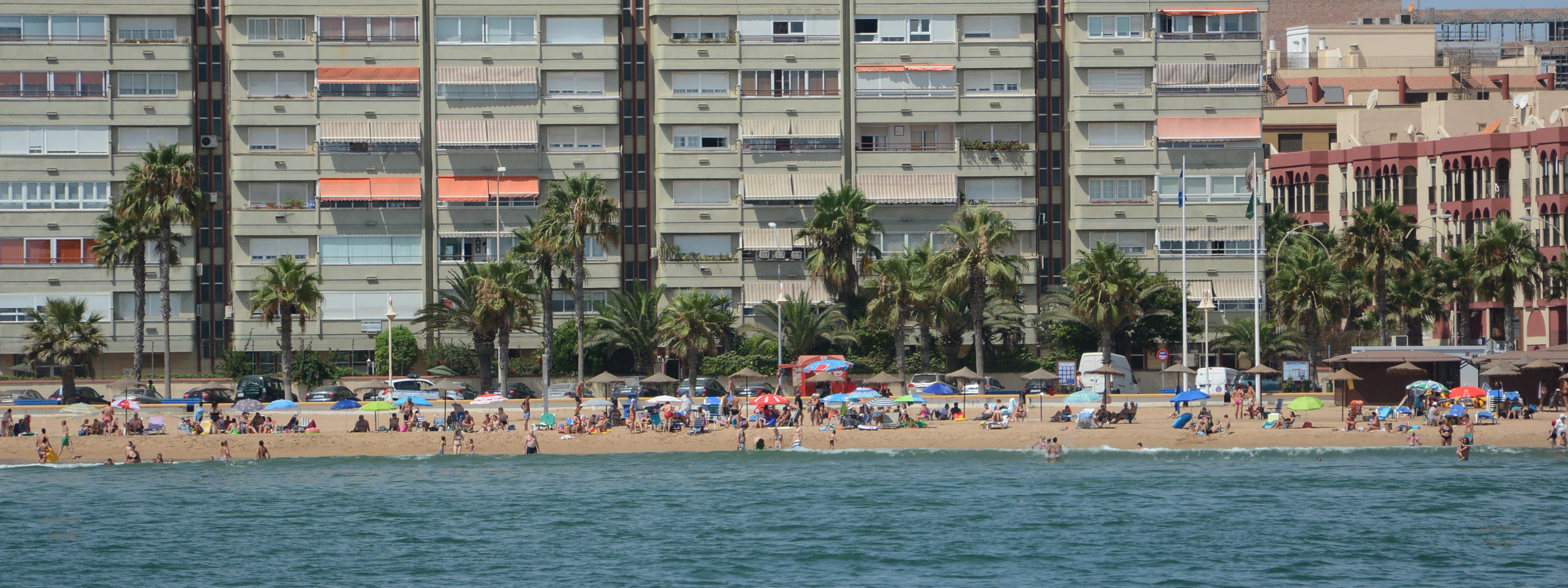
- Interactive map of Carabos Beach
- Coordinates: 35.284°N 2.938°W
- Location: Melilla, Spain

Carabos Beach (Spanish: Playa de los Cárabos) is located in Melilla, Spain. It has "Blue Flag" status, which confirms the good water quality.
