= Blue Flag award =

Certification for high quality beaches

Blue Flag Logo

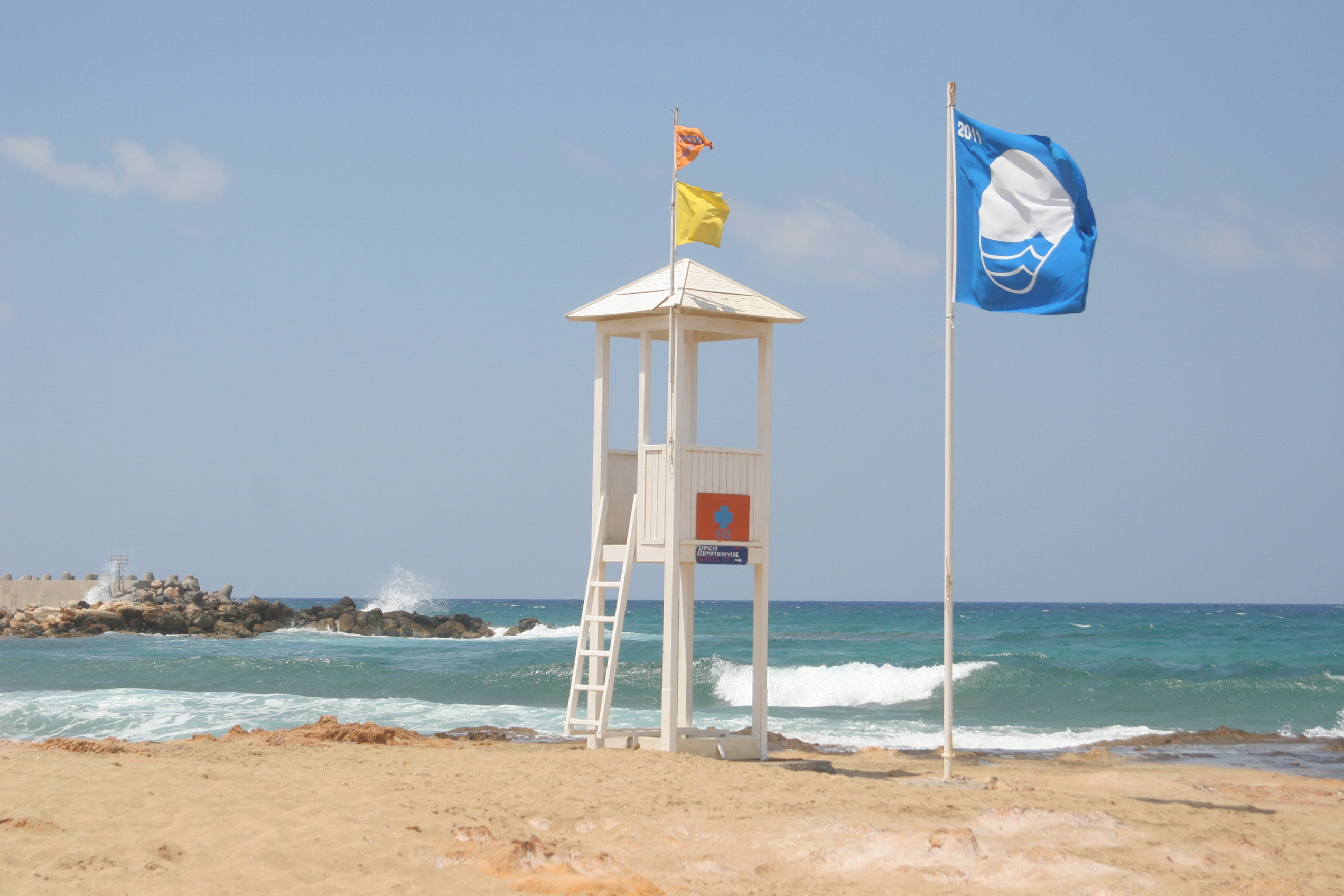
Blue Flag in Malia, Crete

The Blue Flag is a certification by the Foundation for Environmental Education (FEE) that a beach, marina, or sustainable boating tourism operator meets its standards. The Blue Flag is a trademark owned by FEE, which is a not-for-profit, non-governmental organisation consisting of more than 100 organisations spreading 81 countries. As of 2025, Spain is the country with the most Blue Flag beaches in the world, with 642 Blue Flags and 749 awards in total.

FEE's Blue Flag criteria include standards for quality, safety, environmental education and information, the provision of services, and general environmental management. The Blue Flag is hence sought as an indication of high environmental and quality standards.

Certificates, which FEE refers to as awards, are issued on an annual basis to beaches and marinas of FEE member countries by the Blue Flag international jury. For a beach to be awarded, it must meet at least thirty of the Blue Flag's criteria spanning four categories. Meanwhile, for a marina to be awarded, it must meet at least thirty-eight criteria spanning six categories. The awards are announced yearly on 5 June for Europe, Canada, Morocco, Tunisia, and other countries in a similar geographic location, and on 1 November for the Caribbean, New Zealand, South Africa, and other countries in the Southern Hemisphere.

In the European Union, the water quality standards are incorporated in the EC Water Framework Directive.

== Blue Flags awarded ==
=== 2024 awards ===
As a result of the 2024 award cycle, a total of 5,010 Blue Flags are waving around the world. Spain was the most awarded country, with a total of 747 Blue Flags.

=== Table of Blue Flags in force 2024 ===
The table below lists the total number of Blue Flags (including beaches, marinas, and boats) in each country as a result of the 2024 awards cycle (with a few countries listed containing only information from the 2015 awards cycle).

Country	Blue Flag Beaches	Blue Flag Marinas	Blue Flag Boats	Total Blue Flags
Albania	2	0	0	2
Argentina	10	0	0	10
Bahamas (2015)	0	3	0	3
Belgium	12	1	0	13
Brazil	37	11	0	48
Bulgaria	11	0	0	11
Canada	17	9	0	26
Chile	3	0	0	3
Colombia	8	0	0	8
Costa Rica (2015)	17	0	0	17
Croatia	66	33	0	99
Cyprus	58	2	0	60
Denmark	142	14	0	156
Dominican Republic	26	0	0	26
Estonia	2	1	0	3
Finland	1	1	0	2
France (inc. territories)	398	104	1	503
Germany	35	90	0	125
Greece	583	17	17	617
Iceland	2	2	16	20
India	12	0	0	12
Ireland	85	9	0	94
Israel	59	3	0	62
Italy	485	81	0	566
Japan	12	2	0	14
Jordan	8	2	0	10
Latvia	12	1	0	10
Lithuania	12	1	0	13
Malta	13	0	0	13
Mexico	77	1	43	121
Montenegro	18	0	0	18
Morocco	28	4	0	32
Netherlands	57	143	0	200
New Zealand (2015)	0	2	1	3
Norway	18	3	10	31
Panama (2015)	17	0	0	17
Poland	31	5	0	36
Portugal	398	19	23	440
Puerto Rico	2	1	12	15
Romania	5	0	0	5
Serbia	1	0	0	1
Slovenia	11	2	0	13
South Africa	46	4	7	57
South Korea	4	0	0	4
Spain	638	102	7	747
Sweden	8	13	0	21
Trinidad and Tobago	1	0	0	1
Tunisia (2015)	28	2	0	30
Turkey	567	27	20	614
United Arab Emirates	41	1	0	42
Ukraine	1	0	0	1
United Kingdom	103	11	0	114
United States	2	0	0	2
US Virgin Islands	3	0	0	3

== History ==
The Blue Flag was inspired by the "Message to the Sea" campaign (initiated by Marcel Clébant), where students wrote messages and put them inside bottles. These were dropped in the Atlantic Ocean with the intent of washing up onshore on different beaches and increasing awareness of human action harming the oceans. (The current logo of the Blue Flag evolved from the logo of the "Message to the Sea" campaign, with the exception that it doesn't include the image of a bottle.)

The Blue Flag was then officially created in France in 1985. It started as a pilot scheme from the Office of the Foundation for Environmental Education in Europe (Office français de la Fondation pour l'Education à l'Environnement en Europe) where French coastal municipalities were awarded the Blue Flag on the basis of criteria covering sewage treatment and bathing water quality. Eleven French municipalities got the award in 1985.

=== Blue Flag on European Community level in 1987 ===
1987 was the "European Year of the Environment" and the European Commission was responsible for developing the European Community activities of that year. The Foundation for Environmental Education in Europe (FEEE) presented the concept of the Blue Flag to the commission, and it was agreed to launch the Blue Flag Programme as one of several "European Year of the Environment" activities in the Community. The European Commission co-sponsored the Blue Flag for the next 11 years.

The concept of the Blue Flag was developed on the European level to include other areas of environmental management, such as waste management and coastal planning and protection. Besides beaches, marinas also became eligible for the Blue Flag. In 1987, 244 beaches and 208 marinas from ten countries were awarded the Blue Flag.

Many challenges arose from the advertisement of Blue Flags during this time. For example, some popular beaches would not have been eligible for the Blue Flag certification, leading to a questioning of its criteria and motives. However, some lesser-known locations gained attention for following the Blue Flag's criteria.

=== Success ===
There have been increases in the numbers of Blue Flags awarded each year. The criteria have during these years been changed to more strict criteria. As an example, in 1992 the Programme started using the restrictive guideline values in the EEC Bathing Water Directive as imperative criteria, and this was also the year where all Blue Flag criteria became the same in all participating countries.

=== Outside the European Union ===
In 2001, FEEE rules were changed to allow non-European national organizations, sharing the objectives of FEEE, to become members, and changed its name by dropping Europe from its name, becoming the Foundation for Environmental Education (FEE).

Several organizations and authorities outside the European Union have joined FEE. In 2001, South Africa and several Caribbean countries joined. FEE has been cooperating with UNEP and UNWTO on extending the Programme to areas outside Europe. South Africa, Canada, Morocco, Tunisia, New Zealand and four countries in the Caribbean region are members of FEE. Aruba and Brazil are currently in the pilot phase of the Programme and Jordan, North Macedonia, Turks & Caicos Islands, Ukraine and United Arab Emirates have started the implementation of the Blue Flag Programme.

FEE standards allow for regional variations in beach criteria to reflect specific environmental conditions of a region. As of 2006, an international set of criteria is being used with some variations.

=== Extension of the award to sustainable boating tourism operators ===
In 2016, Blue Flag extended its programmed boat-based tourism activities like nature watching (whale watching, bird watching, cage diving, etc.), recreational fishing, diving, and crewed charter tours. Certified tour operators have to comply with criteria regarding the sustainable operation of their boats and their business as a whole.

=== Present program ===
There are 81 countries and two US territories participating in the Blue Flag program, including Albania, Argentina, Bahamas, Belgium, Brazil, Bulgaria, Canada, Chile, Colombia, Costa Rica, Croatia, Cyprus, Denmark, Dominican Republic, England, Estonia, Finland, France, Germany, Greece, Iceland, India, Ireland, Israel, Italy, Jordan, Latvia, Lithuania, Malta, Mexico, Montenegro, Morocco, Netherlands, New Zealand, Northern Ireland, Norway, Panama, Poland, Portugal, Puerto Rico, Romania, Serbia, Slovenia, South Africa, South Korea, Spain, Sweden, Tunisia, Trinidad and Tobago, Turkey, United Arab Emirates, Ukraine, the United States of America, the US Virgin Islands, and Wales.

== Blue Flag beach criteria ==
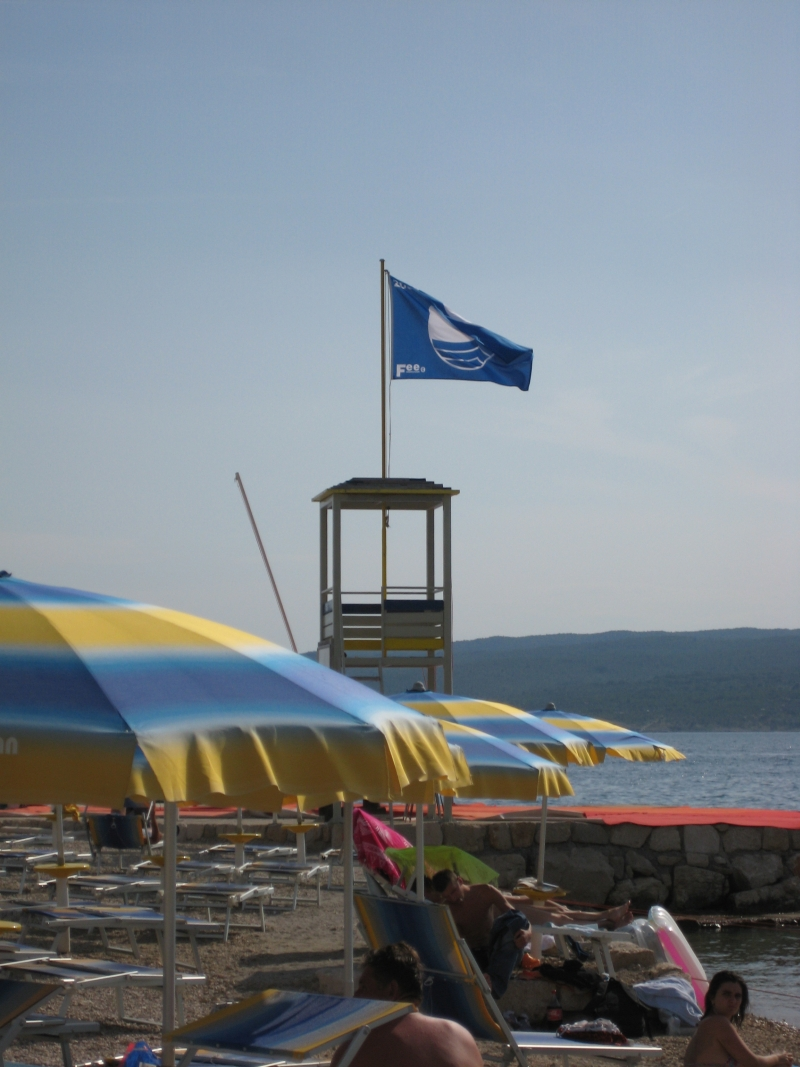
Blue Flag beach in Selce, Croatia

=== Environmental education and information ===
There are six criteria that Blue Flag beaches must adhere to that deal with to environmental education and information. For one, details about the Blue Flag Program must be visible. Secondly, a minimum of five environmental education events should be provided. Next, information about the water quality of the ocean must be presented. Additionally, details on the surrounding ecosystem and nearby cultural locations. Furthermore, a map that lays out the beach facilities should be exhibited. Finally, a code of conduct for the area has to be visible.

=== Water quality ===
There are five criteria Blue Flag beaches must meet regarding water quality. One is that samples must be taken according to the Blue Flag's requirements. Additionally, the beach must meet the Blue Flag's requisites for water quality. Also, no industrial or sewage waste can influence in the area. To continue, the beach must have less than a certain number of escherichia coli and intestinal enterococci. Finally, the beach has to be free of litter and pollution.

=== Environmental management ===
There are fifteen criteria that a beach must meet related to environmental management to be certified the Blue Flag. The first is that a beach oversight committee must be created to make sure all the other criteria related to environmental management are met. Next, those in charge of the beach or local area must follow the rules pertaining to administration of the beach. The third criterion is that ecologically vulnerable areas must be treated and protected. The fourth criterion is that the beach has to be kept clean. Furthermore, seaweed and other sources of natural remains should be left, but not to the point that its considered dangerous or deeply annoying. To continue, a sufficient amount of trash bins and recycling bins have to be made available to the public and be regularly attended to. The seventh criterion is that recycling bins have to be available to the public, if there is a recycling facility that can receive and separate this. The eighth criterion is that a reasonable number of restrooms should also be made available to the public. Moreover, they should be maintained, and resulting waste must be responsibly disposed of. The eleventh criterion is that dumping and camping can not be allowed on the beach. Only emergency and maintenance vehicles are allowed on the beach. The next criterion is that dogs and other pets cannot be at the beach. The thirteenth criterion is that all structures and paraphernalia should be kept in good and safe conditions. The fourteenth criterion is that local vulnerable ecosystems, such as coral reefs, have to be kept under observation. The final criterion is that a sustainable methods of transportation should be stimulated.

=== Safety and services ===
There are seven criteria dealing with safety and services that Blue Flag beaches must follow. The first is that there should be reasonable and protective safety regulation, such as providing lifeguards or life jackets. The second criterion is that first aid instruments have to be accessible. The third is that there has to be plans prepared to deal with emergency instances of pollution to the beach. The fourth criterion is that measures for respectful and responsible use of the beach for different activities such as swimming and jet skiing have to be implemented. The fifth criterion asks that means to ensure safe public use have to be in place. The sixth criterion mandates that drinking water has to be accessible at the beach. The final criterion requests that at least one Blue Flag beach in each municipality has to be made accessible for the physically disabled.

== Blue Flag marina criteria ==
=== Environmental education and information ===
- Environmental information about natural sensitive nearby land and marine areas is supplied to marina users.
- Code of environmental conduct is posted in the marina.
- Information about the Blue Flag Marina Programme and/or the Blue Flag Marina Criteria are posted in the marina.
- The marina should be able to demonstrate that at least three environmental education activities are offered to the users and staff of the marina
- The Individual Blue Flag for boat owners is offered through the marina.

=== Environmental management ===
- Production of an environmental policy and plan at the marina. The plan should include references to water, waste and energy consumption, health and safety issues, and the use of environmentally sound products when available.
- Adequate and properly identified and segregated containers for the storage of hazardous wastes (paints, solvents, boat scrapings, antifouling agents, batteries, waste oil, flares). The wastes should be handled by a licensed contractor and disposed of at a licensed facility for hazardous waste.
- Adequate and well managed litter bins and/or garbage containers. The wastes should be handled by a licensed contractor and disposed of by a licensed facility.
- The marina has facilities for receiving recyclable waste materials, such as bottles, cans, paper, plastic, organic material, etc.
- Bilge water pumping facilities are present in the marina.
- Toilet pumping facilities are present in the marina.
- All buildings and equipment must be properly maintained and in compliance with national legislation. The marina must be in a good integration with the surrounding natural and built environment.
- Adequate, clean and well sign-posted sanitary facilities, including washing facilities and drinking water. Controlled sewage disposal to a licensed sewage treatment.
- If the marina has boat repairing and washing areas, no pollution must enter the sewage system, marina land and water or the natural surroundings.
- Promotion of sustainable transportation.
- No parking/driving in the marina, unless in specific designated areas.

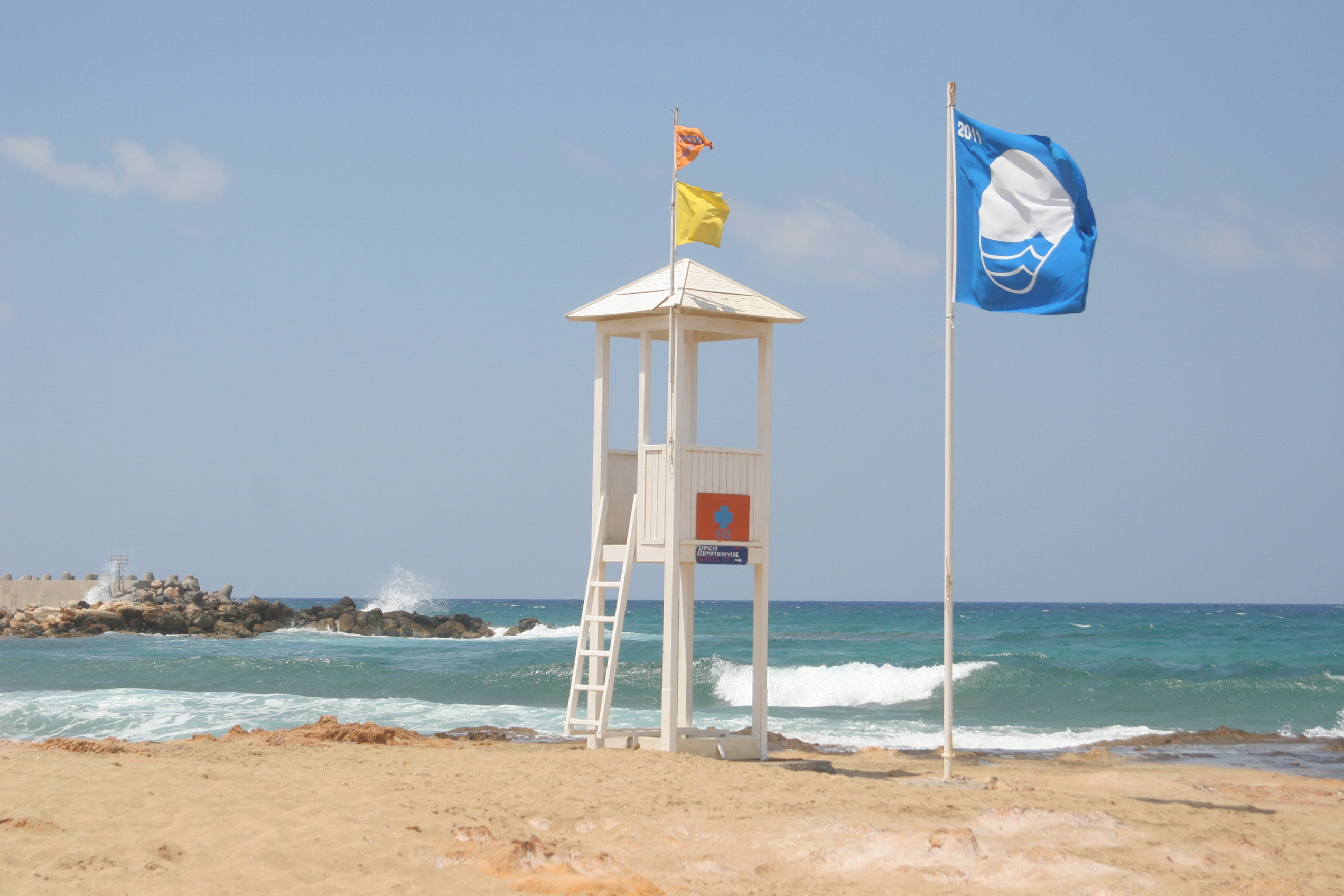
Blue Flag beach in Malia, Crete, Greece

=== Safety and service ===
- Adequate, clean and well sign-posted lifesaving, first-aid equipment and fire-fighting equipment. Equipment must be approved by national authorities.
- Emergency plan in case of pollution, fire or other accidents must be produced.
- Safety precautions and information must be posted at the marina.
- Electricity and water is available at the berths, installations must be approved according to national legislation.
- Facilities for disabled people.
- Map indicating the location of the different facilities is posted at the marina.

=== Water quality ===
- Visually clean water (no oil, litter, sewage or other evidence of pollution).

Microbiological test as evidence for bacterial free

== Blue Flag sustainable boating tourism operator criteria ==
=== Environmental education and information ===
- Information to relevant local environmental phenomena, local ecosystems and sensitive areas in the surrounding environment
- Information about the Blue Flag programme
- Code of conduct for passengers which includes the adequate disposal of litter, smoking policy on board, safety measures and the adequate behaviour during an encounter with wild animals
- At least one environmental education activity has to be offered within the operating season
- Environmental training for all employees
- Provision of a qualified guide on guided tours

=== Environmental management ===
- It is recommended to establish a management committee with responsibility for instituting environmental management systems and conducting regular environmental audits
- Each tour operator has to have an environmental policy and an environmental plan
- All regulations pertaining to the location and the operation of the boats have to be complied with
- Use of adequate, properly identified and segregated containers for the storage of hazardous wastes
- Use of adequate litter bins, including recycling bins
- Correct disposal of all wastes produced by the tourists and the tour operator
- Use of recyclable products, biodegradable materials and environmentally friendly toiletries and cleaning products
- Smoking should be prohibited on the boats
- Correct treatment of bilge water
- Provision of adequate sanitary facilities with correct sewage disposal
- Repair and paint works on the boats must be limited to specifically designated areas
- Promotion of sustainable means of transportation from and to the boats
- Report of accidents that might cause environmental damages
- Speed and engine maintenance of the boats must be aimed at maximising energy efficiency and minimising pollution
- Environmentally friendly anchoring
- Correct disposal of boats that have reached the end of their life service

=== Safety and services ===
- Provision of adequate and well-signposted lifesaving, first-aid and fire-fighting equipment which has been approved by relevant national authorities
- Provision of emergency plans for different possible kinds of accidents and regular emergency trainings for the crew
- Safety precautions and information must be presented on the boat
- Facilities for people with disabilities should be in place
- Adequate signage indicating the location of the different facilities on the boats

=== Social responsibility ===
- Discrimination based on gender, sexual orientation, disabilities, origin or religious affiliation should not be accepted within the tour operator
- Payment of fair salaries according to the respective income level in the country
- The legal working age in the respective country should be respected
- The tour operator should support the local economy by choosing to buy and use local products

=== Responsible tourism ===
- Vulnerable and protected areas must be respected
- Any wildlife must be approached at a slow speed and in a manner that allows the animal(s) to evaluate the situation. They must not be encircled, trapped or chased
- Special precaution must be taken in the vicinity of breeding animals. Young animals must not be separated from their group
- When in the direct vicinity of any wildlife, noise must be reduced to a minimum and the engine should be put into neutral whenever appropriate
- No animals or plants are to be touched or collected
- Tourists and employees must not feed the animals
- If there are any signs of disturbance, the boat must increase its distance from the animals
- The tour operator should be open to cooperation with research institutions. The company's vessel might function as a research platform, and collected data of wildlife sightings should be made available to researchers
- Injured, entangled, stranded or dead animals must be reported to the local authorities

=== Additional criteria for specific wildlife-based activities ===
The criteria presented above apply to all tour operators that want to be awarded the Blue Flag. In addition, tour operators that offer whale watching, bird watching, seal watching, cage diving, recreational fishing and diving have to comply with additional criteria for the respective activity. These criteria are tailored to the different tourist experiences and take into account the specific environmental issues related to them. They include for example approach distances to different animal species, the correct use of equipment and the humane handling of animals that are caught during recreational fishing tours.
