= Foundation for Environmental Education =

Non-governmental, non-profit organisation

- Abbreviation: FEE
- Formation: 1981; 45 years ago
- Type: NGO
- Legal status: Non-profit
- Headquarters: Copenhagen, Denmark
- Region served: Worldwide
- Main organ: General Assembly
- Staff: 15
- Website: http://www.fee.global/

The Foundation for Environmental Education (FEE) is a non-governmental, non-profit organization promoting sustainable development through environmental education. FEE is active through five programmes; Blue Flag, Eco-Schools, Young Reporters for the Environment (YRE), Learning about Forests (LEAF) and Green Key International. It has members in 77 countries worldwide.

== Member organisations ==
FEE is an international umbrella organisation with one national member organisation per country representing FEE on the national level and in charge of implementing FEE programmes nationally. FEE has member organisations in 77 countries worldwide.

When a national organisation is accepted as member of FEE it becomes “associate member of FEE”. Within 3–5 years of FEE membership, the organisation must become “full member of FEE” (which means that it has fully implemented at least two FEE programmes).

Besides the national associate/full FEE member organizations, international institutions/organisations or other national organisations can also become affiliate member of FEE, and FEE does, furthermore, have some individual persons as honorary member of FEE.

== History ==
The Foundation for Environmental Education was established in 1981 as the Foundation for Environmental Education in Europe (FEEE). However, at its 20th anniversary general assembly, held in Copenhagen in 2001, the organisation decided, because of growing interest from outside Europe, to become more global and dropped "Europe" from its name to become the Foundation for Environmental Education (FEE).

The Blue Flag Programme was launched in 1985 in France. In 1987, the idea of the award scheme was presented to FEE. This year was also the European Year for the Environment initiated by the European Union, so Blue Flag was launched on the European level (10 countries) in a partnership between FEE and the European Commission.

In 1987, there were only five national FEE member organisations (Italy, Spain, France, Germany and Denmark). After the launch of Blue Flag in other six European countries, FEE started to require organisations as members of FEE to run Blue Flag. In the late 1980s and in the beginning of the 1990s, big constitutional changes were made for FEE.

In 1994, the Eco-Schools and the Young Reporters for the Environment Programmes were implemented as second and third programmes of FEE.

The Learning about Forests (LEAF) programme started in 2000 and the Green Key Programme in 2003. They were already nationally existing programmes before that but were implemented these to years as FEE programmes with the use of external steering committees.

In the mid-1990s a co-operation with United Nations Environment Programme (UNEP) and World Tourism Organization (UNWTO), was established and a manual for coastal zone management with the example of the Blue Flag was produced. With a further support from UNEP, workshops were held in Caribbean, Africa and Asia. An interest grew rapidly in the Caribbean area and a very solid interest was shown from South Africa.

In 2003, FEE signed a “Memorandum of Understanding” (MoU) with UNEP which "formalises long-standing relationship between UNEP and FEE and provides a framework for long term co-operation on areas of common interest relating to education, training and public awareness for sustainable development globally". This MoU provides a solid basis for furthering the work already undertaken in collaboration between FEE and UNEP, in particular with regard to the introduction of FEE programmes and associated activities, particularly in developing countries and those with economies in transition.

Another MoU was signed in 2007 with the UN World Tourism Organization, where especially the tourism related programmes of FEE was recognised.

== FEE's Global Forest Fund ==
As an organisation promoting sustainable development, FEE established the Global Forest Fund to offset CO_{2} emissions from travel. This non-profit fund invests 90% of its income directly into tree planting and other CO_{2} compensation efforts that are combined with environmental education activities.

== Young Reporters for the Environment ==
Young Reporters for the Environment is a programme of the foundation. An international network of youth in more than 25 countries, it promotes solutions to environmental issues through investigative journalism.

At the national level, participants choose local environmental issues to investigate, with the goal of communicating relevant information and solutions to the general public. The students carry out real journalistic enquiries and report their findings in the form of an article, photograph/photographic essay or video.

An international competition is also held annually.

== Programmes ==
The Foundation for Environmental Education is a non-governmental, non-profit organisation promoting sustainable development through environmental education, and is active in five programmes:

- Blue Flag
- Eco-Schools
- Learning about Forests (LEAF)
- Green Key International
- Eco-Schools
