= Condo hotel =

Condominium operated as a hotel

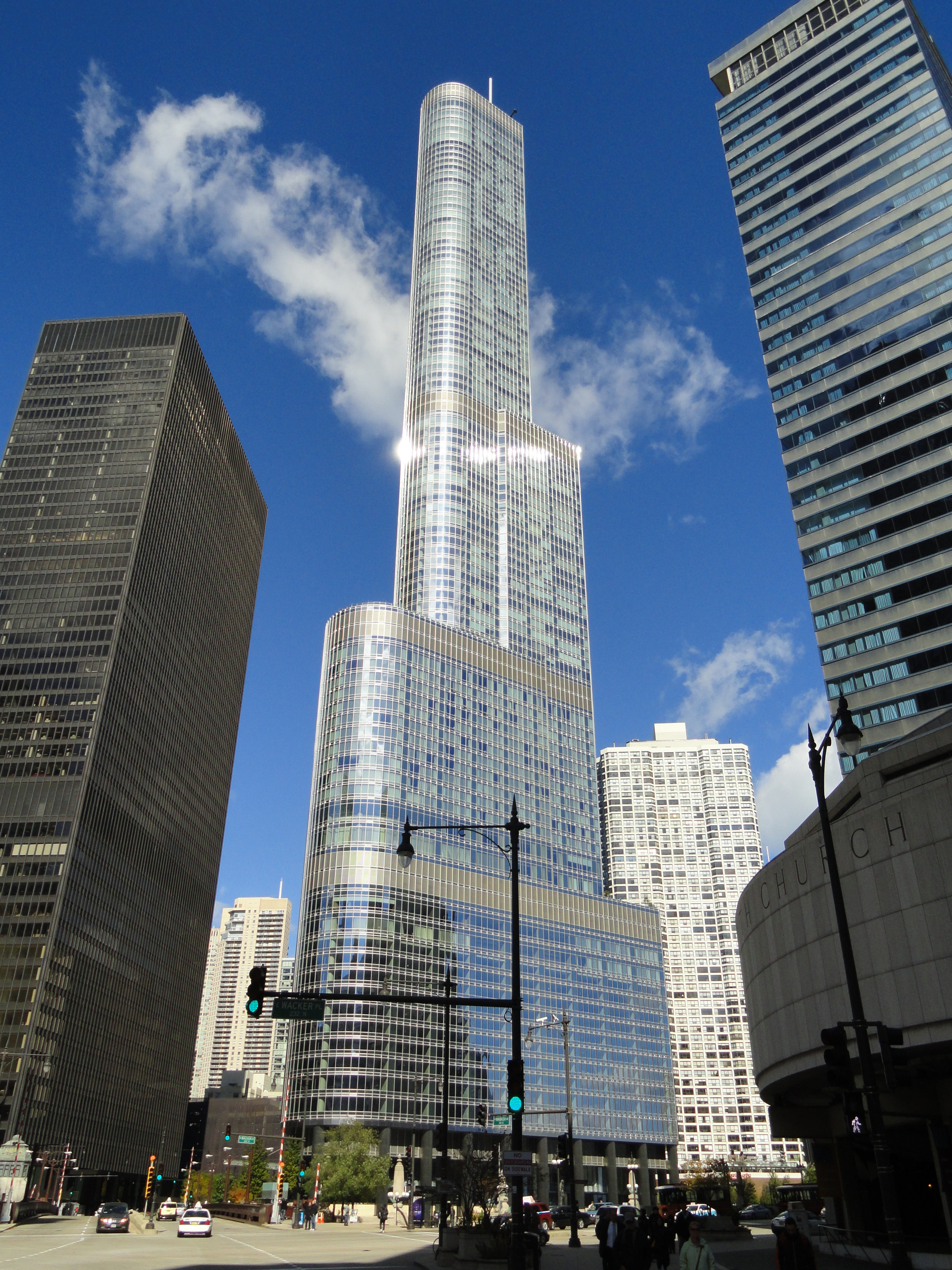
Trump International Hotel and Tower (Chicago)

A condo hotel, also known as a condotel, hotel condo, or a contel, is a building that is legally a condominium but operates as a hotel, offering short-term rentals, and which maintains a front desk.

Condo hotels are typically high-rise buildings developed and operated as luxury hotels, usually in major cities and resorts. These hotels have condominium units that allow someone to own a full-service vacation home. When they are not using this home, they can leverage the marketing and management done by the hotel chain to rent and manage the condo unit as it would any other hotel room.

== Legal conflicts ==
The U.S. Government is very strict about the type of advertising that can be done vis-à-vis condo hotel projects. Some condo projects have advertised themselves as real estate investments, but, since the value of these condos as a real estate investment is not entirely clear the U.S. Government currently disallows use of this reference when advertising condo hotels.

Condo hotels have been criticized in California for allowing developers to skirt laws designed to protect public access to beaches. Because such a facility has hotel rooms, it can be classified as a public accommodation, even though the majority of the units are privately held, and the facility does little to accommodate the public.

In the Philippines, condominium hotels carry a condominium real estate deed. This allows foreigners to acquire up to 30% of the condotel units, unlike most other real estate. This has made this particular development popular in the country.

== Locations ==
While not intended as a complete list, the most popular locations in the U.S. for condo hotels include: Aspen, Chicago, Miami, Fort Lauderdale, the Las Vegas Valley, New York City, Myrtle Beach, South Carolina, and Orlando, Florida. Condo hotels are also found at ski resorts and international destinations, such as Jaco, Costa Rica, Thailand, and most recently Sint Maarten. Investors spent an estimated $250 million on condo hotels in 2006, with much of that spending concentrated on resort areas.

== Costs ==
Analyzing the economics of a condo hotel unit is extremely difficult because of the challenge of getting accurate information about the potential income stream. Developers uniformly do not provide important data or estimates for room rates or occupancy levels for fear of coming under U.S. Securities and Exchange Commission (SEC) regulations on investments, as opposed to real estate regulations.

== Financial considerations ==
The primary factors that contribute to the financial outcome in ownership are rental revenue, appreciation or depreciation, lending and tax deductions.

Rental revenue is shared with the management company, and owners typically pay no upfront fees for management, which includes the marketing and reservation of the units. Typical monthly fees for units in the rental pool include FF&E (Furniture, Fixtures and Equipment) reserve and resort fee(s). Although the revenue splits between owner and management company do vary from project to project, most hover around 50 percent. Most condo hotels, and especially branded hotels like Westin or Ritz-Carlton, are strategically located in resort economies or popular urban destinations, which allow for high nightly rates and consistent year-round occupancy. Rental income from hotel guests is at the mercy of travel patterns and may decline.

Many condo hotels, especially the branded condo hotels, have seen double-digit growth, and have out-performed traditional condos or single family homes in the same resort market. Condo hotels units are fee simple deeded real estate, and can be bought and sold like other forms of real estate. Because of the lack of resale data available for many of the emerging markets where pre-construction condo hotels can be found, experts heed caution when considering a condo hotel purchase for investment purposes alone. Just like traditional real estate, appreciation is never guaranteed. This very scenario most recently occurred in Las Vegas. Several of the more notable condo hotels have sold for less in the resale market than during pre-construction.

Financing is generally costlier than for a primary residence. Mortgage rates may be a full point higher, and in the past this was especially true because financial institutions were unfamiliar with the condo hotel concept. Pre-construction purchases require a significant down payment, and buyers will not see financial return or be able to use their unit until the hotel is completed and ready for operation. Furthermore, owners may have to purchase extra insurance to protect against liability claims and some types of damage or loss.

Additional tax benefits may be obtained through condo hotel ownership. If the condo hotel is used for non-primary residence or residential rental, owners may be able to accelerate the depreciation on their condo hotel unit from 39 years, down to 27.5, 15, 7, and even 5 years. Condo hotel tax laws determine this, and affect individuals on a case-by-case basis, as each potential buyer's tax situation is different.

== Homeowners' association fees and services ==
As with most condominiums, owners of condo-hotel units are required to pay homeowners' association fees, commonly referred to as HOAs. The fee and services can vary a great deal. Factors causing a fluctuation are the hotel's star rating and operation level, and its physical location. A property located on the ocean, for example, can experience coastal weather on a regular basis, which in turn can increase the need for more regular maintenance to the exterior of the building. Along those same lines, a property located in a ski resort must weather powerful winter storms and must also deal with snow removal services.

Exceptions aside, many of the fees and services found in HOAs are fixed and fluctuate very little from project to project. Services such as these usually include general unit utilities, common area utilities, individual room and building reserves, grounds maintenance, exercise area use fees, security, pest control, mechanical repair costs, safety alarm systems, parking area maintenance, pool area maintenance, and owner management and administrative services. Items related to hotel guest impact are generally not included in the HOA fees; these include housekeeping, and costs related to hotel staffing and operation.
