= Green Key Global =

Eco-certification for hotels and venues

- Founded: 1994; 32 years ago
- Headquarters: Ottawa, Canada
- Areas served: Canada & U.S.
- Website: www.greenkeyglobal.com

Green Key Global is an international eco-label which certifies hotels and venues operating in Canada and the United States. The industry-run group is based in Ottawa and has over 2,500 participating facilities.

== History ==
Since April 2024, Hotels Canada (HC) and the American Hotel and Lodging Association (AHLA) jointly operate the label Green Key Global, making the label available in the United States.

== Description ==
The Eco-Rating certification is based on a self-assessment and mandatory audit, with facilities receiving a certification of one to five keys. As the only environmental certification designed for the hotel and meeting industry, the program offers members valuable tools and individual guidance on how to manage and improve their property’s environmental performance.

The Green Key Meetings program is a verification program designed specifically for hospitality venues and meeting spaces committed to responsible operations. Hotels with significant meeting spaces, convention centers, or standalone venues, can participate in this program to demonstrate environmental leadership and take the next step in embedding sustainability into their events.
