= Green Key International =

Eco-certificate for hospitality facilities

Green Key
- Founded: 1994; 32 years ago
- Headquarters: Copenhagen, Denmark
- Areas served: Worldwide (except for the US and Canada)
- Owner: Foundation for Environmental Education
- Website: www.greenkey.global

Green Key International is an international eco-certificate for accommodations and other hospitality facilities that commit to sustainable business practices. Certified establishments comply with strict criteria, independently verified through regular on-site audits.

It aims to contribute to the prevention of climate change by awarding and advocating facilities with positive environmental initiatives. Green Key is a non-governmental, non-profit, independent programme operating under the umbrella organisation of the Foundation for Environmental Education (FEE). The programme is recognised and supported by the World Tourism Organization (WTO) and United Nations Environmental Programme (UNEP). Green Key has an international programme administration at the FEE Head Office in Copenhagen and Green Key National Operators in most member countries implementing the programme on national levels.

Green Key is one of the largest eco-certificates for the hospitality industry worldwide and currently has more than 6,000 certified hotels and other establishments in 70+ countries.

== Aims ==
Green Key aims to

- Increase the use of environmentally friendly and sustainable methods of operation and technology in the establishments and thereby reduce the overall use of resources.
- Raise awareness and create behavioural changes in guests, staff and suppliers of individual tourism establishments.
- Increase the use of environmentally friendly and sustainable methods and raise awareness to create behavioural changes in the hospitality and tourism industry overall.

== History ==
Green Key International began in Denmark in 1994 and was adopted by the Foundation for Environmental Education in 2000 to become its fifth international partner. It has since spread to nearly 70 countries and continues to grow in number and reach across the world.

Commercial websites, such as Bookdifferent.com, is partnering with Green Key to entice travelers to book eco friendly hotels.

== Criteria ==
Tourism facilities certified with Green Key adhere to international Green Key criteria. The criteria have been designed to be easily understood by travellers, feasible for the tourism industry, and clearly verifiable through control checks.

International criteria reflect the various fields of tourism facilities (hotels, hostels, camp sites, conference and holiday centres, tourist attractions and restaurants) and specialized national criteria reflect each country's legislation, infrastructure and culture.

The criteria focus on environmental management, technical demands and initiatives for the involvement of guests, staff and suppliers. Some of the categories covered are: Water, Waste, Energy, Involvement and Awareness of Guests, Environmental Management, Staff Involvement, Use of Chemicals, Open Spaces, and Food and Beverages.

== Five pillars ==
The Green Key programme rests on five pillars:

- Education of staff, clients and owners towards increased sustainable development and environmental awareness in leisure establishments;
- Environmental preservation by the reduction of the environmental impact of each establishment in the world scene;
- Economical management by the reduction of consumption meaning a reduction of costs;
- Marketing strategy by the promotion of the Green Key certificate and the establishments using the Green Key icon;
- Strengthening of the tourism and leisure branch by taking responsibility broader than then their individual establishments.

== Similar certifications ==
Green Globe is a similar program offering a certification process for the hospitality industry.
