= Clarion Hotel and Casino =

Historic hotel and casino in Las Vegas, Nevada

Coordinates: 36.1318°N 115.1591°W

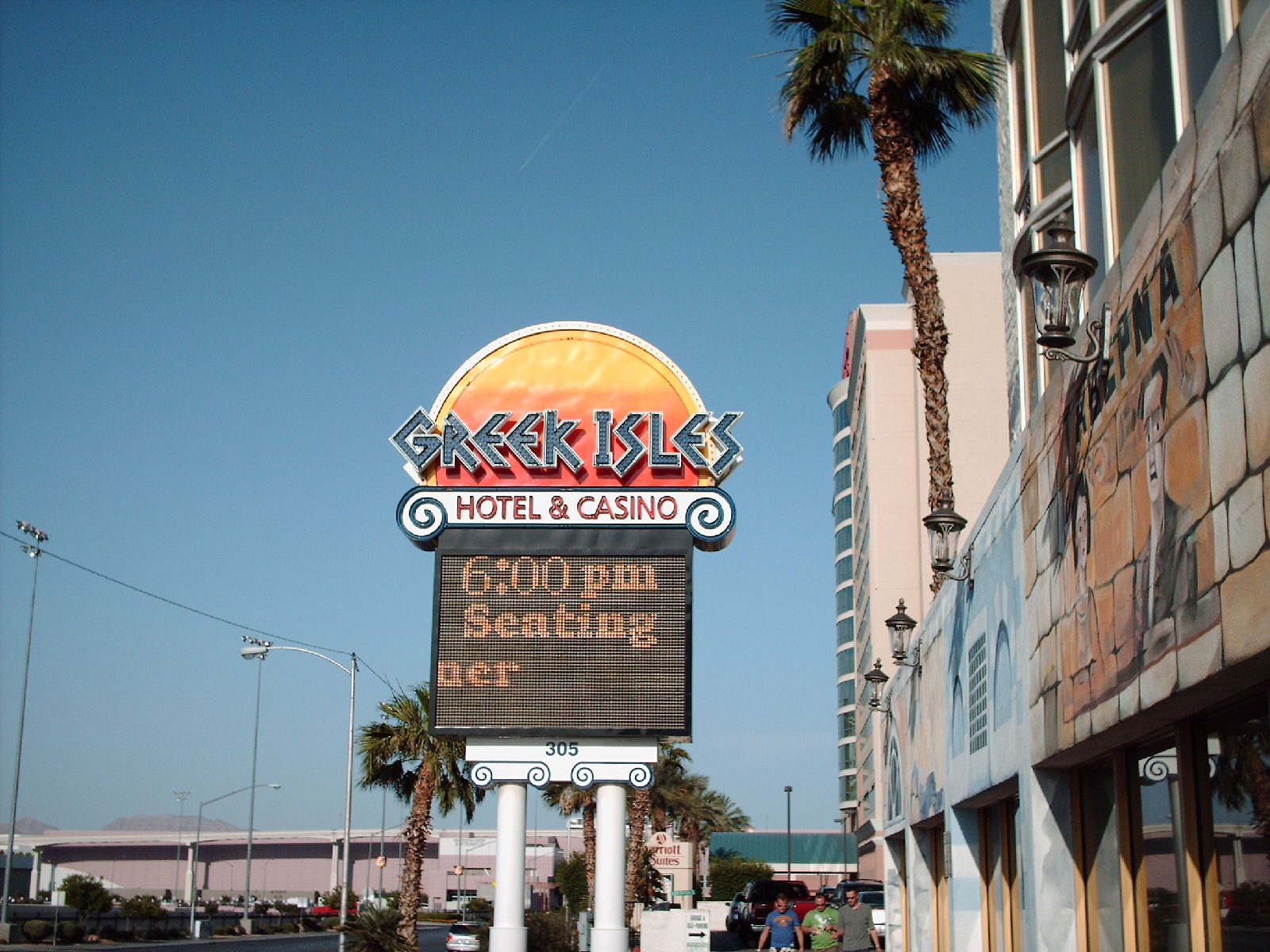
- The property in 2007, known then as the Greek Isles

- Location within Las Vegas Strip Location within Nevada
- Interactive map of Clarion Hotel and Casino
- Location: Winchester, Nevada 89109; 305 Convention Center Drive
- Opened: April 19, 1970
- Closed: September 1, 2014; 12 years ago
- No. of rooms: 202
- Gaming space: 6,600 sq ft (610 m^{2})
- Casino type: Land
- Operating license holder: Jackpot Enterprises (1993–96); Capado Gaming (1997–98); United Coin (2000s)
- Previous names: Royal Inn (1970–80); Royal Americana Hotel (1980–82); Paddlewheel (1983–91); Debbie Reynolds Hotel (1993–98); Greek Isles (2001–10)
- Renovated in: 1980, 1983, 1993, 2001
- Website: http://www.clarionhotelvegas.com/ (archive)

Clarion Hotel and Casino was located near the Las Vegas Strip in Winchester, Nevada. It included a 12-story hotel with approximately 200 rooms, and a small casino. The property opened as the Royal Inn Hotel of Las Vegas on April 19, 1970. It was renamed Royal Americana Hotel & Casino in 1980, and then Paddlewheel Hotel & Casino in 1983.

Actress Debbie Reynolds purchased the property in 1992, and renamed it a year later as the Debbie Reynolds Hotel/Casino/Hollywood Movie Museum. The renovated property included a museum featuring Reynolds' collection of Hollywood memorabilia. The hotel struggled financially, entering bankruptcy in 1997. It was sold a year later to the World Wrestling Federation, which planned to demolish the hotel and build a wrestling themed resort on the land. The project was ultimately canceled, and ownership would change several more times. Following another renovation, the property operated as the Greek Isles Hotel & Casino from 2001 to 2010, and then under the Clarion brand until its closure on September 1, 2014.

Developer Lorenzo Doumani bought the hotel-casino a month after its closure, and had it demolished for redevelopment. The hotel tower was imploded on February 10, 2015. Four years later, Doumani unveiled plans to build a high-rise hotel, Majestic Las Vegas, on the site. However, the start of construction has been delayed several times as of 2026.

== History ==
=== Early years (1970–1991) ===
The property originated as part of the Royal Inns of America chain, with construction beginning on August 1, 1969. The $3 million Royal Inn Hotel of Las Vegas (Note: Not to be confused with the nearby Royal Resort, also located on Convention Center Drive.) opened on April 19, 1970. It was built on 6 acres (2.4 ha), located just east of the Las Vegas Strip and down the street from the Las Vegas Convention Center. The 12-story hotel contained 200 rooms, and was considered small by Las Vegas standards.

In 1972, Michael Gaughan and Frank Toti bought out the property's gaming operations, and managed the casino for much of the remaining decade. In 1979, fast food operator (and former automat chain) Horn & Hardart purchased the Royal Inn for $17 million. By late 1980, the property was rebranded as the Royal Americana Hotel & Casino, with a New York theme. A $3.5 million renovation increased the room count to 300. Nevertheless, the Royal Americana was experiencing substantial losses, and Horn & Hardart decided to close it in 1982. The casino soon reopened with limited offerings, in order to maintain the property's gaming license.

An investment group, which included two Horn & Hardart executives, took over the Royal Americana at the end of 1982, and spent $5.7 million on remodeling. The property debuted as the Paddlewheel Hotel & Casino on November 21, 1983. Two adjoining structures, containing 113 rooms, were demolished. The original hotel tower was kept, and its west exterior was updated to feature a mural of a paddle steamer crashing through the building. The Paddlewheel had a child-friendly atmosphere, with arcade games and amusement rides, but shifted to an adult focus in the late 1980s, including a male revue. Horn & Hardart put the Paddlewheel back up for sale in 1990, and closed the casino in October 1991. It had 300 slot machines and four table games.

=== Debbie Reynolds ownership (1992–1998) ===
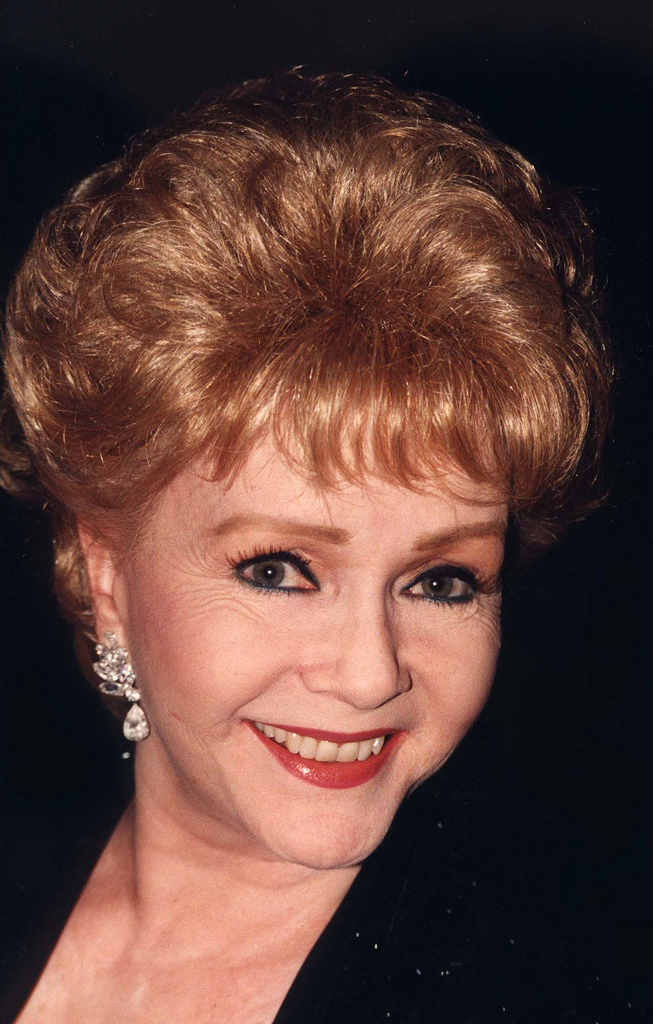
Debbie Reynolds in 1998

Actress Debbie Reynolds and her husband Richard Hamlett, at his suggestion, bought the shuttered property at auction in 1992, for $2.2 million. Reynolds planned to spend $15 million on renovations, which would include a museum to house her collection of Hollywood memorabilia.

The property reopened in July 1993, as the Debbie Reynolds Hollywood Hotel/Casino/Movie Museum. Shortly thereafter, Hollywood Casino Corp. filed a trademark infringement lawsuit against the hotel-casino. A settlement was reached by the end of 1993, with "Hollywood" dropped from the hotel's name. The property is best remembered under the Debbie Reynolds name, and the adjacent 1,000-foot Mel Avenue was eventually renamed Debbie Reynolds Drive in 1996. A sign from the Debbie Reynolds Hotel would later be acquired by the city's Neon Museum.

Because Reynolds and her husband had no experience in operating a resort, the various amenities were leased out, leaving the couple to focus on live entertainment offerings and the museum. Reynolds herself performed at the property, in a 500-seat theater designed by her son Todd Fisher. The casino, operated by Jackpot Enterprises, measured 6,600 sq ft (610 m^{2}). It included 184 slot machines and two table games.

Reynolds struggled with the financing to complete the project. She took the company public in 1994 to raise money, and the museum finally opened the following year. Rooms in the top three floors of the hotel were sold as timeshares to help raise money, and the property eventually accumulated more than 1,000 unit owners. Reynolds and Hamlett had a troubled marriage, and she eventually paid him $270,000 to buy out his interest. They divorced in 1996.

Fisher said the property was undercapitalized from the time it opened. He blamed early financial problems on mismanagement, and took over operations at the end of 1995. The casino closed in March 1996, after Fisher terminated the agreement with Jackpot as unprofitable. Reynolds could not get a gaming license to operate it in-house because of the company's poor finances.

Reynolds and the hotel both filed for bankruptcy protection in July 1997, and several deals to sell the property failed over the next year. Among the prospective buyers was Westgate Resorts, which planned to add additional timeshare units. Westgate owner David Siegel invested approximately $200,000 to keep the property operational during bankruptcy.

To maintain the site's gaming status, Capado Gaming was brought on to reopen the casino in September 1997, with 25 slot machines. The Debbie Reynolds Hotel was put up for auction in August 1998. Reynolds called it "a sad ending to a lot of hard work and special dreams," saying further, "This represents a long six years of hard work and dedication and love. But you can't look back. That's not the way I want to deal with this."

=== Later years (1998–2014) ===
The winning bidder of the 1998 auction, at $10.65 million, was the World Wrestling Federation (WWF). The company planned to level the building and construct a 35-story, wrestling themed hotel and casino with 1,000 rooms. The WWF stripped much of the interior to prepare for demolition, but ultimately decided the site was not big enough. The project's cancellation was also attributed to cost and unfamiliarity with the gaming industry.

As of 2000, the property was operating as Convention Center Drive Hotel. At the end of the year, the WWF sold it to Chicago-based Mark IV Realty Group for $11.2 million. Mark IV hoped to redevelop the site with 1,000 rooms, but instead remodeled the property with a Greek theme and renamed it the Greek Isles Hotel & Casino. The renovation project cost $1 million and included a new pool. The casino portion opened on July 20, 2001. It included 100 slot machines and was operated by United Coin. The hotel opened later in 2001, and had 192 rooms. It eventually contracted with Delta Air Lines to house flight crews during layovers.

The property offered various shows during the Greek Isles era. Among these was a Rat Pack tribute show that opened in 2002 and ran for several years. Others included a magic show, a fire-themed production, and a musical tribute to composer Harold Arlen.

In July 2007, the Greek Isles was sold to an investment group, which planned to eventually demolish the hotel-casino and redevelop the land as a mixed-use project. However, a year later, the group defaulted on a $56 million loan that was provided by Canpartners Realty. The property entered bankruptcy in April 2009, and was taken over four months later by Canpartners, which blamed the financial problems on poor management.

In 2010, the property was rebranded as a Clarion hotel, the only location at that time to include a casino. It had two performance venues at that time, with magician Jan Rouven among its entertainers. In 2012, one of the venues was used as a filming location for Lana Del Rey's 2012 short film Ride.

In its final years, the hotel included 202 rooms. The Clarion closed on September 1, 2014, and its inventory was liquidated.

=== Demolition ===
A month after its closure, developer Lorenzo Doumani purchased the Clarion from Canpartners for $22.5 million. He announced plans to demolish the hotel-casino for redevelopment as a mixed-use property. The Clarion's hotel tower was demolished by implosion on February 10, 2015, shortly before 3 a.m. It was the first hotel-casino in Las Vegas to be imploded since the New Frontier in 2007. The Clarion implosion did not go as planned; an elevator shaft on the tower's west side was left standing afterward. Debris from the collapsing tower locked the shaft in place, only allowing it to drop slightly. Later in the day, cables were lassoed around the shaft to bring it down.

In 2019, Doumani announced plans to build a non-gaming high-rise hotel known as Majestic Las Vegas on the vacant land. It has been delayed several times, and construction has not begun as of 2026.
