= Neon Museum =

The Neon Museum®
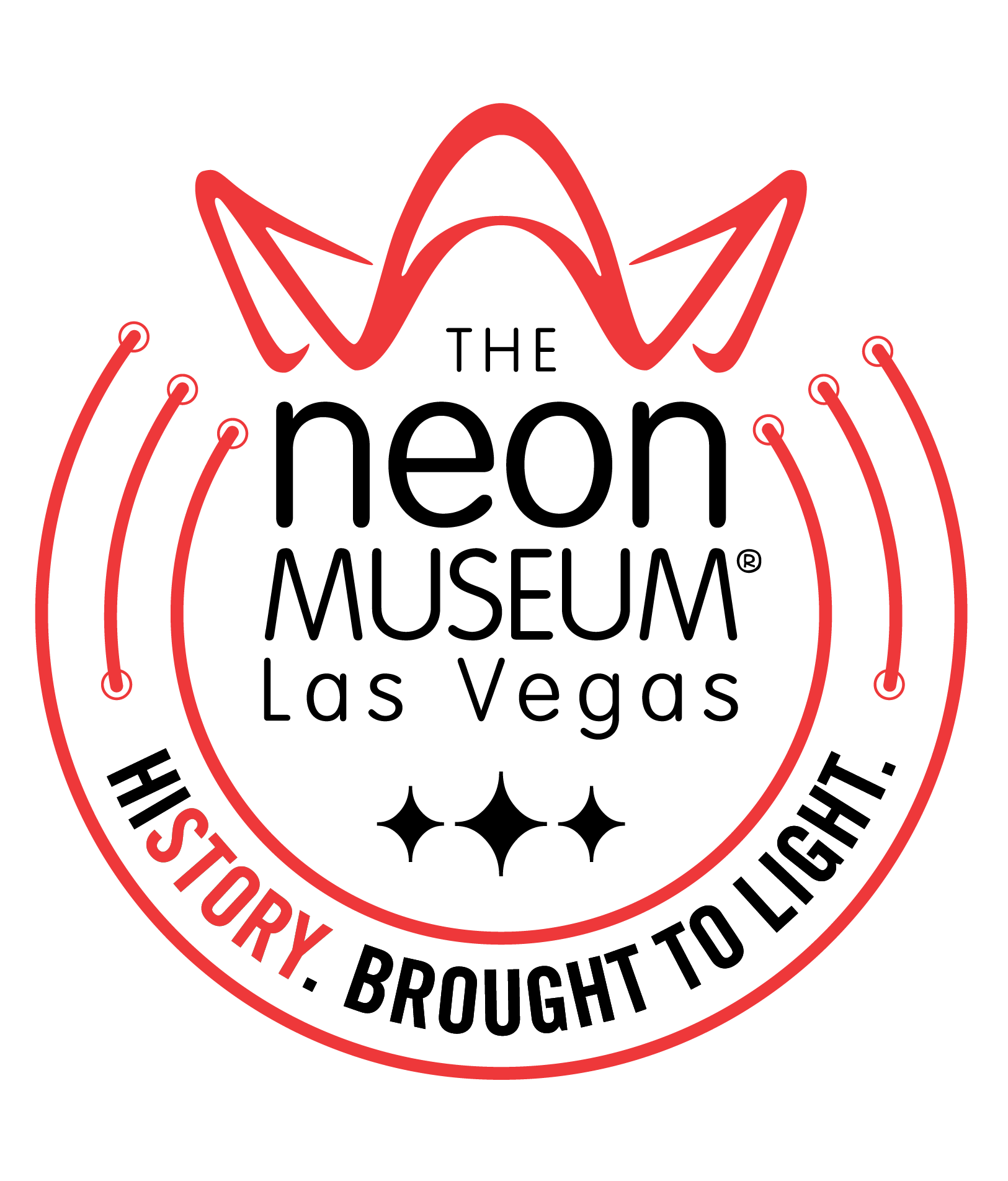

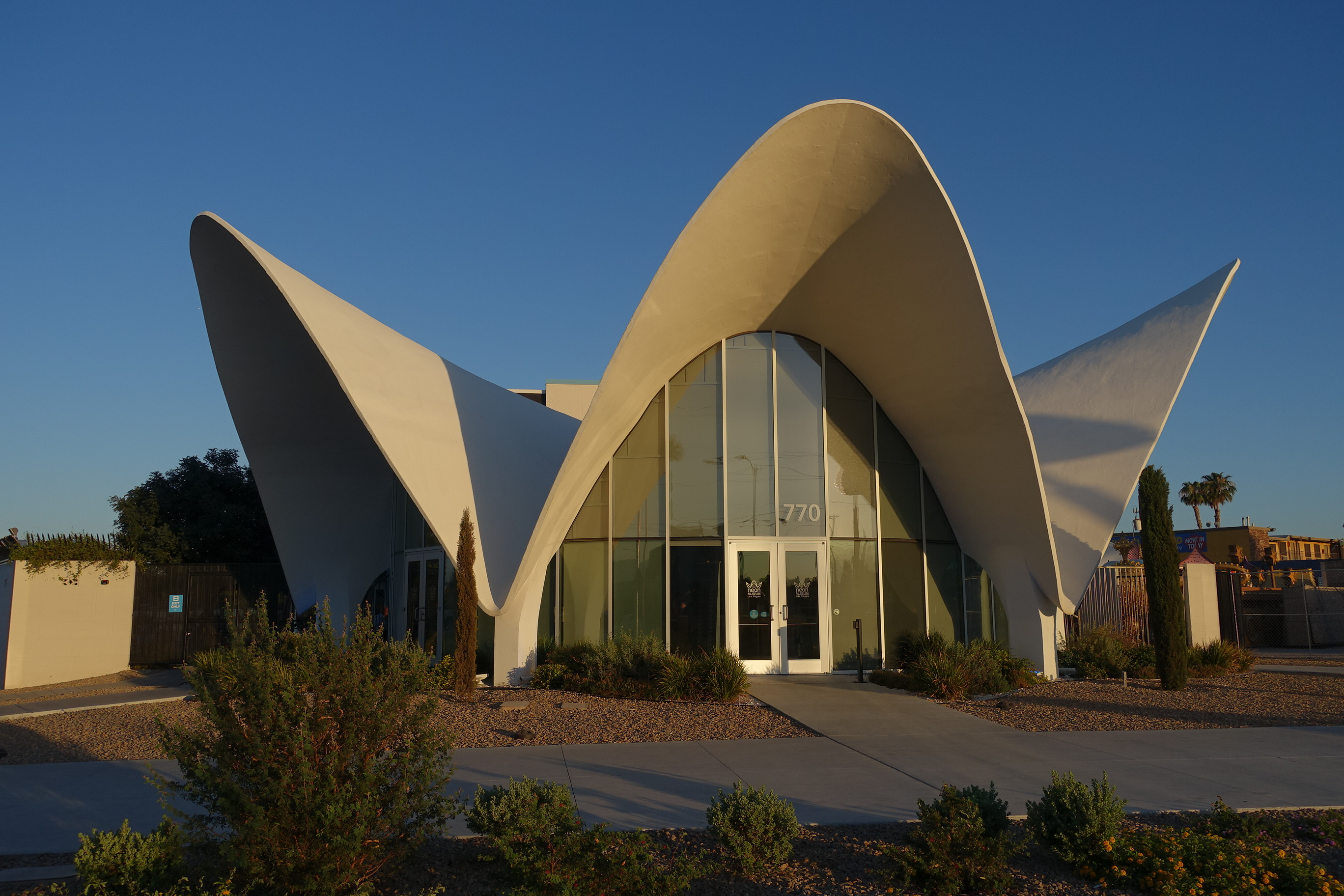
- The former La Concha Motel lobby, seen here as the Neon Museum's visitor center in 2017
- Established: 1996; October 27, 2012 (public opening)
- Location: 770 North Las Vegas Boulevard, Las Vegas, Nevada
- Coordinates: 36°10′35.4468″N 115°8′6.9972″W
- Type: Art museum
- Visitors: 1,800 (2007); 200,000 (2023)
- Website: neonmuseum.org

The Neon Museum in Las Vegas, Nevada, United States, features signs from old casinos and other businesses displayed outdoors on 2.27 acres (0.92 ha). Efforts to establish a neon sign museum were underway in the late 1980s, but stalled due to a lack of resources. On September 18, 1996, the Las Vegas City Council voted to fund such a project, to be known as The Neon Museum. The organization started out by re-installing old signage in downtown Las Vegas, to attract more visitors to the area.

Young Electric Sign Company (YESCO) had manufactured many neon signs in the city, and the company had a storage site for old signs, which would eventually become part of the Neon Museum collection. In 2000, as YESCO prepared to close its storage lot, the city provided the museum with land to start its own. Tours of the new site, known as the Neon Boneyard, began in 2001, by appointment only.

The lobby of the former La Concha Motel, located on the Las Vegas Strip, was donated to the museum and moved there in 2006, eventually becoming its visitor center. Construction to convert the lobby began in May 2011, and the museum officially opened to the general public on October 27, 2012, eliminating the appointment system.

The Neon Museum's collection includes more than 200 signs. An expansion of the museum site began in 2017, although hundreds of neon artifacts still remained in off-site storage due to space limitations. In 2024, the museum announced plans to relocate to a larger site, with several under consideration as of 2025.

== History ==
=== Background ===
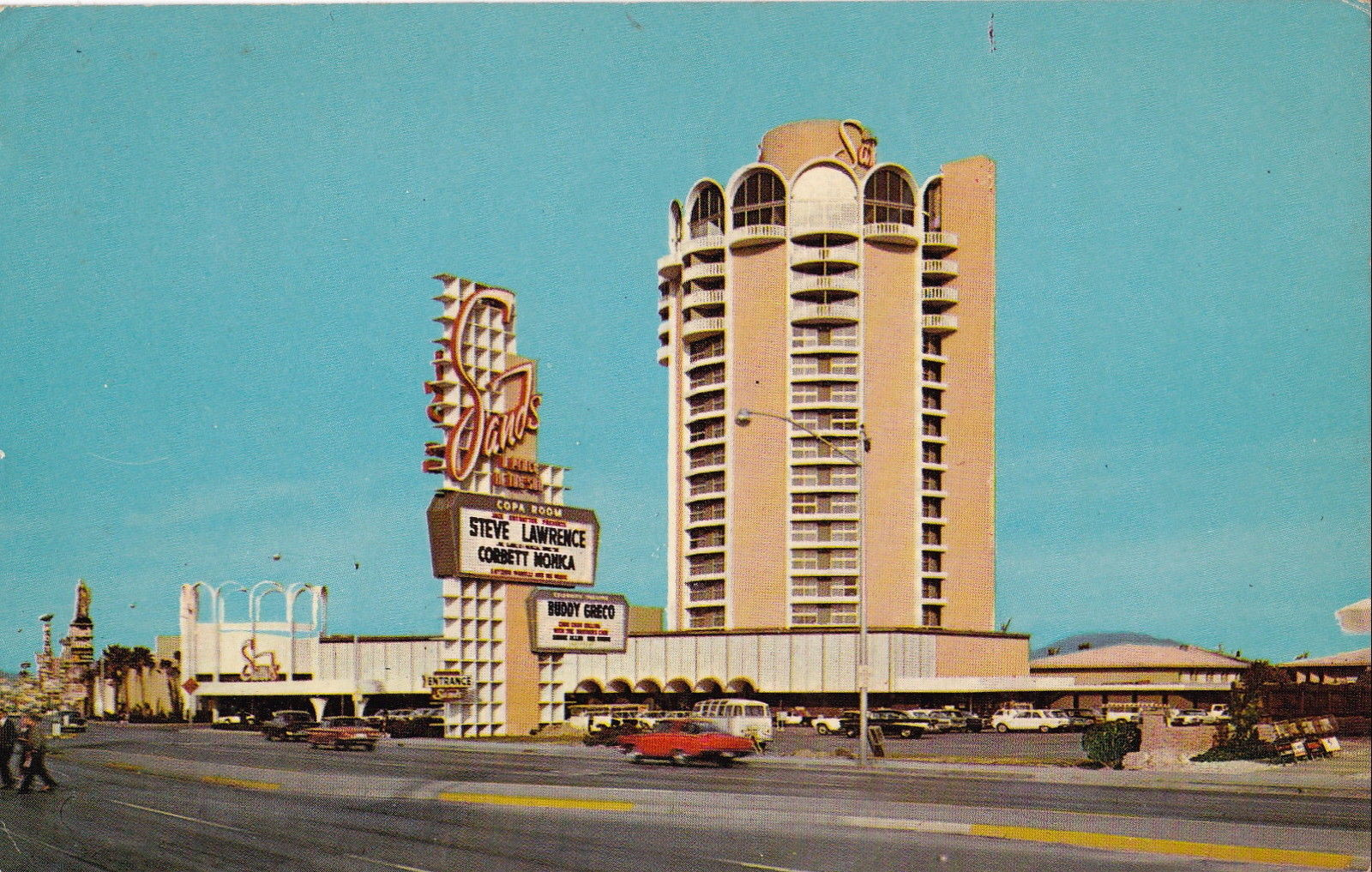
The Sands and its original neon sign, 1967

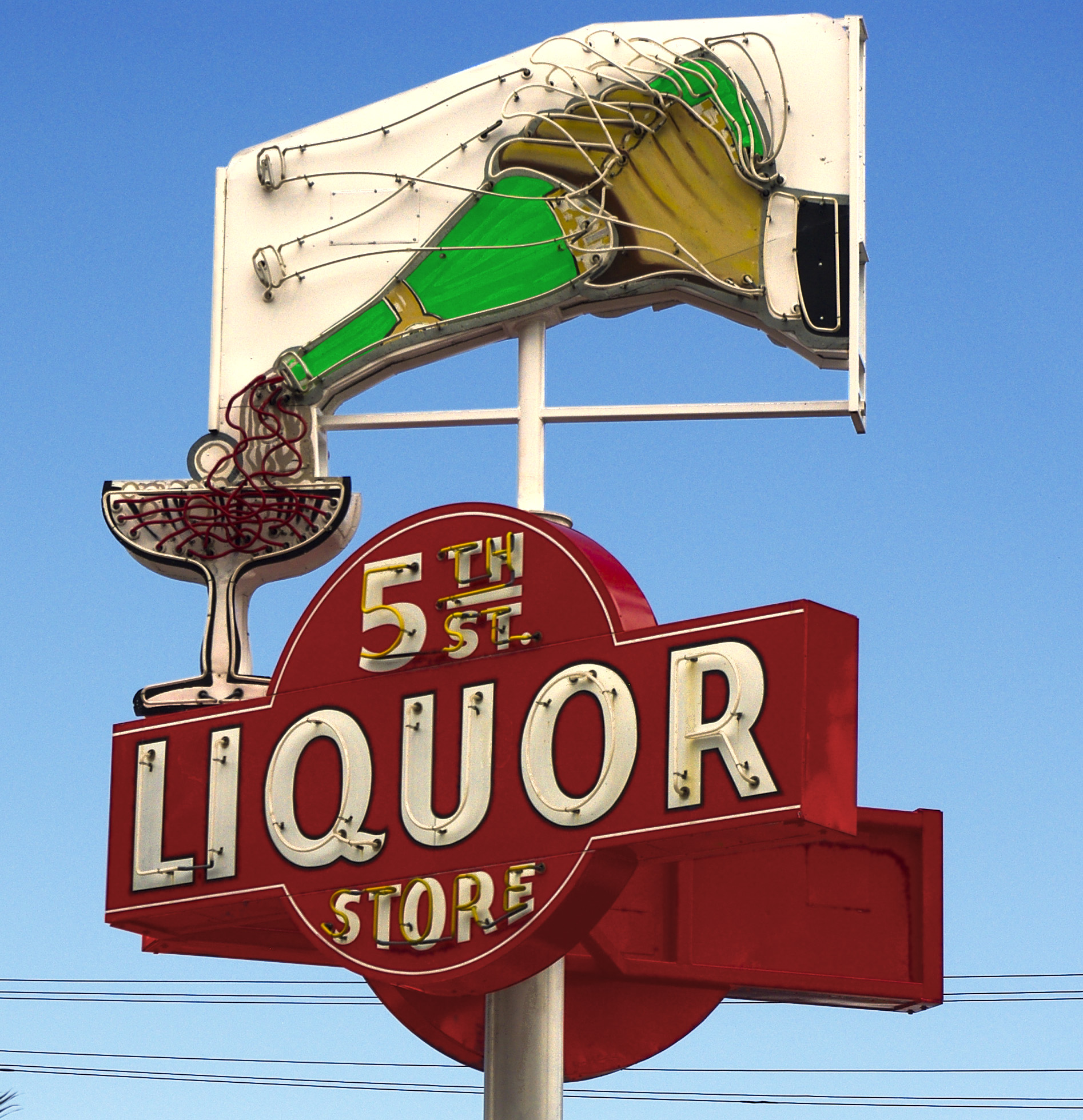
5th Street Liquor sign, the first to be donated as part of neon preservation efforts. Now on display in downtown Las Vegas.

Neon signage in Las Vegas dates to the 1920s, and saw a significant increase in popularity, especially among hotel-casinos, during the 1930s. Many signs were manufactured by Young Electric Sign Company (YESCO). In the 1970s, some locals advocated for the preservation of the city's neon signage.

The Sands Hotel and Casino, located on the Las Vegas Strip, demolished its original neon sign in 1981, as part of a renovation. Calls for neon preservation became more prominent after the sign's removal. The locally based Allied Arts Council had been contacted by a Sands employee about saving the sign, but it lacked the necessary equipment and storage space to do so.

In 1989, Allied Arts and its director, Patrick Gaffey, were working to establish a museum known then as the Neon Park, with 5th Street Liquor Store donating the first neon sign to the project. The sign, added in the late 1940s, had become well known among locals; it depicts a hand pouring a bottle of alcohol into a glass.

Allied Arts set a site for the museum along North Las Vegas Boulevard, near Cashman Field. By 1991, the group had begun storing old signs for the future museum. Some were stored in the Nevada desert, and others were kept at YESCO's Las Vegas facility.

In 1994, as Allied Arts struggled to obtain financing, the Southern Nevada Cultural Arts Foundation announced its own neon museum proposal. It would be built at the intersection of Sunset Road and Eastern Avenue, with an opening expected in mid-1995. However, this project also stalled. In 1995, Gaffey said about the Allied Arts project, "Our problem was we never had the manpower to devote to really getting it off the ground."

Las Vegas mayor Jan Jones was supportive of a neon museum. In 1995, she recruited city employee Barbara Molasky to help make it a reality. According to Molasky in 2001, "The idea for a neon museum has been around for 20 or 30 years, and just for all kinds of logistics was never able to come together."

=== Formation and early years ===
On September 18, 1996, the Las Vegas City Council approved the use of $150,000 in redevelopment funds toward the establishment of the Neon Museum. Despite the name, the project lacked a physical facility, which was deemed too costly at the time. Instead, the Neon Museum would focus initially on the re-installation of old neon signs along North Las Vegas Boulevard, helping to attract more visitors to downtown Las Vegas and the new Fremont Street Experience.

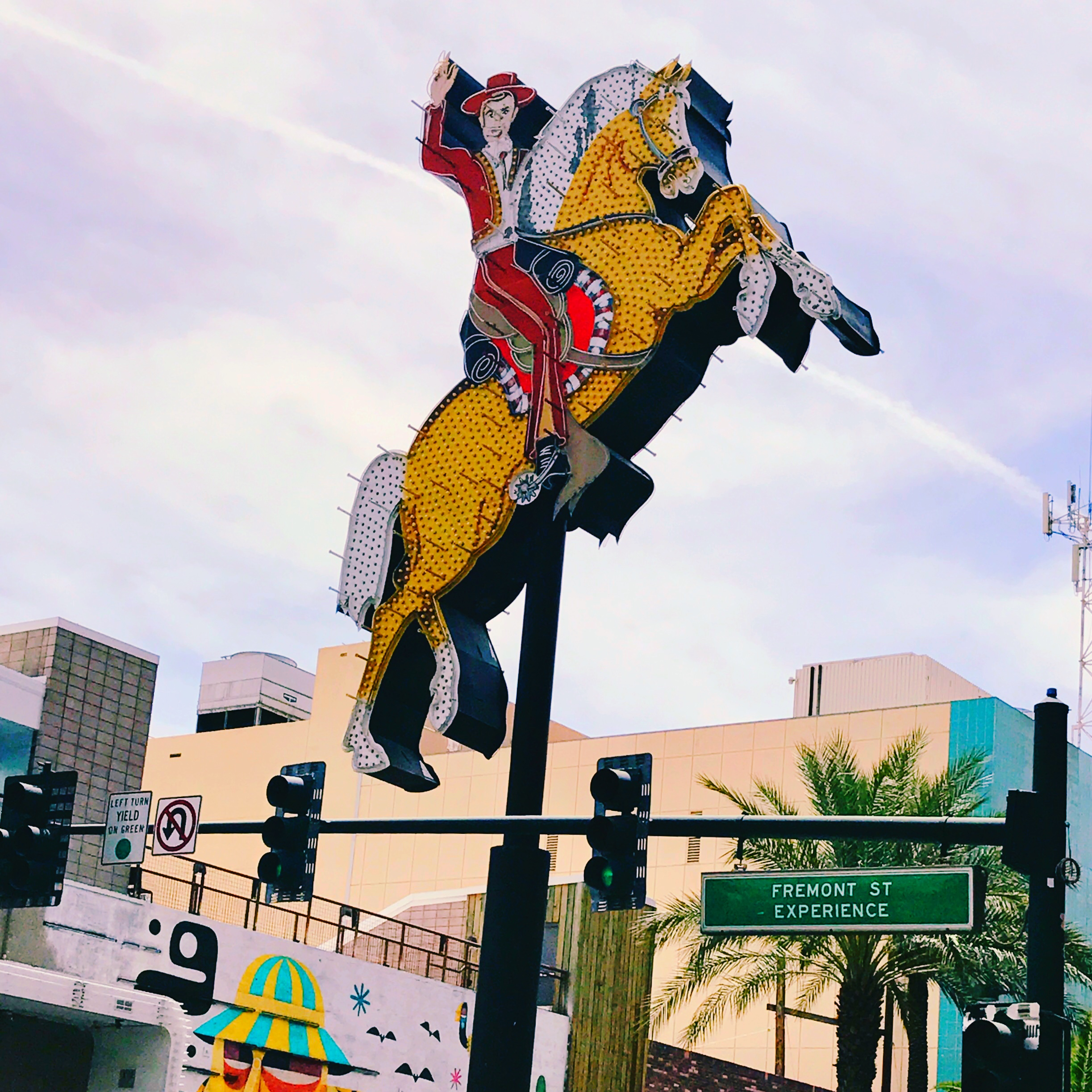
The Hacienda's relocated Horse & Rider, marking the east entrance to the Fremont Street Experience.

The Hacienda resort on the Las Vegas Strip had previously featured a popular neon sign depicting a cowboy on a horse, commonly known as the Horse & Rider sign. It sat in storage for years, and was refurbished by the Neon Museum at a cost of $60,000. It was re-installed and lit up on November 13, 1996, in a new location at the intersection of North Las Vegas Boulevard and Fremont Street. It marked the first project for the Neon Museum, which would be incorporated by the city as a nonprofit organization in 1997. Molasky is the founding president of the Neon Museum. In preparation for an eventual museum facility, she and the organization's 18-member volunteer board sought advice from the similar Museum of Neon Art in Los Angeles.

The city had a deal to acquire signage from YESCO's storage lot for the new museum. Some of the signs had become severely rusted because of exposure to the elements, and private donations would be responsible for restoring them. The storage lot and various signs had made film appearances in Mars Attacks! (1996) and Vegas Vacation (1997). The site later received dozens of tour requests every week that had to be turned down; YESCO lacked the time needed to give tours, and the frequent requests were one reason for the company's support of the Neon Museum.

YESCO eventually made plans to close its storage lot, allowing more room for its sign manufacturing. In 2000, the city council granted the Neon Museum a site on North Las Vegas Boulevard, near Cashman Field, to store its neon collection. The site was 0.66 acres (0.27 ha), and with adjacent land located just south, the museum later expanded to 2.27 acres (0.92 ha). The site, located north of Fremont Street, is leased to the museum for $1 a year.

YESCO continued using its storage lot into 2001, when the company began transferring signs to the Neon Museum's lot, known as the Neon Boneyard. It was open to the public by appointment only, starting later in 2001. By the following year, the site had 75 signs. As of 2003, the museum had expanded south to the adjacent land, where a second boneyard took shape. The collection grew to more than 200 signs as of 2006, with 50 coming from YESCO's storage site. The Neon Museum was popular for photo shoots but otherwise was largely unknown among the general public, averaging 1,800 tour-goers each year as of 2007.

=== La Concha project and public opening ===
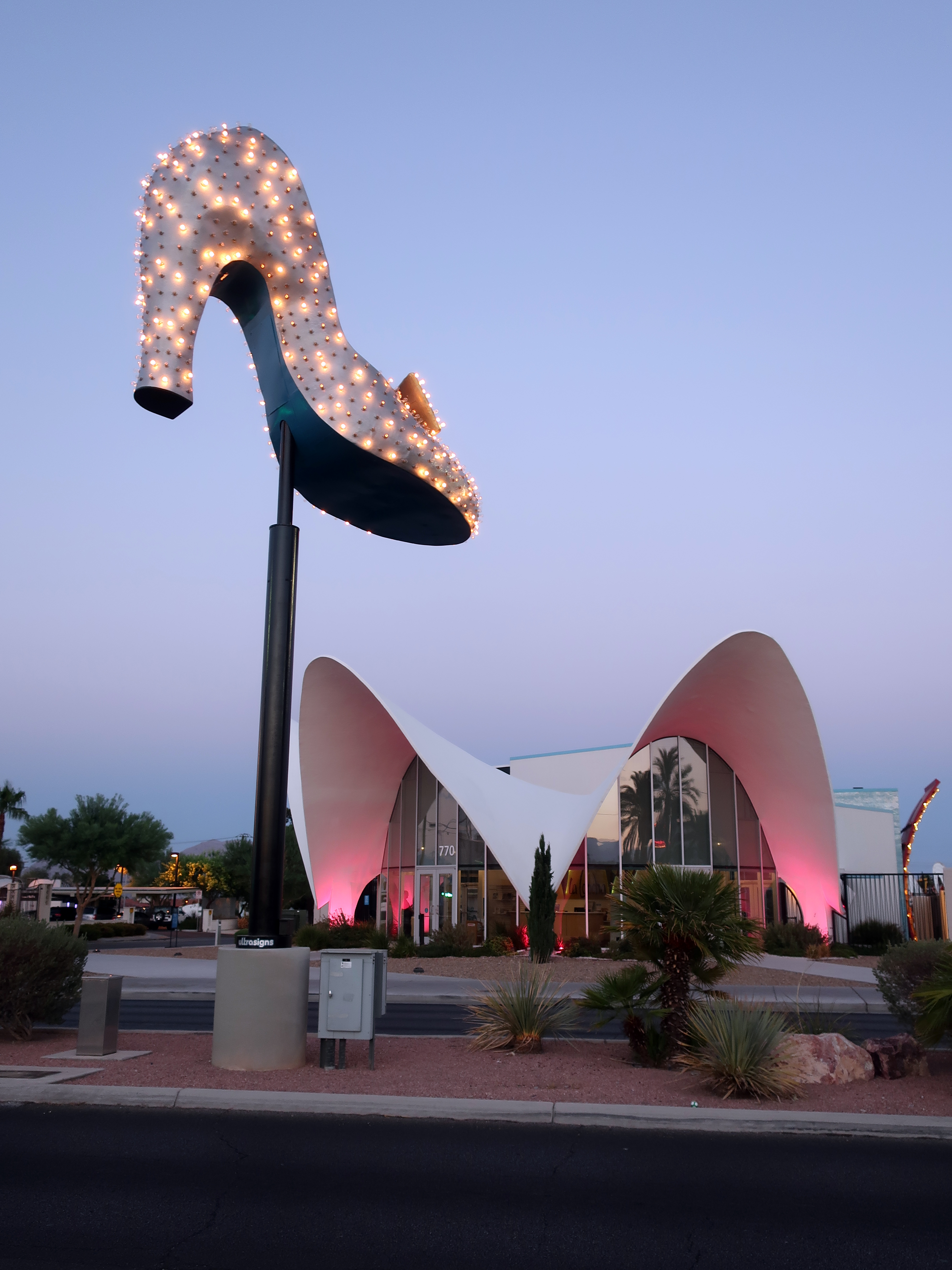
The relocated La Concha lobby and the neon Silver Slipper in 2018

The Doumani family, owners of the La Concha Motel on the Strip, donated its unique shell-shaped lobby to the museum in 2005, while the rest of the motel was demolished for redevelopment. The museum intended to use the lobby as a visitor center. Although it cost nearly $3 million to move and restore the lobby, the plans to open a museum became concrete after the donation of the building, drawing a number of public and private grants and donations. In 2006, the lobby was cut into eight pieces and moved 3.5 miles (5.6 km) north along Las Vegas Boulevard to the museum site.

In 2010, the Neon Museum built a small park with desert landscaping, benches, and kiosks providing information about the history of neon. Known as the Neon Boneyard Park, it is located on the property's northwest corner. The half-acre project cost $1.9 million, which included paving a portion of the land for a museum parking lot.

On May 12, 2011, work began to convert the relocated La Concha lobby into a visitor center. Following its completion, the Neon Museum officially opened to the general public on October 27, 2012, eliminating the old appointment-only system. Prior to the opening, the museum had averaged 1,000 monthly visitors by appointment. The years-long effort to open the museum was estimated to have cost $6 million. It employed 29 people and had another 30 volunteers.

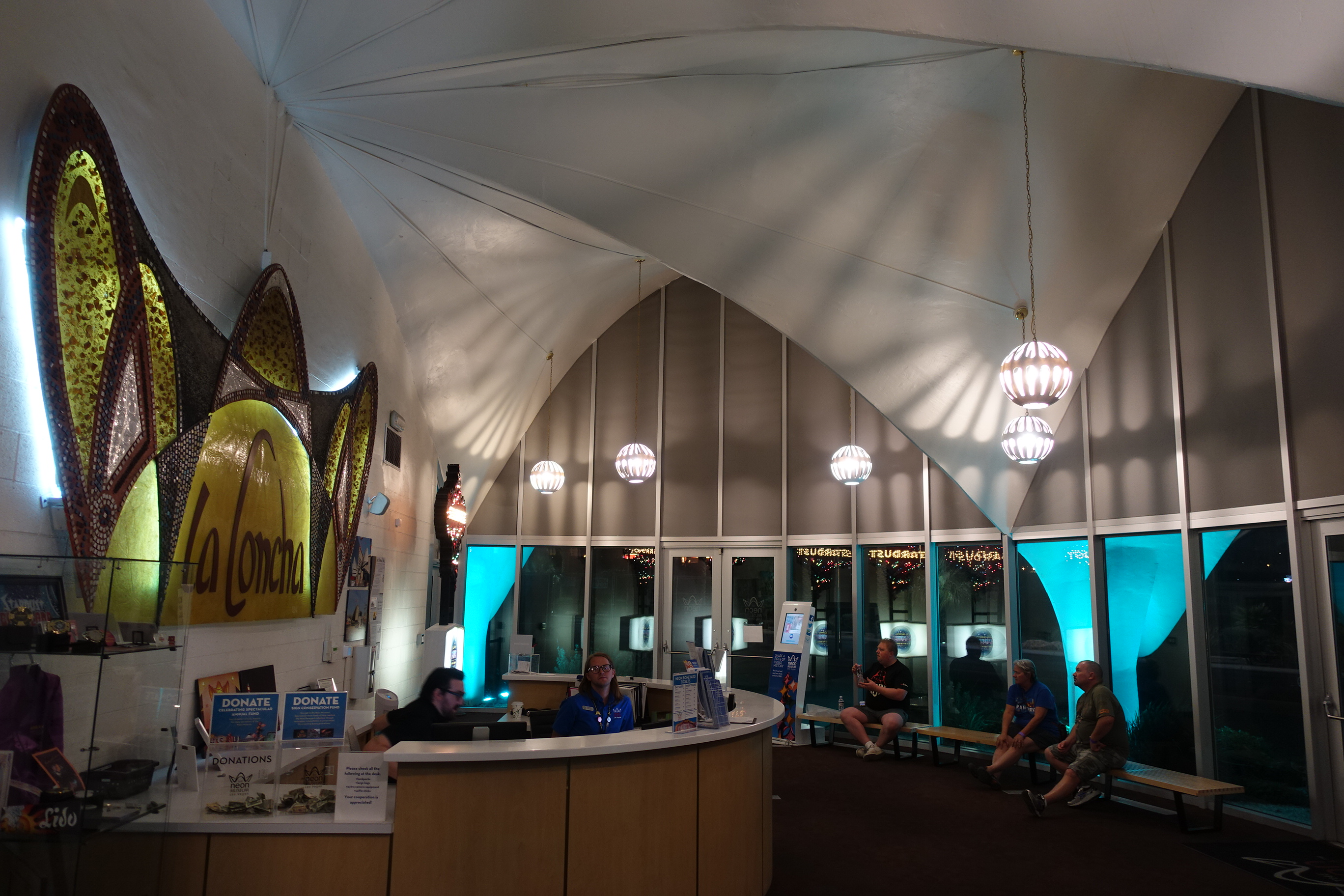
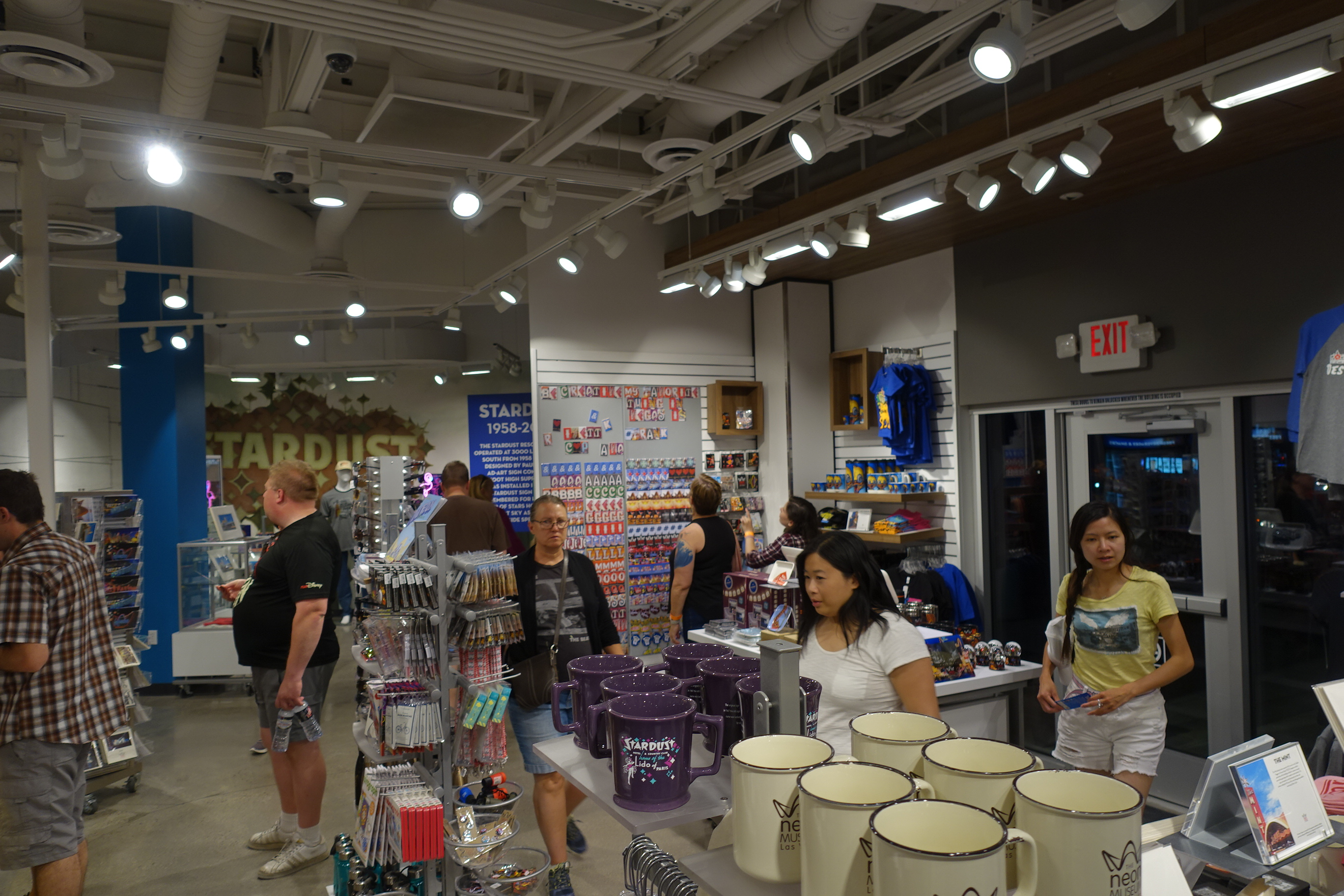
Interior of the repurposed La Concha lobby and gift shop

Las Vegas mayor Carolyn Goodman was hopeful that the Neon Museum would help attract more visitors to downtown. The museum received 60,461 visitors during 2013, on par with projections. Approximately 80 percent of the visitors were non-residents. In 2016, the museum's staff outgrew the office space in the La Concha structure and relocated to the former Las Vegas City Hall building. The prior office space was removed to create a larger gift shop for the museum.

=== Expansion ===
Hundreds of the museum's neon artifacts are kept in off-site storage facilities due to space limitations. In 2017, the museum received a $425,000 grant from the city to help finance an expansion of its main boneyard, allowing for more signs to go on display. The project required the purchase and demolition of the vacant L.A. Street Market, located directly south of the La Concha visitor center.

With only about 30 percent of its collection on display, the Neon Museum sought to expand further. In 2019, the city agreed to lease a shuttered cultural center nearby for an indoor neon gallery, while the parking lot would become a third boneyard for signs. The structure was in need of costly repairs, but planning and fundraising were delayed as a result of the COVID-19 pandemic, prompting the Neon Museum to pull out of the deal in 2022.

As of 2023, the museum received 200,000 visitors annually, with 30,000 turned away that year as a result of sold-out tours. The museum announced in 2024 that it would eventually move to two larger, nearby locations within 18b The Las Vegas Arts District. Plans to relocate there were dropped the following year, when the museum began considering three other downtown sites.

== Museum overview ==
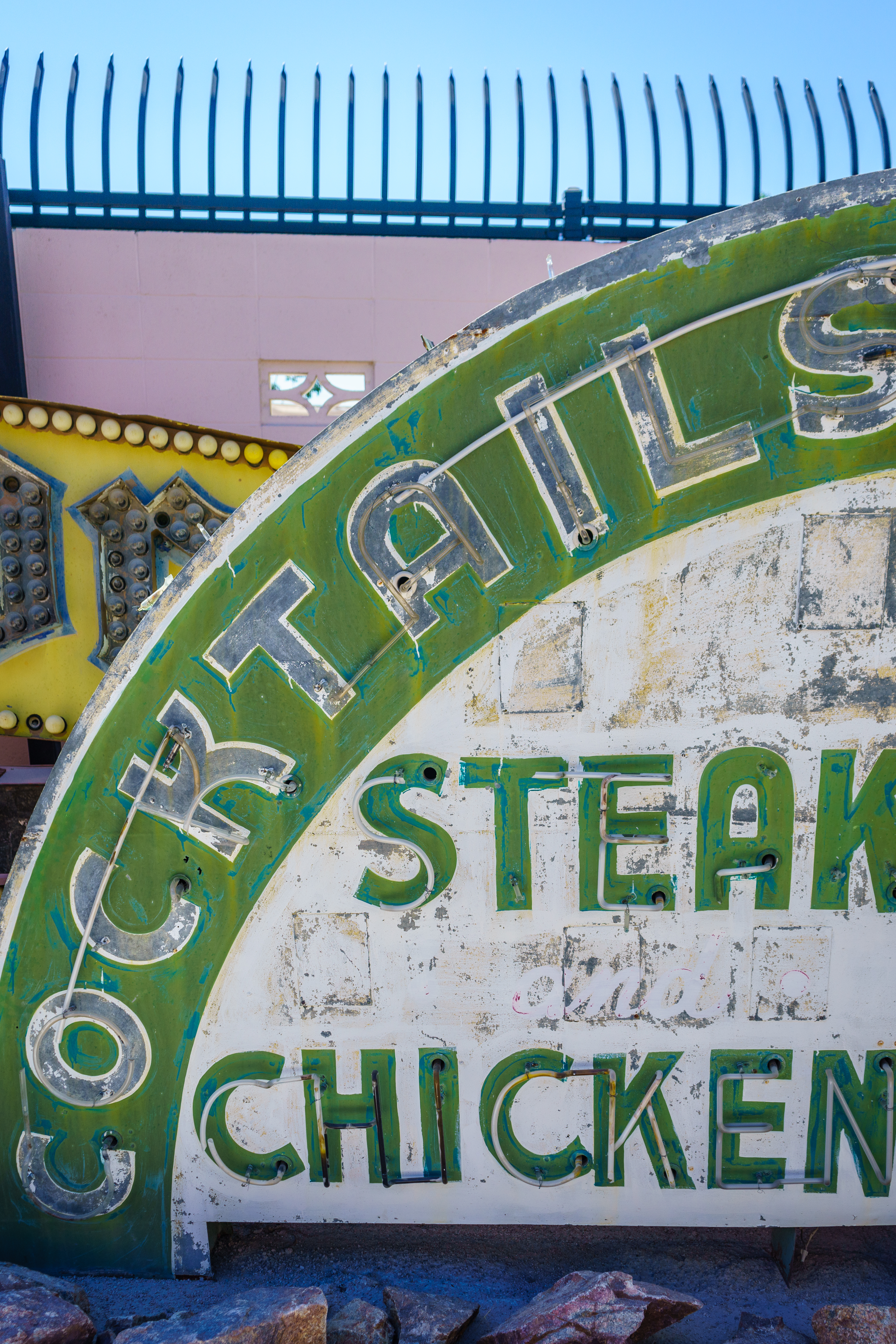
The museum's oldest piece is this remnant from a 1930s sign for the Green Shack restaurant.

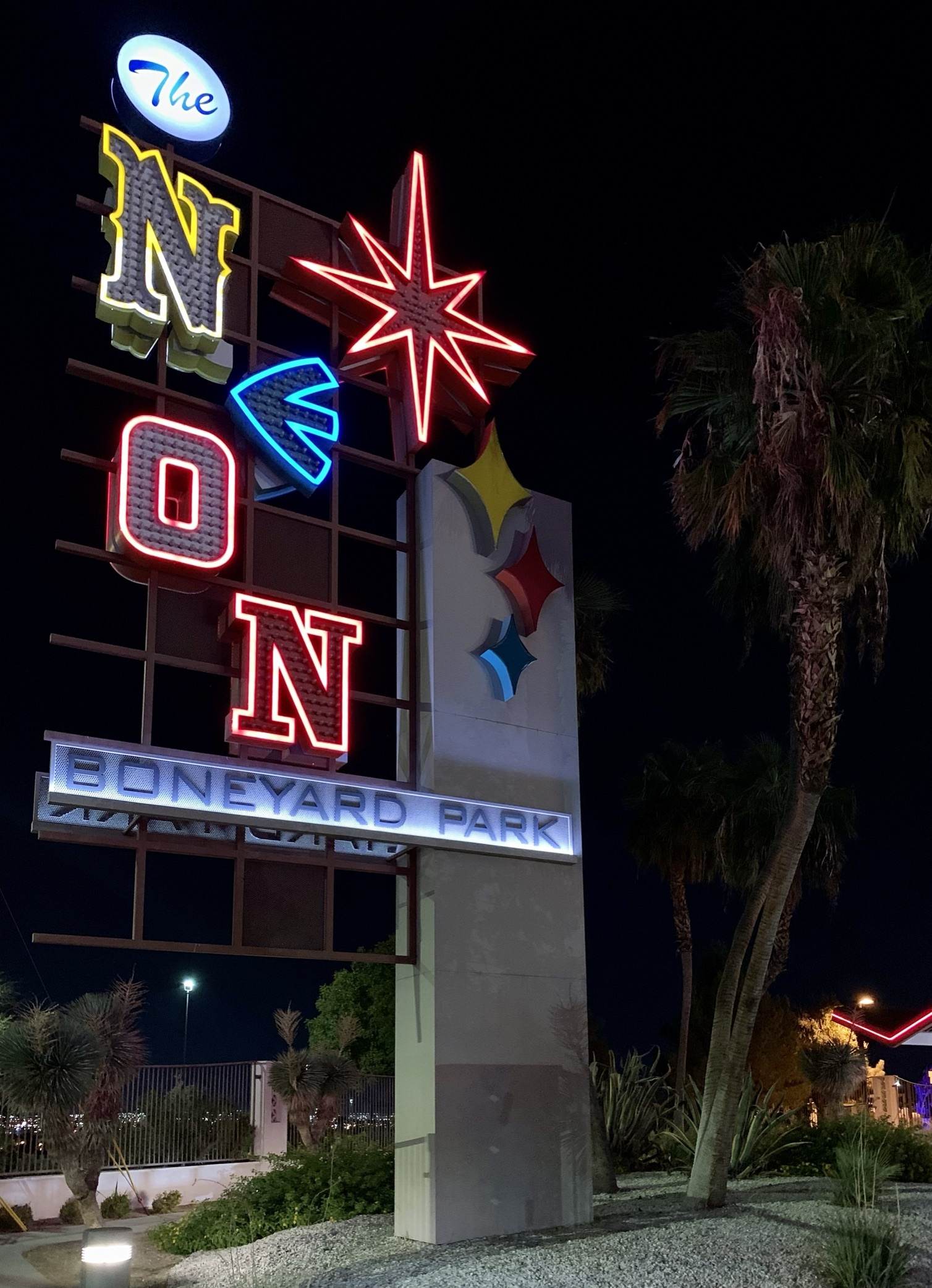
Neon Boneyard Park sign created by Federal Heath. "NEON" is spelled using letters shaped like those on signs for the Golden Nugget ("N"), Caesars Palace ("E"), Binion's Horseshoe ("O"), and the Desert Inn ("N").

The Neon Museum is located at 770 North Las Vegas Boulevard, where it occupies a 2.27-acre (0.92 ha) site. The museum includes the main Neon Boneyard and the original, smaller North Gallery boneyard. The museum offers guided and self-guided tours. Stories are associated with each sign and are told to visitors.

Many of the museum's signs come from hotel-casinos throughout the Las Vegas Valley, particularly those that are no longer in operation. Signage from hotel-casinos include the Stardust, the Riviera, the Flamingo, the Tropicana, the Moulin Rouge, El Cortez, New York-New York, the Plaza, the Debbie Reynolds Hotel, and the Nevada Palace. Resort signs are manufactured by YESCO, which leases them out; signs that are no longer needed are returned to YESCO and then provided to the museum for preservation.

In addition to hotel and casino signage, the collection also includes those from other businesses in the local community, such as a Hard Rock Cafe, the Peppermill restaurant, and Ugly Duckling Car Sales. The museum also houses fiberglass sculptures, including a giant skull from the Treasure Island Hotel and Casino.

Rob McCoy, the Neon Museum's then-president and CEO, said in 2016, "When we first began, we would have to call and ask for someone to donate a sign. We no longer have to do that. When a building is ready to get shut down or be imploded, we're one of the first calls they make. They want us to have the signs." The Barbara Molasky Acquisition Fund was established in 2021, to purchase signs that are not being donated by the owners.

As of 2023, the collection includes approximately 250 signs on display, dating to the 1930s. The oldest piece in the collection is a sign remnant from the Green Shack restaurant. Aside from vintage signs, the museum also has more-recent pieces. Private donors are sought to fund restoration of the signs, the cost of which can range from $10,000 to $100,000, and can take three to six months. Due to the cost, many signs in the boneyard are unrestored and do not light up on their own during night tours, instead illuminated by external lighting. Some signs are considered of high priority for restoration, typically due to their historic status or because they are in a state of rapid deterioration.

As of 2023, the museum hosted 200 weddings each year.

=== Scenic Byway project ===
In 2009, a portion of Las Vegas Boulevard was named a National Scenic Byway. In conjunction with this, the museum added several vintage neon signs along the street, including one from the downtown casino Binion's Horseshoe. A neon slipper, from the demolished Silver Slipper casino on the Strip, was added to the median in front of the museum. The newly placed signs joined others already installed along Las Vegas Boulevard, including the Hacienda's Horse & Rider.

=== Shows and mural ===
In 2018, the museum debuted a 30-minute show by artist Craig Winslow titled Brilliant!. It uses projection mapping to reanimate the unlit signs in the North Gallery, set to vintage and contemporary music. The show was upgraded in 2021 with a name change to Brilliant! Jackpot, reflecting the randomization of the show being presented. That year, artists Nanda Sharif-pour and Ali Fathollahi created a mural for the museum, titled Las Vegas Luminaries. It is located in the North Gallery, marking the entrance to Brilliant!. The mural features 11 people who played a role in the city's artistic history, including entertainers Liberace and Sammy Davis Jr., as well as sign designer Betty Willis.

Lost Vegas: Tim Burton, an exhibit by film director Tim Burton, ran at the Neon Museum from October 2019 to February 2020. It featured more than 40 art pieces by Burton.

== Gallery ==
The following images are from the museum's two boneyards, unless stated otherwise.

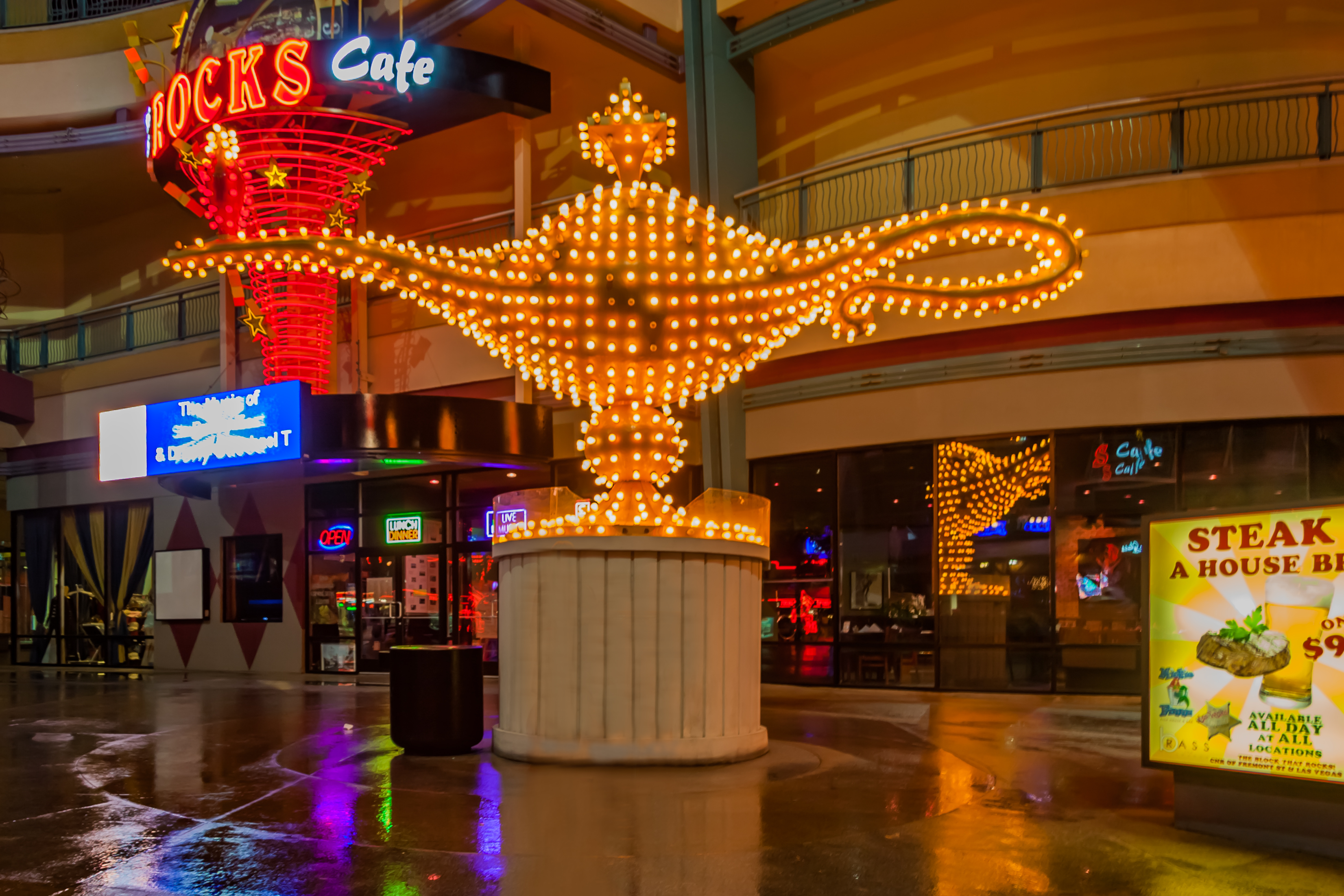
Neon genie lamp from the original Aladdin resort, seen on the grounds of the Neonopolis mall in 2012

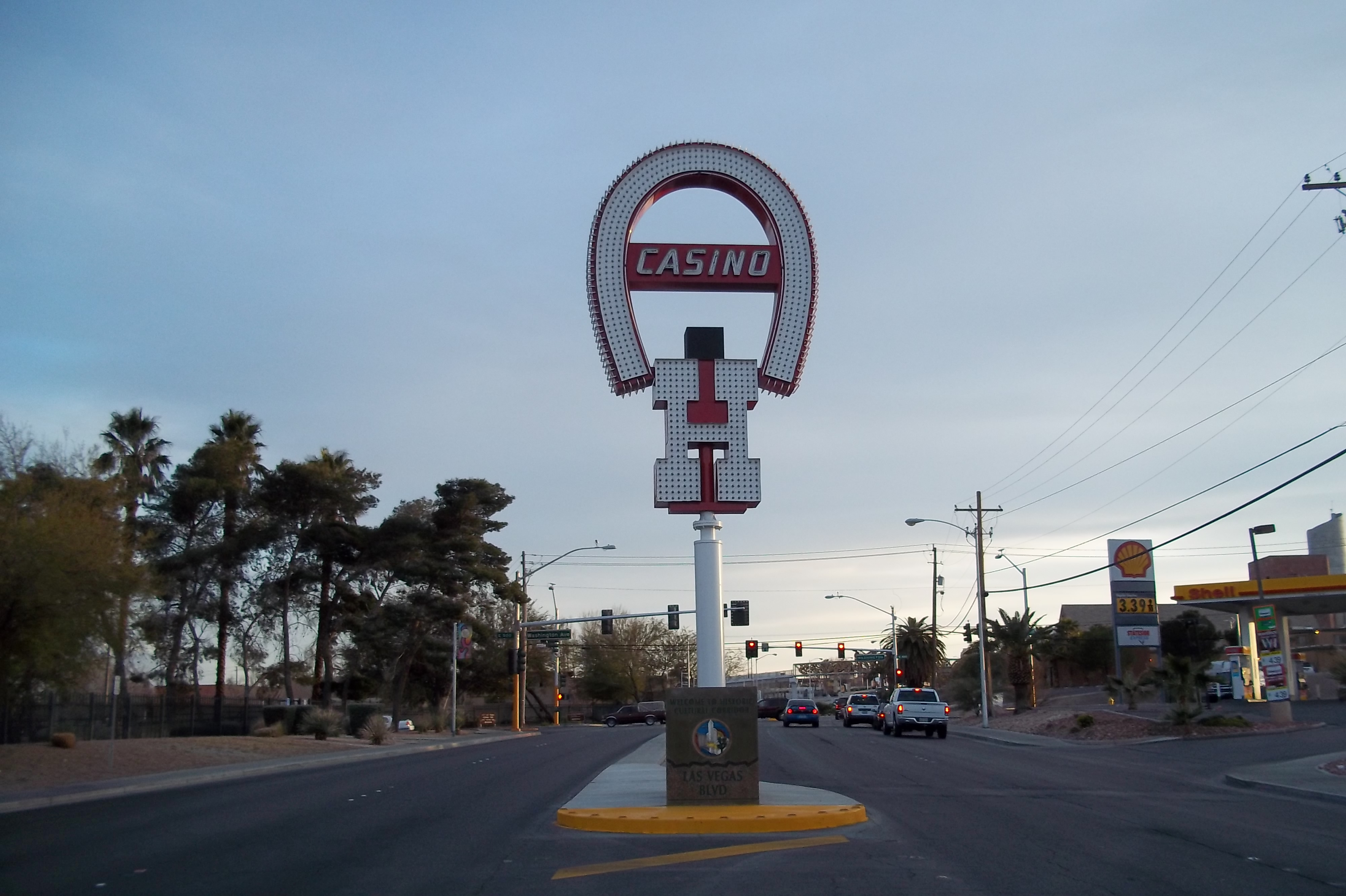
Sign from Binion's Horseshoe, marking the northern start of the Scenic Byway.

A video of Brilliant! (2019)

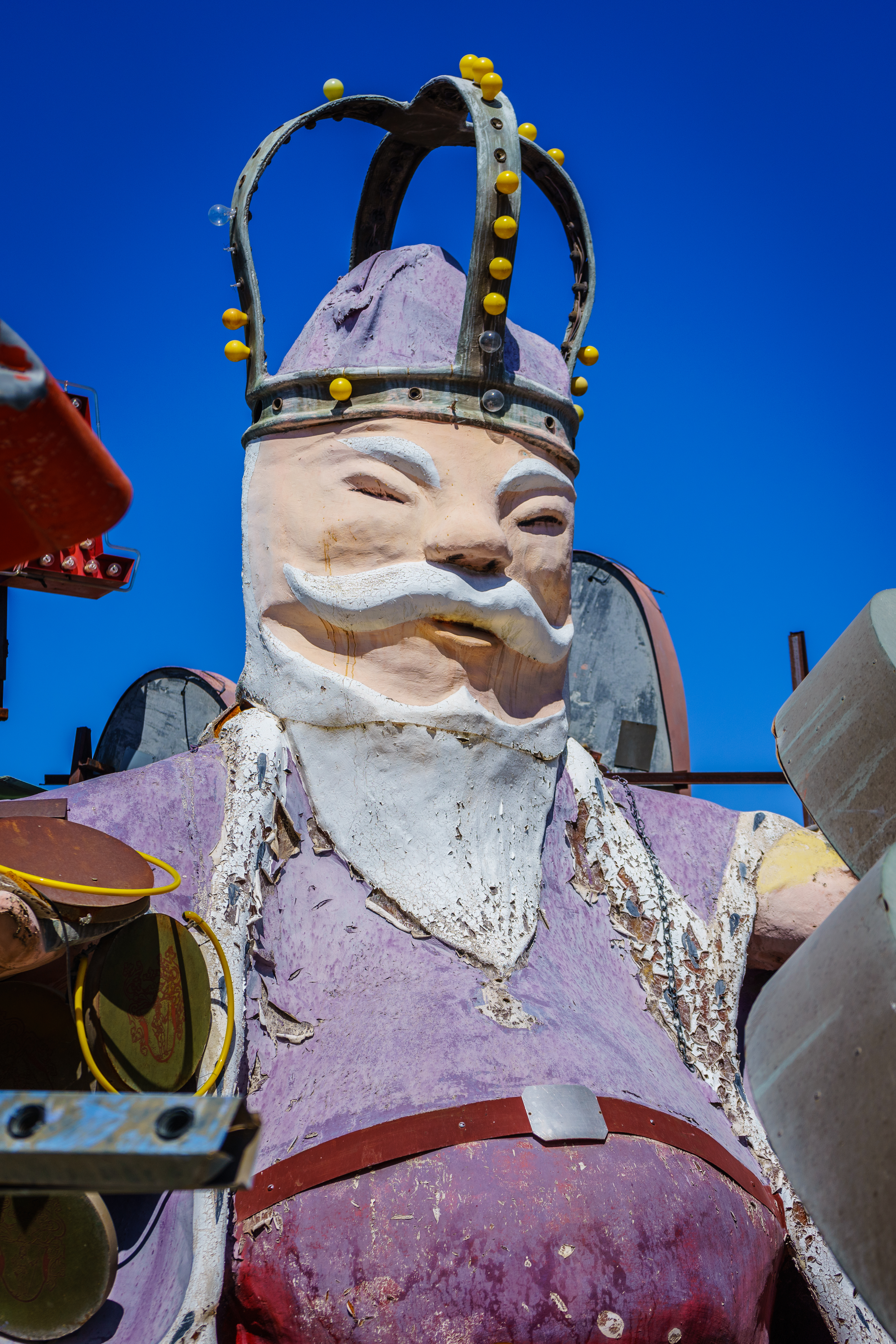
Neon king statue from the Coin Castle casino

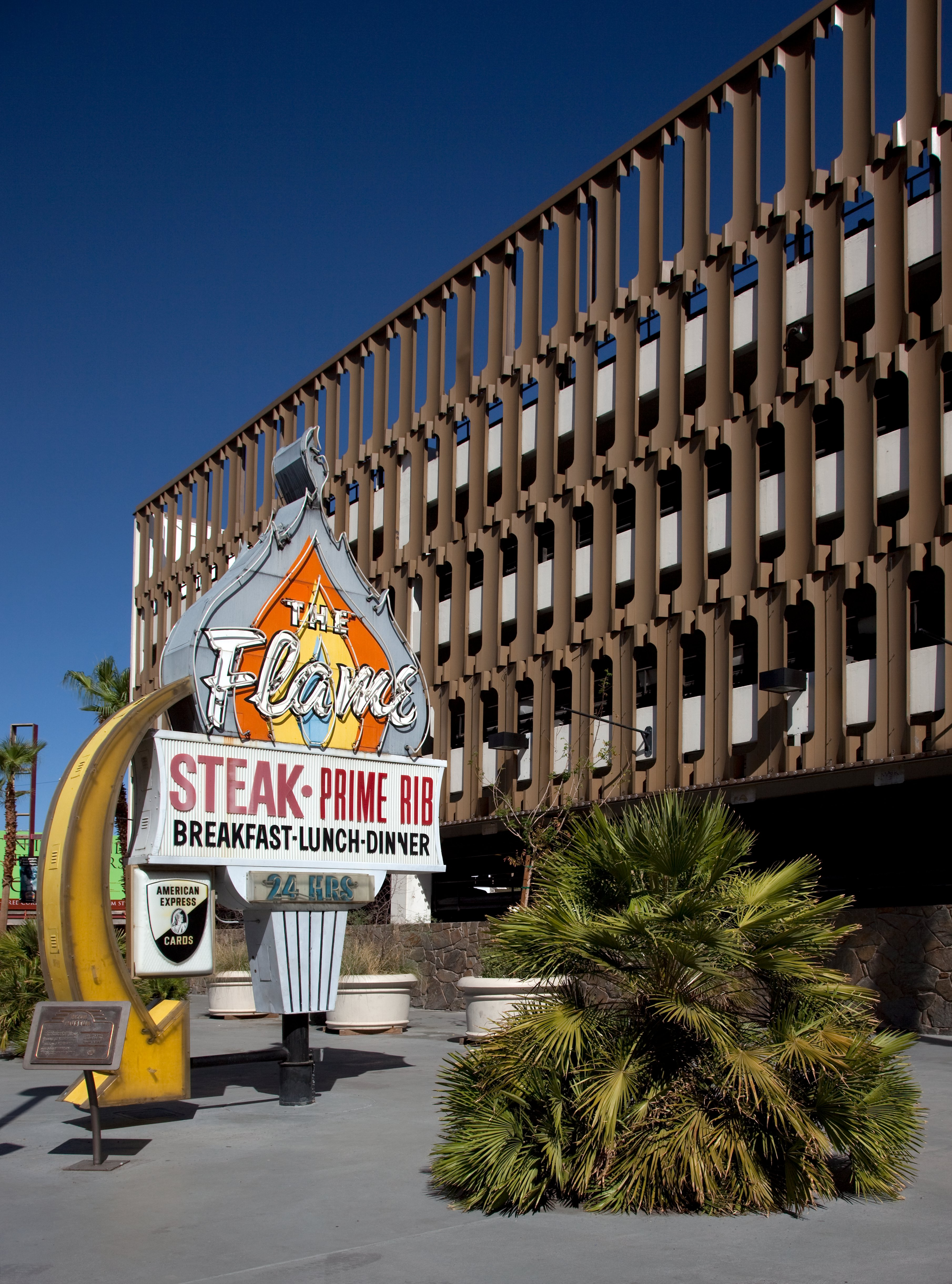
Sign for the Flame restaurant, seen outside of the Fremont Hotel and Casino in 2009

Historic Golden Nugget sign

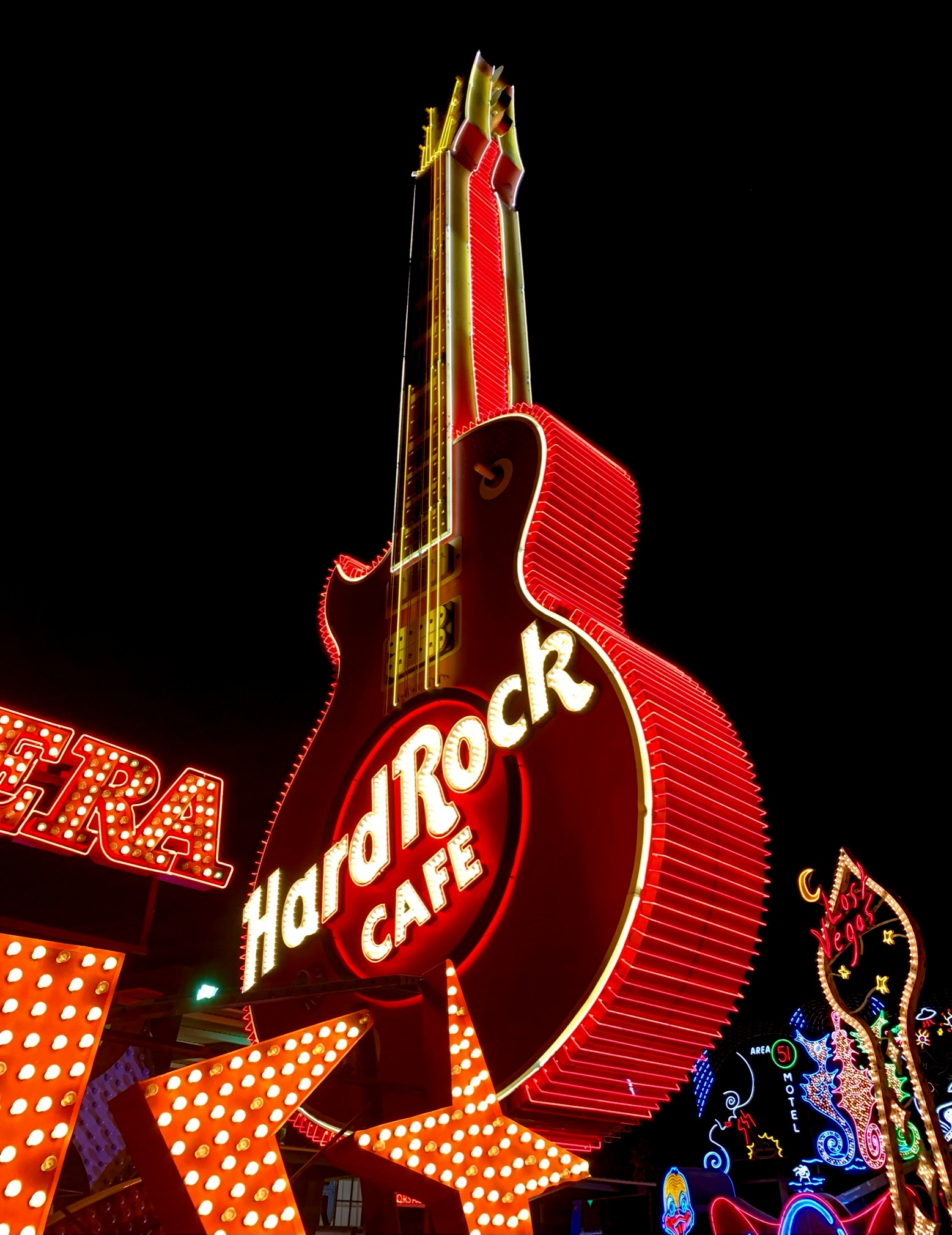
Guitar sign from a local Hard Rock Cafe

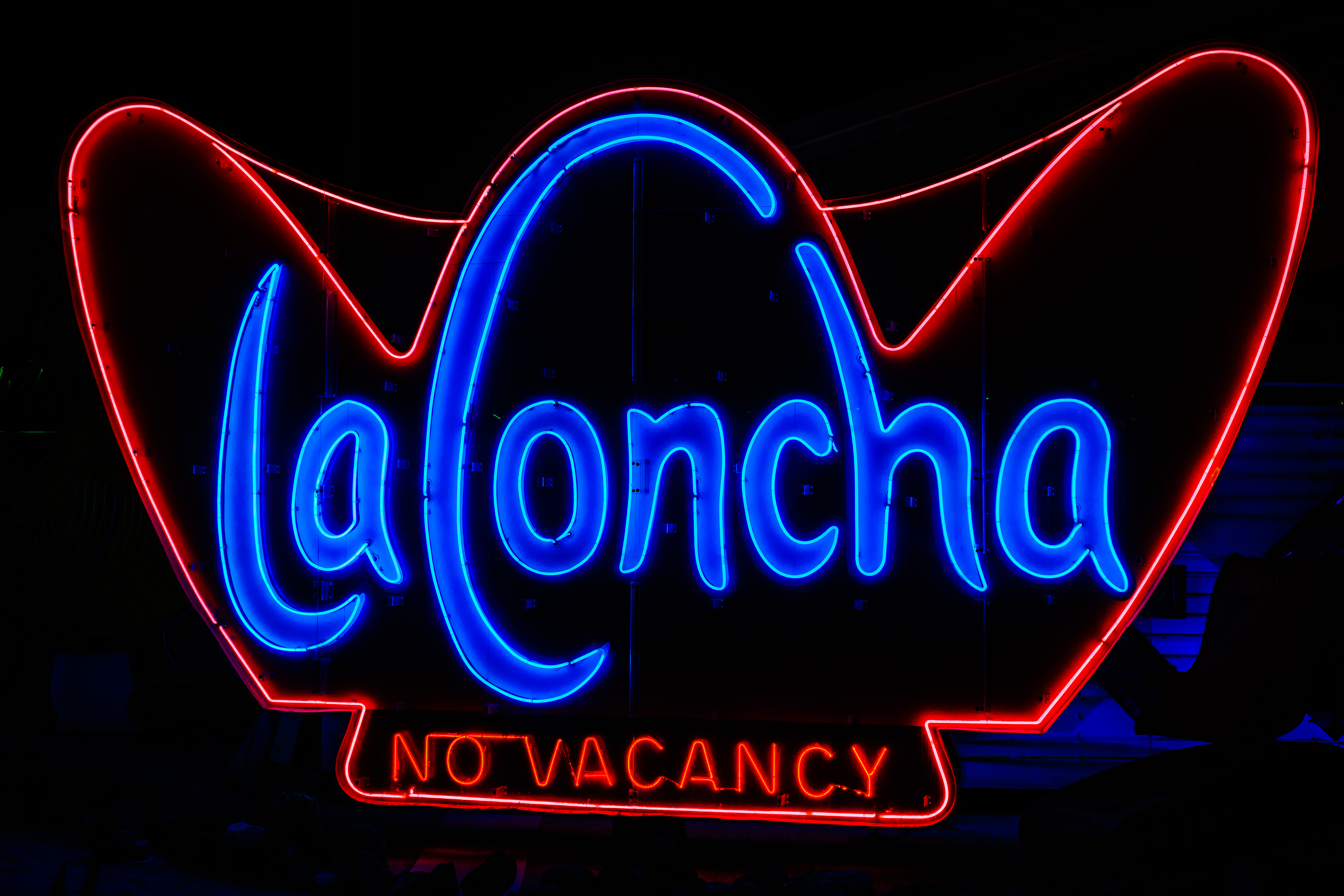
La Concha neon signage

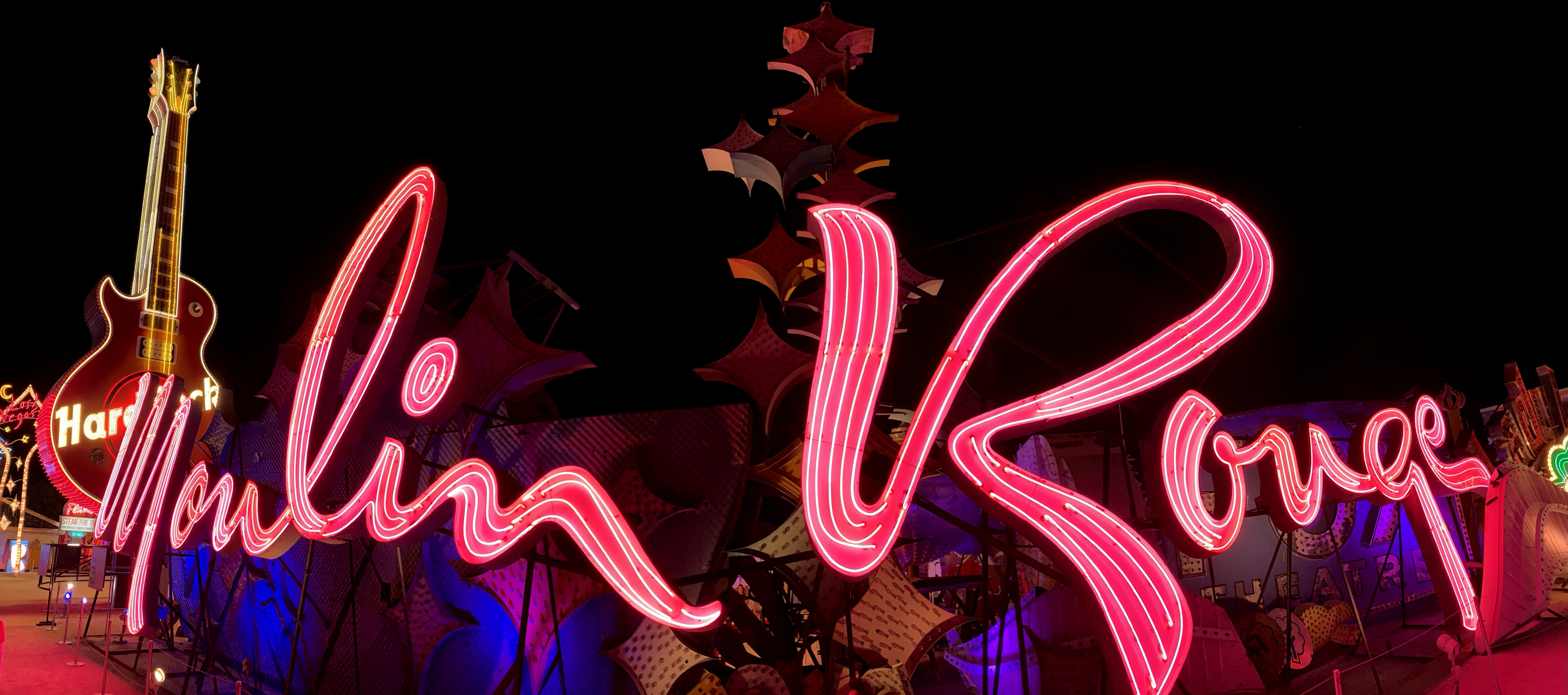
Moulin Rouge sign

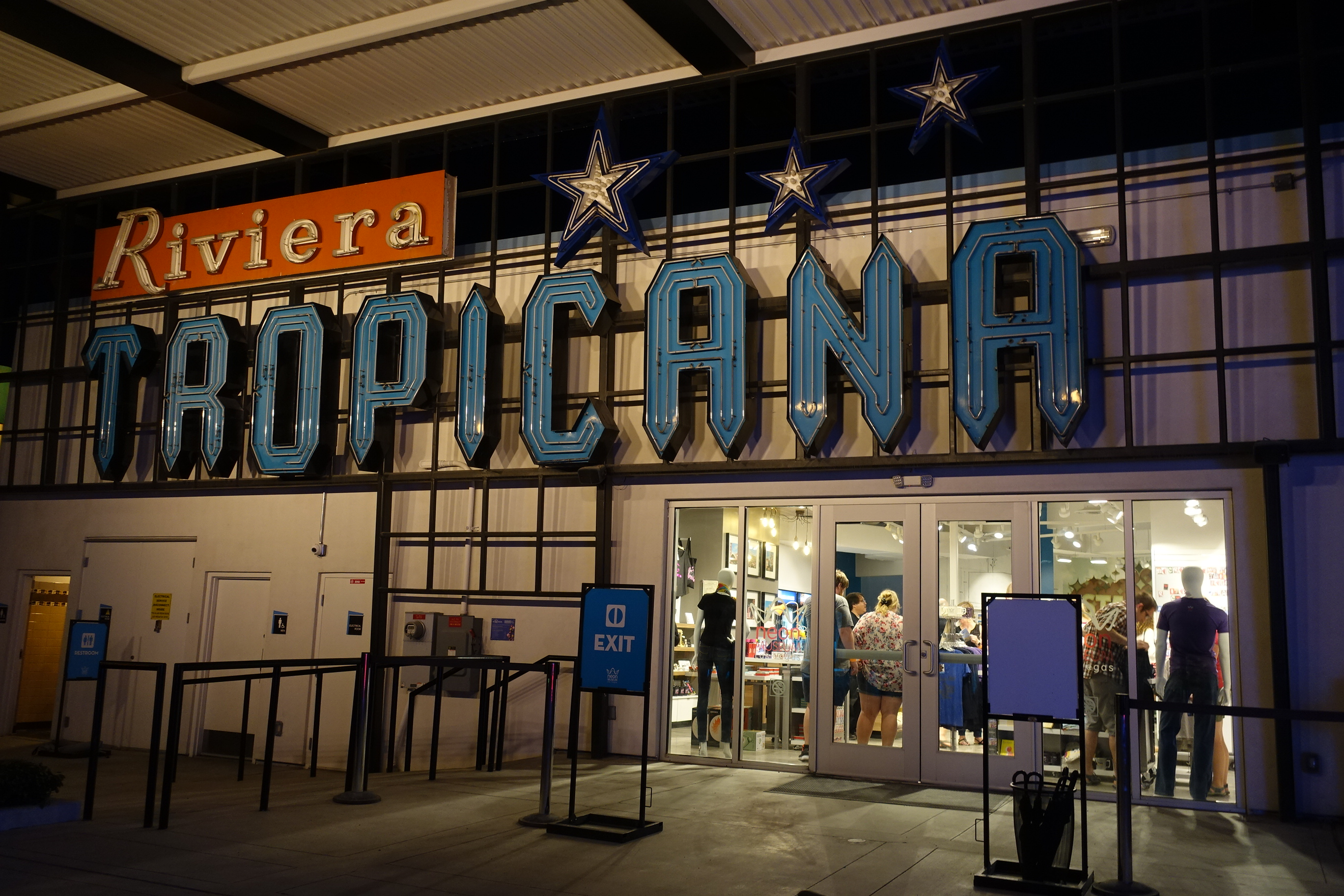
Gift shop exterior featuring signs for the Riviera and Tropicana resorts

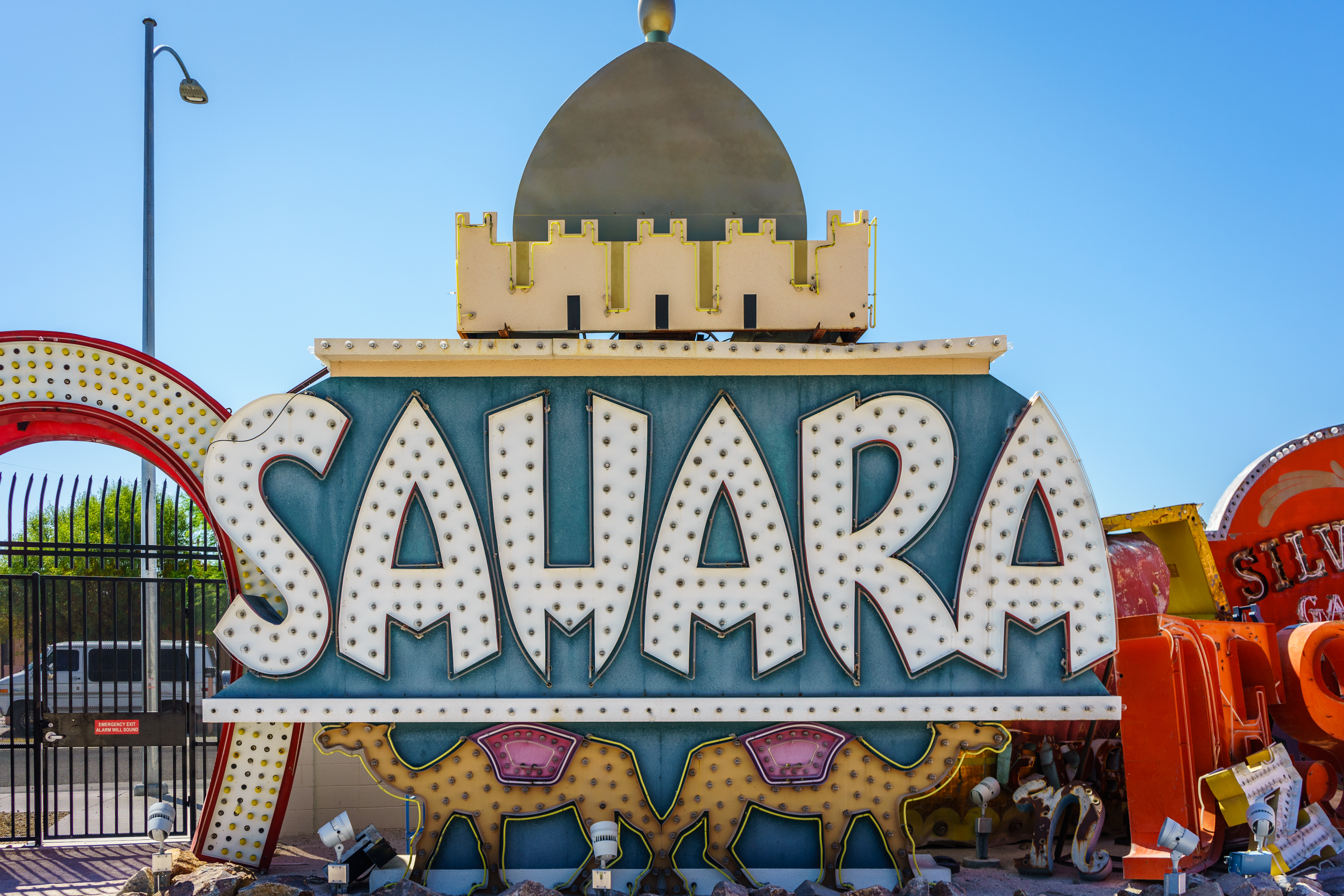
1990s sign from the Sahara resort

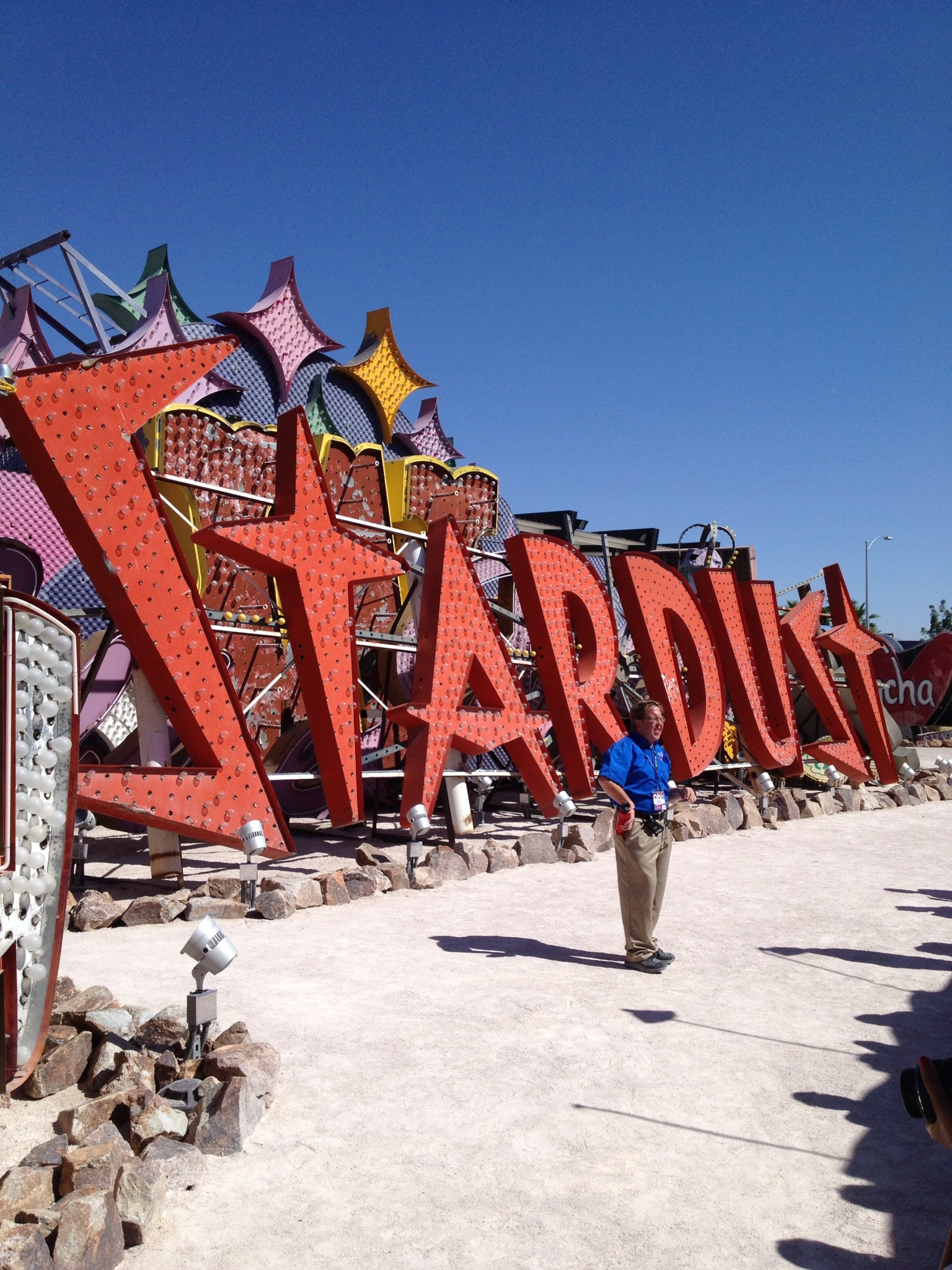
1960s sign from the Stardust resort

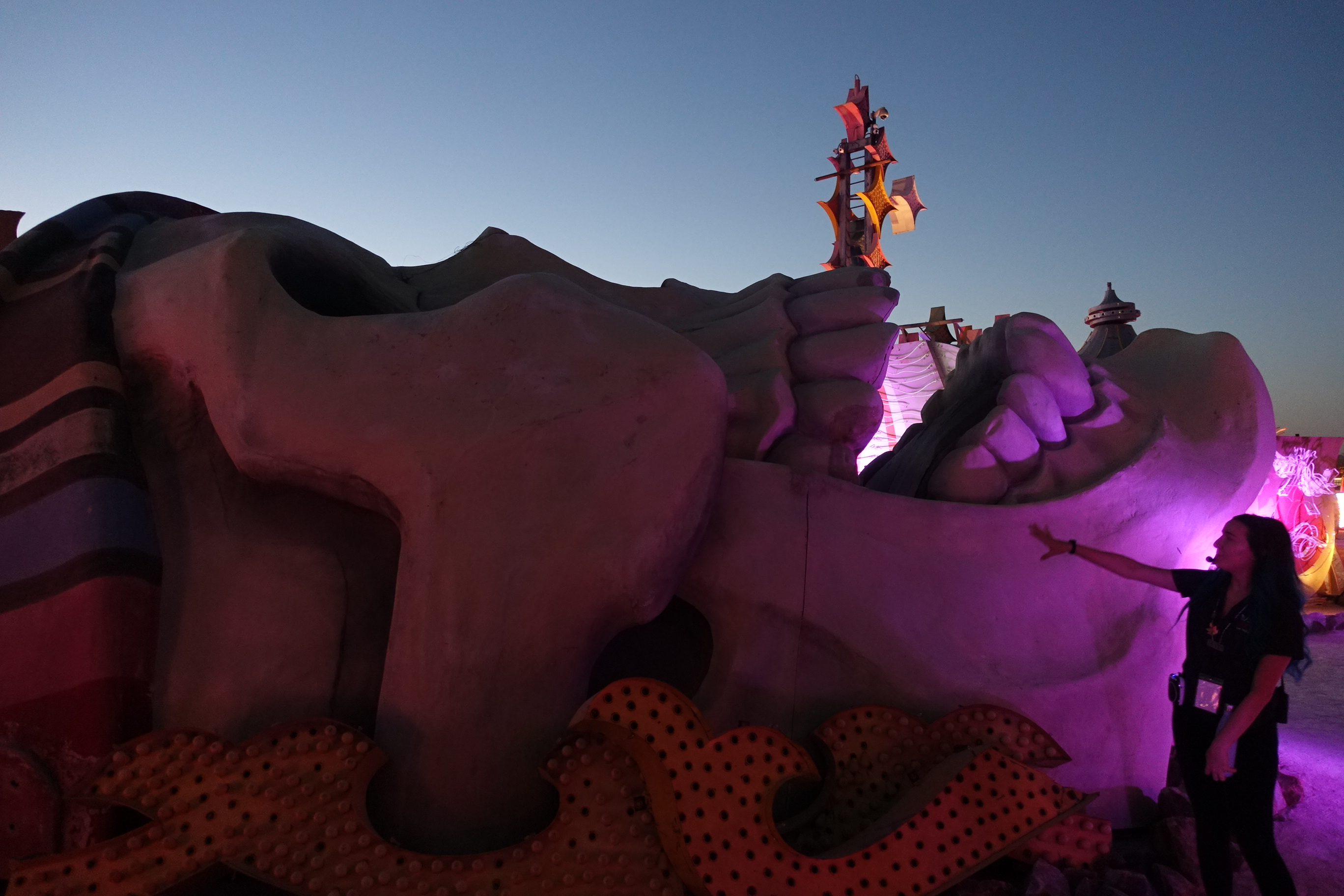
Fiberglass skull from Treasure Island

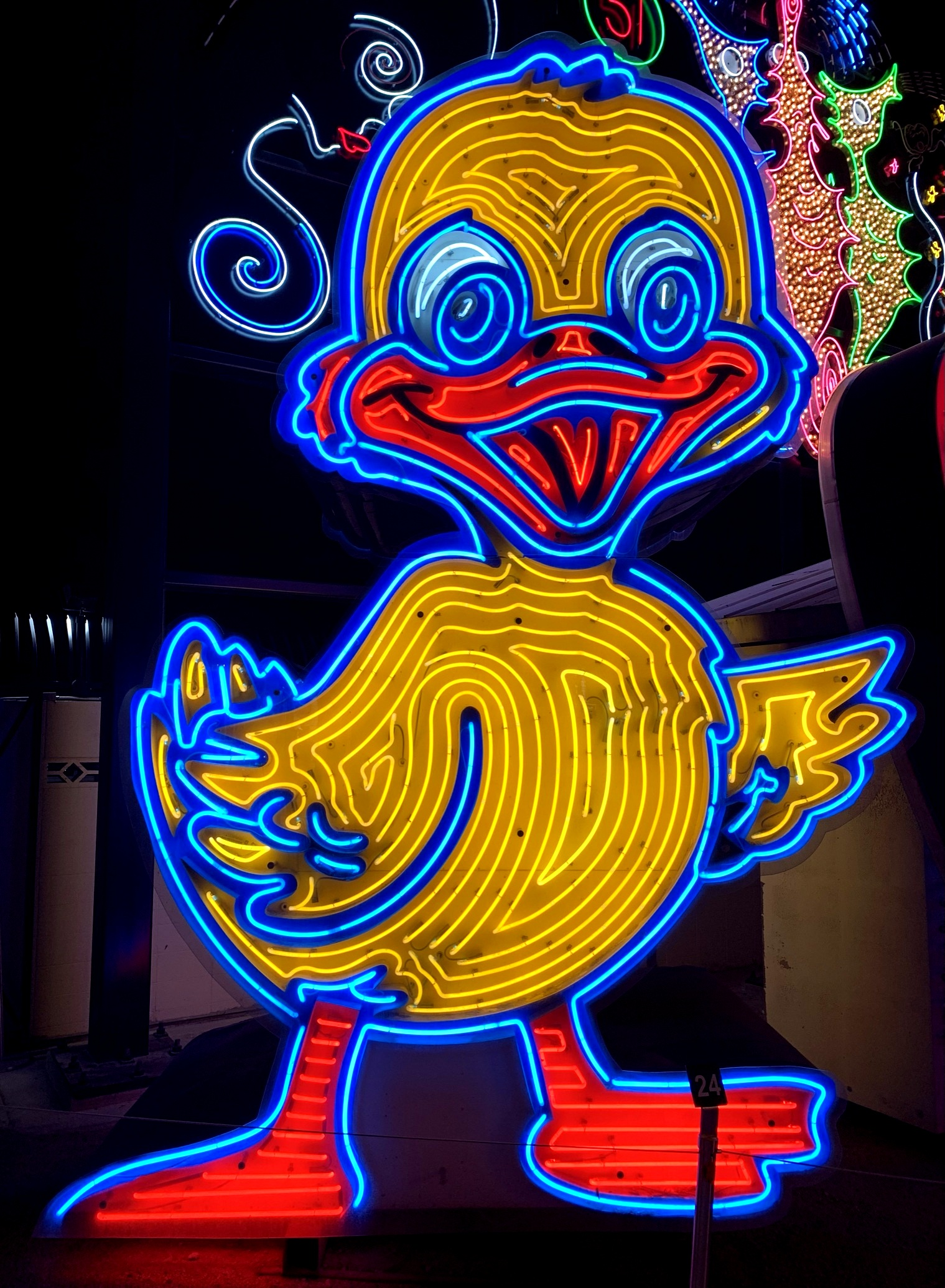
Ugly Duckling Car Sales
