= Majestic Las Vegas =

- Alternative names: Conrad Las Vegas; The Waldorf-Astoria Residences

General information
- Status: Never built
- Type: Condominiums and hotel
- Architectural style: Art Deco
- Location: Las Vegas Strip, Winchester, Nevada, United States
- Coordinates: 36.134224°N 115.161750°W
- Estimated completion: February 2006
- Owner: Majestic Resorts / Conrad Hotels

Height
- Height: 654-foot (199 m) (2006 redesign)

Technical details
- Floor count: 42 (initial design); 40 (2005 redesign)
- Grounds: 5.4 acres (2.2 ha)

Design and construction
- Architecture firm: Paul Steelman Design Group
- Developer: Majestic Resorts / Conrad Hotels

Other information
- Number of units: 144 or 378 (initial design); 560 (2005 redesign)
- Parking: 574 (initial design)

Website
- Official website

Majestic Las Vegas is a cancelled high-rise condominium project that was to be built on property previously occupied by the La Concha Motel on the Las Vegas Strip, in Winchester, Nevada. The project was announced by La Concha owner Lorenzo Doumani in February 2004. The 42-story condominium tower was to be accompanied by Hilton's Conrad Las Vegas, a Conrad-branded, 37-story hotel that would operate in a separate high-rise building on the same property. The project was initially expected to open in February 2006.

In 2005, the project was redesigned to combine the Majestic and the Conrad into a single tower. Later that year, a new two-tower design was announced as a result of rising construction costs, which made the previous one-tower design financially impossible. In 2006, it was announced that the project would again consist of a single tower, with the top 10 floors to be occupied by The Waldorf-Astoria Residences. In 2007, Majestic Resorts filed a request for arbitration against Hilton after the company pulled out of the project. The undeveloped property was sold that year for $180 million.

In 2019, Doumani received county approval to build a new version of Majestic Las Vegas on the former site of the nearby Clarion Hotel and Casino, which he had imploded four years earlier. This version of Majestic Las Vegas would be a 45-story, non-gaming hotel with 720 rooms. The project would cost $850 million and stand 620 feet, and would be located near the Las Vegas Convention Center and the Las Vegas Strip. The project was delayed several times due to the COVID-19 pandemic, with groundbreaking rescheduled for February 2024, but then postponed again.

== History ==
In 2001, the 5.4-acre site occupied by the La Concha Motel on the Las Vegas Strip – south of the Riviera hotel and casino – was approved for a 520-foot hotel tower, as well as a 645-foot condominium tower that would include a shopping mall. The property was owned by Lorenzo Doumani, whose family had owned the motel since its opening in 1961. Doumani was also the chief executive officer of a Las Vegas film company known as Majestic Entertainment. Demolition of the La Concha began in December 2003, to make room on the property for a new project that would replace it.

=== Announcement ===
On February 18, 2004, Doumani and Hilton Hotels Corporation announced plans for a $250 million joint project for the property that would consist of the Majestic Resort and Residences – a $150 million, 42-story condominium tower – and the Conrad Las Vegas, a $100 million, 37-story all-suite hotel. Both towers would feature an Art Deco appearance. The Conrad Las Vegas would be the third Conrad-branded hotel property to be built in the United States. Hilton stated that there were no plans to add a casino onto the property because of a lack of adequate room for one. The hotel would be aimed primarily at business travelers, while also including amenities such as a spa, a fitness center, and a heated Olympic-sized outdoor swimming pool. The hotel suites were to be an average size of 780 sq ft (72 m^{2}), the largest in Las Vegas.

The Majestic would be the second-tallest structure in Las Vegas, behind the Stratosphere tower. Although the Majestic would have fewer floors than other resort towers in Las Vegas, several of those floors would have rooms that would be taller than the standard size. Condominium units would range from 2,450 to 3,600 sq ft (228 to 334 m^{2}), with prices between $850,000 and $3 million. The Majestic would be the first condominium project to be located on the Las Vegas Strip, and would also be accessible from Paradise Road. The project would include the Majestic Court and Marketplace, consisting of 100,000 sq ft (9,300 m^{2}) of restaurants and shops that would be located on three floors. The project would also include a four-story, 574-space parking garage. A sales office for Majestic was expected to open in late February 2004. The Majestic Las Vegas was to include either 144 condominium units, or 378, while the Conrad Las Vegas would include either 442 rooms, or 378 as well.

Lorenzo Doumani also announced that his father, Ed Doumani, would serve as construction manager on the project. Other members of the Doumani family were also partners in the project. The property, occupied by the remaining structures of the La Concha, was expected to be cleared by July 4, 2004, with construction scheduled to begin in November or December 2004. At the time, discussions were underway to choose a contractor. Negotiations were also being held with the Las Vegas Monorail Company to develop a track that would allow the monorail to pass through the new project. An adjacent Peppermill restaurant south of the property was to remain open during the construction. The project was expected to open in February 2006.

=== Postponements and redesigns ===
By April 2005, plans for a second tower on the property were cancelled because of a dispute regarding an adjacent condominium project by a different development company, which caused investors to become unsure about the Majestic/Conrad project. The project was redesigned to include only one tower on the property that would combine the Conrad hotel and Majestic condominium units. The La Concha's shell-shaped lobby, the only structure on the property that was not demolished, was converted into a sales office for Majestic. In June 2005, sales for Majestic were put on hold because of rising construction costs.

In September 2005, Lorenzo Doumani announced plans for a redesigned two-tower version of Majestic Las Vegas, which was the result of heightened construction costs that had increased 15 percent in the previous 12 months, making it financially impossible to build the project as previously planned. Doumani stated that building one tower would cost $520 million, compared to $600 million for the construction of two towers. In addition, Doumani announced that condominium prices would be raised $200,000 to help finance the project.

With the redesign, a 60-story tower would be used for the Conrad Hotel, with 500 suites, while the condominium tower would be approximately 40 stories and would include 560 units. Plans for the redesigned project were to be finalized in early October 2005. Lorenzo Doumani said he was in the process of locating a contractor for the project, after previously signing with a contractor twice that ultimately became too expensive. Groundbreaking was planned for spring or early summer 2006, with construction of the two towers expected to take 22 months. The Doumanis had wanted to use the La Concha's shell-shaped lobby as the entrance to Majestic Las Vegas' shops or to a club. However, the lobby could not be worked into the design.

Construction was on hold as of November 2005. In October 2006, it was announced that the project would consist of a single 654-foot tower that would contain the Conrad Las Vegas and the condominiums, while the top 10 floors would be occupied by The Waldorf=Astoria Residences. Construction was scheduled to begin in April 2007, with completion in 2009.

In August 2007, Lorenzo Doumani announced that the project was on hold; he later stated that after Hilton was sold to The Blackstone Group in 2007, the company pulled out of the project. In October 2007, the Doumani family sold the undeveloped property to an affiliate of Triple Five Nevada Development Corporation, a real estate development company. The property sold for $180 million, which amounted to a near-record of $33.1 million per acre, and was later put up for sale in 2014, at a price of $16 million per acre. Triple Five still owned the undeveloped site as of 2019.

=== Majestic/Hilton lawsuits ===
In 2007, Majestic Resorts filed a request for arbitration, alleging that Hilton broke its 2004 management agreement to join the design, development and construction of the project by pulling out of it. A three-member arbitration panel rejected Majestic's claim and ordered the company to pay Hilton $834,734 to cover attorney fees, as well as an additional $319,817 in costs. Majestic alleged that one member of the panel, Richard Chernick, was biased because of his previous association with the attorney that represented Hilton in the case. The matter had been raised by Majestic prior to the panel's decision, but Chernick declined to excuse himself from the case, and the company withdrew its objection to his presence prior to the decision. Majestic appealed the case to a District Court judge, who ruled in favor of Hilton. In 2010, the Supreme Court of Nevada upheld the decision.

In September 2011, Hilton filed a lawsuit against Majestic Resorts and the Doumani family to obtain the $1.1 million from the arbitration case, which the company had yet to receive despite the family's $180 million sale of the property. Hilton alleged that in October 2007, after selling the property, Majestic distributed $169 million to its shareholders – members of the Doumani family – leaving the company with $355,000 in cash assets. According to the lawsuit, Lorenzo Doumani later distributed $200,000 to himself. Hilton alleged that such transfers of money were fraudulent and were intended to "hinder, delay and/or defraud Hilton." Lorenzo Doumani said he would fight the lawsuit.

== Other legal challenges ==
=== Conrad name ===
On April 11, 2005, a lawsuit was filed against Hilton by the Conrad Hotel, a two-story 30-room hotel in downtown Las Vegas that opened in 1969. The owners of the Conrad Hotel said that Hilton's new hotel was causing confusion among customers; that three letters were sent to executives of the Conrad Hotels brand and were ignored; and that Hilton knew of the Conrad Hotel's existence since April 2, 2004. Hilton filed a counterclaim on May 25, 2005, believing that the hotel did not have the exclusive right to use the name. Hilton also denied the assertion of customer confusion between the two properties.

=== Icon lawsuits ===
By April 2005, the Doumanis had concerns that a newly proposed neighboring condominium project to the south, which would be known as Icon and would include two 48-story towers, would overshadow the Majestic/Conrad project and would block its views. The Doumanis also had concerns about traffic flow. The Related Companies, the developer of Icon, held 12 meetings with the Doumanis to devise solutions for the family's concerns. Lorenzo Doumani had previously asked The Related Companies to redesign the back (north) side of their second Icon tower to resemble its front side, so that residents of Majestic would not have to face the Icon tower's brick wall. Doumani later asked the developer to rotate their Icon towers 20 degrees to avoid obstructing the views for Majestic's residents, stating, "It won't cost them millions of dollars. They'll spend more on legal fees fighting us than they would just being good neighbors at the end of the day."

When the Las Vegas County Commission approved the Icon project in April 2005, Lorenzo Doumani said he would sue The Related Companies. Doumani said that investors became unsure about the project because of the dispute, resulting in the brief cancellation of a second tower on the property. Doumani later said that the lawsuit primarily related to a disagreement regarding access corridors, as well as proposed garbage and loading docks that would be located near the Majestic's pool. Doumani dropped the lawsuit in September 2005, after The Related Companies agreed to relocate the docks. A separate lawsuit had also been filed against The Related Company by Doumani, and was related to an easement that he believed would intrude on his property, although he and the company were discussing a solution. The Icon project was ultimately cancelled.

== 2019 proposal ==
Majestic Las Vegas

General information
- Status: Proposed
- Type: Hotel
- Location: 305 Convention Center Drive, Paradise, Nevada, United States
- Groundbreaking: February 2024
- Estimated completion: 2027
- Cost: ~$1 billion
- Owner: Lorenzo Doumani

Height
- Height: 620 feet (190 meters)

Technical details
- Floor count: 45

Design and construction
- Developer: Lorenzo Doumani

Other information
- Number of rooms: 720

Website
- majesticlasvegas.com

In May 2019, Doumani received county approval to build Majestic Las Vegas on the former six-acre site of the nearby Clarion Hotel and Casino, which he had imploded four years earlier. For the Majestic project, Doumani spent a year trying to obtain height approval from the Federal Aviation Administration before he could get county approval.

This version of Majestic Las Vegas would be a health-focused resort. It would include a 45-story, non-gaming hotel with 720 rooms, medical offices, and convention space. The resort would also feature six restaurants and a 70,000 sq ft (6,500 m^{2}) medical wellness spa. The spa would give physical examinations and help people improve their lifestyles. Doumani hoped for Majestic Las Vegas to become the most high-end resort in the United States. The top 10 floors will contain office suites for corporations to occupy. Doumani hoped to attract entertainment, fashion, and technology companies. The resort would be located at 305 Convention Center Drive, near the Las Vegas Convention Center and the Las Vegas Strip. It will cater to business travelers, taking advantage of its location across from the convention center.

The project, initially estimated to cost $850 million, would stand 620 feet. Groundbreaking was originally expected for April or May 2020, with completion in the first quarter of 2023. However, the COVID-19 pandemic delayed the start of construction several times, followed by a surge in construction costs, bringing the project to nearly $1 billion. Groundbreaking was rescheduled for February 2024, with construction expected to take three years, with the opening rescheduled for 2027. The 2024 groundbreaking was rescheduled, however, for a future date.

== See also ==
- List of tallest buildings in Las Vegas
