= Jackpot Enterprises =

Jackpot Enterprises, Inc. was an American gambling machine route operator and casino operator from 1980 to the late 1990s, and had its common stock listed on the New York Stock Exchange (NYSE) with the one-letter ticker symbol "J" from 1987 to 2002. It changed its business focus to become a dot-com company as J Net Enterprises, Inc. during the dot-com bubble, and later became Epoch Holding Corporation, owning an investment management firm.

== History ==
=== Gambling operations ===
Jackpot Enterprises was incorporated in Nevada in June 1980 to take over two existing route operators, Cardivan Company and Corral United, Inc. From 1980 to 1995 it also came to acquire majority ownership of Corral Coin, Inc. and Corral Country Coin, Inc.

Jackpot acquired the Owl Club in Battle Mountain on July 1, 1990, and the Nugget in downtown Reno on June 30, 1995. It began its operation of the casino at Debbie Reynolds' Hollywood Hotel and Casino in Las Vegas on June 28, 1993, and of the Pony Express Casino at the Holiday Inn Express motel in Jackpot, Nevada on January 26, 1995.

Jackpot and President Riverboat Casinos operated a joint dockside casino at Mhoon Landing, Mississippi in 1993 and 1994, but closed it on July 8, 1994. Jackpot also operated casinos in Deadwood, South Dakota, but closed them on June 30, 1995. In February 1995, it also ended operations at Water Street Casino, Inc., which was doing business as the Post Office Casino.

Jackpot also had route operations at several retail store chains, including the stores owned by Albertsons, American Stores, Kmart, Thrifty PayLess, and Warehouse Markets, Inc. These retail store route operations provided around half of Jackpot's revenue in 1995.

=== J Net ===
In early March 2000, the company suddenly shifted its primary business focus to technology-related investments, investment management, and dot-com business incubation. It took a controlling stake in Meister Brothers Investments, and later in InterWorld Corporation.

Jackpot changed its name to J Net Enterprises, Inc., on December 6, 2000, weeks after selling its slot route operations to the Herbst family for $41 million.

J Net was delisted from the NYSE on May 8, 2002, and began trading on the Over-the-Counter Bulletin Board (OTCBB) with the ticker symbol "JNEI".

InterWorld Corporation, which was J Net's e-commerce software business and 95% owned by J Net, filed for Chapter 7 bankruptcy in May 2004. InterWorld had been under investigation by the Securities and Exchange Commission since March 2001, for events that occurred before J Net acquired InterWorld.

=== Epoch ===
Epoch Investment Partners, Inc. (EIP) was formed as an investment advisory firm in April 2004 by William W. Priest. J Net acquired EIP on June 4, 2004.

J Net declared its intention to get out of the e-commerce and technology infrastructure businesses by June 2004 and concentrate solely on investment management and advisory service. It sold off its electronic commerce software subsidiary, IW Holdings, Inc., to IWH management in September 2004, and shut down the technology infrastructure business, leaving EIP as the only remaining business.

To convert itself into a Delaware corporation, J Net Enterprises formed Epoch Holding Corporation on November 29, 2004, and merged itself into Epoch Holding Corporation on December 3, 2004. The new corporation was headquartered in New York City.

Epoch's shares switched from over-the-counter to the NASDAQ Capital Market on October 4, 2005.

Epoch was sold to the Toronto-Dominion Bank in March 2013. The last Epoch Holding Corporation filing with the Securities and Exchange Commission was in April 2013.
