= La Concha Motel =

Defunct motel in Las Vegas, Nevada, United States

Coordinates: 36.134°N 115.162°W

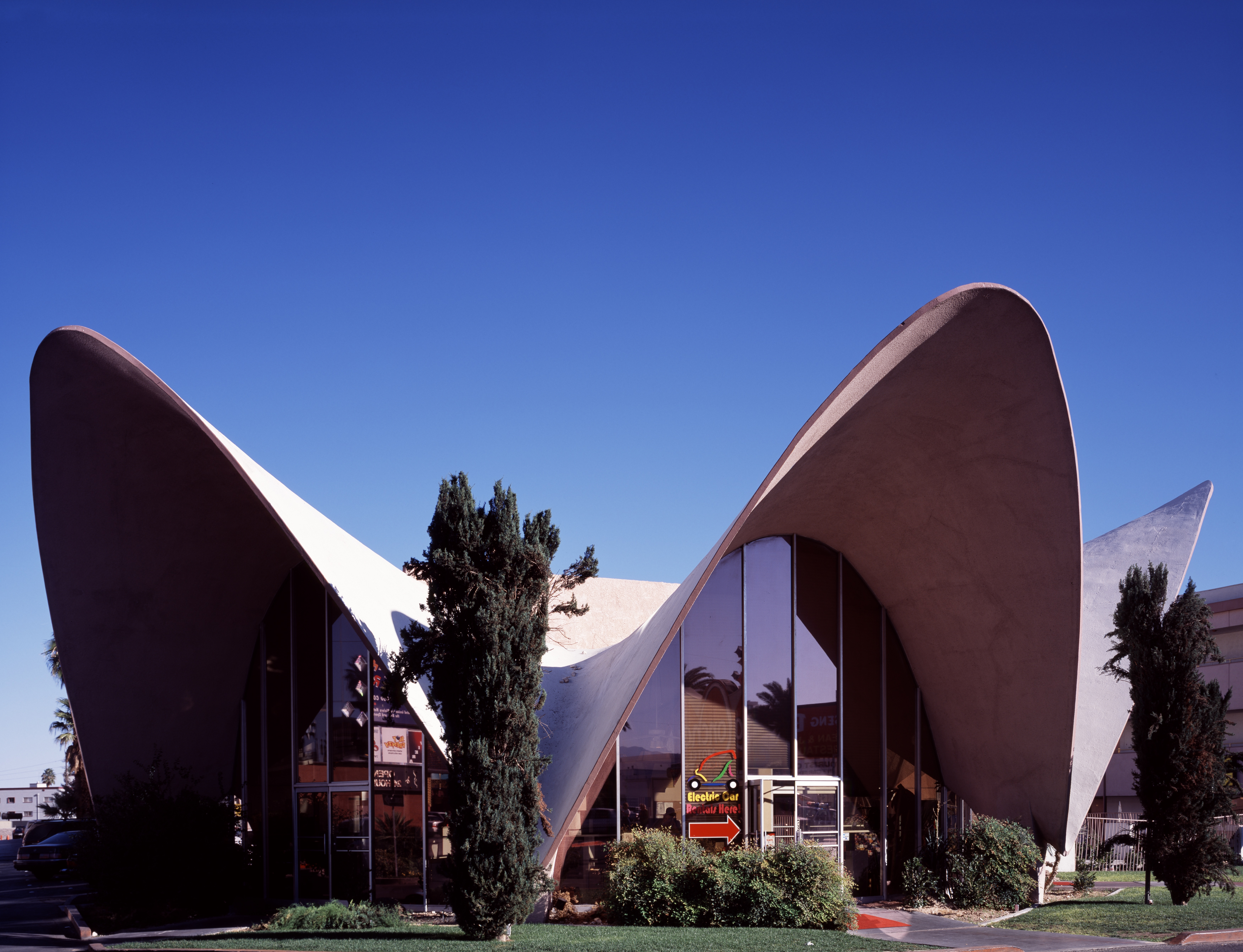
- The motel lobby building

General information
- Location: Las Vegas, Nevada 89109, 2955 Las Vegas Blvd South
- Named for: Beach of La Concha
- Opening: 1961
- Closed: 2004
- Owner: Ed Doumani; Fred Doumani Sr.

Technical details
- Grounds: 5.4 acres (2.2 ha)

Design and construction
- Architect: Paul Williams

Other information
- Number of rooms: 350

The La Concha Motel was a motel that opened in 1961 and closed in 2004. It was designed by architect Paul Williams who was one of the first prominent African American architects in the United States and was also the architect who designed the first LAX theme building. It was located at 2955 Las Vegas Blvd South, on the Las Vegas Strip, in Winchester, Nevada, and was considered one of the best-preserved examples of 1950s Googie architecture. It is believed to be named after the Beach of La Concha in Spain.

== History ==
The La Concha was opened by M.K. Doumani. When it opened, the La Concha was one of the larger properties on the Las Vegas Strip. Various celebrities had stayed at the motel, including Ronald Reagan, Ann-Margret, Flip Wilson, Muhammad Ali, and the Carpenters. The La Concha was featured in the 1995 film Casino. In its later years, the motel was owned by M.K. Doumani's sons: Edward and Fred Doumani. The Doumani family also owned the adjacent El Morocco.

In March 2001, Ed Doumani said he was considering options for the La Concha, saying, "Property taxes are huge and power is expensive." Doumani also complained of various costs such as a mandated beautification project of the Las Vegas Strip, in which each property had to help fund a new median with foliage and trees: "I had to pay $295,000 for what amounted to five palm trees. A large place can absorb that, we can't. We're probably going to knock (La Concha) down sometime this year. The land is more valuable than the buildings on it." At that time, the La Concha had been maintaining a high occupancy rate, despite lacking typical amenities such as a restaurant, casino, pool, and room service. Despite the motel's success, Doumani planned to replace it with a boutique hotel that would include condominiums and shopping, which he said would be a better use of the land.

Later in 2001, the property was approved for a 520-foot hotel tower, a 645-foot condominium tower, and a shopping mall. In late 2003, it was announced that La Concha would be closed and demolished to make room for a new project, later announced as the Majestic condominium/Conrad hotel resort. On December 11, 2003, a 100-room wing of the motel was demolished. Before being fully demolished, the La Concha was expected to continue operating for another six months, with a nine-story tower located in the back of the property, and with 139 rooms at the former El Morocco motel. The property was expected to be cleared by July 4, 2004.

The motel lobby was a concrete shell lobby. The motel sections of La Concha Motel and the former El Morocco Motel next door were torn down in 2005. By August 2005, only the lobby was still standing; it served as a sales office for the Majestic condominiums. By that point, Doumani had donated the lobby to the city's Neon Museum, which hoped to raise $600,000 to divide the lobby and reassemble it at the museum. The Doumanis had hoped to integrate the shell-shaped lobby into the Majestic project as the entrance to its shops or to a club. However, the lobby could not be worked into the design. In November 2005, the Las Vegas Convention and Visitors Authority agreed to provide $300,000 for the lobby's relocation effort. Later that month, a reception was held to help raise the rest of the money necessary for the lobby's relocation. In January 2006, the full $600,000 was in place. The lobby was relocated at the end of the year.

The La Concha Motel is now restored in the Neon Museum. The museum saved part of the hotel sign designed by the Young Electric Sign Company.

The La Concha motel neighbored the now-defunct El Morocco Motel, Riviera Hotel and Casino, and the Silver City Casino. The motel's sign, before it was removed, read "COLOR TV" and included advertisements.

The Majestic/Conrad project was ultimately cancelled. Triple Five Group purchased the land in 2007, and put it up for sale in 2014. In 2022, the property was sold to The Siegel Group for $75 million. The company plans to eventually redevelop the site, possibly with a hotel-casino.

== See also ==
- List of motels
