= United Coin Machine =

American slot route operator

- Industry: Casino games
- Founded: 1958
- Fate: acquired by Century Gaming Technologies
- Headquarters: Paradise, Nevada, USA
- Key people: Bernard Shapiro
- Website: unitedcoin.com

United Coin Machine Co. was an American slot route operator based in Paradise, Nevada. It operated slot machines in locations such as bars, convenience stores, and grocery stores. For many years, United Coin was the largest slot route operator in Nevada.

== History ==
United Coin was founded in 1958. Bernard Shapiro, who had owned a coin machine business in Northern California, and a small stake in the Royal Nevada casino, started the company after the Royal Nevada went out of business.

Advanced Patent Technology purchased the company in 1979.

In 1980, Advanced Patent reached an agreement to sell United Coin to Bristol Silver Mines Co. for $13 million in cash and stock. Advanced Patent withdrew from the offer three months later, though, saying that United Coin was now "more desirable".

In 2000, United Coin's parent, now known as Alliance Gaming, agreed to sell the company for $112 million in cash plus $6 million in preferred stock to gaming developers Michael Luzich and Daniel Kehl. Alliance canceled the deal a year later due to increased profits at United Coin.

In 2004, Century Gaming bought United Coin for $100 million cash plus $5 million in assumed debt.

The company sold off its operations in Northern Nevada to another slot route operator in 2013, but then returned to the region in 2015, placing machines at a chain of sports bars.

In July 2014, the company dropped the United Coin name and rebranded its operations in Nevada and Montana as Century Gaming Technologies.
