= The Green Shack =

- Green Shack
- U.S. National Register of Historic Places
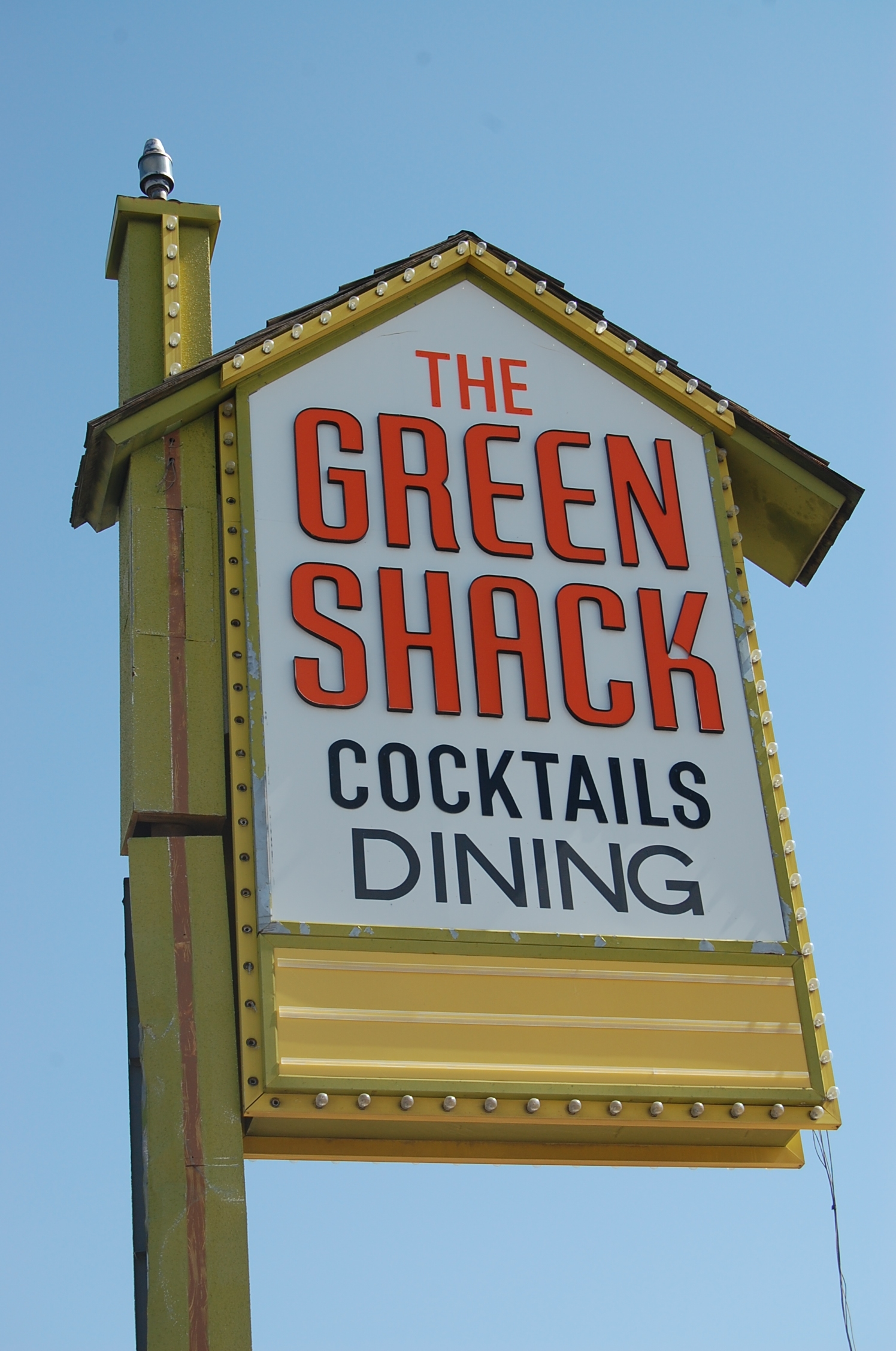
- Sign for the Green Shack

- Location within Nevada Location within the United States
- Location: 2504 E. Fremont, Las Vegas, Nevada
- Coordinates: 36°9′28″N 115°6′53″W
- Area: less than one acre
- Built: 1932
- Architectural style: Late 19th And Early 20th Century American Movements, barracks construction
- NRHP reference No.: 94000552
- Added to NRHP: June 03, 1994

The Green Shack was a restaurant located on Fremont Street in Las Vegas, Nevada that is listed on the United States National Register of Historic Places. It was opened by Mattie Jones and was famous for its fried chicken.

== History ==
Opened in 1929 and known as the Colorado when it opened on Christmas Eve 1929, the Green Shack had previously been the Swanky Club. With the addition of an old Union Pacific Railroad barracks for expansion, it was renamed Green Shack in 1932. The green paint on the addition was the source of the new name.

The building was listed on the National Register of Historic Places on June 3, 1994.

The Green Shack closed in May 1999 by Jim and Barbara McCormick, who were the owners at the time, and was demolished several years later. When it closed, the Green Shack was the oldest restaurant in Las Vegas.

== See also ==
- List of restaurants in the Las Vegas Valley

== Sources ==
- Roadside Peek
