= The Platinum =

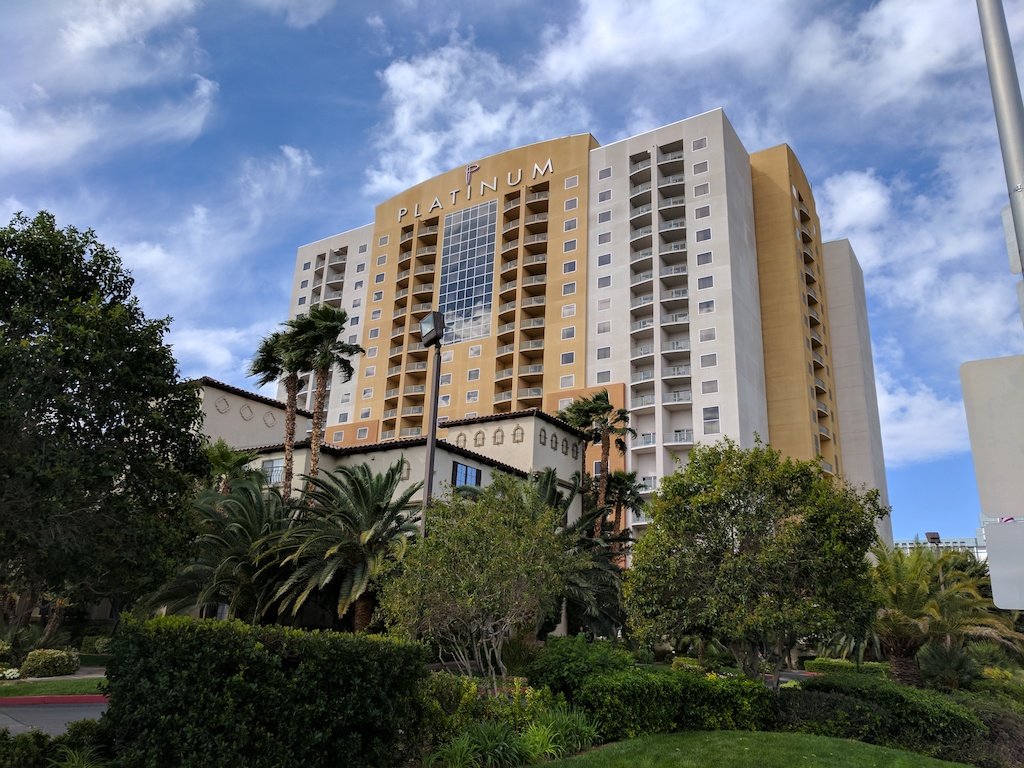
- Interactive map of the The Platinum area

General information
- Status: Completed
- Type: Condo hotel
- Location: 211 East Flamingo Road, Paradise, Nevada, United States
- Coordinates: 36.113826°N 115.162956°W
- Construction started: 2005
- Topped-out: December 15, 2005
- Opened: October 25, 2006
- Cost: $120 million
- Owner: Marcus Corporation

Height
- Height: 235 feet

Technical details
- Floor count: 17

Design and construction
- Architecture firm: Morris & Brown Architects
- Developer: Platinum Condominium Development, LLC
- Main contractor: Residential Constructors

Other information
- Number of units: 255

Website
- Official website

The Platinum is a 17-story, 255-unit condo hotel located at 211 East Flamingo Road in Paradise, Nevada, east of the Las Vegas Strip. The project was approved in 2003, and began construction in 2005, as a joint venture between Diversified Real Estate Concepts, Inc. and Marcus Hotels and Resorts. The project was topped out in December 2005, and was opened in October 2006. In 2009, buyers filed lawsuits against Marcus for various allegations; the last of the lawsuits were settled in March 2013.

== History ==
=== Early history ===
The property began in 1974, as the Highlander 6 Inn motel. The motel became a Comfort Inn between 1990 and 1993. By 2001, the motel was operating as an Econo Lodge. Michael Peterson, the president and chief executive officer of Diversified Real Estate Concepts, Inc., purchased the land in 2003. Peterson had developed several restaurants and condominiums in Chicago and Wisconsin, and was also planning the nearby Aqua Blue condominium/hotel/casino in Las Vegas until its cancellation.

=== Design and approval ===
In October 2003, the Clark County Commission approved plans for a 24-story, 210-foot condo hotel with 255 rooms to be built on the 1.7-acre (0.69 ha) property, located at the southeast intersection of East Flamingo Road and Koval Lane. The project had previously been approved by the Clark County Planning Commission. A resident in the nearby Park Towers appealed the Planning Commission's approval because of concerns about parking and increased traffic that would be caused by the new project, as well as its obstruction of views of the nearby Las Vegas Strip; the resident's attorney noted that Park Towers contained less than 90 units on 3.8 acres (1.5 ha) while the new project would include more than 250 units on 1.7 acres.

By the time of the commission's approval, the project was already supported by Park Towers' developer, Irwin Molasky, and its homeowner association, after the project was altered to accommodate Park Towers' residents; Diversifed Real Estate reduced the new project's unit count from 334 to 255, and reduced its height from 293 feet to 210 feet, at which point the homeowner association withdrew its objection. The new project was also situated further back on the property to limit potential traffic issues.

Sherman Architecture was the project's design consultant, while the project's primary architect was Morris & Brown Architects of Solana Beach, California. At the time of approval, Robert Sherman, the architect for Diversified Real Estate's Las Vegas projects, said that construction could begin in 12 to 18 months, with a possible opening in three years. Sherman also said that construction would cost between $60 million and $80 million. Demolition of the two-story, 130-room Econo Lodge was approved in November 2003.

=== Construction and opening ===
Platinum Condominium Development, LLC was formed as a joint venture between Marcus Hotels and Resorts and Diversified Real Estate Concepts, Inc. On January 27, 2004, it was announced that the project would be known as The Platinum Suite Hotel & Spa. Diversified Real Estate would be responsible for marketing The Platinum, and would oversee construction with Marcus Hotels, which would operate the hotel upon its opening. The Platinum's 255 units were to range between 911 sq ft (84.6 m^{2}) and 2,166 sq ft (201.2 m^{2}), with prices between $300,000 and $1 million. Construction was expected to begin in late August or early September 2004, with a scheduled opening in early 2006. The Platinum sold out all its units in 39 days. In January 2005, McCarthy Building Companies expected to begin construction later in the month, with completion expected for spring 2006.

In April 2005, Residential Constructors – a subsidiary of McCarthy Building Companies – completed the Platinum's foundation after a 17-hour concrete pour, making up 5,300 cubic yards of cement. Approximately 50 construction workers monitored the process, which required 60 concrete trucks to maintain a pour of 440 cubic yards per hour. Most of the property was taken up by the foundation. The Platinum was scheduled for completion in May 2006. Residential Constructors topped out the 17-story tower on December 15, 2005. Construction, expected to cost $112 million, was on track for completion in May 2006.

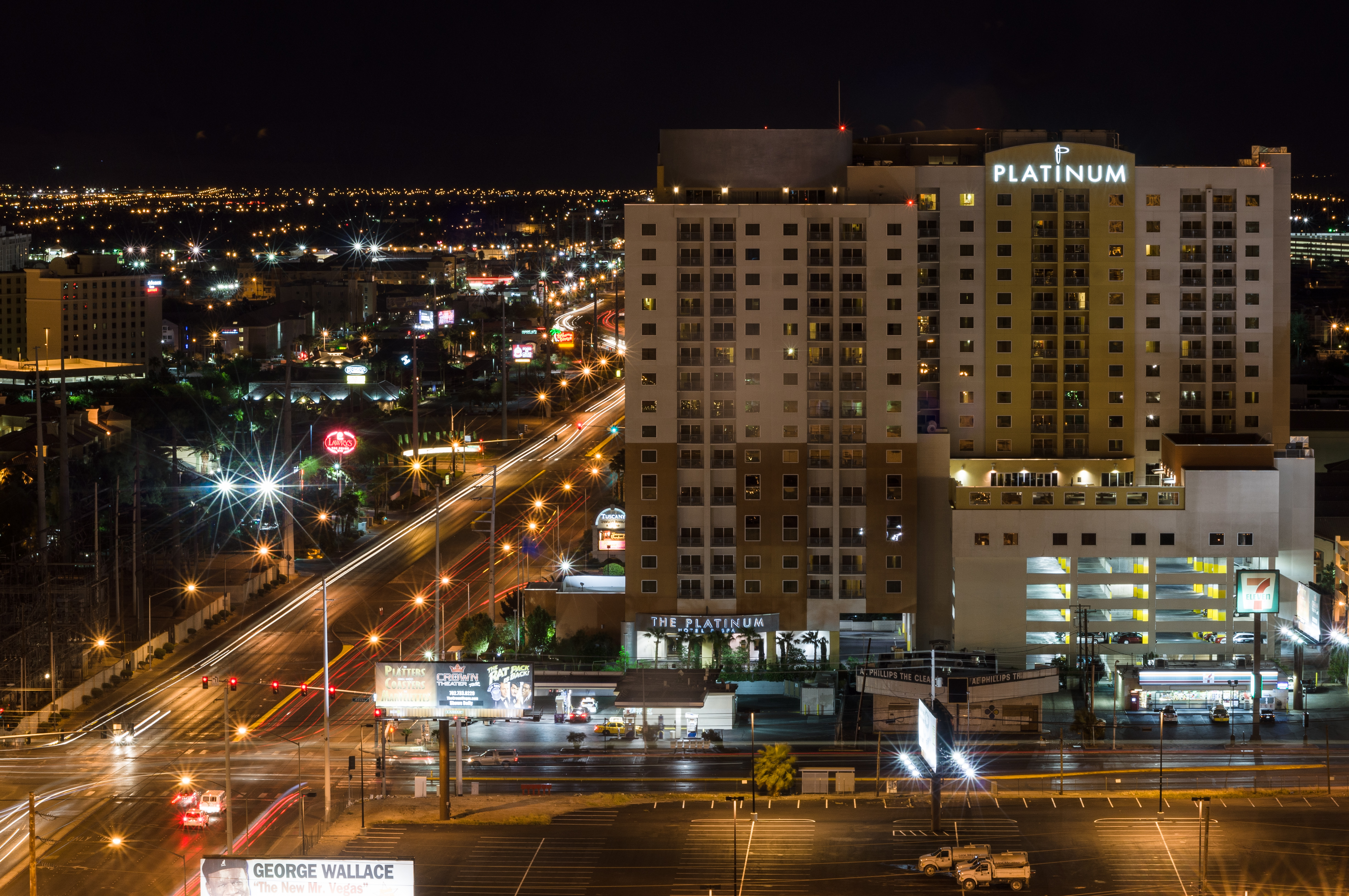
The Platinum in 2012

The Platinum opened on October 25, 2006, with construction costing a total of $120 million. The project includes 400,000 sq ft (37,000 m^{2}) of total living space. Amenities included a fitness center, a spa, a lounge, a restaurant, 24-hour room service, concierge, valet parking, an indoor-outdoor pool, and a rooftop terrace. The Platinum was among the first condo hotels to open near the Las Vegas Strip. In January 2007, Peterson sold his share of the Platinum to Marcus Corporation. In October 2008, Luxury Suites International was in negotiations to manage units at the Platinum.

=== Lawsuits ===
In July 2009, 24 buyers of the Platinum's condominiums filed lawsuits against Platinum Condominium Development LLC and Marcus Corporation, alleging that they breached contracts by failing to market the buyers' units for rental purposes. The lawsuit also alleged that Platinum and Marcus had not properly shared rental revenue with the buyers, that they fraudulently withheld information regarding the project's development, and that they violated the Nevada Deceptive Trade Practices Act. The lawsuit stated: "False projections of rental rates, occupancy rates, and the 'quality' of Platinum Condominiums as an excellent investment opportunity were made by the sales agents, at the direction and approval of Platinum and Marcus." Both companies denied the allegations.

Attorneys for Marcus stated that one of the plaintiffs was "apparently plagued by buyer's remorse now that the Las Vegas real estate and tourism markets have collapsed on an unprecedented scale." The buyers sought access to financial records for the project, as well as the rescission of their sales contracts. The last of the lawsuits were settled in March 2013, with Marcus paying out a total of $3 million.
