= Steven Cyr =

Steven Cyr is a development executive at the Ellis Island Casino & Brewery. He also works as an independent casino host at casinos outside of Las Vegas.

== Early life ==
Cyr grew up in Salina, Kansas. His father operated a Howard Johnson Hotel, at which Cyr regularly worked. Cyr set out to take over the family business and moved to Las Vegas in 1983 to attend the University of Nevada-Las Vegas (UNLV) hotel management program.

== Education ==
At UNLV, Cyr took many gambling-related classes– including casino management, marketing, and mathematics- in order to gain insight into casino games and player psyche.

During his senior year of college, Cyr was selected for an internship at Barbary Coast, where he worked under casino mogul Michael Gaughan.

== Career ==
In college, Cyr sold vitamins over the phone before beginning casino work at Barbary Coast in the sports book for $50 a shift.

In 1991, Cyr began his career as a slot host at Caesar's Palace. Next, he became senior host at the Hilton and was consistently the largest producing casino host. He received his first big break after searching a dumpster for lists of high-rolling gamblers. By 2002, Cyr was named Las Vegas Life's Best Casino Host.

As of 2015, Cyr had worked in the casino industry for the past 28 years. He maintains a roster of 70 active high roller clients referred to as “whales.”

In 2010, Cyr founded ISC Consulting, an independent consulting company consisting of a network of professional casino hosts who pair players with casino properties. His compensation as an independent host varies, depending on state law. In California casinos, Cyr receives a percentage of his clients’ losses.

Cyr also serves as a guest lecturer at Cornell University.

== Media ==
Cyr has appeared on over 20 TV shows, including appearances on the Discovery Channel and the Travel Channel as well as interviews with Montel Williams and Piers Morgan.

Cyr has been featured in print publications such as Cigar Aficionado and Details.

Whale Hunt in the Desert, a book based on Cyr's career, is required reading for students in Cornell University's Hotel School casino elective as well as in NYU Stern's MBA program.
