= One Las Vegas =

- Interactive map of the One Las Vegas area

General information
- Type: Condominiums
- Location: 8255 South Las Vegas Boulevard, Enterprise, Nevada, United States
- Coordinates: 36.039821°N 115.175529°W
- Topped-out: January 19, 2007 (first tower April 2007 (second tower)
- Opened: June 2008
- Cost: $150 million
- Renovation cost: $2 million (2015)

Technical details
- Floor count: 20

Design and construction
- Architect: Kobi Karp
- Developer: Amland Development; B.S.R. Group
- Main contractor: J.E. Dunn Construction

Other information
- Number of units: 359

One Las Vegas is a condominium property in Enterprise, Nevada, south of the Las Vegas Strip. It consists of two 20-story towers with a total of 359 condominium units. Construction was underway in 2006, and the towers opened in June 2008. The following year, One Las Vegas entered foreclosure because of low sales, caused by the Great Recession.

Ownership of the remaining units changed several times over the next few years, and the property had 225 unsold units as of 2017, although sales increased after the Oakland Raiders announced their relocation to Las Vegas.

== History ==
=== Construction ===
One Las Vegas was built near the intersection of South Las Vegas Boulevard and Windmill Lane. It was announced in February 2005, as a joint project between Amland Development and B.S.R. Group, an international developer based in Israel. Chet Nichols, executive vice president for Amland Development, was working with Wells Fargo, Wachovia and Hypo Real Estate Capital to devise a financial package to help build the project. Grading on the 20-acre property was expected to begin in late February 2005, with construction of the first two towers – standing 20 stories high – expected to begin in July 2005. In February 2005, Amland won the legal rights to use the "One Las Vegas" name, which had also been chosen by Del American for their own condominium project. Sales began on April 7, 2005. The project was designed by Kobi Karp.

The first phase, expected to cost $142 million, was under construction in April 2006, with excavation, grading, and underground utility work occurring on the property. J.E. Dunn Construction of Kansas City served as the general contractor. The first phase consisted of two condominium towers, scheduled for completion in December 2007. Approximately 50 percent of the first phase had been presold up to that point. A total of five towers – standing 18 to 21 stories – were ultimately planned for the property, with a final total of 890 condominium units. A 200-room boutique hotel and a 200-unit condo hotel – both of which would be operated by the same company – were also planned at that time. By that point, Amland had gained financing from Corus Bank, which fully financed the project for $142 million. Units ranged in price from the $400,000s for an 850 sq ft (79 m^{2}) one-bedroom unit to $1.8 million for a 2,850 sq ft (265 m^{2}) penthouse. Units initially started at $275,000 when the project was announced.

In October 2006, construction was underway on the two towers, which were expected to have a total of 359 units, with an ultimate total of 960 units when all five towers were completed. The 182-unit first tower was topped off on January 19, 2007, with completion scheduled for late 2007. Construction on the second tower was up to the 16th floor. Approximately 400 construction workers were on the project. The second tower was topped off in April 2007, and was expected to be completed in early 2008. Opening delays were attributed to excessive construction activity in Las Vegas, and to the fact that inspections of safety systems did not occur as initially scheduled.

=== Operation and sales ===
In June 2008, certificates of occupancy were issued for the two towers, which cost $150 million to construct. At the time, discussions were underway with two hotel companies for the 220-room boutique hotel. There were also plans for office and retail space. In April 2009, One Las Vegas entered foreclosure because of low sales, caused by the Great Recession. The property was taken over by Corus Bank, which planned to offer units at a 50 percent discount. After Corus Bank failed in September 2009, Starwood Property Trust (also known as ST Residential) acquired the project a month later and began renting the units in 2010, because of poor sales; less than 75 of the 359 units had closed on their sales. The other three towers were not built.

In 2013, ST Residential sold the remaining 295 units to DK Las Vegas: a partnership between KRE Capital, based in California, and Dune Real Estate Partners, based in New York. Upgrades totaling $2 million were completed in 2015. As of 2017, there were still 225 unsold units in One Las Vegas. Sales increased during 2017 and 2018, after the Oakland Raiders announced their relocation to Las Vegas.
