= Boca Raton (condominiums) =

- Interactive map of the Boca Raton area

General information
- Type: Condominiums
- Location: West Serene Avenue, Enterprise, Nevada, United States
- Coordinates: 36.020115°N 115.174857°W
- Groundbreaking: November 17, 2004
- Opened: Mid-2007

Technical details
- Floor count: 7

Design and construction
- Architecture firm: Pierce Goodwin Alexander and Linville
- Developer: Palm Beach Resort Condominiums LLC
- Engineer: Wright Engineering
- Main contractor: Martin Harris Construction

Other information
- Number of units: 378

Boca Raton is a mid-rise condominium property in Enterprise, Nevada, south of the Las Vegas Strip. The property consists of two seven-story buildings with a total of 378 units. Construction began in 2004, and the property opened in mid-2007. A second phase, consisting of two additional buildings, was canceled due to poor sales in the original buildings, a result of the Great Recession.

== History ==
=== Construction ===
In January 2004, Las Vegas-based Palm Beach Resort Condominiums LLC purchased 15 acres (6.1 ha) of land at the southwest corner of South Las Vegas Boulevard and Serene Avenue, at a cost of $12.8 million. Unlike other condominium projects in the Las Vegas area, Palm Beach Resort received county approval for Boca Raton, had the project designed, and began construction before taking reservations. Stewart Simpson, the senior vice president of development for the project, said at the start of construction, "Most of these projects, they have a concept, they option for a piece of land and go out and start explaining it. Instead of saying we have this dream and hope we can make it happen, we had a dream and we didn't tell anyone about it and did our homework." The project was designed by Pierce Goodwin Alexander and Linville (PGAL).

Groundbreaking for the first phase began on November 17, 2004, with completion expected for February 2006. Boca Raton was planned to ultimately consist of four seven-story towers, with a total of 756 units. Prices were expected to start at $200,000. The project was also planned to include a two-story underground parking garage. Las Vegas-based Wright Engineers was the structural project engineer, while UPA Resort Construction Group was the general contractor. JPMorgan Chase provided a $134 million construction loan for the project.

Martin Harris Construction became the general contractor in 2005, and Boca Raton's opening was delayed several times because of construction. By December 2005, the mid-rise project had sold 270 units in its first two buildings, which contained a total of 378 units. The February 2006 opening had been delayed by that point. Following the completion of the underground parking garage, upward construction was underway as of January 2006, with the first 172 units scheduled to open in December 2006. By May 2006, basketball player Paul Pierce had purchased a unit in the project.

Both buildings had been topped out by August 2006. The buildings used 16,000 cubic yards of concrete and 2,000 tons of steel, with 250,000 hours spent working on them up to that point. Completion of the first phase was scheduled for January 2007, and would include a 10,000 sq ft (930 m^{2}) clubhouse. Construction was nearing completion in late May 2007, and residents were expected to move in by June. The second phase was to be finished by late 2009.

=== Opening and sales ===
Approximately 70 people moved in during July 2007, and the 378-unit first phase was entirely finished in October. It was announced that construction for the second phase was 12 to 18 months away. Approximately 160 units were sold in 2007, but sales decreased the following year due to the Great Recession. Unit purchases stopped entirely in 2009, and the other two buildings were canceled before the start of construction, due to the poor economy. JPMorgan Chase sued Boca Raton's developer in 2010, alleging default of the construction loan. In 2011, an investment group purchased Boca Raton.

In December 2017, the group listed the remaining 210 unsold units for sale in a bulk offer. Joseph Daneshgar, a southern California investor and the founder of 3D Investments, purchased the units in August 2018, at a cost of $44 million.
