= List of condominiums in Las Vegas =

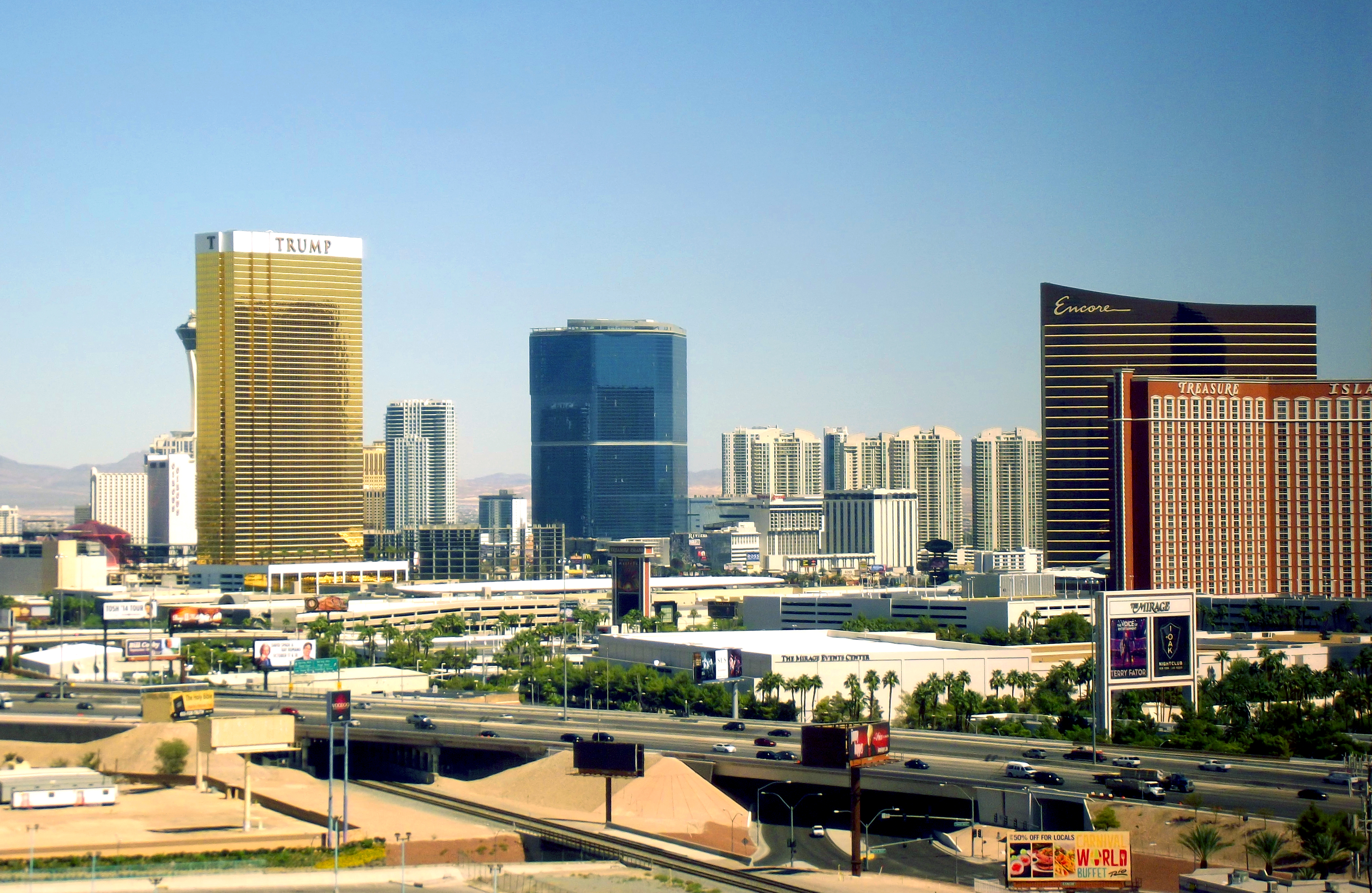
Several high-rise condominiums are located along the Las Vegas Strip

Since the 1990s, various condominium projects have been proposed for the Las Vegas Valley. Park Towers and Turnberry Place, two high-rise condominium properties located near the Las Vegas Strip, were completed in 2001; they subsequently inspired a condominium boom that started in 2003, when various developers began announcing projects that were planned throughout the Las Vegas Valley.

Many projects were ultimately cancelled because of a rise in construction costs, as well as a lack of skilled construction workers and contractors who were qualified to build high-rises; both reasons were attributed to the large number of projects being announced. The following list includes notable condominium projects that were both completed and cancelled, as well as projects that are on hold.

== History ==
=== Early history ===
Regency Towers, built in 1974, was the first high-rise condominium property to open in the Las Vegas Valley, with 226-units. The property was initially unsuccessful, selling only eight units before going into foreclosure. In the late 1990s, Las Vegas was the fastest-growing area in the United States. As a result, five new high-rise condominium projects were being planned for the Las Vegas Valley in 1998, for a total of 12 new condominium towers. Among the five proposed projects was Turnberry Place and Park Towers.

=== Condominium boom ===
High-rise condominiums became a popular trend in the Las Vegas Valley after the opening of Turnberry Place and Park Towers in 2001. Numerous high-rise condominium projects were subsequently announced beginning in 2003, starting a condominium boom. Real estate experts predicted that only 20 to 50 percent of the announced projects would actually get built. The condo-hotel concept was introduced in the Las Vegas Valley in September 2003, at MonteLago Village at Lake Las Vegas. At the end of the year, plans were underway for the first high-rise condominium in downtown Las Vegas: Soho Lofts.

The condominium boom was sometimes referred to as the "Manhattanization of Las Vegas". The term was first used in 1999, by Steve Bottfeld, the owner of a Las Vegas real estate consulting firm. The term was popularized by Richard Lee – director of public relations for First American Title Company – after he used it during a presentation. Lee was a well-known local proponent of the high-rise condominium boom, and spoke frequently about it at local conferences and seminars. Lee had used the term as early as 2003; it was later used as the title for Manhattanizing Las Vegas, a 2005 book by Paul Murad that chronicled the Las Vegas condominium boom. A website called Manhattanization.com was also created to cover the local high-rise market.

By January 2005, 122 high-rise condominium buildings with a total of nearly 17,000 units had been announced. The tallest proposed project was the 73-story Summit, which also had the most expensive price listed for a unit: $35 million. The lowest price was $139,900 for units at the 51-story Las Vegas Central. New condominium projects, when completed, were expected to create an increase in visitation to local casinos. Many of the proposed high-rise condominiums were to be built along the Las Vegas Strip in hopes of maximizing buyer interest.

The Krystle Sands high-rise, to be built on the Las Vegas Strip, became the first of the newly proposed condominium projects to be cancelled, in March 2005. By May 2005, there were plans for approximately 25,000 condominium units and 8,300 condo-hotel units in the Las Vegas Valley. Some condominium projects were aided by the publicity of celebrities who purchased units in them. As of December 2005, at least 70 condominium towers had been announced for the Las Vegas Valley during the previous 12 months. Multiple projects had been cancelled up to that point. Some developers sold their land to make back a profit. Most of the surviving condo projects were those situated on and near the Las Vegas Strip.

Many projects were cancelled because of rising construction costs, as well as a lack of skilled construction workers and contractors who were capable of building high-rise structures. The rising costs and limited workers were both attributed to the large number of high-rise condominium projects that were being planned. While most of the cancelled condominium projects did not have difficulty selling, their respective developers could not build the projects at a suitable cost due to construction expenses rising 30 percent to 50 percent. In February 2006, representatives from six projects announced the formation of the Las Vegas High Rise and Condominium Alliance, which would promote the mid-rise and high-rise condominium market in Las Vegas.

In April 2006, Murad – who was planning the 39-story Gateway Las Vegas condominium tower – stated that Las Vegas had entered its second phase of "Manhattanization", saying, "This first phase of Manhattanizing is over. Now we're entering the second phase. What happened in Las Vegas over the last few years is amazing, going from a couple of high rises to a hundred. That hasn't happened anywhere else in the world." The Platinum and The Signature at MGM Grand, the first projects near the Las Vegas Strip to offer condo-hotel units, were completed in 2006.

By that point, after the cancellations of several high-rise condominium projects, banks had become more resistant to developers who were seeking construction financing for proposed projects. Two banks were heavily involved in Las Vegas' high-rise condominium market at that time: Corus Bank and Hypo Real Estate Corporation. Corus had $770 million of its loan portfolio allocated to Las Vegas condominium projects, while Hypo had approximately $850 million allocated to such projects. During 2006, multiple condominium projects were under construction in downtown Las Vegas. Mayor Oscar Goodman, who was elected in 1999, had made it a priority to revitalize the downtown area. Sky Las Vegas, finished in 2007, was the first high-rise condominium to be completed on the Las Vegas Strip.

=== Economic downturn and resurgence ===
Sales of high-rise condominiums began to decrease in 2008. The condo-hotel market, consisting of projects on and near the Las Vegas Strip, also suffered that year because of low sales; thousands of condo-hotel units had been cancelled up to that point. By the end of 2008, only three additional developers had successfully completed condominium high-rises near the Las Vegas Strip: MGM Mirage (The Signature), Donald Trump (Trump International), and Andrew Fonfa (Allure Las Vegas). In 2009, condominium and condo-hotel units on and near the Las Vegas Strip were still struggling to sell because of the 2008 financial crisis.

As of August 2009, less than 25 percent of the proposed condominium projects had been built, as predicted by some analysts; developers of projects that were completed were having difficulty selling their units as a result of the 2008 recession. Sales of high-rise condominiums increased seven percent in the third quarter of 2009, although condo-hotels continued to struggle. Poor condominium sales continued into the following year. In June 2010, there were 5,500 high-rise condominium units and 5,400 condo-hotel units in the Las Vegas Valley. By that point, developers of several high-rise condominium properties had begun renting their vacant units, which were left unsold because of the poor economy.

Sales of high-rise condominiums had increased in 2011, with many units being sold at a reduced cost through bank sales, short sales, and foreclosures to investors, who would subsequently improve and flip the units. The largest increase occurred at properties on and near the Las Vegas Strip. However, sales of new condominiums were down, and the condo-hotel market also continued to suffer. High-rise sales were expected to increase in 2015 as the market continued to recover.

By 2016, the construction industry in Las Vegas had been revived, although there were no plans for any new high-rise condominium projects. Prices for existing high-rise condominiums had increased by that time. Demand for high-rise homes on the Las Vegas Strip was projected to increase because of the opening of the T-Mobile Arena, as well as the announcement of an NHL expansion franchise and discussions about a potential NFL team in Las Vegas. Sales continued to increase through 2018, partly because of the relocation of the Oakland Raiders to Las Vegas.

== Completed projects ==
=== Allure Las Vegas ===
Allure began construction in 2005. Located west of the Las Vegas Strip, it was completed in December 2007, and was the tallest residential building within Las Vegas city limits at that time, standing 41 stories high with a total of 428 units. The tower was built at a cost of $150 million. A second tower was cancelled because of poor sales in the first tower caused by the Great Recession, and because of an oversupply of condominium high-rises on the Las Vegas Strip.

=== Boca Raton ===
Boca Raton consists of two seven-story buildings with a total of 378 units, located south of the Las Vegas Strip. Groundbreaking took place in 2004, and the project ultimately opened in 2007. However, sales were poor due to the Great Recession, and plans for two additional buildings were canceled.

=== Jockey Club ===
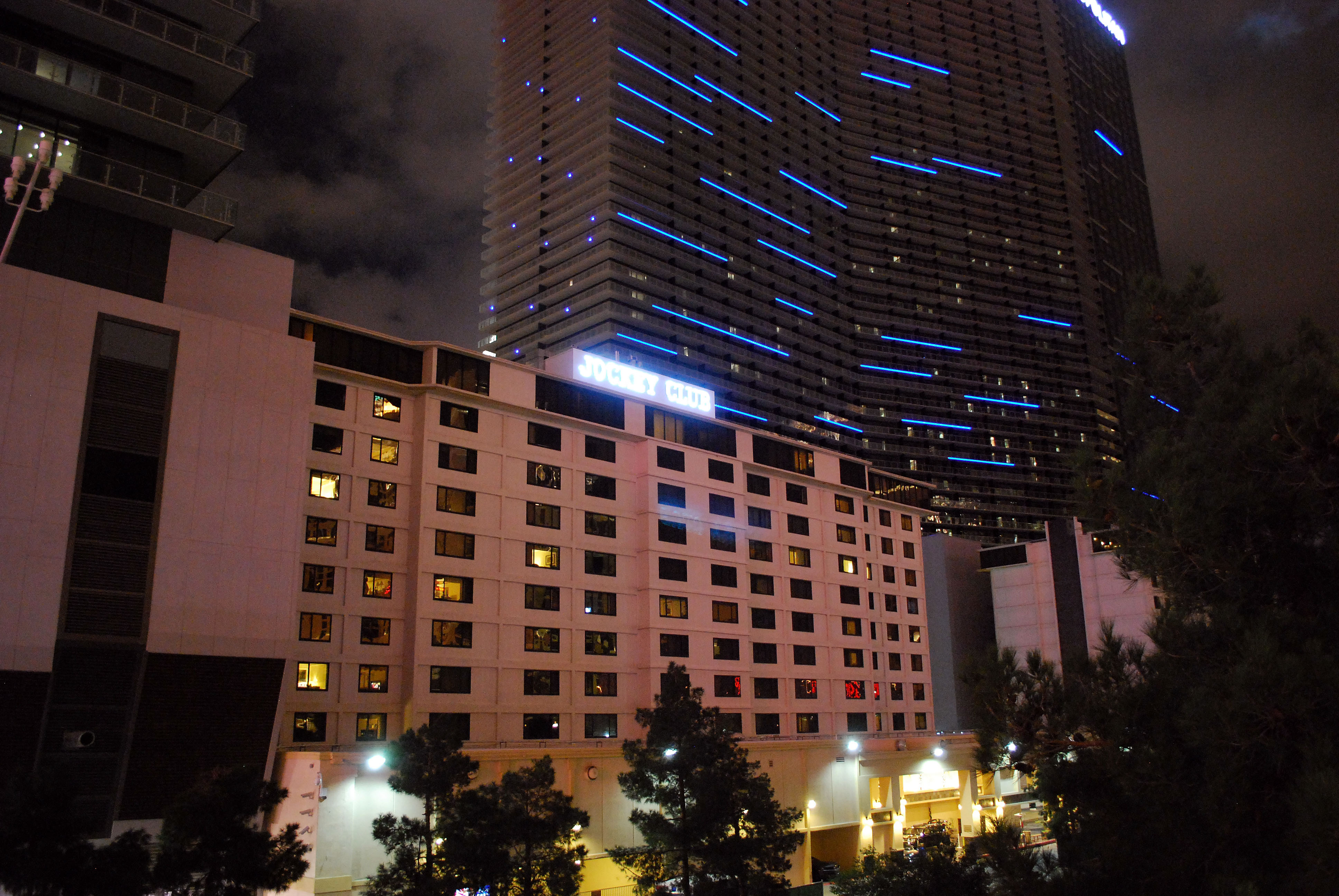
Jockey Club in 2010, with the Cosmopolitan in the background

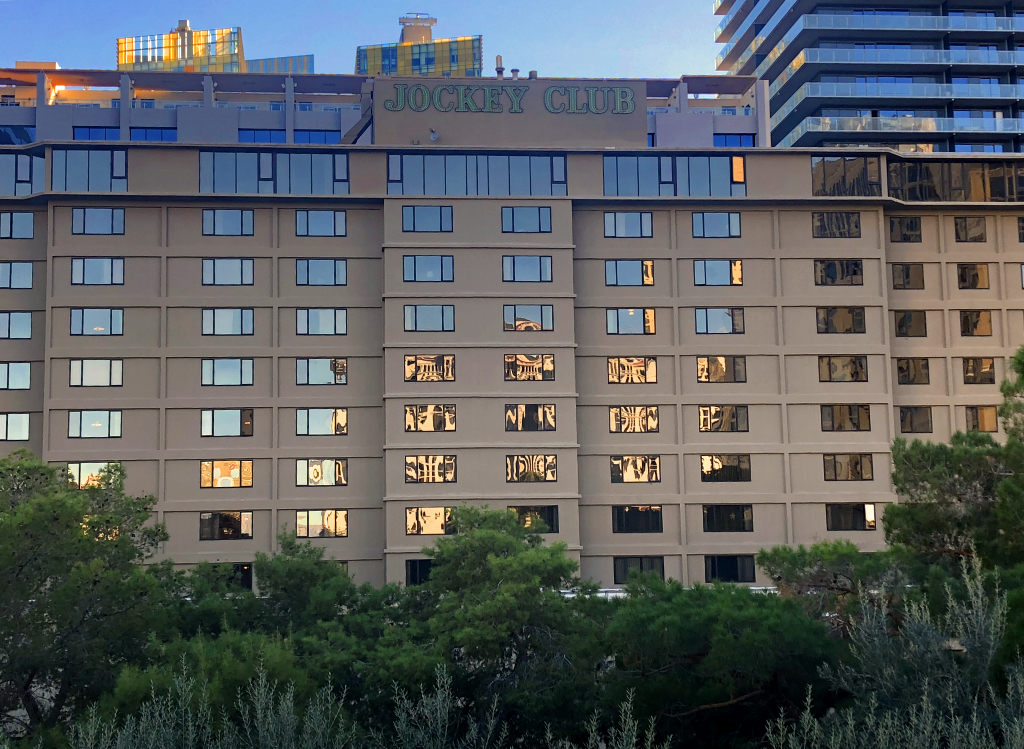
Jockey Club in 2018

The Jockey Club is located on the Strip, surrounded on three sides by the Cosmopolitan of Las Vegas. It consists of two 11-story towers with a total of 348 units. Of those units, 78 are wholly owned as condos, and the remaining 270 are fractionally owned through a timeshare program.

Development of the property began in 1972. Sales were initially sluggish, and most of the units were used as short-term rentals for several years. In 1977, the developers began converting units into timeshares. The timeshare program initially included 85 units, and later expanded to include most of the building. A second phase of construction was originally planned to add a third tower with 650 units on 30 floors, as well as a casino, restaurants, and showrooms. The casino was built in 1981, but never opened; instead, the developer went into bankruptcy, and the land was sold off.

After a series of ownership changes, the land was bought in 2004 by the developers who would build the Cosmopolitan. They decided to build around the Jockey Club instead of attempting to buy and demolish it because of the estimated $400- to $500-million cost of buying out all of the condo and timeshare owners.

=== Juhl ===
Juhl is a mixed-use development project that includes a 15-story condominium tower, in addition to restaurants and retail. It is located in downtown Las Vegas. Construction began in 2006, but the opening was delayed by more than a year, due to construction issues. It ultimately opened in 2009, and buyers initially had trouble finalizing their purchases due to the effects of the Great Recession. Some units were temporarily turned into rentals.

=== Manhattan ===
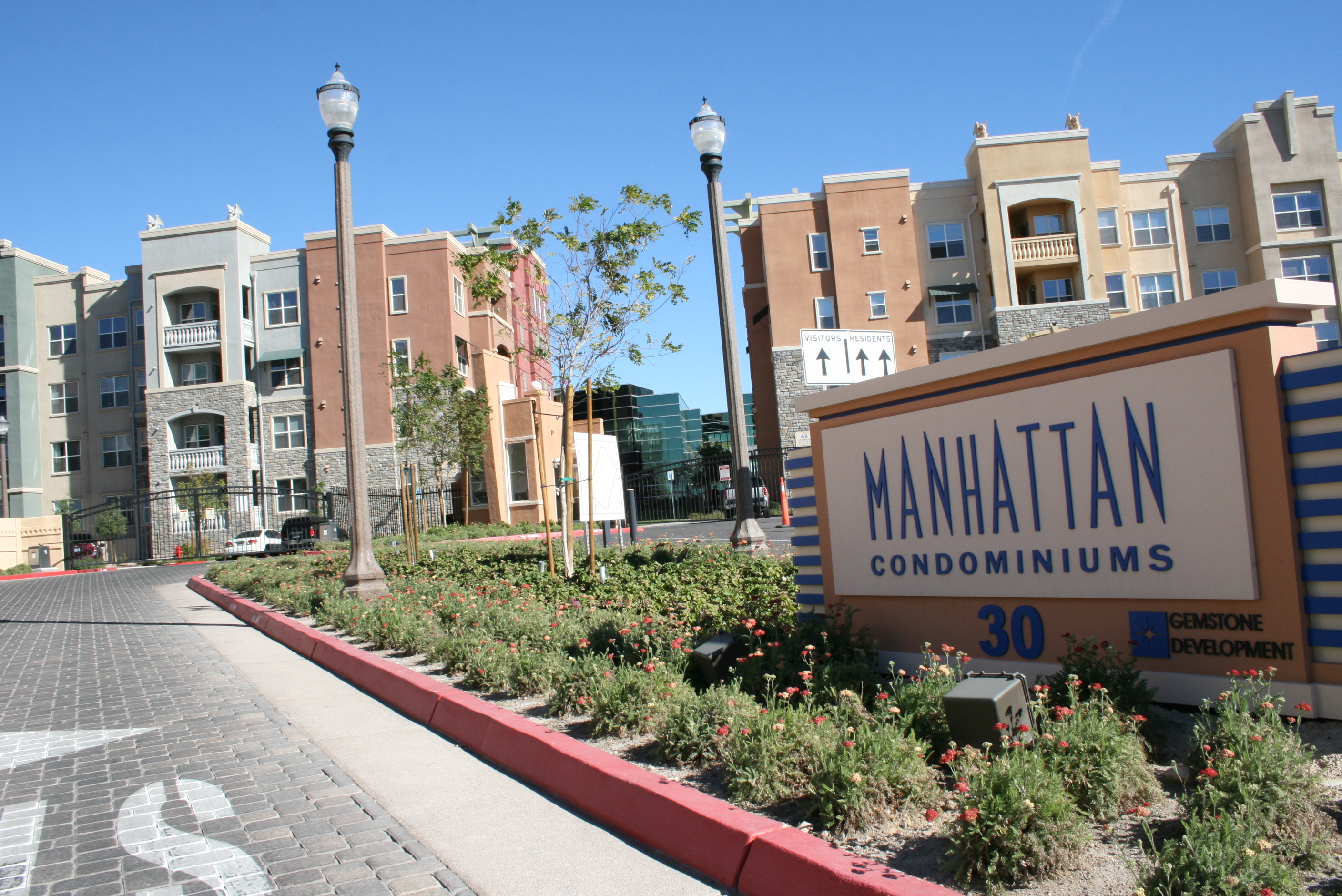
Manhattan condominiums

Manhattan is a 700-unit condominium property located on South Las Vegas Boulevard, south of the Las Vegas Strip. It was announced by Gemstone Development in 2004, and was built by Martin-Harris Construction.

The project cost $250 million, and the first of several buildings was completed in 2006. The building exteriors were designed to resemble the various architectural styles present in the borough of Manhattan. Units were priced low to appeal to a broad customer base.

=== Metropolis ===
Metropolis is a condominium tower with 71 units, located at 360 East Desert Inn Road, east of the Las Vegas Strip. It was built on less than an acre of land, previously occupied by a closed low-rise timeshare known as Royal Aloha.

Metropolis was developed by Randall Davis, who had previously developed other properties in Houston. He was attracted to the Las Vegas market following the success of Park Towers and Turnberry Place. The property is named after Davis' Metropolis condominium property in Houston, but it differs in appearance, featuring a 1920s Art Deco design inspired by the Argyle Hotel in California.

Davis purchased the land in July 2003, at a cost of $1.9 million. He demolished the Royal Aloha and broke ground on Metropolis in September. Construction began in January 2004, and the project was originally scheduled for completion that November. Although concrete and steel prices increased during construction, Davis chose not to raise prices on the units, ultimately breaking even. The tower was topped off in December 2004, and was opened the following December.

=== Newport Lofts ===
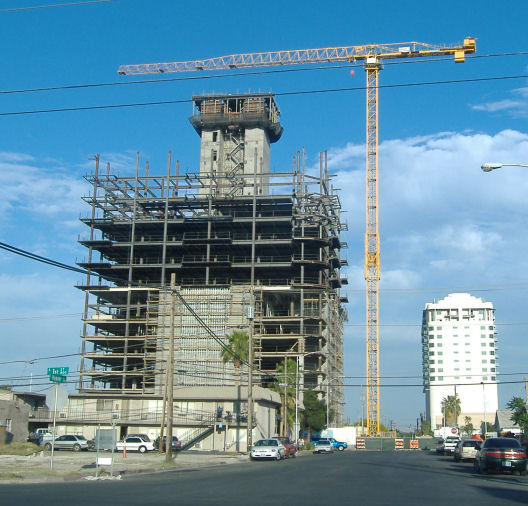
Newport Lofts during construction, May 2006

Newport Lofts is a 23-story, 168-unit tower located at 200 Hoover Street in downtown Las Vegas. The project was co-developed by Sam Cherry, who also developed Soho Lofts. In August 2004, Cherry was planning Newport Lofts as a 17-story tower with 131 units, to be built at the northeast corner of Casino Center and Hoover Avenue. The project was a joint venture between Cherry and Seegmiller Partners, a company based in Newport Beach, California, with Clark and West Seegmiller as its principals. The property for the project had been purchased several years earlier by Clark Seegmiller.

In October 2004, the Las Vegas City Council approved Newport Lofts as a 22-story tower with 168 units. Groundbreaking was to begin in late May 2005, with completion expected in fall 2006. Reservations began in January 2005, while groundbreaking began in early July 2005, with Breslin Builders as the project's general contractor. Completion was expected for 2007. That month, the project received $81 million in construction financing from George Smith Partners, based in Irvine, California. In March 2006, the elevator shaft and center staircase had been built up to the 12th floor, while shear walls were up to the eighth floor.

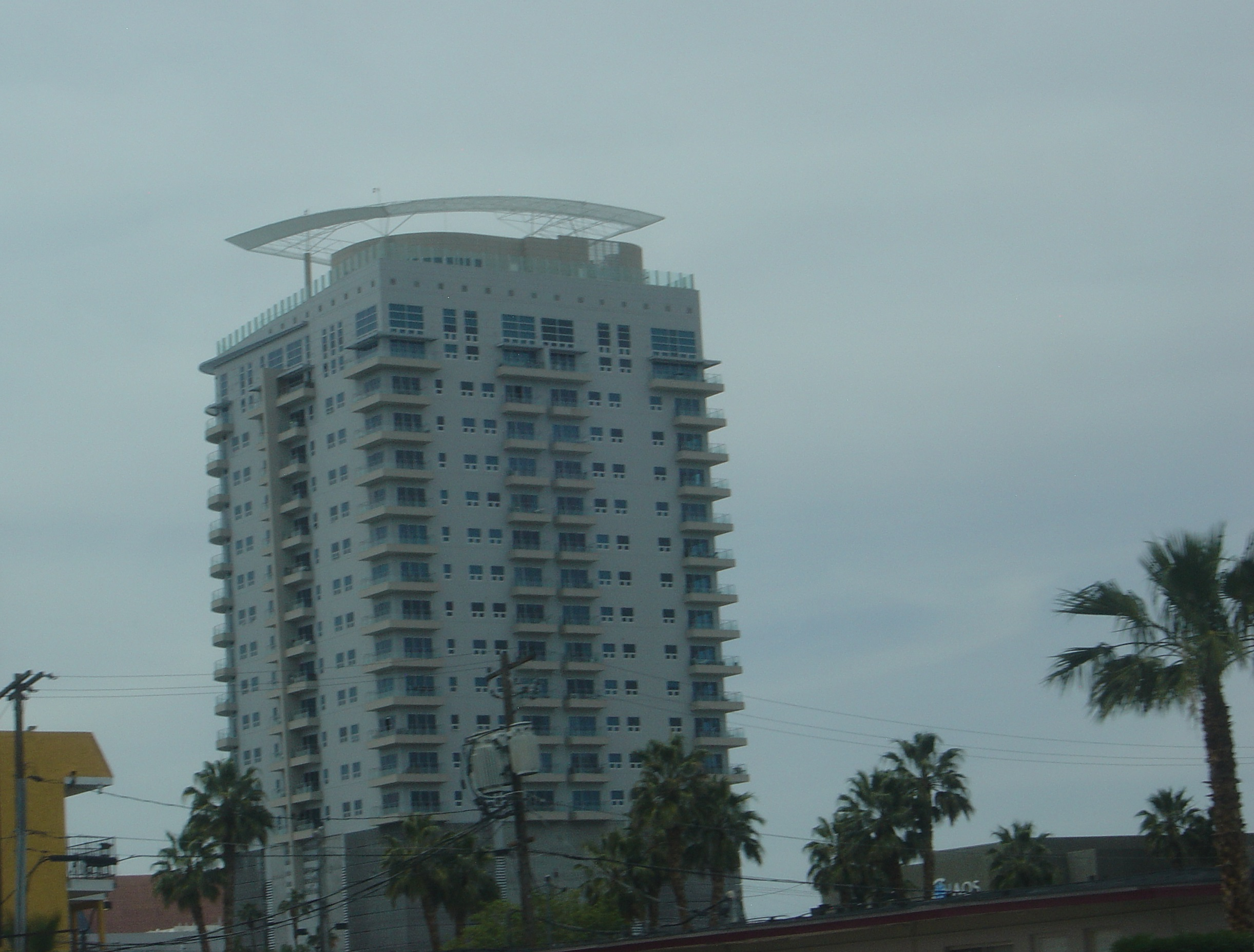
Newport Lofts in 2020

Construction was still underway in August 2007, although some new residents had already begun moving into the building by that time. More than 70 percent of the building's units had been sold up to that point. Construction concluded at a cost of $115 million. Corus Bank helped financed the project for $67.1 million. West Seegmiller said Newport Lofts was designed with a Southern California theme, as its target demographic was California residents who desired to purchase a second home in Las Vegas. In 2007, Newport Lofts won a Mayor's Urban Design Award.

In January 2008, an auction of 60 units was cancelled after Pyramis Global Advisors – a division of Fidelity Investments – took over management of the building. Condo prices at Newport Lofts were decreased 30 percent later that year. At the end of 2008, artist Brett Sperry opened the Brett Wesley Gallery inside his penthouse at Newport Lofts. When Corus Bank failed in September 2009, the property was acquired by ST Residential. In April 2011, ST Residential announced that the last of Newport Lofts' units had been sold to buyers.

=== One Las Vegas ===
One Las Vegas consists of two 20-story towers, located south of the Las Vegas Strip. Construction was underway in 2006, and the project opened in June 2008.

=== One Queensridge Place ===
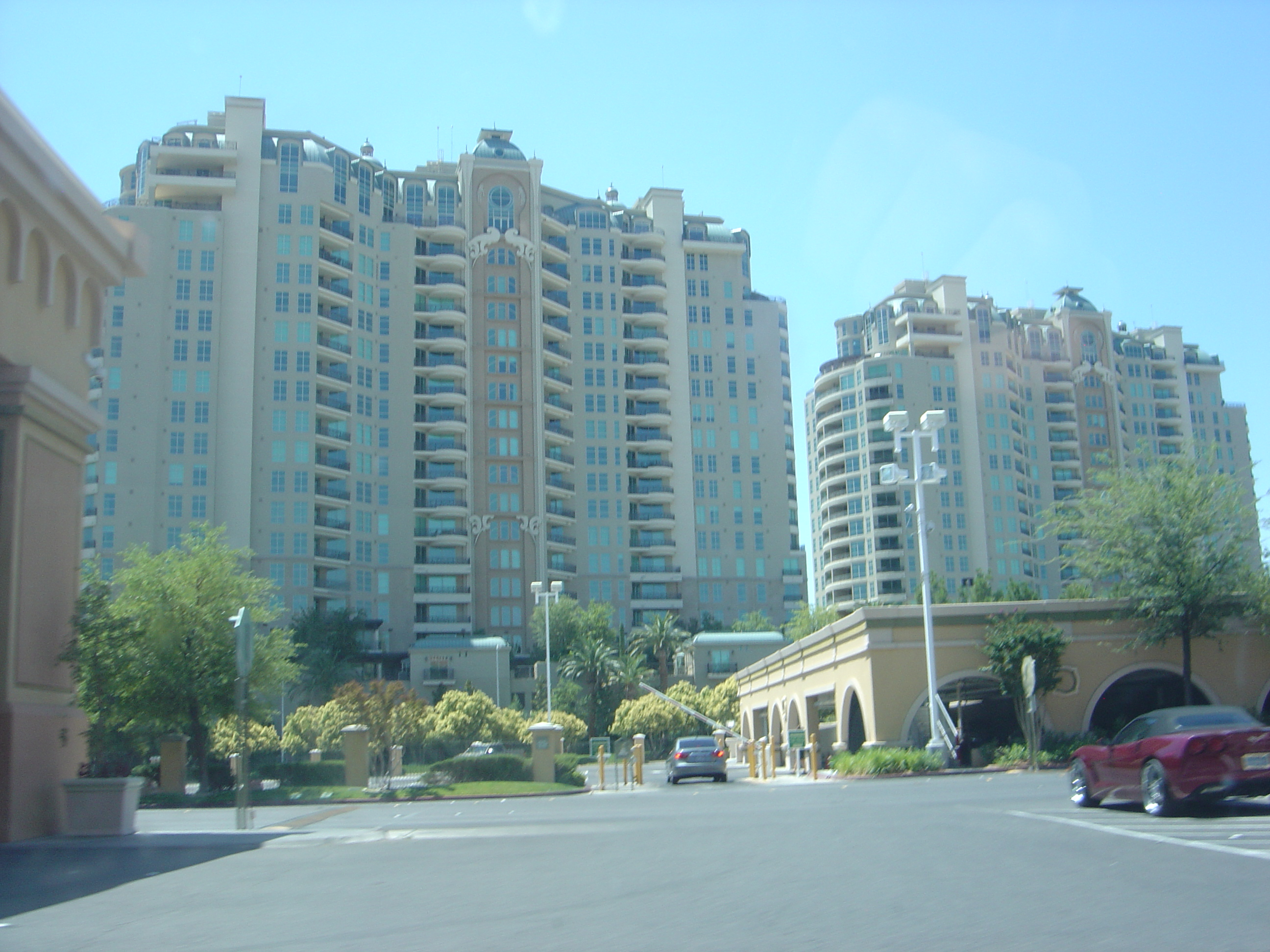
One Queensridge Place in 2011

One Queensridge Place, located in Summerlin, began construction in 2005. The project was finished two years later, at a cost of $400 million. One Queensridge Place consists of two 18-story towers with 219 condominium units, and is located on part of a 20-acre (8.1 ha) property near the Suncoast Hotel and Casino and the Tivoli Village shopping mall.

=== Palms Place ===
Palms Place is a 47-story condo hotel tower with 599 units, located next to the Palms Casino Resort. It began construction in 2006, and was opened in 2008.

=== Panorama Towers ===
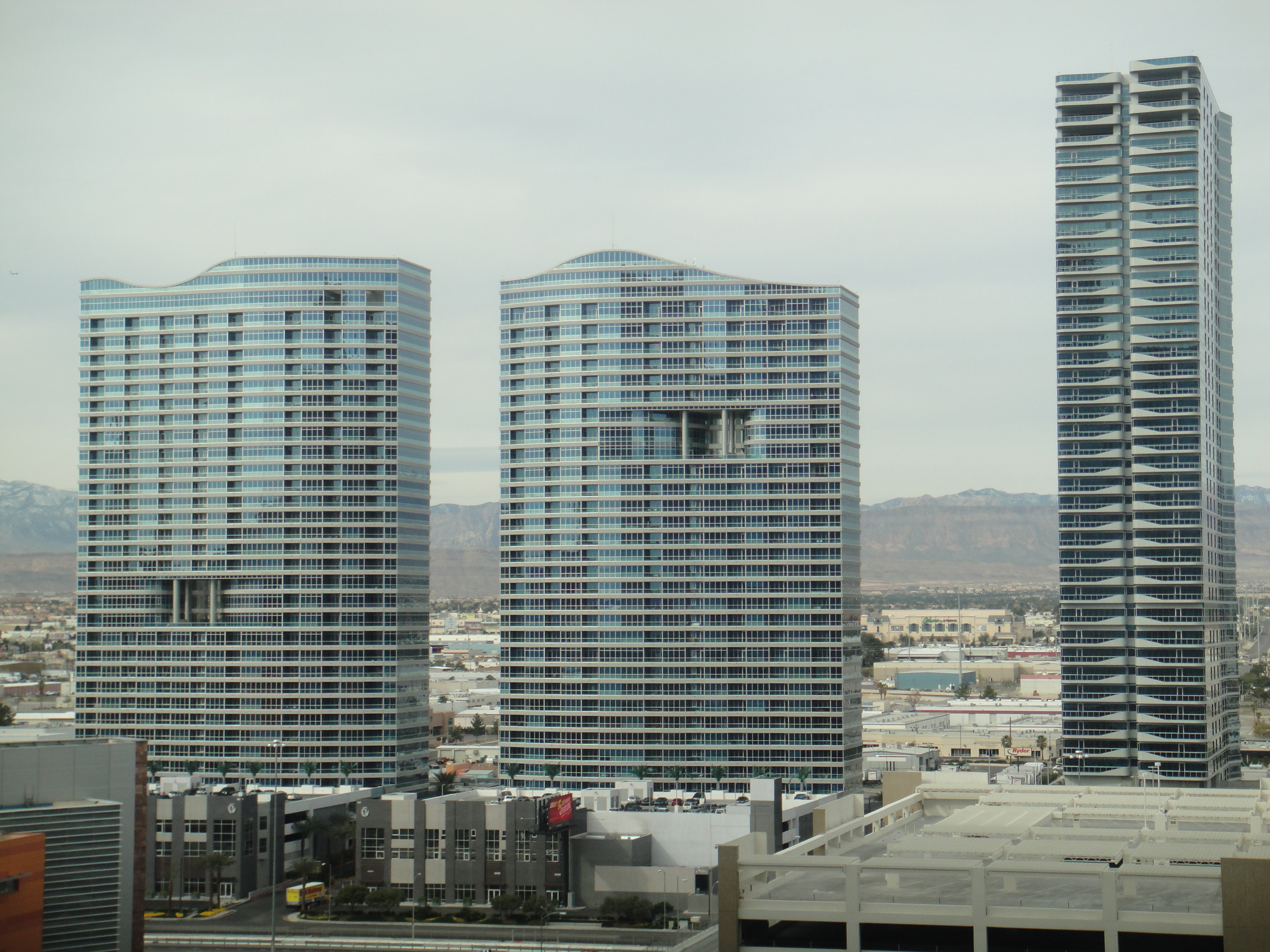
Panorama Towers (left) and The Martin (right)

Panorama Towers was announced in September 2003, and began construction the following year. The first tower was opened in 2006, followed by a second tower in 2007. Both towers stand 33 stories high, and were built at an estimated cost of $300 million. A third tower, standing 45 stories, was renamed as The Martin in 2011, and received a $3 million renovation to increase sales. The complex is located west of Interstate 15 and CityCenter.

=== Park Towers ===
Park Towers is a two-tower, 20-story condominium property with 84 units, located east of the Las Vegas Strip. Park Towers was announced by developer Irwin Molasky in 1998, and began construction the following year, with Steve Wynn as a co-developer. The project was completed in 2001.

=== Regency Towers ===
Regency Towers is located at 3111 Bel Air Drive, at the Las Vegas Country Club in Winchester, Nevada. Regency Towers was built in 1974, and was the first high-rise condominium property to open in the Las Vegas Valley, standing 28 stories with 226 units. Only eight of the units sold after opening, before the property went into foreclosure. Irwin Molasky, who was among the eight buyers, later purchased the entire structure and renovated it before ultimately selling the remaining units. Regency Towers was designed by Las Vegas architect Homer A. Rissman, who also lived at the property for years. In March 2001, approximately 80 residents were evacuated after the explosion of a meth lab operated by a resident inside one of the condominiums. In March 2007, six weeks of filming began at Regency Towers for the second season of the television series HGTV Design Star. The season was shot inside the penthouse formerly owned by Molasky.

Notable tenants at Regency Towers have included George Carlin, Don Miguel Ruiz, Hank Greenspun and his wife, Shaun King, musician Larry Hart, Norm Clarke, casino executive Burton Cohen, Russian-art collector Dr. Rupert Perrin, Sandra Murphy, and Anthony Spilotro. Moe Dalitz owned a penthouse unit until his death there in 1989; his unit, which included his furniture and books, was for sale in 2002 at a cost of $1.2 million. Also for sale at that time was Rodney Dangerfield's 1,856 sq ft (172.4 m^{2}) unit, at a cost of $275,000. Actress Debbie Reynolds, who purchased a 1,856 sq ft (172.4 m^{2}) condominium unit on the 12th floor in 1974, put her unit up for sale in 2011, at a cost of $269,900. La Toya Jackson owned a unit from 1996 until 2009, when it was foreclosed.

=== Sky Las Vegas ===
Sky Las Vegas is a 45-story tower with 409 condominium units that is located on the Las Vegas Strip. Sky Las Vegas was announced in July 2004, and was opened in May 2007, becoming the first high-rise condominium project to be completed on the Las Vegas Strip.

=== Soho Lofts ===
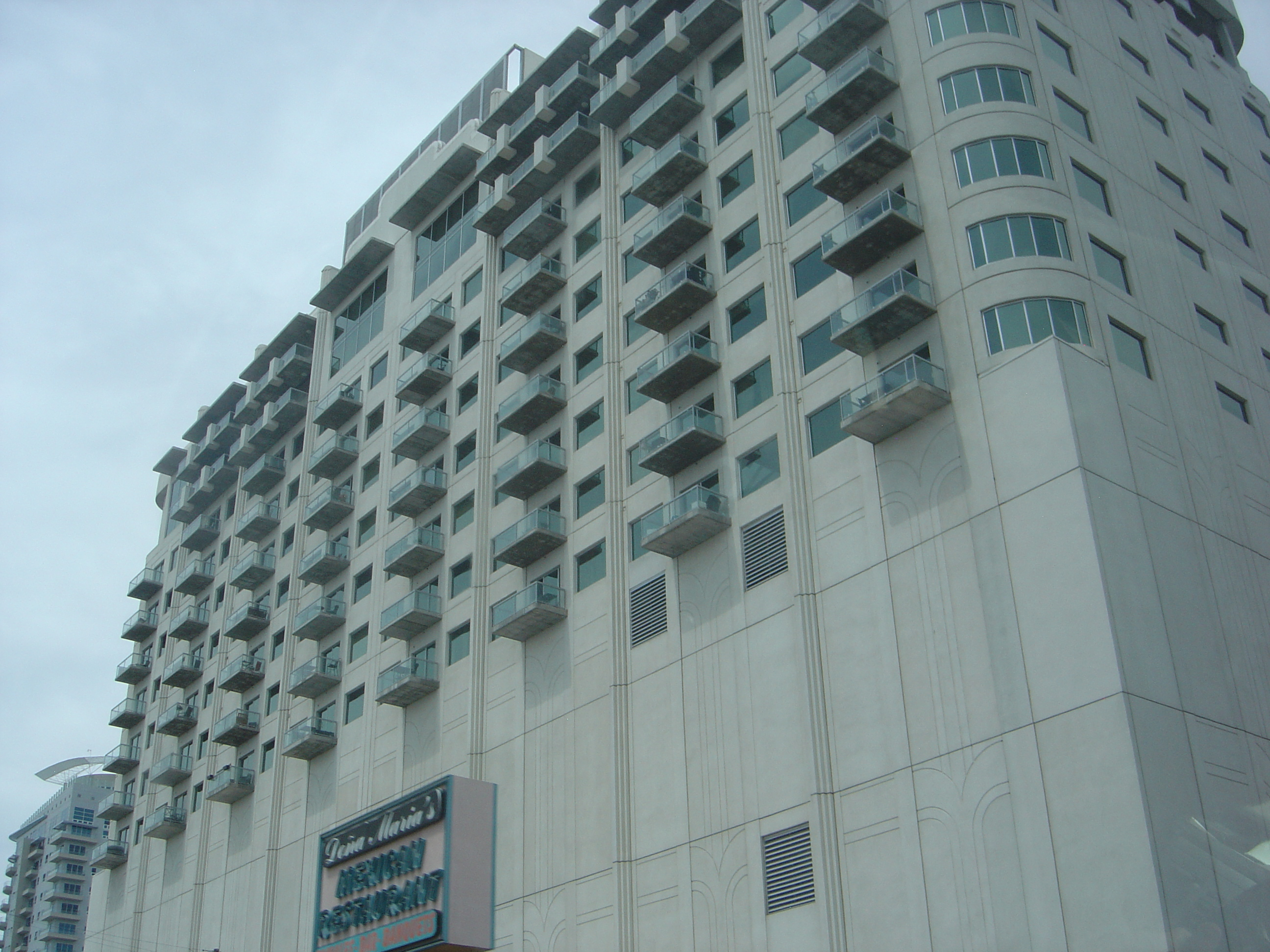
Soho Lofts in 2020

Soho Lofts, named after the Manhattan neighborhood of SoHo, is a 16-story condominium tower with 112 units, located within the city's arts district at 900 South Las Vegas Boulevard in downtown Las Vegas. The project was developed by Sam Cherry, who also developed Newport Lofts. Cherry and his father-in-law, Harris Rittoff, were planning Soho Lofts in December 2003. JMA Architecture Studios designed the project. Soho Lofts was to be built at a cost of $40 million to $50 million, on 0.69 acres (0.28 ha) of vacant property at the southwest corner of South Las Vegas Boulevard and Hoover Avenue. It was the first high-rise condominium project to be announced for the downtown area. Groundbreaking was scheduled for May 2004. The project was to include 4,000 sq ft (370 m^{2}) of ground-level retail space. The property was purchased in January 2004, at a cost of $1.2 million.

The project's general contractor was Breslin Builders. Digging for the building's support columns began in July 2004. Construction was expected to cost $60 million. Crews were preparing to begin the structure's foundation work in October 2004. Occupancy was initially expected for early December 2005. Occupancy was later expected for February 2006, although construction was ongoing in April 2006.

In May 2006, an automobile dealership – for Lamborghinis, Ferraris, and Rolls-Royces – was being planned for the building's ground floor, while residents were expected to begin occupying the building later that month. In December 2007, a lease was signed for the Dust Contemporary Fine Art gallery to occupy a 1,300 sq ft (120 m^{2}) space inside Soho Lofts. The gallery opened two months later. Globe Salon was the first business to occupy Soho Lofts' commercial space, beginning in July 2008; the rest of the space remained vacant because of the poor economy.

By 2009, the Naomi Arin Contemporary Art gallery was operating inside Soho Lofts. In January 2011, a small grocery store, Resnicks Grocery, opened inside a 1,400 sq ft (130 m^{2}) space inside Soho Lofts that was previously occupied by an art gallery. A lounge, known as The Lady Silvia, opened inside Soho Lofts in July 2011. The Amanda Harris Gallery opened inside Soho Lofts in January 2012. The Contemporary Arts Center later operated from within one of Soho Loft's ground-level spaces. As of April 2023, Globe Salon, The Goodwich restaurant (which remodeled the former Resnicks Grocery space), and Millenium Fandom bar (which took over the former Lady Silvia bar) were all operating in Soho Lofts, which is within the Downtown Las Vegas Arts District.

=== The Ogden ===
The Ogden, located in downtown Las Vegas, was initially opened as the Streamline Tower in May 2008. It opened with 275 condominium units in a 21-story tower, although sales suffered as a result of the weak local and national economy. The units were converted into apartments in 2010, and the property was renamed as The Ogden a year later. In 2014, The Ogden was converted back into condominiums.

=== The Platinum ===
The Platinum is a 17-story, 255-unit condo hotel built on 1.7 acres (0.69 ha) of land, east of the Las Vegas Strip. The project was developed by Platinum Condominium Development, LLC, a joint venture of Diversified Real Estate Concepts, Inc. and Marcus Hotels and Resorts. Construction began in 2005, and the project opened in October 2006.

=== The Signature at MGM Grand ===
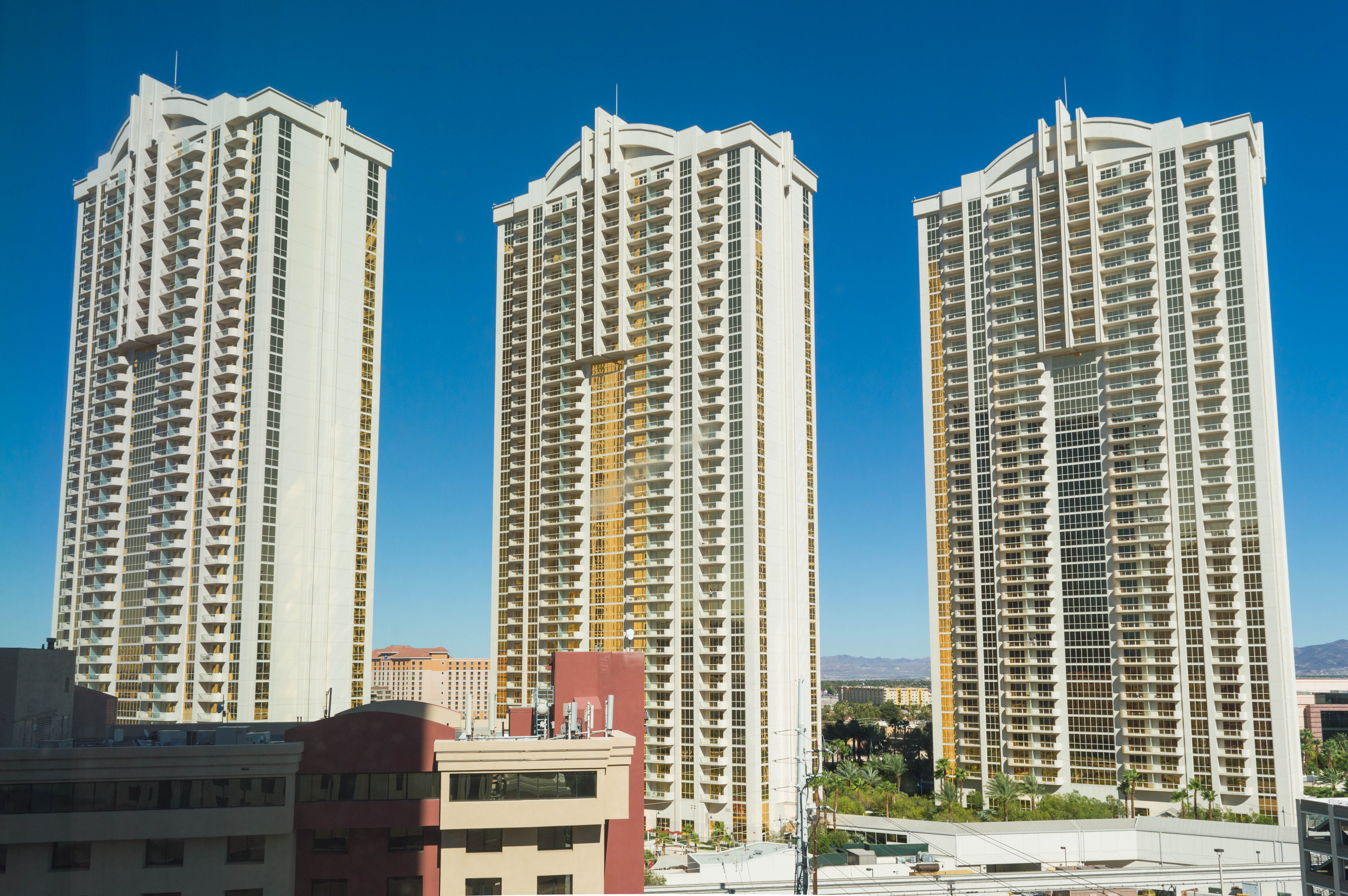
The Signature in 2015

The Signature is a condo hotel located near the MGM Grand Las Vegas resort. The project was jointly developed by MGM Mirage and Turnberry Associates, and opened in 2006, on the former land of MGM Grand Adventures Theme Park.

=== Trump International ===
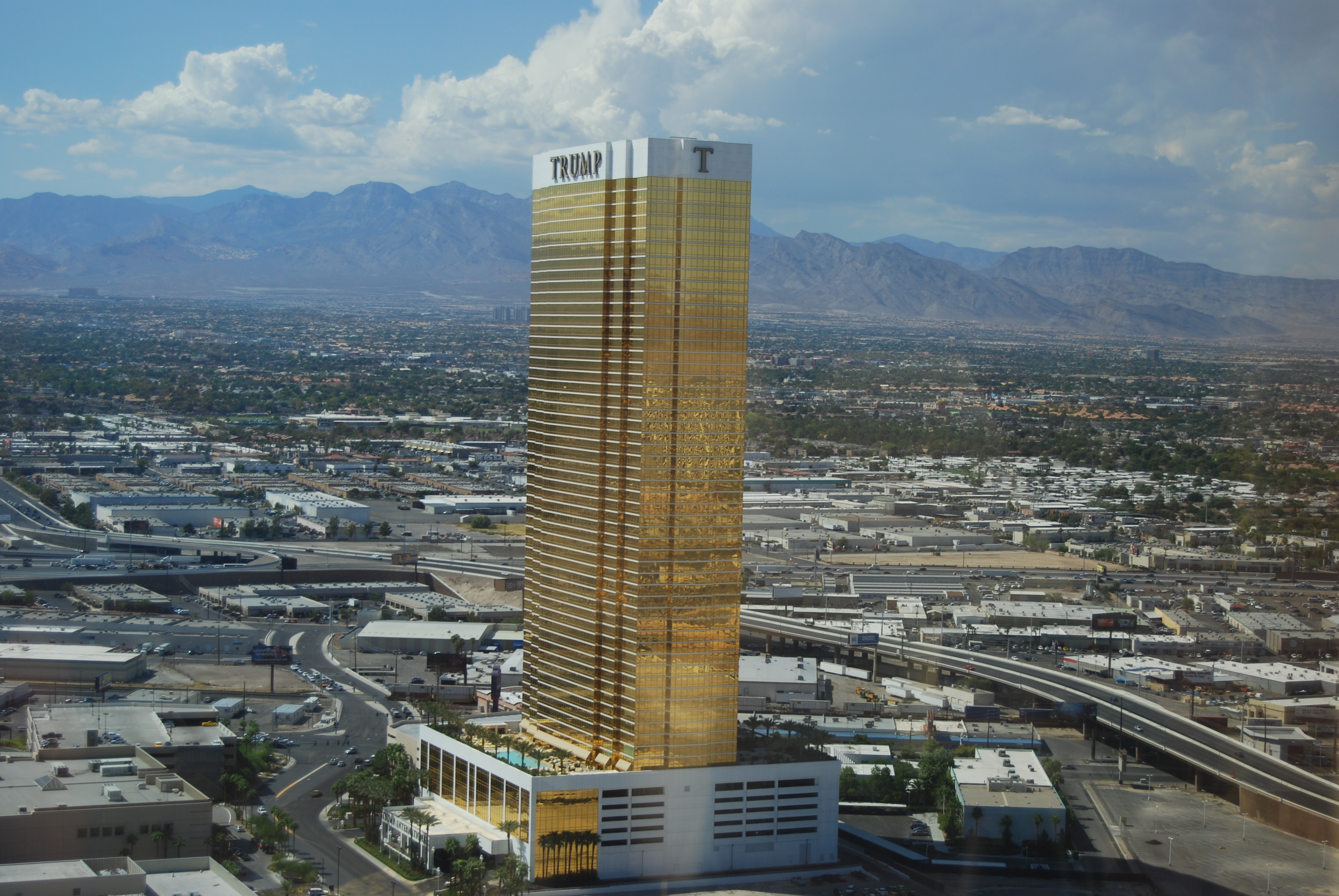
Trump International in 2008

Trump International is located near the Las Vegas Strip. Groundbreaking took place in 2005. The 64-floor tower was built on 3 acres (1.2 ha) of property that had been used as part of the Frontier's rear parking lot. The project cost $500 million, and was opened in 2008, with a total of 1,282 condominium units and hotel rooms. A second tower had been planned, but was postponed due to poor economic conditions. Construction of the second tower had been expected to begin in late 2008.

=== Turnberry Place ===
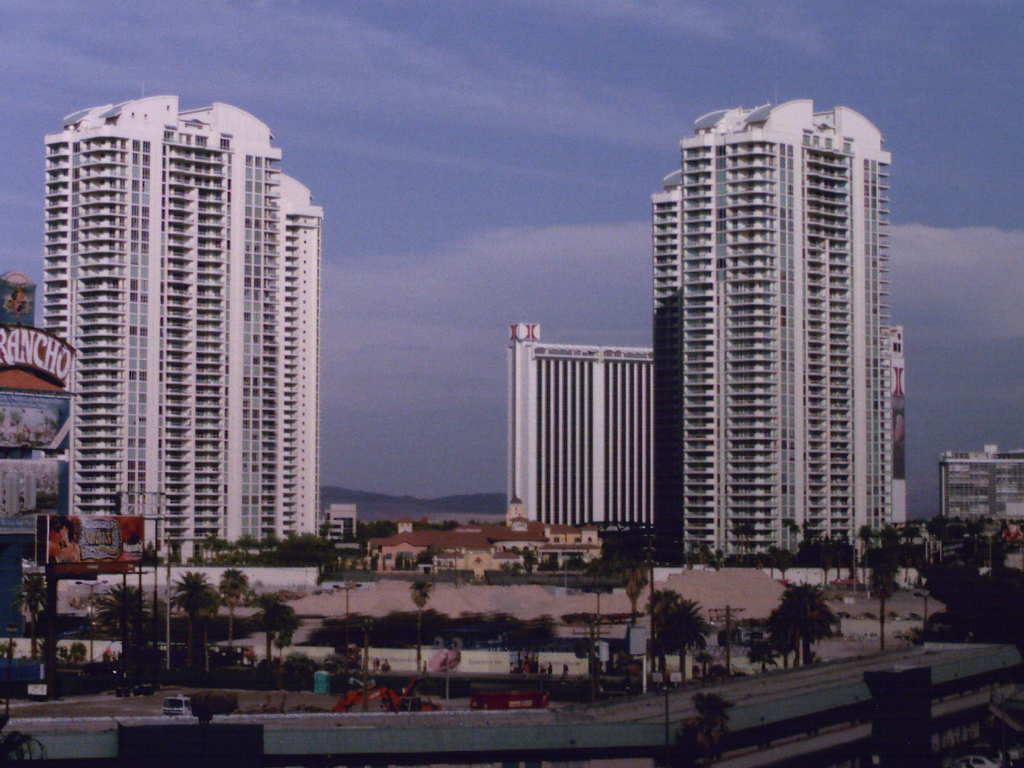
Turnberry Place in 2006

Turnberry Place was announced in June 1998, and consists of four 40-story condominium towers located east of the Las Vegas Strip.

=== Turnberry Towers ===
Turnberry Towers is a two-tower property near the Las Vegas Strip. The towers stand 45 stories and contain a total of 636 units.

=== Vdara ===
Vdara is a condo hotel located within CityCenter on the Las Vegas Strip. It opened in December 2009, and includes 1,495 units.

=== Veer Towers ===
Veer Towers, also located within CityCenter, consists of twin towers that stand 37 stories high and include 670 condominium units. The towers opened in July 2010.

=== Waldorf Astoria Las Vegas ===
The Waldorf Astoria hotel includes 225 condominiums and is located within CityCenter. It was opened in December 2009 as the Mandarin Oriental, and rebranded as the Waldorf Astoria in 2018.

== Under construction projects ==
=== Four Seasons ===
Four Seasons Private Residences Las Vegas is a $1 billion condominium project. It is being constructed on 11 acres in the community of MacDonald Highlands, located within the city of Henderson, itself a part of the Las Vegas Valley. The project will include 171 units, spread across two towers rising 24 and 25 stories. It will be the first high-rise structure in Henderson, and the first new condominium high-rise in the Las Vegas Valley since Veer Towers, finished in 2010.

The project was announced in November 2021, by Azure Resorts and Luxus Developments, and was originally known as Pinnacle Residences at MacDonald Highlands. It was conceived by Azure founder Jim Reilly, a resident of nearby Seven Hills who had become personally interested in high-rise living. He soon found that there was demand for a high-rise condominium property in Henderson. In 2023, a branding and management deal was announced with Four Seasons Hotels. Site preparation began that year, and construction is expected to conclude by 2026. As of 2025, move-ins are expected in 2027 with a majority of units already sold.

== On hold ==
=== St. Regis Residences ===
An unfinished condominium tower, known as "The St. Regis Residences at the Venetian Palazzo, Las Vegas", is located on the Las Vegas Strip, between the Palazzo and Venetian resorts. Construction was underway in 2007, and the opening was eventually scheduled for March 2010. The tower was to stand 50 stories, with a total of 398 condominium units. The project was expected to cost $600 million, but construction was indefinitely suspended in November 2008 because of the Great Recession. In 2014, the project was no longer expected to be finished as a condominium tower because of uncertainty in the high-end, high-rise residential market. Up to that point, several other options had been considered regarding the building's future use.

== Cancelled projects ==
=== Ambling Development Company project ===
In 2004, the Atlanta-based Ambling Development Company held meetings with mayor Oscar Goodman, councilman Lawrence Weekly, and other city officials regarding a condominium project. Ambling was planning a complex of three 28-story condominium towers with a total of 840 units, to be built at a cost of $330 million on 16.8 acres (6.8 ha) at the northwest corner of Alta Drive and South Martin Luther King Boulevard. The land had previously been occupied by a gas station, which was later burned down during a riot.

Ambling invested $2 million to acquire the land, to open a Las Vegas office, and to perform initial design work. Months later, on December 15, 2004, the City Council voted unanimously to reject Ambling's project because of opposition from nearby residents, who believed that the tall modern-style glass buildings would not go well with the neighborhood's southwestern theme and its 600 single-story houses. Residents also believed the new project would create traffic problems and overcrowd nearby schools. Weekly criticized city staff members, alleging that they misled Ambling to believe that their project was guaranteed to be approved by the City Council. The manager of the city's Economic Development division, who had worked with Ambling on their project, resigned from his position two days after the vote.

In June 2005, Ambling was unanimously approved by the City Council for a smaller version of its initial project to be constructed on the same property. The new project was to consist of three nine-story buildings and one five-story building, with retail space and a total of 664 condominium units. The project was to be built in phases, with construction planned to begin at the end of 2005, and the first phase being potentially completed in 2007. The project was ultimately cancelled due to further opposition from nearby residents. The land was subsequently sold in February 2006.

=== Aqua Blue ===
By December 2004, the newly created high-rise development division of Prudential Americana Group Realtors was planning Aqua Blue, a luxury condominium-hotel project. Aqua Blue was the division's flagship project, with gross sales expected to exceed $550 million. The project was approved that year, and was to be constructed east of the Las Vegas Strip near the intersection of Flamingo Road and Koval Lane, on 3.6 acres (1.5 ha) of property that was occupied at the time by a Super 8 motel, located adjacent to the Ellis Island Casino & Brewery. The motel was to be demolished to make room for Aqua Blue, while Ellis Island would continue operations but would receive an exterior renovation to match the appearance of the new project.

Aqua Blue would have included a 12,000 sq ft (1,100 m^{2}) casino that would be operated by Gary Ellis, who owned the Ellis Island. Ellis decided to become involved in the Aqua Blue after meeting with the project's developer, Michael Peterson, who had developed and owned condominiums and restaurants in Wisconsin and Chicago. Aqua Blue was to stand 46 stories, and would have included 825 units, priced between $399,000 and $1,125,000. The project's expected cost was $600 million. Construction was expected to begin in fall 2005, and its opening was expected to occur by fall 2007.

In January 2005, retired basketball player Michael Jordan became involved in Aqua Blue. Jordan was to open two restaurants at Aqua Blue: Michael Jordon's Steak House and Michael Jordon's 23 Sportcafe. Jordan would also open the 65,000 sq ft (6,000 m^{2}) Michael Jordan Athletic Center inside the new building. In June 2005, Peterson began considering offers for the property. After three weeks, Peterson announced on June 29, 2005, that the project had been cancelled due to a large increase of proposed nearby condominium projects and a lack of buyers to sustain the increase. The property was sold to David Schwartz and his Chicago-based company, Waterton Associates, with plans to keep the Super 8 motel operational.

=== Champions of Las Vegas ===
Champions of Las Vegas was to consist of a 21-story tower with 844 condominium units that would be priced at approximately $1 million each. The project was being planned in 1995, and by March 1998, it had received approval by the Clark County Commission. The project was to be located near the southern entrance to Red Rock Canyon National Conservation Area. As of 1998, the project was scheduled for completion in 2006, because of the necessity to perform extensive infrastructure work on the property.

=== Charlie Palmer Hotel ===
The Charlie Palmer Hotel was announced by chef Charlie Palmer in April 2006. The project was to include a 35-story boutique condo hotel with 400 to 500 rooms, and initially was to be built at the intersection of Tropicana Avenue and Dean Martin Drive. The $400 million project was scheduled to break ground later in 2006, with completion expected for mid-2008. The project's proposed location was later changed to Symphony Park in downtown Las Vegas, with the condominium aspect removed.

=== Cielo Vista ===
In March 2005, the Seattle-based Northwest Resource Management Group filed plans with the city of Las Vegas for Cielo Vista, a 25-story condominium tower with 414 units, as well as 32,000 sq ft (3,000 m^{2}) of commercial space on the first floor. Above the first floor would be six floors used for parking, and 18 floors for condominium units. The project was designed by Las Vegas-based MWT Ofra, and was scheduled for a vote by the Las Vegas Planning Commission and the City Council in May and June 2005, respectively.

Cielo Vista would have been the company's first Las Vegas project. The company had previously developed single-family residential homes in California, as well as an 11-story building in Seattle. Cielo Vista was to be built at the southeast corner of East Washington Avenue and Veterans Memorial Drive, west of Cashman Field and north of downtown Las Vegas, on a 2.8-acre site that the company purchased for $1.2 million on March 29, 2005. A local expert believed that the project was in a bad location: an older part of Las Vegas with little development. The area was also known for a high rate of crime and homelessness; Steve Hartley, a partner for Northwest Resource Management Group, said the company had previously developed a project in California that had similar demographics.

The low price of the land allowed the company to sell condominium units ranging from 1,000 sq ft (93 m^{2}) to 2,000 sq ft (190 m^{2}) at a starting price of $295,000, and exceeding $500,000. Condominium units in the project could be reserved for a refundable fee of $5,000, compared to a $25,000 fee that was being charged by some other high-rise condominium projects in the city. Construction was expected to begin in late 2005, as long as the project received approval from the city. Completion was expected by early 2007. The project received unanimous approval from the Las Vegas Planning Commission in June 2005. At the time, 155 units had been reserved.

Three months after the announcement of Cielo Vista, Northwest Resource suspended sales and delayed the project because of rising construction costs, choosing instead to wait until it was further along in the construction cost process before beginning sales; 300 units had been reserved up to that point, and some buyers received a refund. As final construction costs were being determined in March 2006, Eric Radovich, Northwest Resource's managing director of public relations and marketing, said, "We're getting close to a number and we think it's real. We didn't feel we could tell people truthfully what the product was going to cost and whether we can afford to build it." The project never materialized.

=== Club Renaissance ===
The Club Renaissance was announced in 2005, and would have been built in downtown Las Vegas. It would consist of a 60-story tower, and was planned as the least-expensive high-rise condominium in the Las Vegas Valley. The tower, expected to be 702 feet high, was one of the taller high-rise projects to be approved for the downtown area. The project was affected by rising construction costs, and it ultimately did not materialize.

=== Elysium ===
By 2008, ex-NBA player Jackie Robinson and real estate veteran Michael Bellon had teamed up to develop a multibillion-dollar project on Bulloch and Gaffin's property called Elysium. It called for condos and hotel rooms, a dome-covered ocean-beach swimming complex, and more. It was to be located on the southeast of the Las Vegas Strip.

=== Icon ===
In November 2004, Jorge M. Pérez and The Related Companies were planning Icon, a twin-tower condominium project to be built on 4.5 acres (1.8 ha) of property, located on the Las Vegas Strip at the northeast corner of Convention Center Drive. The land was located east of a Ross department store, and the project would be built behind the store. Related purchased the vacant land in January 2004, at a cost of $15 million. The land had previously been owned by Luke Brugnara, who also owned the adjacent Silver City Casino. Initially, Icon was to include two 47-story towers, standing 500 feet, with a total of 502 luxury condominiums, all facing the Las Vegas Strip. Two-thirds of the project's units would include views on both sides of the buildings for views of the Las Vegas Strip and nearby mountains. Unit prices would start at $500,000. The $30 million project was designed by Bernardo Fort Brescia of Arquitectonica, which teamed up with interior designer Yabu Pushelberg for the project. Construction on the first tower was to begin in 2005, with work on the second tower scheduled to begin after the first was completed.

By April 2005, the project had been redesigned after Lorenzo Doumani, developer of the adjacent Majestic Las Vegas, raised concerns about the Icon blocking views for tenants at the Majestic, among other issues. By that time, M.J. Dean had signed on as the general contractor for Icon, and the first tower was expected to take 18 to 24 months to construct. At that point, the towers were expected to be 48 stories high, with a total of 514 units. The Clark County Commission approved Icon in April 2005, despite objections from Doumani, who then filed lawsuits against Related. Later that month, a lawsuit was filed against Related by Sasson Hallier Properties LLC, developer of Panorama Towers. The two companies had previously negotiated a possible joint venture for the Panorama Towers project, and Sasson Hallier provided various database information – including contracts, financials, and marketing information – to Related as part of the negotiations. Ultimately, negotiations failed, and Sasson Hallier alleged that Related kept the database information to develop its Icon project.

In January 2006, Related announced the cancellation of Icon despite that buyers had signed contracts for most of the project's 514 units. Related stated, "In the several months needed to resolve lawsuits and finally be in a position to break ground, construction prices had increased so drastically that after pursuing every possible way to move forward, Related was unable to build Icon based on original pricing without seriously impacting the integrity of the development." A decrease in high-rise sales was also a factor in the cancellation. In May 2006, a lawsuit was filed by buyers against Related, stating that the company had no right to cancel purchase agreements for Icon's units.

=== Krystle Sands ===
Krystle Sands would have featured a 45-story condo hotel, to be built on the Las Vegas Strip. Construction was to begin in 2004, but developer F.W. "Freddie" Schinz eventually sold the land to Turnberry Associates, which used the site for part of its Fontainebleau resort.

=== Las Ramblas ===
Las Ramblas was announced in 2005, as a joint project between Centra Properties and The Related Companies. The $3 billion project was planned as a 25-acre (10 ha) mixed-use complex that would have included 11 high-rise buildings, which would be used for hotel rooms and condominiums, with a total of 4,400 units. Las Ramblas was to be built east of the Las Vegas Strip on Harmon Avenue. Later in 2005, actor George Clooney and nightclub developer Rande Gerber announced that they would invest in the project. Because of a declining market and rising construction costs, Las Ramblas was cancelled in 2006, before the start of construction.

=== Las Vegas Plaza ===
Las Vegas Plaza was planned as a multibillion-dollar resort on the site of the demolished New Frontier hotel and casino. The project was to include 2,600 condominium units. The project never materialized, and in 2014, the property was sold to Crown Resorts, which planned to build the Alon Las Vegas on the site.

=== Liberty Tower / Monument / Stratorise ===
Liberty Tower was announced in June 2004, as a 21-story building to be built on 0.68 acres (0.28 ha) at 1801 South Las Vegas Boulevard, at the southern end of downtown Las Vegas. The project would be located north of the Stratosphere tower and near the Las Vegas Arts District, on land that was purchased for $900,000. The project was designed by JMA Architecture Studios and was to be developed by Harvard Securities of Australia. Groundbreaking was expected by November 2004, with completion occurring a year and a half later at a cost of $35 million.

In August 2004, the 21-story project was approved by the Las Vegas City Council to include 18 condominium units, 116 apartments, and 2,200 sq ft (200 m^{2}) of ground-level retail space. That month, it was announced that Australian developers Joseph Di Mauro and Victor Altomare would finance the project, which they also planned to do for The Summit. By January 2005, the closed Holy Cow Casino and Brewery (the planned future site of The Summit) had been converted into a $1 million sales office for Liberty Tower. At that time, construction on the project was expected to begin in July 2005, with a cost of $100 million.

Construction of Liberty Tower never began. In December 2005, Altomare sold the property for $5.5 million to Stratorise South, a limited liability company based in Nevada. That month, plans were announced for a $105 million condominium project called Monument to be built on the property. The project was to be 22 stories, with 236 units, and was to be developed by Constellation Property Group, an Australia-based company owned by Eugene Marchese, with financing by partner David Rifkind. By August 2006, a new project known as Stratorise was being planned for the property. The project would stand 517 feet, and would include 45 stories. In September 2006, a hearing on the proposed project was delayed until November 1, 2006, at the request of the owner.

=== Majestic Las Vegas ===
Majestic Las Vegas was announced in 2004, and was to be built on the property occupied by the La Concha Motel on the Las Vegas Strip. Majestic Las Vegas initially was to consist of a 42-story tower, although the project later went through several redesigns, before being cancelled in 2007.

=== ManhattanWest ===
ManhattanWest was a mixed-use project that was to include 700 condominium units upon completion. It was proposed by Gemstone Development, which also created the Manhattan project. Construction was suspended in 2008, because of financial problems, and the project was ultimately finished as The Gramercy, with the condominium units opening as apartment rentals instead.

=== One Las Vegas / Vegas 888 ===
In August 2004, Chris DelGuidice, who was developing Vegas Grand through his Del American company, announced plans for a second project to be known as One Las Vegas. The project would include a 565-foot 50-story condominium tower with 542 units, to be built at a cost of $500 million on 10 acres of land on Flamingo Road, east of the Palms Casino Resort. DelGuidice negotiated for a year and a half to purchase the property.

Early design plans included a 400-foot waterfall, rooftop hot tubs, a dance floor, a gourmet grocer, restaurants, a 20,000 sq ft (1,900 m^{2}) pool with cabanas, a 15,000 sq ft (1,400 m^{2}) health spa on the 35th floor, valet and housekeeping services, 24-hour concierge, a pet park, and a business center. Sales were expected to begin in early 2005, with prices starting at $500,000 and exceeding $10 million. Groundbreaking was reported to be a year away. The following month, construction was scheduled to begin in summer 2005. The project was to be financed by Lehman Brothers, with a loan of up to $79.45 million. Lehman Brothers also financed Vegas Grand.

Del American closed escrow on the property in January 2005, at a cost of $50 million. In February 2005, Amland Development took legal action against Del American to continue using the name for its own condominium project, also known as One Las Vegas. Amland Development won the right to use the name. In November 2005, Del American announced that the project would be named Vegas 888. The sales office for Vegas 888 closed in July 2006, at which point the property was reportedly for sale. Approximately $250 million worth of condominium units had been presold, with approximately $75 million spent on the project, most of which came from Lehman Brothers. In August 2006, Del American announced intentions to instead build a mixed-use resort, hotel and casino on the property.

The new project remained un-built. In 2007, the property was foreclosed and acquired by Lehman Brothers. Christopher Beavor, a Las Vegas investor, purchased the property in 2016, at a cost of $13.5 million. Beavor's initial, unfinalized plans included retail space, a five-story apartment complex, and a hotel, with construction expected to begin in six to seven months. Ultimately, Beavor decided to build a Delta hotel on the property. Groundbreaking took place in 2019, with a scheduled opening in 2021.

=== Opus Las Vegas / unnamed mixed-use project ===
The Opus Las Vegas was approved in November 2004, and was announced on March 25, 2005, at a conference that was related to high-rise development and was held at the Bellagio resort on the Las Vegas Strip. The $550 million project would have consisted of two 50-story towers with 350 condominium units each, for a total of 700. The project, to be developed by The Congress Group of Boston, was planned for a 4.4 acres (1.8 ha) property that was presently occupied by the city's Scandia Family Fun Center, located west of the Las Vegas Strip at 2900 Sirius Avenue. Up to that point, The Congress Group had spent a year determining construction costs. Scandia and The Congress Group agreed to delay the initial escrow closing date of May 2005, so that final costs for the new project could be completed. As part of the agreement, the Scandia fun center would remain open through the summer, its busiest period, before its scheduled closing date on September 6, 2005.

At the time of the announcement, the property was in the process of being sold by Highrise Partners to The Congress Group for an undisclosed amount of money, with escrow expected to close in September 2005. Groundbreaking was expected to occur in the first quarter of 2006, with the first units available for occupancy in spring 2008. Opus Las Vegas would have featured 1,400 parking spaces spread across four levels, along with 20,000 sq ft (1,900 m^{2}) of residential retail stores. A 3 acres (1.2 ha) pool would be located on the property's six-story deck. Floor plans would have ranged from 800 sq ft (74 m^{2}) 4,200 sq ft (390 m^{2}), and would have come in one-, two-, and three-bedroom designs, while the top two floors would be occupied by two-story penthouses. Prices would have ranged from $200,000 to more than $4 million. Developer Michael Jabara said the project would offer "a metropolitan lifestyle for people who really want it all, great views, easy access to nearby neighborhood amenities, but at the same time it's an urban project."

In June 2005, Scandia said their fun center would remain open as the property had not been sold. On September 7, 2005, Fisher Brothers purchased the property occupied by Scandia, as well as nearby land. In December 2006, Station Casinos and Fisher Brothers announced a joint venture to develop a mixed-use project on up to 52 acres (21 ha) of land, including the property of the closed Scandia fun center, which was demolished in 2007. As of July 2007, the mixed-use project was to be developed on nearly 90 acres (36 ha) of land, which had been zoned for several thousand high-rise condominium or hotel units, and would have connected to Station's nearby Palace Station resort. Details about the new project's construction and costs were still undetermined at that time. In 2011, a business named Dig This opened on the vacant property, allowing customers to take control of an excavator on the dirt lot.

=== Paramount Las Vegas ===
Paramount Las Vegas was a casino, hotel, and condo resort with more than 1,800 units that was being planned by Royal Palms Las Vegas, a subsidiary of Royal Palms Communities. The project was to replace the Klondike Hotel and Casino at the south end of the Las Vegas Strip, beside the Las Vegas welcome sign. The resort was approved in October 2006, but an investor pulled out of the project in August 2007, and the land was put up for sale in May 2008.

=== Pinnacle ===
Pinnacle was to include two 36-story towers, near The Orleans hotel-casino. The project was announced in 2005, and was delayed several times before its cancellation in 2008, as a result of financial issues caused by the Great Recession.

=== Red Rock project ===
Announced in July 2005, as a joint venture between Station Casinos and developers Stephen Cloobeck and Steven Molasky. The project was to be built on the same property as the adjacent Red Rock resort, and was known under the names "Red Rock Residences" and "The Residences at Red Rock". The partnership dissolved in 2006, and the project was ultimately cancelled.

=== Rocker Tower ===
In 1995, Thomas Greenough relocated his bar and restaurant, Tommy Rocker's, to Dean Martin Drive, west of Interstate 15 and the Las Vegas Strip. In 2004, Greenough began receiving numerous offers from condominium developers for the one-acre lot that Tommy Rocker's occupied. Greenough, who was unable to work out a deal with potential developers that would incorporate Tommy Rocker's into any planned condominiums, later chose to build his own condominium on the property. In January 2006, Greenough received approval for a 46-story, 252-unit condominium tower, to be constructed on his property at a cost of $150 million. The structure was to be named Rocker Tower.

The tower was expected to be the first in southern Nevada to feature a computerized automated parking structure, with the intention of saving space and decreasing pollution. Greenough had toured Viennese parking garages as part of his research into automated-garage technology. Greenough hoped that the building would be certified by the Leadership in Energy and Environmental Design Green Building Rating System. Construction was expected to begin approximately one year later, with completion expected in summer 2008. Later in 2006, construction was scheduled to begin in fall 2007, with completion scheduled for January 2009. By January 2007, Greenough had shelved his plans to build the condominium due to increasing labor and material costs in the Las Vegas Valley.

=== Sandhurst ===
The Sandhurst was announced in 2004. The project, to be located in downtown Las Vegas, would have included a 35-story tower with 398 units. The tower would have also included commercial space for shops and restaurants. Groundbreaking was initially planned to begin in March 2005, with completion expected by September 2006. However, construction was delayed several times because of rising construction costs. The project was ultimately cancelled in 2007.

=== The Harmon Residences ===
The Harmon hotel, located within CityCenter, initially was to include 207 condominiums. Construction on the building stopped in 2008, after structural defects were discovered. MGM later had the building demolished in 2015.

=== The Summit / Ivana Las Vegas ===
Originally announced as The Summit in August 2004, and renamed as Ivana Las Vegas in 2005, when Ivana Trump became involved in the project. Ivana Las Vegas would have consisted of a $500 million, 73-floor tower with 945 condominium units. The tower was to begin construction in summer 2006, at the north end of the Las Vegas Strip, on 2.17 acres (0.88 ha) of land that was occupied by the closed Holy Cow Casino and Brewery at the time. Ivana Las Vegas had been scheduled for completion in December 2008, but was cancelled in December 2005, due to rising construction costs.

=== Vegas Grand ===
Vegas Grand was announced by developer Del American in 2003, and initially was to consist of 440 apartments and 440 condominiums. The apartment aspect was removed later that year because of rising construction costs, with all 880 units to be used as condominiums. Construction began east of the Las Vegas Strip in March 2006. Vegas Grand was co-financed by Lehman Brothers, which took over the project in 2007, after Del American defaulted on its loan. The project was ultimately completed as an apartment complex known as Las Vegas Grand.

=== Viva ===
In 2005, Station Casinos started purchasing land next to the Wild Wild West Gambling Hall & Hotel it already owned. While no specific plans have been announced, it is widely expected that this move means that a major redevelopment is planned at this location.

According to an article in Forbes, the site has evolved to nearly 1/2-square-mile or 110 acres (45 ha) at a cost of $335 million. With a working title of Viva, the three casino, hotel condo arena project would wind up costing $10 billion.

=== W Las Vegas ===
W Las Vegas was announced as a condo hotel in 2005. The project was expanded in 2006, after the purchase of adjacent land that was to be used for Las Ramblas. W Las Vegas was cancelled in 2007, before beginning construction.

== See also ==
- List of Las Vegas casinos that never opened
- List of Las Vegas Strip hotels
