= Las Vegas Grand =

- Former names: Vegas Grand

General information
- Status: Completed
- Type: Apartments
- Location: 818 East Flamingo Road, Paradise, Nevada, United States
- Coordinates: 36.116546°N 115.144200°W
- Construction started: March 1, 2006
- Opened: c. 2010

Technical details
- Floor count: 4

Other information
- Number of units: 212

Website
- www.lasvegasgrandapts.com

Las Vegas Grand is an apartment complex located east of the Las Vegas Strip in Paradise, Nevada. Situated on approximately 20 acres at Flamingo Road and Swenson Street, the four‑story building provides 212 units with floor plans ranging from 1‑ to 3‑bedroom layouts, sized between approximately 842 and 1,883 sq ft.

- Typical interior features include:
- 12‑ft ceilings (select units)
- Carpeted floors, central air conditioning and heating
- In‑unit washer and dryer, stainless steel kitchen appliances (range, dishwasher, microwave), pantry, and balconies or private terraces in some units
- Master baths sometimes include Roman soaking tubs, dual vanity sinks, and walk-in closets
- Community amenities include:
  - Rooftop pool, clubhouse, basketball court, and tennis court
  - Fitness center (open 24/7), business center, game room, courtesy patrol, gated entry, trash valet
  - Covered parking in a four-level garage; some units offer two-car garages
  - The complex is located in the Paradise neighborhood (ZIP code 89119), roughly within walking distance of the Las Vegas Strip, local shopping, dining, and entertainment venues
- History

The project was built by Chris DelGuidice through his company, Del American, based in Florida. It was built on 20 acres (8.1 ha) located at the intersection of East Flamingo Road and Swenson Street. DelGuidice got the idea for the project around 2001, after reading an article about Las Vegas and the need for more apartment buildings there. DelGuidice chose the property because of its proximity to the Las Vegas Strip, although the site had been overlooked by other developers because of several issues associated with it. The land was located beneath a flight path, and it had washes going through it. DelGuidice initially planned to build apartments on the land, but he held off on the project because of the economic impact of the September 11 attacks. As time went on, construction costs began to rise, although apartment rents remained steady, which convinced DelGuidice to add a condominium component to his project. DelGuidice said, "We did market research and found a strong demand for condos, so we added that to the apartments."

DelGuidice announced the then-unnamed project on August 4, 2003. The project was to include 440 apartment units and an equal number of condominium units. Apartments were to be priced between $850 and $3,000 per month, while condominiums would range from $200,000 to $600,000. DelGuidice purchased the land for $4 million, after working for three years to acquire the property. The land had previously been owned by Nevada Power Company, and was appraised at $11.2 million.

Originally, the project was to be built by Weis Builders of Minneapolis, at a cost of $225 million. Groundbreaking was initially expected to take place in February or March 2004, with the first apartment building scheduled to be completed within 15 months. The project's 12-story condominium building was expected to take approximately 21 months to construct. Within three months of the project's announcement, construction estimates had increased to $325 million. Because of the high costs, DelGuidice cancelled plans for the apartment units, opting instead for all 880 units to be used as condominiums.

On November 9, 2003, Del American announced that the project would be named Vegas Grand, and that it would have an Italian theme. By that point, 102 units had been reserved through a party that DelGuidice held at the Bellagio resort. At the time, construction was scheduled to begin in spring 2004, with the first units available in fall 2005, and full completion in 2007. The project's 880 units would be located in 12- and 6-story towers. DelGuidice called the property an "extremely challenging site," because of an adjacent power station and because of the Flamingo and Tropicana washes located on the land. Vegas Grand was designed by JMA Architecture Studios. The project was designed to avoid having an effect on the washes. DelGuidice said that the land had also been "rezoned from three units per acre to 45 units and engineered it to make it work for us." Sales officially began in December 2003.

== Construction ==
As of May 2004, construction was scheduled to begin later in the fall, with phase one consisting of a 12-story tower. Future phases were to add two six-story buildings and two four-story buildings. Completion was scheduled for 2007. In June 2004, Turner Corporation was announced as general contractor for the project, which was expected to cost $360 million. Construction was expected to begin that summer.

In July 2004, Del American received a $240 million loan for the project, from Lehman Brothers and from Hypo Real Estate Capital Corporation. At that time, more than 800 of the project's units had been reserved, with construction scheduled to begin in September 2004. Construction was delayed by permitting issues. During the delay, Turner resigned itself from the project because of rising construction costs. Summit Builders became the new contractor.

Grading and infrastructure work was underway in early February 2005. Plans at that time included the 12-story Villa d'Este building, the six-story Cipriani and Villaggio buildings, and the four-story Bella Venezia building. By May 2005, Del American was seeking approval from Clark County to add two additional stories to the project, for a new total of 994 units. DelGuidice said the additional units were necessary to keep up with demand and to cover the construction costs. Site preparation concluded that month, with construction possibly beginning in early June 2005.

By December 2005, construction costs on Vegas Grand had increased to $650 million. That month, after extensive drainage and environmental work relating to the washes, a construction permit was issued for the project's 212-unit Bella Venezia I building. Bella Venezia I and II, to be constructed by Summit Builders, would have a total of 425 condominiums in two four-story buildings, totaling 670,000 sq ft (62,000 m^{2}) of residential space. The two buildings would also include two parking structures and retail space. Bella Venezia I was scheduled for completion in early 2007, followed by the scheduled completion of Bella Venezia II later that year. Summit Builders began construction on March 1, 2006, with Bella Venezia I expected for completion in May 2007. In August 2006, Del American announced that the second phase – consisting of the 213-unit Bella Venezia II and a 12-story, 129-unit condominium tower – would soon begin construction.

When Del American defaulted on its loan, Lehman Brothers took control of the project for $55 million through an auction in October 2007. In May 2008, Lehman Brothers hired CB Richard Ellis to market the property. Bella Venezia I was near completion at that time, and was accompanied by 16 acres (6.5 ha) of vacant land that was approved for an additional 782 units. Geoffrey West, First Vice President for CB Richard Ellis, said, "It was originally intended as a for-sale condominium project, but that market has all but disintegrated. This gives an opportunity to utilize it as luxury apartments, a nongaming hotel and resort or a time share. What it does is widen the range of possible uses and makes it more appealing." Approximately $107 million had been spent on the first phase, which included the infrastructure for the 782-unit second phase.

== Lawsuit ==
In April 2005, Del American notified approximately 800 potential buyers with existing reservations that the purchase price for their units would increase as a result of higher costs for concrete, steel, and labor. DelGuidice said that none of the reservations had been converted into contracts and were thus voidable by the buyers. In May 2005, a class action lawsuit was filed against Vegas Grand Condominiums Limited Partnership and Del American because of the price increases. The lawsuit consisted primarily of Nevada residents who purchased units and claimed breach of contract, fraud, deceptive trade practices, and other allegations.

According to the lawsuit, buyers had signed reservation agreements and made deposits ranging from $10,000 to $25,000, possibly dating back to November 2003. The lawsuit alleged that the new prices were nearly doubled from the initial price and that "the defendants had no intention of selling the condominium units to plaintiffs and the class members for the original price." More than 20 additional plaintiffs were added to the lawsuit a week later.

By March 2006, negotiations were underway towards settling the lawsuit. In August 2006, a federal judge gave preliminary approval of a settlement deal. Del American settled the lawsuit in November 2006, and was ordered to pay 2.5 percent of gross sales proceeds into a common fund for 638 people who placed reservations. However, because the project entered foreclosure, DelGuidice never made a profit and the plaintiffs ultimately received no money. In 2016, DelGuidice referred to the project as a "big calamity" and said he would never develop condominiums in Las Vegas again.

== Las Vegas Grand ==
The project was opened around 2010, as a 212-unit apartment complex called Las Vegas Grand. Only one of the originally planned buildings was finished; the other four never began construction. Joseph Daneshgar, a southern California investor, purchased Las Vegas Grand in November 2019, at a cost of $47.6 million. At the time, the complex was 96 percent occupied. Daneshgar also owned the nearby Boca Raton condominiums.
