= Park Towers at Hughes Center =

Park Towers
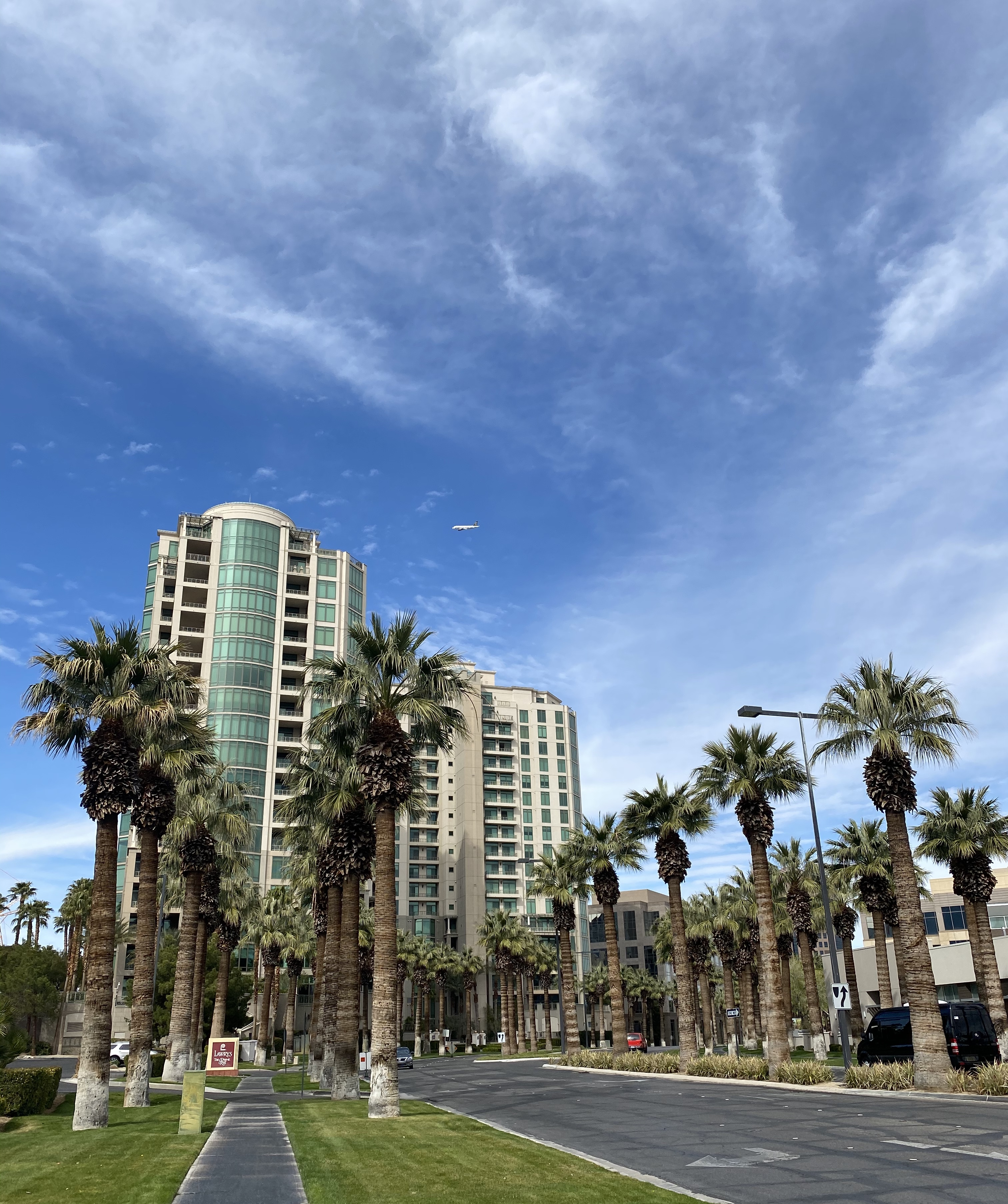
- Park Towers in 2020
- Interactive map of the Park Towers area

General information
- Status: Completed
- Type: Condominiums
- Location: 1 Hughes Center Drive, Paradise, Nevada, United States
- Coordinates: 36.116095°N 115.158865°W
- Construction started: 1999
- Completed: 2001
- Cost: $120 million

Technical details
- Floor count: 20

Design and construction
- Architecture firm: JMA Architecture Studios
- Developer: High Rise JV LLC
- Main contractor: J.A. Jones Construction.

Other information
- Number of units: 84

Website
- Official website

Park Towers is a 20-story twin-tower condominium property located east of the Las Vegas Strip, in Paradise, Nevada. The project was announced in 1998, and began construction the following year. The property was developed by Irwin Molasky, Mark Fine, and Steve Wynn, and was completed in 2001.

== History ==
The project was announced by developer Irwin Molasky in March 1998, as The Park at Hughes Center. Within a year, the project had been renamed as Park Towers. The project was planned as a $100 million, two-tower condominium project with 84 units; between 30 and 40 percent of the units were already sold out as of February 1999. The project was to be developed by Irwin Molasky and Mark Fine, along with Molasky's three sons, Steven, Andrew and Alan Molasky. The project would be built on 3.8 acres (1.5 ha) of land at the Hughes Center business park on Howard Hughes Parkway, near Flamingo Road and Paradise Road, east of the Las Vegas Strip.

Groundbreaking was originally scheduled for fall 1998, but was delayed until April 1999, with construction expected to take 15 months to two years. By July 1999, Steve Wynn had become a developer and designer in the project. Wynn had also purchased a $4 million Park Towers penthouse for himself and his wife, Elaine Wynn. Irwin Molasky stated that Wynn "helped with the design and placement" of the project.

In September 1999, it was announced that French bank Société Générale, as well as the Bank of Nova Scotia, would provide $70 million in construction financing to the project, which was expected to cost $120 million. Construction was scheduled to begin that month, with completion expected in the fourth quarter of 2000. Site preparation was 95-percent complete. In February 2000, construction was scheduled for completion that September. The project's website featured 24-hour camera footage recording the towers' construction. Planned for the property were elevators that would not move before scanning each resident's security card.

The first residents began occupying the property in March 2001. By May 2001, Wynn had sold his Park Towers penthouse to Marc Schorr, an executive for MGM Mirage. Completion of the project was celebrated in July 2001. The project was developed through Irwin Molasky's High Rise JV LLC. Portions of the project were designed by JMA Architecture Studios. $1 million was spent on landscaping. Prices for units at Park Towers ranged from $750,000 to $5 million. Shaquille O'Neal considered purchasing a unit at Park Towers.

In July 2001, J.A. Jones Construction, the general contractor for the project, filed an arbitration claim and an $18.9 million lien on the project, alleging insufficient payment. High Rise JV stated that the work for which the construction company did not receive payment was either incomplete or not up to the developer's standards. John Bond, president of J.A. Jones Construction, denied the claims and said, "We complied with every direction of the developer from the inception to the completion." Bond also said that several design plans for the project were changed late in development, increasing the cost and amount of work. In August 2001, after J.A. Construction cancelled a meeting that was to be held with High Rise JV, the development company filed a lawsuit to reduce the price of the lien to $3.2 million, the amount of money owed to the construction company. The lien was reduced in September 2001.

Park Towers, along with Turnberry Place, inspired a condominium boom in Las Vegas that began in 2003. As of 2011, Irwin Molasky lived in a penthouse suite at Park Towers. In March 2013, Schorr, now the retiring chief operating officer for Wynn Resorts, listed his 9,000 sq ft (840 m^{2}), two-story penthouse for sale at a price of $9.8 million.
