= Kobi Karp =

Architect (born 1962)

- Born: November 1, 1962 (age 64)
- Occupations: Luxury architect & interior designer

Kobi Karp (born November 1, 1962) is a Miami-based architect and founder of Kobi Karp Architecture & Interior Design, which he founded in 1995. Karp has designed houses for NBA star Juwan Howard and for Barry Sternlicht, founder of Starwood Capital Group.

== Career ==
Kobi Karp Architecture & Interior Design has designed projects around the world that have cost $36 billion to develop. Karp has worked on multiple luxury projects in South Florida, including the Astor & Edison Hotels as well as Palazzo Del Sol and Palazzo Della Luna, located on Fisher Island, which has the highest per capita income of any place in the United States. Other projects include the Four Seasons Private Residences in Fort Lauderdale, a building that includes 150 private residences and a 12,000 square foot home in Miami Beach.

Karp designed Monad Terrace, a 59-unit Miami Beach condominium that was designed to withstand a category 5 hurricane and a waterfront $38 million home on Biscayne Bay in Miami Beach. Karp also designed The Surf Club, originally built in 1930 and revamped in 2017. Other projects include a high rise in Fort Lauderdale and three 16-story towers in Tampa, Florida, which are planned for completion in 2027.

== Personal life and education ==
Karp was born on November 1, 1962. Originally from Israel, he relocated to Minneapolis when he was young. He majored in architecture and environmental design at the University of Minnesota Institute of Technology. Karp lives in Miami with his wife and two sons.
