= Ellis Island Casino & Brewery =

Casino in Nevada, United States

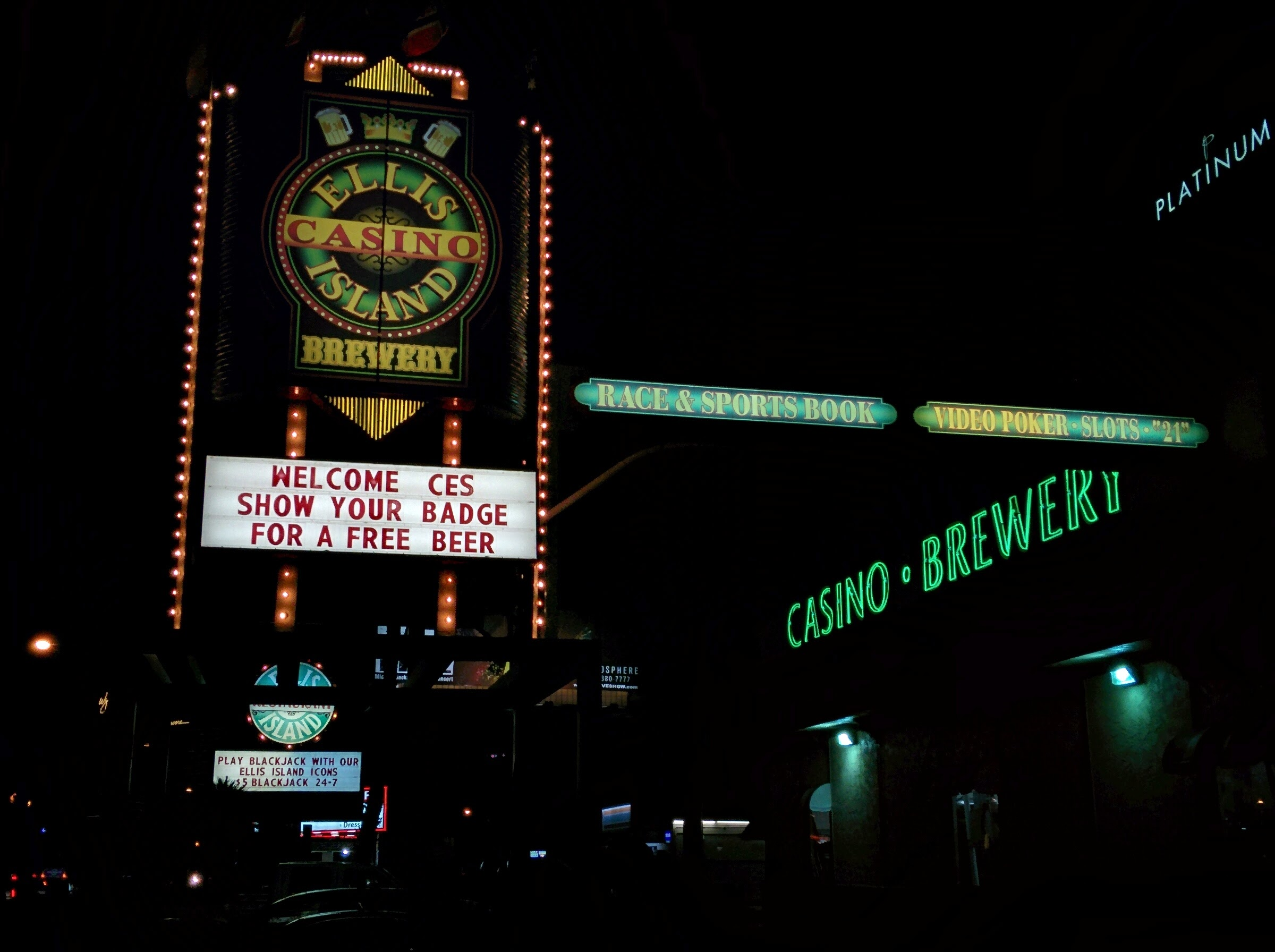
- Ellis Island exterior in 2016
- Interactive map of Ellis Island Casino & Brewery
- Location: Paradise, Nevada; 4178 Koval Lane; 36.1127°N 115.1632°W
- Opened: 1968; 58 years ago
- No. of rooms: 301
- Gaming space: 10,506 sq ft (976.0 m^{2})
- Notable restaurants: Village Pub & Cafe; Ellis Island BBQ; The Front Yard
- Casino type: Land-based
- Owner: Gary Ellis
- Previous names: Village Pub
- Renovated in: 1997, 2019
- Website: ellisislandcasino.com

The Ellis Island Casino & Brewery is located near the Las Vegas Strip in Paradise, Nevada. It was opened by Frank Ellis in 1968, originally as a bar and restaurant called the Village Pub. It was renamed Ellis Island in 1985, and a casino was added four years later. Gary Ellis took over the property in 1990, and it remains a family business in contrast to most Las Vegas casinos.

Ellis Island includes 10,506 sq ft (976.0 m^{2}) of gaming space, as well as several restaurants. It is popular among locals for its cheap food and karaoke bar. In 2014, Ellis Island purchased an adjacent Super 8 hotel, which opened in 1989. The hotel was rebranded under the Ellis Island name, giving the property 301 rooms. A brewery was part of the Ellis Island property from 1998 to 2022, and was demolished for additional casino space.

== History ==
Ellis Island began as a bar and restaurant known as the Village Pub, opened by Frank Ellis in 1968. He operated it as part of his new Village Square shopping center, both located along Koval Lane, one block east of the Las Vegas Strip.

The Village Pub was renamed Ellis Island in 1985. An unaffiliated Super 8 motel opened just south of Ellis Island in early 1989, and eventually became part of the latter. With 300 rooms, it ranked as the largest Super 8 in the world at the time of its opening.

Ellis Island opened a casino on October 1, 1989. Gary Ellis, son of Frank, took over the casino operations a year later. Various family members have since taken on roles at the property, which remains a family business in contrast to most Las Vegas casinos. The Village Pub brand was revived in the 1990s, when the family began opening a chain of restaurant bars around the Las Vegas Valley under the name.

On September 19, 1997, Ellis Island opened a large portion of a $12 million renovation and expansion, which doubled its slot machine count to 410 and introduced table games by adding six blackjack tables. The expansion also added a parking garage and additional dining space.

Ellis Island agreed in 2004 to manage and take joint ownership of the nearby Tuscany Suites and Casino, which had struggled to attract customers in its first year. The agreement fell apart when Tuscany officials allegedly backed out. Later that year, Ellis Island signed on to the planned 46-story Aqua Blue condo-hotel project, which would replace the adjacent Super 8 motel. Ellis Island would manage the Aqua Blue casino, and would itself be renovated to match the new tower. However, the Aqua Blue project was cancelled in 2005, due in part to rising construction costs.

In 2014, Ellis Island bought the three-story Super 8 motel, which was rebranded under the casino's name and features 301 rooms. A $20 million hotel renovation was underway in 2017. That year, work also began on a two-story restaurant and entertainment venue known as the Front Yard, located on the property's northwest corner along Koval Lane. Opened in 2019, it includes a beer garden and capacity for nearly 300 people. Other restaurants include the main Village Pub & Cafe, as well as Ellis Island BBQ and Metro Pizza. The casino has 10,506 sq ft (976.0 m^{2}) of gaming space.

Ellis Island is popular among locals, especially people who work on the Las Vegas Strip. The property is known for its cheap food, its karaoke bar, and its gaming rewards program. It also offers a popular eggnog, which includes alcohol among its ingredients. It is made from a family recipe and has been sold to the public since 2002. The casino produces 5,000 bottles a year as of 2020.

A portion of Koval Lane, including Ellis Island, is featured as part of the track for the Las Vegas Grand Prix, an annual racing event. After the inaugural 2023 race, the property filed a lawsuit alleging monetary damage. The suit claimed that the race, as well as the months-long setup period, impeded access to Ellis Island. In addition to Grand Prix, the property also named Clark County and the state of Nevada as defendants, seeking more than $50,000 in damages. The case was dismissed in September 2024, and Ellis Island subsequently partnered with Grand Prix for future races.

A $35 million expansion of the casino floor began in 2024. The project will include rooftop event space, as well as renovations to the Village Pub restaurant and the karaoke lounge.

== Brewery ==
Ellis Island brewery
- Interactive map of Ellis Island brewery
- Opened: August 1998
- Closed: 2022
- Annual production volume: 3,345 US beer barrels (3,925 hL) (as of 2009)

Inactive beers
Name	Type
Premium Lager	Lager
Premium Light	Low-alcohol Lager
Pale Ale	Lager
Blonde	Lager
Draught	Lager
Lager (Blue)	Lager
Bitter (Red)	Bitter Lager
Stout	Stout
Bright	Lager
First Harvest	Special Ale

In August 1998, Ellis Island established a brewery on the premise and tasked brewmaster Joe Pickett with brewing a variety of beers for the casino's restaurants. Regular brews include Lager, Light Lager, Amber Ale, India Pale Ale, Hefeweizen, Stout and Root Beer, as well as seasonal specials.

With 3345 barrels produced in 2009, Ellis Island was the largest brewpub in the Mountain West region (Arizona, Colorado, Idaho, Montana, Nevada, New Mexico, Utah and Wyoming). In 2018, the brewhouse capacity was doubled and two new brewmasters, Eddie Leal and Michael Key, were hired to run the brewing business.

In December 2018, Ellis Island established Silver Reef Brewing Company in St. George, Utah, adding annual capacity of up to 10,000 barrels to the brewing business. In 2022, the on-site brewery in Las Vegas was dismantled, and the structure was demolished two years later for the casino's expansion. Micro-brew production continues at the Silver Reef facility, which provides supply to Ellis Island.

== See also ==
- Beer in the United States
